= Charlie Chan's Murder Cruise =

1940 film by Eugene Forde

- Directed by: Eugene Forde
- Written by: Earl Derr Biggers (novel); Robert Ellis (adaptation); Helen Logan (adaptation); Robertson White; Lester Ziffren
- Produced by: John Stone
- Starring: Sidney Toler; Victor Sen Yung
- Cinematography: Virgil Miller
- Edited by: Harry Reynolds
- Music by: Samuel Kaylin
- Production company: Twentieth Century-Fox
- Distributed by: Twentieth Century-Fox
- Release date: June 21, 1940
- Running time: 76 minutes
- Country: United States
- Language: English

Charlie Chan's Murder Cruise is a 1940 murder mystery film starring Sidney Toler in his fifth of many performances as Charlie Chan. It is based on the Earl Derr Biggers 1930 novel Charlie Chan Carries On.

== Plot ==
The famed detective seeks to unmask a killer on a voyage across the Pacific Ocean.

It begins harmlessly enough, with Papa Chan catching No.2 and No.7 Sons in his office; trying to destroy a bad report card from school. They are ordered to leave when retired Scotland Yard man Inspector Duff arrives—they leave, but they eavesdrop. Duff is certain there is a mass killer aboard a cruise ship that is now docked in Honolulu. A New York judge was strangled in his stateroom, and he asks Chan to join the cruise and investigate. Chan leaves briefly to get permission from his superiors---and the strangler leans in an open window and kills Duff. While absent, Chan learned there had been ANOTHER murder at the hotel where the cruise passengers are staying. Finding his dead friend, he vows to pursue the case until the end.

Aboard ship, Chan has only a day and a half before the ship docks in San Francisco and the passengers will all scatter to their homes. Jimmy Chan is quickly discovered hiding in a lifeboat---Charlie allows him to be thrown in the brig, sensing Jimmy will be sentenced to work his way through, he is—as a steward with free rein of the staterooms. This was Chan's intent.

Cruise director Dr. Suderman seems overly eager to keep the murders from becoming public knowledge. We have dizzy matron Susie Watson; her patient secretary Paula Drake; and Susie's jovial traveling companion Ross. Professor Gordon bills himself as a traveling archeologist. Mr. and Mrs. Walters are an eerily deadpan couple who spend half their time in the "spirit world" and Gerald Pendleton is a nervous wreck who confines himself to his stateroom (assuming he hasn't been sneaking out).

Charlie finally gets it out of Pendleton that his wife's first husband swore revenge on them for sending him to prison (he was guilty), and the dead Judge had been the one who sentenced him. Buttons, a tough sailor, guards Pendleton's door---but one night he is decoyed away and knocked out---and Pendleton is killed and 30 pieces of Silver left by the body. A muted fun-and-games party has been taking place upstairs, with many candid photos taken. Charlie collects all the negatives, hoping to see who was unaccounted for at the time of the murder. But the killer(disguised in beard and mask) knocks Chan out and takes the negatives. During a below decks chase, the thief is shot and killed. But the negatives aren't on him. It is revealed to be Ross. But Charlie says it isn't over—Ross was a mere accomplice who would don the disguise as a decoy. The actual killer was blackmailing him; Ross was secretly a jewelry fence who had done business with the killer in the past.

Pendleton's wife, the REAL target all along, is brought to the San Francisco docks; apparently crippled and blinded from an auto accident. But her mere presence goads the killer into making a fatal mistake, and justice is done at last. They still must convince Jimmy, who is nervously holding Dr. Suderman at gunpoint.

== Cast ==
- Sidney Toler as Charlie Chan
- Victor Sen Yung as Jimmy Chan (as Sen Yung)
- Robert Lowery as Dick Kenyon
- Marjorie Weaver as Paula Drake
- Lionel Atwill as Dr. Suderman
- Don Beddoe as Fredrick Ross
- Leo G. Carroll as Prof. Gordon (as Leo Carroll)
- Cora Witherspoon as Susie Watson
- Leonard Mudie as Gerald Pendleton
- Harlan Briggs as Coroner
- Charles Middleton as Jeremiah Walters
- Claire Du Brey as Sarah Walters
- Kay Linaker as Linda Pendleton
- James Burke as Wilkie
- Richard Keene as Buttons
- Layne Tom Jr. as Willie Chan
- C. Montague Shaw as Inspector Duff
- Shemp Howard as Shorty Mc Coy(uncredited)
- Paul Mc Vey as Mrs.Pendleton's Doctor (uncredited)

== Production ==
Charlie Chan's Murder Cruise is the second film adaptation of Earl Derr Biggers' novel Charlie Chan Carries On. The first version, with Chan played by Warner Oland, is now lost. Charlie Chan's role was expanded for Charlie Chan's Murder Cruise.

== Critical response ==
Writing in The New York Times, film critic Bosley Crowther reported that "Charlie assembles the clues with his usual imperturbable finesse, and then springs his inevitable trap," and that the film "is just another trip around the old circuit, brightened up a little bit by the presence of Cora Witherspoon, Don Beddoe and Leo Carroll." Film critic Stuart Galbraith IV wrote in DVD Talk that the film is "one of the most enjoyable [of the] Toler entries," that it has "a great line-up of character stars," and that "Toler, initially inexpressive and completely lacking Warner Oland's enormous charm, has warmed up to the part a bit, letting neat little bits of humor, etc., slip through his mask-like portrayal."
