= The Amazing Chan and the Chan Clan =

American animated television series

- Title card
- Genre: Mystery
- Based on: Charlie Chan by Earl Derr Biggers
- Written by: Dennis Marks
- Directed by: William Hanna; Joseph Barbera
- Voices of: See § Voice cast
- Country of origin: United States
- No. of seasons: 1
- No. of episodes: 16

Production
- Producers: William Hanna; Joseph Barbera
- Running time: 30 minutes
- Production company: Hanna-Barbera Productions

Original release
- Network: CBS
- Release: September 9 – December 30, 1972

The Amazing Chan and the Chan Clan (sometimes abbreviated as The Amazing Chan Clan) is an American animated television series produced by Hanna-Barbera Productions, animated by Eric Porter Studios in Australia and broadcast on CBS from September 9, 1972, to December 30, 1972, with reruns continuing through the summer of 1973 and in syndication from 1976 to 1982. The show was loosely based on the Charlie Chan series of mystery novels and films, which began with the 1925 novel The House Without a Key.

== Plot summary ==
Throughout the series, legendary Chinese sleuth Charlie Chan is both impeded and assisted by his family of ten children and their dog Chu Chu, in the process of solving mysteries and catching wily master criminals.

The family travels around the world in the Chan Van, a vehicle built by teenage genius Alan Chan, which can transform itself with the push of a button. While solving mysteries, the Chan kids break off into small groups with Henry and Stanley, the two oldest children, being paired together and driving the Chan Van. To ostensibly aid in their detective work, Stanley usually changes into some sort of goofy disguise much to the chagrin of his older brother Henry. As in many other Hanna-Barbera cartoons of the period, the kids also have their own music group, the Chan Clan, and they perform a song in each episode. Like most cartoons aired in the 1970’s and made by Hanna Barbera, The Amazing Chan and the Chan Clan had a laugh track. However, Boomerang and Cartoon Network removed the laugh track.

== Voice cast ==
As the voice of the title character, Keye Luke is (to date) the only actor of Chinese ancestry to play the part in any screen adaptation. Luke had previously portrayed "Number One Son" Lee Chan opposite Warner Oland whose characterization had a relatively limited vocabulary in the long-running Charlie Chan film series of the 1930s and 1940s by 20th Century Fox and later, Monogram Pictures.

Early on, it was decided that most of the children's accents were too thick for American audiences to understand, and all of the characters except Henry and Alan were recast. Once the new cast was in place, earlier episodes were re-dubbed.

Voice Cast of The Amazing Chan and the Chan Clan
Actor		Role
Original	Re-dubbed	Role
Keye Luke		Mr. Charlie Chan
Famous investigator who always spots the clues that his ten children always miss and always ends up solving the case.
Robert Ito		Henry Chan
Eldest son and first born of the Chan siblings. Always teams with Stanley to chase after suspects. Plays drums for the Chan Clan band.
Stephen Wong	Lennie Weinrib	Stanley Chan
Second born of the Chan siblings. Likes to disguise himself in weird costumes to fool suspects and constantly annoys Henry. Plays guitar for the Chan Clan band.
Virginia Ann Lee	Cherylene Lee	Suzie Chan
Third born and eldest daughter of the Chan siblings. The prettiest of the Chan girls who usually teams with Alan, Anne, and Tom to chase after suspects. Plays the tambourine for the Chan Clan band.
Brian Tochi		Alan Chan
Fourth child and twin brother of Anne. A skilled inventor who made the Chan Van and its transformations. Plays clarinet for the Chan Clan band.
Leslie Kumamota	Jodie Foster	Anne Chan
Fifth child and twin sister of Alan. A tomboy who prefers athletics.
Michael Takamoto	John Gunn	Tom Chan
Sixth born child and most intellectual of the Chan siblings. Plays trombone for the Chan Clan band.
Jay Jay Jue	Gene Andrusco	Flip Chan
Seventh born child who leads the four youngest children to chase after suspects. Tends to jump to conclusions.
Debbie Jue	Beverly Kushida	Nancy Chan
Eighth born child. The clumsiest of the siblings who is usually seen eating something.
Leslie Juwai	Cherylene Lee	Mimi Chan
Ninth born child. Likes to boss around her younger brother.
Robin Toma	Michael Morgan	Scooter Chan
Youngest of the Chan siblings. Resents being bossed around by Mimi.
Don Messick		Chu Chu the Dog
The family's pet Pekingese who can imitate different sounds.

== Episodes ==
No.	Title	Original release date
1	"The Crown Jewels Caper"	September 9, 1972
The Crown Jewels have disappeared from their case. Villain: The Curator
2	"To Catch a Pitcher"	September 16, 1972
A famous pitcher is missing and feared kidnapped. Villains: Mr. Flynn, the secretary and two thugs
3	"Will the Real Charlie Chan Please Stand Up?"	September 30, 1972
The Chan Clan must find the impostor who is framing Mr. Chan for the hotel robberies.
4	"The Phantom Sea Thief"	September 30, 1972
A mysterious thief steals a painting during the Chan Clan's performance aboard a cruise ship.
5	"Eye of the Idol"	October 7, 1972
A thief uses a smoke bomb to distract the Chan Clan and everyone in the room while he steals a jeweled idol's eye.
6	"Fat Lady Caper"	October 14, 1972
Dimples the fat lady seems to disappear when a bank robber is on the loose.
7	"Captain Kidd's Doubloons"	October 21, 1972
The Chan Clan must solve the theft of the doubloons.
8	"Bronze Idol"	October 28, 1972
A con artist uses an idol statue to trick the villagers into giving it more pearls.
9	"Double Trouble"	November 4, 1972
Prince Hareem, who plans to be in an auto race, is kidnapped and replaced with an impostor.
10	"The Great Illusion Caper"	November 11, 1972
A magician's dog has been stolen, and the Chans must help find her.
11	"The Mummy's Tomb"	November 18, 1972
A golden coffin of a famous pharaoh is stolen.
12	"The Mardi Gras Caper"	November 25, 1972
A valuable ring is stolen while the Chan Clan is in New Orleans for Mardi Gras.
13	"The Gypsy Caper"	December 2, 1972
A mural has been stolen. While on the case, Stanley accidentally makes Henry swallow a clock.
14	"The Greek Caper"	December 9, 1972
A statue of the winged goddess Athena is stolen and replaced by a plaster copy. Mr. Chan enlists Alan's help to find it.
15	"White Elephant"	December 16, 1972
The Maharaja's white elephant Sing Ha disappears from the elephant enclosure when they are feeding it, and is feared stolen.
16	"Scotland Yard"	December 30, 1972
A priceless stone called the Stone of Scone is stolen and the Chan Clan must help get it back.

== Reception ==
The program was sharply criticized by Katheryn Fong, Community Coordinator of the Chinese Media Committee of Chinese for Affirmative Action, an advocacy group based in San Francisco, for continuing "to isolate generations of Chinese-Americans as being 'different'" and keeping the same "detective intoning stilted, fortune-cookie English spoken in proverbs". CBS President Robert D. Wood responded by calling the show "a lighthearted escapist program for youngsters", emphasizing the stereotypical Asian-American tropes of filial piety and intelligence as positive contributions with the hope "that CBS' Chan might begin to replace some of the abrasive imagery created by the old Charlie Chan character". Fong called this attitude a "great tragedy ... convincing many people that this kowtowing caricature is acceptable" and drew an analogy with a hypothetical cartoon about Adolf Hitler: "If CBS did a cartoon called 'Hitler's Haus' along the same lines of 'respect' and German pragmatism as your interpretation of Chan's wisdom, would that begin to replace some of the abrasive imagery created by the old Hitler and make him more acceptable to Jews?" Fong went on to sue the Federal Communications Commission in January 1973.

== Production ==
=== Music ===
Don Kirshner produced the songs for the show as he did for The Monkees and The Archie Show. Singer Ron Dante supplies the singing voice of Stanley as he did for Archie on The Archie Show.

== Marketing and other media ==
A board game, jigsaw puzzle, lunch box with thermos, and comic book series were released as licensed merchandise alongside the animated series.

=== Comic book ===
The Amazing Chan and the Chan Clan (comic book series)
Issue	Date	Story	Pages
#1	May 1973	The Hot Ice Cream Man	26
#2	Aug 1973	To Catch a Pitcher	26
#3	Nov 1973	The Sticky-Fingered Mr. Chan	14
#3	Nov 1973	The Disappearing Pharaoh	11
#4	Feb 1974	The Eye of the Idol	14
#4	Feb 1974	The Phantom of Ophir	12

At about the same time that the show came out, Gold Key Comics produced a comic book series based on the program, with artwork by Warren Tufts; it only lasted four issues. The first issue (an adaptation of the first episode) was written by Mark Evanier and was his first comic book printed in English.

=== Home media ===
On June 19, 2012, Warner Archive released The Amazing Chan and the Chan Clan: The Complete Series on DVD in region 1 as part of their Hanna–Barbera Classics Collection. This is a manufacture-on-demand (MOD) release, available through Warner's online store and Amazon.com.

=== Other media appearances ===
- The Chans appear in an episode of Harvey Birdman, Attorney at Law, as a Japanese band called "Shoyu Weenie", with Mr. Chan as their semi-tyrannical band manager, who sued another band ("The Neptunes" from the Jabberjaw animated series) for plagiarism. Shoyu Weenie only spoke Japanese, although the original characters are Chinese.
- In episodes from Krypto the Superdog including "Up, Up, and Away!", Mimi Chan is in Kevin's class on the field trip to LexCorp.
- A high school student resembling Suzie Chan appears in three season 1 episodes of Scooby-Doo! Mystery Incorporated.

== See also ==
- List of works produced by Hanna-Barbera Productions
