= Charlie Chan Carries On =

1930 novel by Earl Derr Biggers

- First edition
- Author: Earl Derr Biggers
- Language: English
- Series: Charlie Chan
- Genre: Mystery, Novels
- Publisher: Bobbs-Merrill
- Publication date: 1930
- Publication place: United States
- Media type: Print (Hardback & Paperback)
- ISBN: 0-85468-122-1 (1972 hardback edition)
- Preceded by: The Black Camel
- Followed by: Keeper of the Keys

Charlie Chan Carries On (1930) is the fifth novel in the Charlie Chan series by Earl Derr Biggers.

== Plot summary ==
Inspector Duff, a Scotland Yard detective and friend of Chan's, first introduced in Behind That Curtain, is pursuing a murderer on an around-the-world voyage; so far, there have been murders in London, France, Italy and Japan. While his ship is docked in Honolulu, the detective is shot and wounded by his quarry; though he survives, he is unable to continue with the cruise, and Chan takes his place instead. Eventually, Chan finds the killer before the next port of call.

== Film adaptations ==
A film entitled Charlie Chan Carries On, starring Warner Oland, was produced in 1931. The film is now considered to be a lost film, with only a trailer known to survive.

However, Fox filmed a Spanish-language version starring Manuel Arbó, using many of the same sets, using a Spanish-speaking cast, which was released under the title Eran Trece (There Were Thirteen). This used many of the same pieces of stock footage as the English-language version and the script was expanded somewhat based on the English-language script. This Spanish-language version is currently available as a bonus feature on the DVD release of Charlie Chan in Shanghai.

The film Charlie Chan's Murder Cruise (1940), starring Sidney Toler, Oland's successor in the role, was also based on the novel.

== See also ==
- List of lost films
