= Chang Apana =

Chinese-Hawaiian police officer (1871–1933)

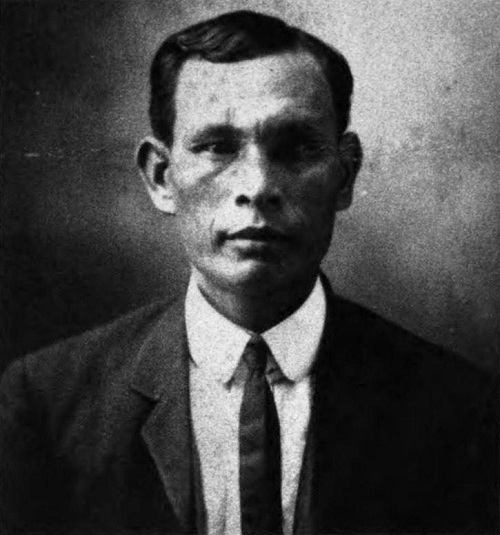
- Born: December 26, 1871; Waipiʻo, Oahu, Hawaiian Kingdom
- Died: December 8, 1933 (aged 61); Honolulu, Oahu, Territory of Hawaii
- Police career
- Department: Honolulu Police Department
- Service years: 34
- Rank: Detective

Chinese name
- Traditional Chinese: 鄭阿平
- Simplified Chinese: 郑阿平
Transcriptions
Standard Mandarin
- Hanyu Pinyin: Zhèng Āpíng
- Wade–Giles: Cheng^{4} A^{1}p'ing^{2}
Yue: Cantonese
- Jyutping: Zeng^{6} Aa^{3}ping^{4}

Chang Apana (Note: In this Chinese name, the family name is Chang.) (December 26, 1871 – December 8, 1933; traditional Chinese: 鄭阿平; simplified Chinese: 郑阿平; pinyin: Zhèng Āpíng) was a Chinese-Hawaiian detective of the Honolulu Police Department. He was acknowledged by Earl Derr Biggers as the inspiration for his fictional Chinese-American detective character, Charlie Chan.

== Early life ==
Chang Ah Ping (鄭阿平) was born December 26, 1871, in Waipiʻo, Oahu, Hawaii. Apana is a Hawaiianized version of the Chinese name Ah Ping. His family moved back to China when he was three, but Chang returned at the age of ten to live with his uncle in Waipiʻo. As an adult, Chang was fluent in Hawaiian, Hawaiian Pidgin and Cantonese. He never learned to read, relying on his family to read newspapers and documents for him. In his youth, he worked as a paniolo (Hawaiian cowboy), starting in 1891, and it was as part of this job that he first began carrying a bullwhip on a regular basis. Three years later, Chang started working for the Hawaii Humane Society, which at the time was part of the police department on the island. The Humane Society was founded by Helen Kinau Wilder, the owner of the horses that Chang had handled as a paniolo. Wilder was the daughter of shipping magnate Samuel Gardner Wilder.

== Police career ==
In 1898, Chang joined the Honolulu Police Department, where he was assigned to patrol Chinatown. In his early years as a detective, beginning in 1916, Chang worked primarily on opium-smuggling and illegal gambling cases.

Due in part to his fluency in several languages, his wide network of informants and his shrewd and meticulous detective style, Chang was successful in solving many cases. Many stories about Chang's career have arisen. Chang helped round up people infected with leprosy and send them to a leper colony on the island of Molokaʻi. While performing this duty, Chang was attacked by a Japanese leper with a sickle, leaving him with a scar over his right eye. Another time Chang was thrown out of a second story window by drug addicts, only to land on his feet. There is an account that he raised the alarm on a shipment of contraband after being run over by a horse and buggy. One night in Honolulu, with no backup and armed only with his bullwhip, Chang arrested 40 gamblers, whom he then lined up and marched back to the police station.

== Inspiration for Charlie Chan ==
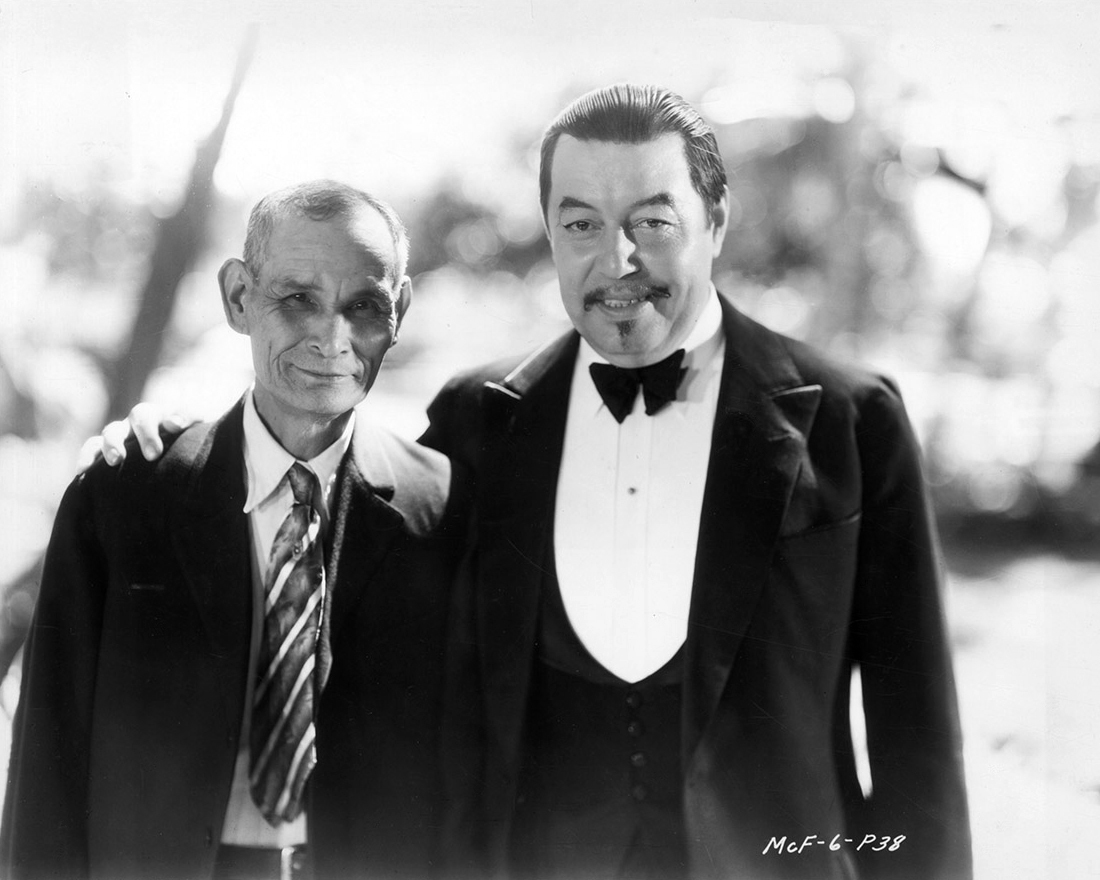
Apana with Warner Oland on the set of The Black Camel in Honolulu (May 1931)

Earl Derr Biggers vacationed in Hawaii in 1920 where he was inspired to begin to write the novel The House Without a Key. While reading Honolulu newspapers in the New York library in 1924, he read about the exploits of Apana Chang. Biggers then created a new character based on Chang for his novel, inserting him a quarter of the way through the book. The character became popular and Biggers expanded his presence in his novels. Chang met actor Warner Oland, who portrayed Charlie Chan, when The Black Camel was filmed in Hawaii. When Biggers met Chang in 1928 the real detective was already being called "Charlie Chan", and Chang enjoyed watching his fictional counterpart's films. After five more novels, Biggers publicly acknowledged Chang as the inspiration for his character in a letter to The Honolulu Advertiser dated June 28, 1932. His widow states, though, that Chan was actually based on Biggers himself, resembling him in physique and character, whereas Chang was slight in build, quick to anger, and involved in very few actual murder cases.

== Retirement and death ==
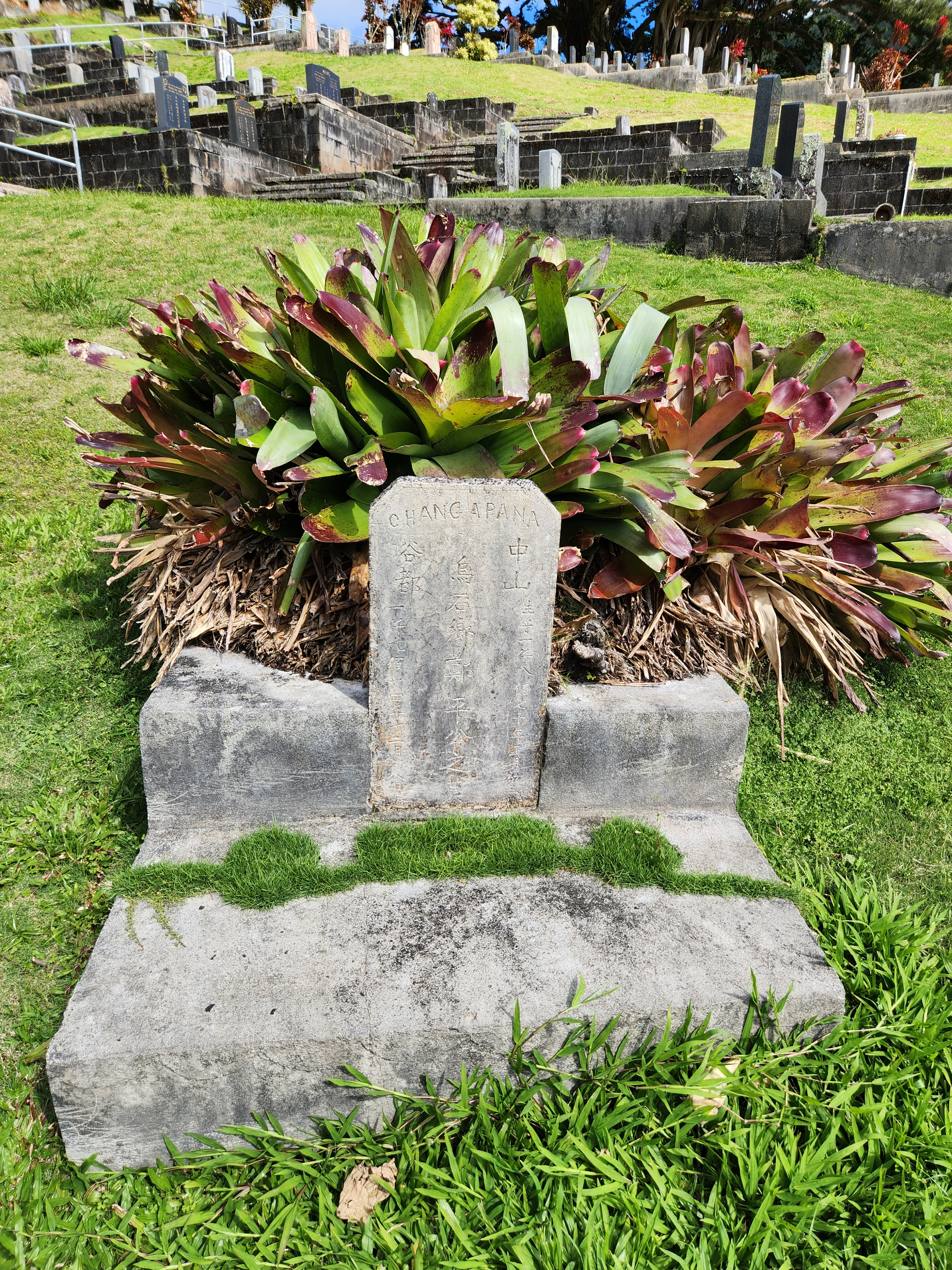
Chang Apana's grave at Manoa Chinese Cemetery in Honolulu, Hawaii

After 34 years of service, Chang retired in May 1932 as a detective when he was injured in a car accident. He briefly worked as a watchman at the Hawaiian Trust building. On December 2, 1933, Chang was admitted to Queen's Hospital after a serious month-long illness. On December 7, 1933, his gangrenous leg was amputated and he died the following day. Chang is buried at the Manoa Chinese Cemetery in Honolulu.

== Influence ==
Chang's law enforcement career was an influence on other fictional works other than Charlie Chan. Max Allan Collins's 1996 novel, Damned in Paradise, fictionalizes the famous Massie case. Collins included fictionalized depictions of several historical figures, including Chang Apana, who was an active-duty detective at the time of the Massie case (though there is no official record of Chang being one of the investigating officers).

Usagi Yojimbo, a comic book series by Stan Sakai that is set in 17th-century Japan and features a cast of anthropomorphic characters, includes occasional appearances of a character named Inspector Ishida who is partially based on Chang Apana. As Max Allan Collins points out in the introduction to Usagi Yojimbo Book 13: Grey Shadows, Inspector Ishida is, like the real Chang Apana, a more hardboiled character than the mild-mannered Charlie Chan.

In a 2011 comic story written by Mike Curtis and illustrated by Joe Staton for the Dick Tracy newspaper strip, Tracy's friend and colleague, HPD officer Haku Kou, is depicted as being the technical advisor on a movie being filmed in Tracy's city because of the title character's facility with a blacksnake whip. Kou explains that he became proficient with that weapon (leading to his being hired as the film's technical advisor) in emulation of Chang Apana.

Chang was featured in the seventh episode of the ninth season of the remake of Hawaii Five-O, entitled "Pua A'e La Ka Uwahi O Ka Moe" ("The Smoke Seen in the Dream Now Rises"), which highlighted some of Chang's stories and his successes in solving cases.
