= Charlie Chan =

Fictional detective

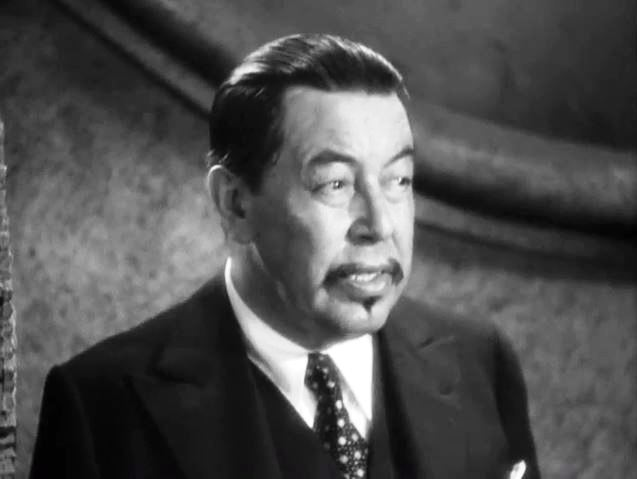
- Warner Oland as Charlie Chan in Charlie Chan's Secret (1936)
- First appearance: The House Without a Key (1925)
- Last appearance: Keeper of the Keys (1932)
- Created by: Earl Derr Biggers
- Portrayed by: George Kuwa; Kamiyama Sojin; E. L. Park; Warner Oland; Manuel Arbó; Sidney Toler; Roland Winters; Ross Martin; Peter Ustinov
- Voiced by: Keye Luke

In-universe information
- Gender: Male
- Occupation: Detective
- Children: 14
- Nationality: American-Chinese

Charlie Chan is a fictional police detective created by author Earl Derr Biggers for the titular series of mystery novels. Biggers loosely based Chan on Hawaiian detective Chang Apana. The benevolent and heroic Chan was conceived as an alternative to Yellow Peril stereotypes and villains like Fu Manchu, though nevertheless is an example of "yellowface". While Chan is based in Honolulu, he frequently travels the world beyond Hawaii as he investigates mysteries and solves crimes.

Chan first appeared in Biggers' novels and then was featured in a number of media. Over four dozen films featuring Charlie Chan were made, beginning in 1926. The character, featured only as a supporting character, was first portrayed by East Asian actors, and the films met with little success. In 1931, for the first film centering on Chan, Charlie Chan Carries On, the Fox Film Corporation cast Swedish actor Warner Oland; the film became popular, and Fox went on to produce 15 more Chan films with Oland in the title role. After Oland's death, American actor Sidney Toler was cast as Chan; Toler made 22 Chan films, first for Fox and then for Monogram Pictures. After Toler's death, Monogram made six more Chan features starring Roland Winters.

Readers and moviegoers of America greeted Chan warmly. Chan was seen as an attractive character, portrayed as intelligent, heroic, benevolent, and honorable; this contrasted with the common depiction of Asians as evil or conniving which dominated Hollywood and national media in the early 20th century. However, in later decades, critics increasingly took a more ambivalent view of the character. Despite his good qualities, Chan was also perceived as reinforcing condescending Asian stereotypes, such as an apparent incapacity to speak idiomatic English and a tradition-bound and subservient nature. No Charlie Chan film has been produced since 1981, but in 2026 a Canadian production company, Margin Films, announced plans to produce a new Charlie Chan television series that depicts a modern version of the character.

The character has also been featured in several radio programs, two television shows, and comics.

== Books ==
The character of Charlie Chan was created by Earl Derr Biggers. In 1919, while visiting Hawaii, Biggers planned a detective novel to be called The House Without a Key. He did not begin to write that novel until four years later, however, when he was inspired to add a Chinese-American police officer to the plot after reading in a newspaper of Chang Apana and Lee Fook, two detectives on the Honolulu police force. Biggers, who disliked the Yellow Peril stereotypes he found when he came to California, explicitly conceived of the character as an alternative: "Sinister and wicked Chinese are old stuff, but an amiable Chinese on the side of law and order has never been used.":

It overwhelms me with sadness to admit it … for he is of my own origin, my own race, as you know. But when I look into his eyes I discover that a gulf like the heaving Pacific lies between us. Why? Because he, though among Caucasians many more years than I, still remains Chinese. As Chinese to-day as in the first moon of his existence. While I – I bear the brand – the label – Americanized.... I traveled with the current.... I was ambitious. I sought success. For what I have won, I paid the price. Am I an American? No. Am I, then, a Chinese? Not in the eyes of Ah Sing.

— Charlie Chan, speaking of a murderer's accomplice, in Keeper of the Keys, by Earl Derr Biggers

The "amiable Chinese" made his first appearance in The House Without a Key (1925). The character was not central to the novel and was not mentioned by name on the dust jacket of the first edition. In the novel, Chan is described as "very fat indeed, yet he walked with the light dainty step of a woman" and in The Chinese Parrot as being " … an undistinguished figure in his Western clothes." According to critic Sandra Hawley, this description of Chan allows Biggers to portray the character as nonthreatening, the opposite of evil Chinese characters, such as Fu Manchu, while simultaneously emphasizing supposedly Chinese characteristics such as impassivity and stoicism.

Biggers wrote six novels in which Charlie Chan appears:

- The House Without a Key (1925)
- The Chinese Parrot (1926)
- Behind That Curtain (1928)
- The Black Camel (1929)
- Charlie Chan Carries On (1930)
- Keeper of the Keys (1932)

== Adaptations ==
=== Films ===
The first film featuring Charlie Chan, as a supporting character, was The House Without a Key (1926), a ten-chapter serial produced by Pathé Studios, starring George Kuwa, a Japanese actor, as Chan. A year later Universal Pictures followed with The Chinese Parrot, starring Japanese actor Kamiyama Sojin as Chan, again as a supporting character. In both productions, Charlie Chan's role was minimized. Contemporary reviews were unfavorable; in the words of one reviewer, speaking of The Chinese Parrot, Sojin plays "the Chink sleuth as a Lon Chaney cook-waiter … because Chaney can't stoop that low."

For the first film to center mainly on the character of Chan, Warner Oland, a white actor, was cast in the title role in 1931's Charlie Chan Carries On, and it was this film that gained popular success. Oland, a Swedish actor who claimed some Mongolian ancestry, had also played Fu Manchu in an earlier film. Oland played the character as more gentle and self-effacing than he had been in the books, perhaps in "a deliberate attempt by the studio to downplay an uppity attitude in a Chinese detective." Oland starred in sixteen Chan films for Fox, often with Keye Luke, who played Chan's "Number One Son", Lee Chan. Oland's "warmth and gentle humor" helped make the character and films popular; the Oland Chan films were among Fox's most successful. By attracting "major audiences and box-office grosses on a par with A's" they "kept Fox afloat" during the Great Depression.

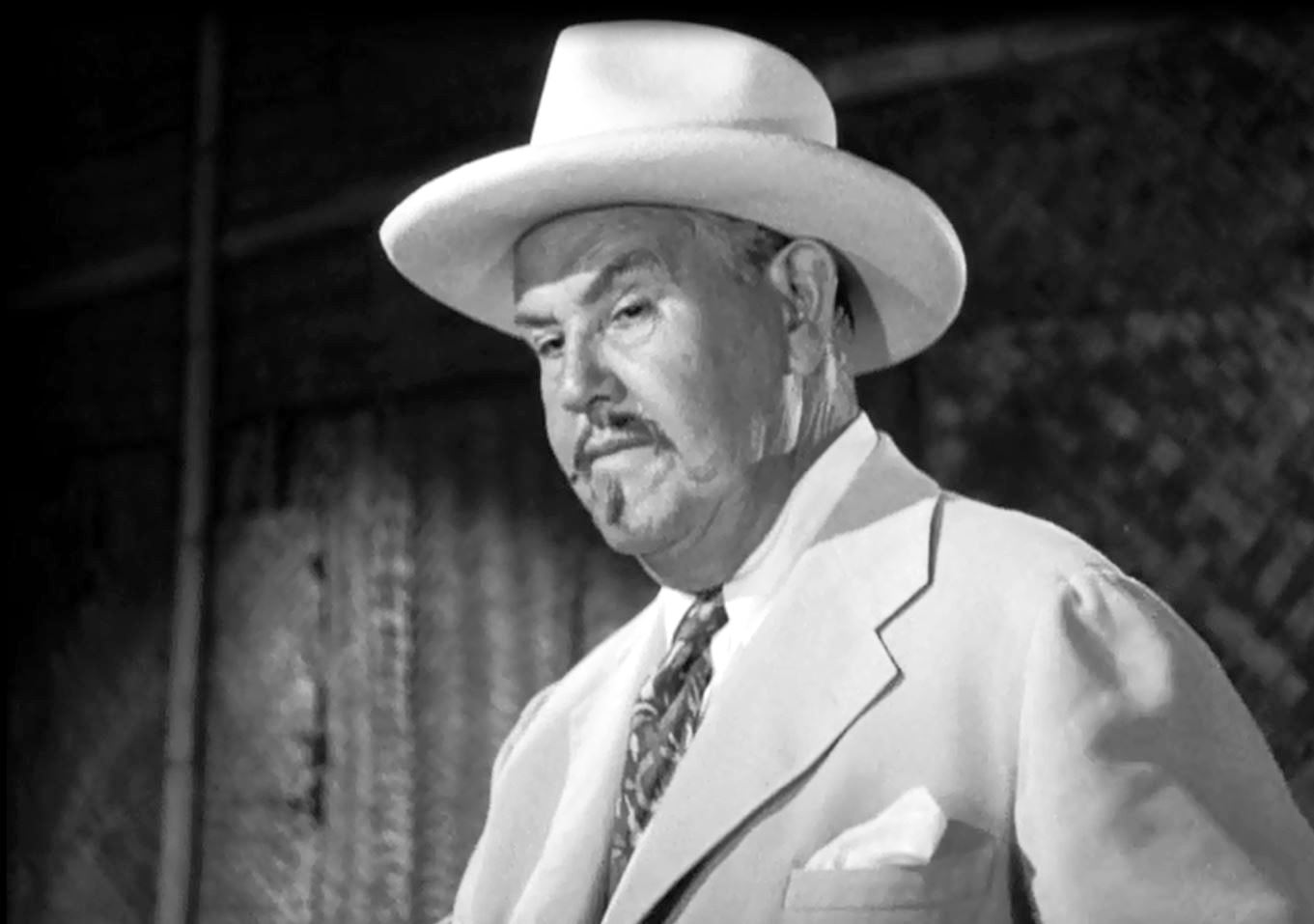
Sidney Toler as Charlie Chan in Dangerous Money (1946)

Oland died in 1938. "When he died I wanted to leave the series," said Keye Luke. "He died midway through a film, and we simply brought in Mr. Moto instead to complete it on deadline." The partially completed Charlie Chan at the Ringside was rewritten with additional footage as Mr. Moto's Gamble, featuring another East Asian protagonist. Luke appeared as Lee Chan, not only in sequences already shot but also in new scenes with Moto actor Peter Lorre.

Fox decided to continue the Charlie Chan series, and selected another white actor, Sidney Toler, to play the lead. Fox produced 11 more Chan films through 1942. Toler's Chan was less mild-mannered than Oland's, a "switch in attitude that added some of the vigor of the original books to the films." He is frequently accompanied, and irritated, by his Number Two Son Jimmy Chan, played by Victor Sen Yung, who later portrayed "Hop Sing" in the long-running Western television series Bonanza.

In 1942, when Fox decided to produce no further Chan films, Sidney Toler purchased the film rights from the author's widow. He had hoped to film more Charlie Chan pictures independently, to be released through Fox, but Fox had already discontinued the series and had no interest in reviving it. Toler approached Philip N. Krasne, a Hollywood lawyer who financed film productions, and Krasne brokered a deal with Monogram Pictures. Krasne and James S. Burkett co-produced three of the films for Monogram, and then Burkett produced the rest of the Monogram Chans on his own. The budget for each film was reduced from Fox's average of $200,000 to $75,000.

For the first time, Chan was portrayed on occasion as "openly contemptuous of suspects and superiors." Victor Sen Yung was slated to continue in the role of Number Two Son, but his acting career was interrupted by military service. He was replaced by Number Three Son Benson Fong (and once by Number Four Son Edwin Luke, Keye Luke's brother). African American comedian Mantan Moreland played Chan's cheerful but easily rattled chauffeur Birmingham Brown in 13 films (1944–1949). Moreland had been a valuable drawing card at Monogram since 1940, and his amusing antics were always well received by trade reviewers when the films played in theaters. Today's audiences, however, find Moreland a matter of taste: some call his performances "brilliant comic turns", while others describe Moreland's role as an offensive and embarrassing stereotype. In The Scarlet Clue and Dark Alibi Moreland was teamed with actor-comedian Ben Carter; Moreland and Carter were so popular that they embarked on a coast-to-coast personal-appearance tour for eight weeks, which is why Moreland was missing from The Red Dragon and Dangerous Money. Veteran African-American comic Willie Best substituted for him.

In 1946, Sidney Toler, terminally ill, valiantly continued as Charlie Chan, and Victor Sen Yung returned to the series, replacing Benson Fong. After Toler died in February 1947, he was succeeded by character actor Roland Winters for six films. Keye Luke, missing from the series after 1938's Mr. Moto reworking, returned as Charlie's son in the last two entries. Monogram had planned to continue the series into the 1950s, with Roland Winters and Keye Luke set to begin filming at Monogram's British studio. "I was all packed and ready to go when I got a studio call telling me it was off," Luke recalled. "[Monogram] planned on using up the currency reserves they had stored over there, and all of a sudden [British Prime Minister Clement] Attlee went and devalued the pound!" The Charlie Chan movie series thus came to an end.

==== Spanish-language adaptations ====
Three Spanish-language Charlie Chan films were made in the 1930s and 1950s. The first, Eran Trece (There Were Thirteen, 1931), is a multiple-language version of Charlie Chan Carries On (1931). The two films were made concurrently and followed the same production schedule, with each scene filmed twice the same day, once in English and then in Spanish. The film followed essentially the same script as the Anglophone version, with minor additions such as brief songs and skits and some changes to characters' names (for example, the character Elmer Benbow was renamed Frank Benbow). A Cuban production, La Serpiente Roja (The Red Snake), followed in 1937. In 1955, Producciones Cub-Mex produced a Mexican version of Charlie Chan called El Monstruo en la Sombra (Monster in the Shadow), starring Orlando Rodriguez as "Chan Li Po" (Charlie Chan in the original script). The film was inspired by La Serpiente Roja as well as the American Warner Oland films.

==== Chinese-language adaptations ====
During the 1930s and 1940s, five Chan films were produced in Shanghai and Hong Kong. In these films, Chan, played by Xu Xinyuan (徐莘园), owns his detective agency and is aided not by a son but by a daughter, Manna, played first by Gu Meijun (顾梅君) in the Shanghai productions and then by Bai Yan (白燕) in postwar Hong Kong.

Chinese audiences also saw the original American Charlie Chan films. They were by far the most popular American films in 1930s China and among Chinese expatriates; "one of the reasons for this acceptance was that this was the first time Chinese audiences saw a positive Chinese character in an American film, a departure from the sinister East Asian stereotypes in earlier movies like Thief of Baghdad (1924) and Harold Lloyd's Welcome Danger (1929), which incited riots that shut down the Shanghai theater showing it." Oland's visit to China was reported extensively in Chinese newspapers, and the actor was respectfully called "Mr. Chan".

==== Modern adaptations ====
In 1980, Jerry Sherlock began production on a comedy film to be called Charlie Chan and the Dragon Lady. A group calling itself C.A.N. (Coalition of Asians to Nix) was formed, protesting the fact that non-Chinese actors, Peter Ustinov and Angie Dickinson, had been cast in the primary roles. Others protested that the film script contained a number of stereotypes; Sherlock responded that the film was not a documentary. The film was released the following year as Charlie Chan and the Curse of the Dragon Queen and was an "abysmal failure". An updated film version of the character was planned in the 1990s by Miramax. While this Charlie Chan was to be "hip, slim, cerebral, sexy and... a martial-arts master," and portrayed by actor Russell Wong, the film did not come to fruition. Actress Lucy Liu was slated to star in and executive-produce a new Charlie Chan film for Fox. The film was in preproduction by 2000; as of 2009, it was slated to be produced, but it also did not come to fruition.

=== Radio ===
On radio, Charlie Chan was heard in several different series on three networks (the NBC Blue Network, Mutual, and ABC) between 1932 and 1948 for the 20th Century Fox Radio Service. Walter Connolly initially portrayed Chan on Esso Oil's Five Star Theater, which serialized adaptations of Biggers novels. Ed Begley, Sr. had the title role in N.B.C.'s The Adventures of Charlie Chan (1944–45), followed by Santos Ortega (1947–48). Leon Janney and Rodney Jacobs were heard as Lee Chan, Number One Son, and Dorian St. George was the announcer. Radio Life magazine described Begley's Chan as "a good radio match for Sidney Toler's beloved film enactment."

=== Stage ===
Valentine Davies wrote a stage adaptation of novel Keeper of the Keys for Broadway in 1933, with William Harrigan as the lead. The production ran for 25 performances.

=== Television adaptations ===
- In 1956–57, The New Adventures of Charlie Chan, starring J. Carrol Naish in the title role, were made independently for TV syndication in 39 episodes, by Television Programs of America. The series was filmed in England. In this series, Chan is based in London rather than the United States. Ratings were poor, and the series was canceled.
- In the 1970s, Hanna-Barbera produced an animated series called The Amazing Chan and the Chan Clan. Keye Luke, who had played Chan's son Lee in many Chan films of the 1930s and late '40s, lent his voice to Charlie, employing a much-expanded vocabulary; Luke thus became the first actual Chinese person to portray Chan on screen. (The title character bears some resemblance to the Warner Oland depiction of Charlie Chan.) The series focused on Chan's children, played initially by East Asian-American child actors before being recast, due to concerns that younger viewers would not understand the accented voices. Leslie Kumamota voiced Chan's daughter Anne, before being replaced by Jodie Foster.
- The Return of Charlie Chan, a television film starring Ross Martin as Chan, was made in 1971 but did not air until 1979.
- Charlie Chan, a television series starring Tzi Ma and Rae Dawn Chong, was reported by Variety to be in development in 2026.

=== Comics ===
Alfred Andriola's Charlie Chan (6 June 1940)

A Charlie Chan comic strip, drawn by Alfred Andriola, was distributed by the McNaught Syndicate beginning October 24, 1938. Andriola was chosen by Biggers to draw the character. Following the Japanese attack on Pearl Harbor, the strip was dropped; the last strip ran on May 30, 1942. In 2019, The Library of American Comics reprinted one year of the strip (1938) in their LoAC Essentials line of books (ISBN 978-1-68405-506-7).

Over decades, other Charlie Chan comic books have been published: Joe Simon and Jack Kirby created Prize Comics' Charlie Chan (1948), which ran for five issues. It was followed by a Charlton Comics title which continued the numbering (four issues, 1955). DC Comics published The New Adventures of Charlie Chan, a 1958 tie-in with the TV series; the DC series lasted for six issues. Dell Comics did the title for two issues in 1965. In the 1970s, Gold Key Comics published a short-lived series of Chan comics based on the Hanna-Barbera animated series. In March through August 1989 Eternity Comics/Malibu Graphics published Charlie Chan comic books numbers 1 - 6 reprinting daily strips from January 9, 1939 to November 18, 1939.

=== Games ===
In addition, a board game, The Great Charlie Chan Detective Mystery Game (1937), and a Charlie Chan Card Game (1939), have been released.

== Modern interpretations and criticism ==
The character of Charlie Chan has been the subject of controversy. Some find the character to be a positive role model, while others argue that Chan is an offensive stereotype. Critic John Soister argues that Charlie Chan is both; when Biggers created the character, he offered a unique alternative to stereotypical evil Chinamen, a man who was at the same time "sufficiently accommodating in personality... unthreatening in demeanor... and removed from his Asian homeland... to quell any underlying xenophobia."

Critic Michael Brodhead argues that "Biggers's sympathetic treatment of the Charlie Chan novels convinces the reader that the author consciously and forthrightly spoke out for the Chinese – a people to be not only accepted but admired. Biggers's sympathetic treatment of the Chinese reflected and contributed to the greater acceptance of Chinese-Americans in the first third of [the twentieth] century." S. T. Karnick writes in the National Review that Chan is "a brilliant detective with understandably limited facility in the English language [whose] powers of observation, logic, and personal rectitude and humility made him an exemplary, entirely honorable character." Ellery Queen called Biggers's characterization of Charlie Chan "a service to humanity and to inter-racial relations." Dave Kehr of The New York Times said Chan "might have been a stereotype, but he was a stereotype on the side of the angels." Keye Luke, an actor who played Chan's son in a number of films, agreed; when asked if he thought that the character was demeaning to the race, he responded, "Demeaning to the race? My God! You've got a Chinese hero!" and "[W]e were making the best damn murder mysteries in Hollywood."

Other critics, such as sociologist Yen Le Espiritu and Huang Guiyou, argue that Chan, while portrayed positively in some ways, is not on a par with white characters, but a "benevolent Other" who is "one-dimensional". The films' use of white actors to portray East Asian characters indicates the character's "absolute Oriental Otherness;" the films were only successful as "the domain of white actors who impersonated heavily-accented masters of murder mysteries as well as purveyors of cryptic proverbs." Chan's character "embodies the stereotypes of Chinese Americans, particularly of males: smart, subservient, effeminate." Chan is representative of a model minority, the good stereotype that counters a bad stereotype: "Each stereotypical image is filled with contradictions: the bloodthirsty Indian is tempered with the image of the noble savage; the bandido exists along with the loyal sidekick; and Fu Manchu is offset by Charlie Chan." However, Fu Manchu's evil qualities are presented as inherently Chinese, while Charlie Chan's good qualities are exceptional; "Fu represents his race; his counterpart stands away from the other Asian Hawaiians."

Some argue that the character's popularity is dependent on its contrast with stereotypes of the Yellow Peril or Japanese people in particular. American opinion of China and Chinese Americans grew more positive in the 1920s and '30s in contrast to the Japanese, who were increasingly viewed with suspicion. Sheng-mei Ma argues that the character is a psychological over-compensation to "rampant paranoia over the racial other."

In June 2003, the Fox Movie Channel canceled a planned Charlie Chan Festival, soon after beginning restoration for cablecasting, after a special-interest group protested. Fox reversed its decision two months later, and on 13 September 2003, the first film in the festival was aired on Fox. The films, when broadcast on the Fox Movie Channel, were followed by round-table discussions by prominent East Asians in the American entertainment industry, led by George Takei, most of whom were against the films. Collections such as Frank Chin's Aiiieeeee! An Anthology of Asian-American Writers and Jessica Hagedorn's Charlie Chan Is Dead are put forth as alternatives to the Charlie Chan stereotype and "[articulate] cultural anger and exclusion as their animating force." Fox has released all of its extant Charlie Chan features on DVD, and MGM along with Warner Bros. (the current proprietors of the Monogram library) has issued all of the Sidney Toler and Roland Winters Monogram features on DVD.

Modern critics, particularly Asian Americans, continue to have mixed feelings on Charlie Chan. Fletcher Chan, a defender of the works, argues that the Chan of Biggers's novels is not subservient to white characters, citing The Chinese Parrot as an example; in this novel, Chan's eyes blaze with anger at racist remarks and in the end, after exposing the murderer, Chan remarks "Perhaps listening to a 'Chinaman' is no disgrace." In the films, both Charlie Chan in London (1934) and Charlie Chan in Paris (1935) "contain scenes in which Chan coolly and wittily dispatches other characters' racist remarks." Yunte Huang manifests an ambivalent attitude, stating that in the US, Chan "epitomizes the racist heritage and the creative genius of this nation's culture." Huang also suggests that critics of Charlie Chan may have themselves, at times, "caricatured" Chan himself.

Chan's character has also come under fire for "nuggets of fortune cookie Confucius" and the "counterfeit proverbs" which became so widespread in popular culture. The Biggers novels did not introduce the "Confucius say" proverbs, which were added in the films, but one novel features Chan remarking: "As all those who know me have learned to their distress, Chinese have proverbs to fit every possible situation." Huang Yunte gives as examples "Tongue often hang man quicker than rope," "Mind, like parachute, only function when open," and "Man who flirt with dynamite sometime fly with angels." He argues, however, that these "colorful aphorisms" display "amazing linguistic acrobatic skills." Like the "signifying monkey" of African American folklore, Huang continues, Chan "imparts as much insult as wisdom."

== Bibliography ==
- Biggers, Earl Derr. The House Without a Key. New York: Bobbs-Merrill, 1925.
- —. The Chinese Parrot. New York: Bobbs-Merrill, 1926.
- —. Behind That Curtain. New York: Bobbs-Merrill, 1928.
- —. The Black Camel. New York: Bobbs-Merrill, 1929.
- —. Charlie Chan Carries On. New York: Bobbs-Merrill, 1930.
- —. Keeper of the Keys. New York: Bobbs-Merrill, 1932.
- Davis, Robert Hart. Charlie Chan in the Temple of the Golden Horde. 1974. Charlie Chan's Mystery Magazine. Reprinted by Wildside Press, 2003. ISBN 1-59224-014-3.
- Lynds, Dennis. Charlie Chan Returns. New York: Bantam Books, 1974. ASIN B000CD3I22.
- Pronzini, Bill, and Jeffrey M. Wallmann. Charlie Chan in the Pawns of Death. 1974. Charlie Chan's Mystery Magazine. Reprinted by Borgo Press, 2003. ISBN 978-1-59224-010-4.
- Churchill, Edward. "Charlie Chan on Broadway". Nov. 1937. Popular Detective.
- Avallone, Michael. Charlie Chan and the Curse of the Dragon Queen. New York: Pinnacle, 1981. ISBN 0-523-41505-2.
- Robert Hart Davis. "The Silent Corpse". Feb.1974. Charlie Chan's Mystery Magazine.
- Robert Hart Davis. "Walk Softly, Strangler". Nov. 1973. Charlie Chan's Mystery Magazine.
- Jon L. Breen. "The Fortune Cookie". May 1971. Ellery Queen's Mystery Magazine.
- Swann, John L. Death, I Said: A Charlie Chan Mystery. Utica, New York: Nicholas K. Burns Publishing, 2023. ISBN 978-0-9755224-5-5.
- Swann, John L. The Tangled String: A Charlie Chan Mystery. Utica, New York: Nicholas K. Burns Publishing, 2024. ISBN 978-0975522479.
- Swann, John L. Beyond Murder: A Charlie Chan Mystery. Utica, New York: Nicholas K. Burns Publishing, 2025. ISBN 979-8999189929.
- Swann, John L. Wheels Within Wheels: A Charlie Chan Mystery. Utica, New York: Nicholas K. Burns Publishing, 2026. ISBN 979-8999189943.

== Filmography ==
Unless otherwise noted, information is taken from Charles P. Mitchell's A Guide to Charlie Chan Films (1999).

American Western

Film title	Starring	Directed by	Theatrical release	DVD release	Notes	Production company
The House Without a Key	George Kuwa	Spencer G. Bennet	1926		Lost; Silent	Pathé Exchange
The Chinese Parrot	Sojin	Paul Leni	1927		Lost; Silent	Universal
Behind That Curtain	E.L. Park	Irving Cummings	1929	Charlie Chan, Volume Three (20th Century Fox, 2007)	First sound film in the series	Fox Film Corporation
Charlie Chan Carries On	Warner Oland	Hamilton MacFadden	1931		Lost Fox simultaneously filmed this with "Eran Trece", which survives.	Fox Film Corporation
Eran Trece	Manuel Arbó	David Howard (uncredited)	1931	Charlie Chan, Volume One (20th Century Fox, 2006)	Fox simultaneously filmed this with "Charlie Chan Carries On".	Fox Film Corporation
The Black Camel	Warner Oland	Hamilton MacFadden	1931	Charlie Chan, Volume Three (20th Century Fox, 2007)		Fox Film Corporation
Charlie Chan's Chance	Warner Oland	John Blystone	1932		Lost	Fox Film Corporation
Charlie Chan's Greatest Case	Warner Oland	Hamilton MacFadden	1933		Lost	Fox Film Corporation
Charlie Chan's Courage	Warner Oland	George Hadden and Eugene Forde	1934		Lost	Fox Film Corporation
Charlie Chan in London	Warner Oland	Eugene Forde	1934	Charlie Chan, Volume One (20th Century Fox, 2006)		Fox Film Corporation
Charlie Chan in Paris	Warner Oland	Lewis Seiler	1935	Charlie Chan, Volume One (20th Century Fox, 2006)		Fox Film Corporation
Charlie Chan in Egypt	Warner Oland	Louis King	1935	Charlie Chan, Volume One (20th Century Fox, 2006)		20th Century Fox
Charlie Chan in Shanghai	Warner Oland	James Tinling	1935	Charlie Chan, Volume One (20th Century Fox, 2006)		20th Century Fox
Charlie Chan's Secret	Warner Oland	Gordon Wiles	1936	Charlie Chan, Volume Three (20th Century Fox, 2007)	Public domain due to the omission of a valid copyright notice on original prints.	20th Century Fox
Charlie Chan at the Circus	Warner Oland	Harry Lachman	1936	Charlie Chan, Volume Two (20th Century Fox, 2006)		20th Century Fox
Charlie Chan at the Race Track	Warner Oland	H. Bruce Humberstone	1936	Charlie Chan, Volume Two (20th Century Fox, 2006)		20th Century Fox
Charlie Chan at the Opera	Warner Oland	H. Bruce Humberstone	1936	Charlie Chan, Volume Two (20th Century Fox, 2006)		20th Century Fox
Charlie Chan at the Olympics	Warner Oland	H. Bruce Humberstone	1937	Charlie Chan, Volume Two (20th Century Fox, 2006)		20th Century Fox
Charlie Chan on Broadway	Warner Oland	Eugene Forde	1937	Charlie Chan, Volume Three (20th Century Fox, 2007)		20th Century Fox
Charlie Chan at Monte Carlo	Warner Oland	Eugene Forde	1937	Charlie Chan, Volume Three (20th Century Fox, 2007)	Oland's last film.	20th Century Fox
Charlie Chan in Honolulu	Sidney Toler	H. Bruce Humberstone	1939	Charlie Chan, Volume Four (20th Century Fox, 2008)		20th Century Fox
Charlie Chan in Reno	Sidney Toler	Norman Foster	1939	Charlie Chan, Volume Four (20th Century Fox, 2008)		20th Century Fox
Charlie Chan at Treasure Island	Sidney Toler	Norman Foster	1939	Charlie Chan, Volume Four (20th Century Fox, 2008)		20th Century Fox
City in Darkness	Sidney Toler	Herbert I. Leeds	1939	Charlie Chan, Volume Four (20th Century Fox, 2008)		20th Century Fox
Charlie Chan in Panama	Sidney Toler	Norman Foster	1940	Charlie Chan, Volume Five (20th Century Fox, 2008)		20th Century Fox
Charlie Chan's Murder Cruise	Sidney Toler	Eugene Forde	1940	Charlie Chan, Volume Five (20th Century Fox, 2008)		20th Century Fox
Charlie Chan at the Wax Museum	Sidney Toler	Lynn Shores	1940	Charlie Chan, Volume Five (20th Century Fox, 2008)		20th Century Fox
Murder Over New York	Sidney Toler	Harry Lachman	1940	Charlie Chan, Volume Five (20th Century Fox, 2008)		20th Century Fox
Dead Men Tell	Sidney Toler	Harry Lachman	1941	Charlie Chan, Volume Five (20th Century Fox, 2008)		20th Century Fox
Charlie Chan in Rio	Sidney Toler	Harry Lachman	1941	Charlie Chan, Volume Five (20th Century Fox, 2008)		20th Century Fox
Castle in the Desert	Sidney Toler	Harry Lachman	1942	Charlie Chan, Volume Five (20th Century Fox, 2008)		20th Century Fox
Charlie Chan in the Secret Service	Sidney Toler	Phil Rosen	1944	The Charlie Chan Chanthology (MGM, 2004)		Monogram Pictures
The Chinese Cat	Sidney Toler	Phil Rosen	1944	The Charlie Chan Chanthology (MGM, 2004)		Monogram Pictures
Black Magic	Sidney Toler	Phil Rosen	1944	The Charlie Chan Chanthology (MGM, 2004)		Monogram Pictures
The Jade Mask	Sidney Toler	Phil Rosen	1945	The Charlie Chan Chanthology (MGM, 2004)		Monogram Pictures
The Scarlet Clue	Sidney Toler	Phil Rosen	1945	The Charlie Chan Chanthology (MGM, 2004)	Public domain due to the omission of a valid copyright notice on original prints.	Monogram Pictures
The Shanghai Cobra	Sidney Toler	Phil Karlson	1945	The Charlie Chan Chanthology (MGM, 2004)		Monogram Pictures
The Red Dragon	Sidney Toler	Phil Rosen	1946	Charlie Chan 3-Film Collection (Warner Archive, 2016)		Monogram Pictures
Dark Alibi	Sidney Toler	Phil Karlson	1946	TCM Spotlight: Charlie Chan Collection (Turner Classic Movies, 2010)	Public domain due to the omission of a valid copyright notice on original prints.	Monogram Pictures
Shadows Over Chinatown	Sidney Toler	Terry O. Morse	1946	Charlie Chan Collection (Warner Home Video, 2013)		Monogram Pictures
Dangerous Money	Sidney Toler	Terry O. Morse	1946	TCM Spotlight: Charlie Chan Collection (Turner Classic Movies, 2010)	Public domain due to the omission of a valid copyright notice on original prints.	Monogram Pictures
The Trap	Sidney Toler	Howard Bretherton	1946	TCM Spotlight: Charlie Chan Collection (Turner Classic Movies, 2010)	Public domain due to the omission of a valid copyright notice on original prints. Toler's last film.	Monogram Pictures
The Chinese Ring	Roland Winters	William Beaudine	1947	TCM Spotlight: Charlie Chan Collection (Turner Classic Movies, 2010)	Public domain due to the omission of a valid copyright notice on original prints. First Chan film with Roland Winters.	Monogram Pictures
Docks of New Orleans	Roland Winters	Derwin Abrahams	1948	Charlie Chan Collection (Warner Home Video, 2013)		Monogram Pictures
Shanghai Chest	Roland Winters	William Beaudine	1948	Charlie Chan Collection (Warner Home Video, 2013)		Monogram Pictures
The Golden Eye	Roland Winters	William Beaudine	1948	Charlie Chan Collection (Warner Home Video, 2013)	Public domain due to the omission of a valid copyright notice on original prints.	Monogram Pictures
The Feathered Serpent	Roland Winters	William Beaudine	1948	Charlie Chan 3-Film Collection (Warner Archive, 2016)		Monogram Pictures
Sky Dragon	Roland Winters	Lesley Selander	1949	Charlie Chan 3-Film Collection (Warner Archive, 2016)		Monogram Pictures
The Return of Charlie Chan (aka: Happiness Is a Warm Clue)	Ross Martin	Daryl Duke	1973		TV film	Universal Television
Charlie Chan and the Curse of the Dragon Queen	Peter Ustinov	Clive Donner	1981			American Cinema Productions

Latin America

Film title	Starring	Directed by	Theatrical release	DVD release	Notes	Production company
La Serpiente Roja	Aníbal de Mar	Ernesto Caparrós	1937		Cuban film	
El Monstruo en la Sombra	Orlando Rodríguez	Zacarias Urquiza	1955		Mexican film	

China

Film title	Starring	Directed by	Theatrical release	DVD release	Notes
The Disappearing Corpse (in Chinese)	Xu Xinyuan	Xu Xinfu	1937		
The Pearl Tunic (in Chinese)	Xu Xinyuan	Xu Xinfu	1938		
The Radio Station Murder (in Chinese)	Xu Xinyuan	Xu Xinfu	1939		
Charlie Chan Smashes an Evil Plot (in Chinese)	Xu Xinyuan	Xu Xinfu	1941		
Charlie Chan Matches Wits with the Prince of Darkness (in Chinese)	Xu Xinyuan	Xu Xinfu	1948		
Mystery of the Jade Fish (in Chinese)	Lee Ying	Lee Ying	c.1950 (distributed in New York in 1951)		

== See also ==
- Portrayal of East Asians in Hollywood
- Mr. Wong
