= Charlie Chan's Chance =

1932 film

- Directed by: John G. Blystone
- Written by: Earl Derr Biggers (novel and suggestions); Barry Conners; Philip Klein
- Produced by: Joseph H. August
- Starring: Warner Oland; Alexander Kirkland; H. B. Warner
- Cinematography: Joseph H. August
- Edited by: Alex Troffey
- Production company: Fox Film Corporation
- Distributed by: Fox Film Corporation
- Release date: January 1932
- Running time: 73 minutes
- Country: United States
- Language: English

Charlie Chan's Chance is a 1932 American pre-Code murder mystery film, the third to star Warner Oland as detective Charlie Chan. It is based on the 1928 novel Behind That Curtain by Earl Derr Biggers, who also contributed to the film. The film is considered to be lost.

== Plot ==
Charlie Chan is attending a police convention in New York City; he is an intended murder victim here, but avoids death by chance. To find his would-be-killer(s), Charlie must outguess police reps from both Scotland Yard and New York City Police.

== Cast ==
- Warner Oland as Charlie Chan
- Alexander Kirkland as John R. Douglas
- H. B. Warner as Inspector Fife
- Marian Nixon as Shirley Marlowe
- Linda Watkins as Gloria Garland
- James Kirkwood as Inspector Flannery
- Ralph Morgan as Barry Kirk
- James Todd as Kenneth Dunwood
- Herbert Bunston as Garrick Enderly
- James Wang as Kee-Lin
- Joe Brown as Doctor
- Charles McNaughton as Paradise
- Edward Peil Sr. as Li Gung

Cast notes:

- Thomas A. Curran the early American silent film star plays an uncredited bit part.

== Critical reception ==
Film critic Mordaunt Hall wrote in The New York Times that Chan "again proves himself to be the king-pin of criminologists," and that although the story is "somewhat confused," it has "some ingenious scenes, particularly one in which a vengeful Oriental hopes to kill Charlie Chan, but is foiled by a cat." Hall further noted that "Oland is the mainstay of this picture."

Variety described the film as "a compact, frequently suspenseful and sufficiently convincing detective feature." The reviewer offered praise for the "realism" of the set design, including the New York City skyline as seen from a penthouse, and the "standout technical detail ... of the East River at night" which was described as "scenic excellence."

Harrison's Reports gave a positive review, and wrote that the film was "The most entertaining detective and murder mystery produced in a long time; it holds one in tense suspense."

== See also ==
- List of lost films
- 1937 Fox vault fire
