= Charlie Chan in Egypt =

1935 Charlie Chan film directed by Louis King

- Directed by: Louis King
- Screenplay by: Robert Ellis; Helen Logan
- Based on: Charlie Chan; 1919 articles by Earl Derr Biggers
- Produced by: Edward T. Lowe Jr.
- Starring: Warner Oland
- Cinematography: Daniel B. Clark
- Edited by: Alfred DeGaetano
- Music by: Samuel Kaylin
- Production company: Fox Film Corporation
- Distributed by: 20th Century-Fox Film Corporation
- Release date: June 21, 1935
- Running time: 73 min.
- Country: United States

Charlie Chan in Egypt is a 1935 American film directed by Louis King and starring Warner Oland and Pat Paterson. It was the eighth of sixteen 20th Century Fox Charlie Chan films starring Oland in the title role.

== Plot ==
Charlie Chan is brought in when an archaeologist disappears while excavating ancient art treasures in Egypt. Charlie must sort out the stories of the archaeological team, deal with the crazed son of the missing scientist, learn why priceless treasures are falling into the hands of private collectors, and battle many seemingly supernatural events. Chan's initial journey begins with a rickety biplane ride and then a desert trip by pack mule ("Offspring of Satan", mutters Chan at his animal). But there are more creature comforts at Professor Arnold's mansion, where Chan meets his beautiful daughter Carol. The Professor has been missing two weeks, and Carol vehemently defends him against charges of dishonesty. And her boyfriend Tom vehemently defends the daughter.

Dr. Racine has loaned the expedition a large amount of money when it began to run out of funds; and Professor Thurston confesses that the items that turned up in museums had been sold by him, also to replenish funding. Carol's brother Barry has been rendered lame by an accident at the site, and is prone to playing sad songs on his violin. Servant girl Nayda is in the background, innocent, but acting a little suspiciously, perhaps to confuse the questions of who done it, or who is in on it. Butler Edfu Ahmed says the family is "marked for death" for violating the tomb. The other family servant, Snowshoes, can be described as "weak but willing" when it comes to danger.

There is a complete scientific laboratory in the basement, to catalogue discoveries. Chan notices the seal on a sarcophagus has been broken. They X-ray it and discover a 20th-century bullet lodged in the "Mummy", which turns out to be Professor Arnold's corpse; drained of blood and mummified to remove giveaway decay.

Carol has suffered unexplained attacks of sleepiness and anxiety; Chan discovers her personal cigarettes had been laced with a hallucinatory drug. While playing his violin, Barry suddenly keels over dead. Butler Ahmed flees rather than be questioned, which throws suspicion on him. Local policeman Inspector Soueida is overly formal but competent; and requests Chan's assistance.

Chan discounts the supernatural, as the murders have been committed by someone with sharp knowledge of modern science. He discovers that Barry had been killed when a high note from his violin shattered a glass vial filled with poison gas.

Exploring the tomb at night with an eager Tom Evans, they discover a secret room that can be reached only while swimming underwater. The contents are many looted treasures and some elaborate "ghost" disguises. It also contains the murderer, who shoots Tom point blank. Chan and Snowshoes manage to get Tom back to the mansion, where he hovers between life and death. Chan says since he was shot from the front, he must know the killer's identity and will reveal it when he recovers. This is the cue for the murderer to try to finish the job; but Chan and a small brigade of Egyptian police are waiting and take the killer into custody.

Spotting Carol and Tom embracing, Chan declares this is all the reward he requires for his efforts.

== Cast ==
- Warner Oland as Charlie Chan
- Pat Paterson as Carol Arnold, whose father has disappeared, and is engaged to Tom Evans
- Thomas Beck as Tom Evans, an archaeologist assisting Professor Arnold at the Pyramids
- Rita Hayworth as Nayda (billed as Rita Cansino)
- Jameson Thomas as Dr. Anton Racine
- Frank Conroy as Professor John Thurston, Carol and Barry's uncle
- Nigel De Brulier as Edfu Ahmed, the Arnold family's servant
- James Eagles as Barry Arnold, Carol's brother
- George Erving as Professor Arnold, leader of the expedition to the Pyramids
- Stepin Fetchit as Snowshoes, assistant on the expedition
- Paul Porcasi as Inspector Soueida of Luxor Police
- Arthur Stone as Dragoman; larcenous Native Guide

== Critical response ==
Writing in The New York Times, critic Andre Sennwald described the film as "a lively and entertaining if somewhat minor mystery work," that "it keeps the killer in plain sight all the time, giving every man a chance to defeat Charlie in the guessing contest," and that Chan's "shrewd and amiable passage from clue to clue is always more important than his final revelation." It was also noted that "Stepin Fetchit, the master of slow motion [...] manages as usual to be both hilarious and unintelligible." Variety reported that the film "combines a suavely sustained concept of drama and another surehanded interpretation of the central role by Warner Oland," and noted that "Next to Oland's, the standout performance is that of Eagles, whose superstitious fears drive him to near insanity."
