= Charlie Chan's Greatest Case =

1933 film

- Theatrical release poster
- Directed by: Hamilton MacFadden
- Written by: Earl Derr Biggers (novel); Lester Cole; Marion Orth
- Starring: Warner Oland; Heather Angel
- Production company: Fox Film Corporation
- Distributed by: Fox Film Corporation
- Release date: September 15, 1933
- Running time: 70 minutes
- Country: United States
- Language: English

Charlie Chan's Greatest Case is a 1933 American pre-Code murder mystery film starring Warner Oland as the Oriental detective Charlie Chan. It was based on the Earl Derr Biggers novel The House Without a Key (1925).

Oland made a series of Charlie Chan films; along with three others, this one is considered to be a lost film.

== Plot ==
In Honolulu's Waikiki, two brothers, Dan and Amos Winterslip have had a decades-long feud which worsens when Dan announces his engagement to a scandalous, younger woman. When Dan is found murdered in his beachside home, Charlie Chan is called on to investigate. As the list of suspects grows, the case becomes increasingly dangerous for both Charlie Chan and Dan’s nephew, John Quincy, who seeks to find his uncle’s killer.

== Cast ==
- Warner Oland as Charlie Chan
- Heather Angel as Carlotta Eagan
- Roger Imhof as The Beachcomber
- John Warburton as John Quincy Winterslip
- Walter Byron as Henry Jennison
- Ivan F. Simpson as Brade
- Virginia Cherrill as Barbara Winterslip
- Francis Ford as Captain Hallett
- Robert Warwick as Dan Winterslip
- Frank McGlynn Sr. as Amos Winterslip
- Clara Blandick as Minerva Winterslip
- Claude King as Capt. Arthur Cope
- William Stack as James Eagan
- Gloria Roy as Arlene Compton
- Cornelius Keefe as Steve Letherbee
- Frances Chan as Youngest Chan Daughter

== Reception ==
The New York Times reviewer wrote, "As far as the mystery of these particular murders is concerned it is not difficult for the audience to decide on the identity of the slayer, but the manner in which Chan makes his deductions is always interesting."
