= There Were Thirteen =

1931 film

- Directed by: David Howard
- Written by: Earl Derr Biggers (novel); Barry Conners; Philip Klein
- Produced by: William Fox
- Starring: Juan Torena; Ana María Custodio; Rafael Calvo
- Cinematography: Sidney Wagner
- Production company: Fox Film Corporation
- Distributed by: Fox Film Corporation
- Release date: December 4, 1931
- Running time: 79 minutes
- Country: United States
- Language: Spanish

There Were Thirteen (Spanish: Eran trece) is a 1931 American Pre-Code mystery film directed by David Howard and starring Juan Torena, Ana María Custodio, and Rafael Calvo, with Manuel Arbó as Charlie Chan.

It is a Spanish-language version of the 1931 Hollywood film Charlie Chan Carries On, with a separate cast and several plot alterations. Like the English original, which has been lost, it was based on the 1930 novel Charlie Chan Carries On by Earl Derr Biggers.

== Cast ==
- Juan Torena as Dick Kennaway
- Ana María Custodio as Elen Potter
- Rafael Calvo as Inspector Duff
- Raul Roulien as Max Minchin
- Blanca de Castejón as Peggy Minchin
- Miguel Ligero as Frank Benbow
- Amelia Santee as Señora Benbow
- Carmen Rodríguez as Señora Rockwel
- Julio Villarreal as Dr. Lofton
- José Nieto as Capitán Kin
- Carlos Díaz de Mendoza as Walter Decker
- Lia Torá as Sybil Conway
- Martin Garralaga as John Ross
- Antonio Vidal as Paul Nielson
- Ralph Navarro as Inspector Gardner
- Manuel Arbó as Charlie Chan

== Bibliography ==
- Jarvinen, Lisa. The Rise of Spanish-language Filmmaking: Out from Hollywood's Shadow, 1929-1939. Rutger's University Press, 2012.
