= Behind That Curtain (film) =

1929 film

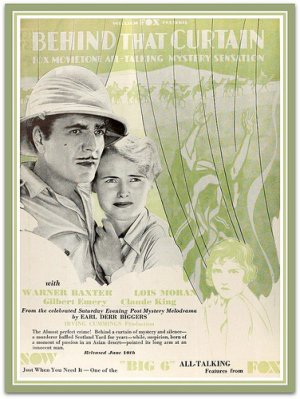
- Film poster
- Directed by: Irving Cummings
- Written by: Sonya Levien; George Middleton; Wilbur Morse Jr. Clarke Silvernail
- Based on: Behind That Curtain by Earl Derr Biggers
- Produced by: William Fox
- Starring: Warner Baxter; Lois Moran; Gilbert Emery
- Cinematography: Conrad Wells; Vincent J. Farrar; Dave Ragin
- Edited by: Alfred DeGaetano
- Production company: Fox Film Corporation
- Distributed by: Fox Film Corporation
- Release date: June 30, 1929
- Running time: 91 minutes
- Country: United States
- Language: English

Behind That Curtain (1929)

Behind That Curtain is a 1929 American sound (All-Talking) pre-Code mystery film directed by Irving Cummings and starring Warner Baxter, Lois Moran and Gilbert Emery. It was the first Charlie Chan film to be made at Fox Studios. It was based on the 1928 novel of the same name. Charlie Chan, who is played by the Chinese American E. L. Park, gets one mention early in the film, then makes a few momentary appearances after 75 minutes. Park, in fact, was the first Chinese American to play Charlie Chan on-screen. Producer William Fox chose this film to open the palatial Fox Theatre in San Francisco on June 28, 1929. It is a sound film.

== Synopsis ==
In London, fortune hunter Eric Durand is romancing the wealthy Sir George Mannering's niece Eve. He murders the solicitor who is hired by Mannering to investigate him and, marrying Eve, takes her to British India. Eve realizes too late that her abusive husband is a philanderer and murderer and seeks protection with her old family friend, explorer Colonel John Beetham, who takes her away on his latest expedition. She is followed by the dogged Sir Frederick Bruce of Scotland Yard, who has Durand in his sights, but missed her in India and again in Persia as she leaves Beetham and flees to San Francisco. She is also followed by her husband, in pursue of an incriminating letter that could tie him to the murder. It is only here that San Francisco Detective Inspector Charlie Chan becomes directly involved in the case and brings the matter to a close.

== Cast ==
- Warner Baxter as Col. John Beetham
- Lois Moran as Eve Mannering Durand
- Gilbert Emery as Sir Frederick Bruce
- Claude King as Sir George Mannering
- Philip Strange as Eric Durand
- Boris Karloff as Beetham's Manservant
- Jamiel Hasson as Sahib Hana
- Peter Gawthorne as British Police Inspector
- John Rogers as Alf Pornick
- Edgar Norton as Hilary Galt
- E.L. Park as Police Insp. Charlie Chan

== Production ==
Two weeks were spent filming on location at Death Valley.

== See also ==
- Boris Karloff filmography
- List of early sound feature films (1926–1929)

== Bibliography ==
- Backer, Ron. Mystery Movie Series of 1930s Hollywood. McFarland, 2012.
- Solomon, Aubrey. The Fox Film Corporation, 1915-1935: A History and Filmography. McFarland, 2011.
