= Dark Alibi =

1946 film

- Directed by: Phil Karlson
- Written by: Earl Derr Biggers (characters); George Callahan (writer)
- Produced by: James S. Burkett
- Starring: See below
- Cinematography: William A. Sickner
- Edited by: Ace Herman
- Music by: Edward J. Kay
- Production company: Monogram Pictures
- Distributed by: Monogram Pictures
- Release date: May 25, 1946
- Running time: 61 minutes
- Country: United States
- Language: English

Dark Alibi

Dark Alibi is a 1946 American mystery film directed by Phil Karlson featuring Sidney Toler as Charlie Chan. The working titles were Charlie Chan in Alcatraz and Fatal Fingerprints.

== Plot ==
Thomas Harley, an ex-convict, is wrongfully arrested for a bank robbery he did not commit. The police have found fingerprints on the crime scene, incriminating Harley. Harley claims to have been summoned to a theatrical warehouse by Dave Wyatt, an old cellmate—but Wyatt has been dead for eight years. Subsequently, Harley is sentenced to death and awaits his execution.

Harley's daughter June asks private investigator Charlie Chan for help to prove her father's innocence. Hearing about the suspicious circumstances, Chan immediately agrees to take the case. With only nine days before Harley's execution, Chan questions Harley's landlady Mrs. Foss, struggling tenant Miss Petrie, bookkeeper Mr. Johnson, salesman Mr. Danvers, and showgirl Emily Evans, whose work costume was found in the warehouse near the crime scene.

As Chan comes closer to solving the mystery, two of the suspects are murdered. Chan follows a number of clues, and thinks that Harley's fingerprints may have been forged. Working closely with a police technician, Chan proves his theory to be correct.

Chan returns to the warehouse and finds the equipment used to forge fingerprints. There he finds the murderer, who tries to do away with Chan. Chan solves the remaining mystery by identifying the true leader of the robbery gang, and Harley is released from prison.

== Cast ==
- Sidney Toler as Charlie Chan
- Benson Fong as Tommy Chan
- Mantan Moreland as Birmingham Brown
- Ben Carter as Benjamin Brown
- Teala Loring as June Harley
- George Holmes as Hugh Kenzie
- Joyce Compton as Emily Evans
- John Eldredge as Morgan
- Russell Hicks as Warden Cameron
- Tim Ryan as Foggy
- Janet Shaw as Miss Petrie
- Edward Earle as Thomas Harley
- Ray Walker as Danvers
- Milton Parsons as Johnson
- Edna Holland as Mrs. Foss
- Anthony Warde as Jimmy Slade
- George Eldredge as Brand

== Reception ==
Thalia Bell of Motion Picture Daily raved, "One of the best of the Charlie Chan series to date. James S. Burkett's production evidences craftsmanship at every point, and Phil Karlson's direction gets the best out of a cast of experienced players. Sidney Toler as the Chinese detective is his usual suave self. Considerable comedy is contributed by Benson Fong as Chan's son, and the routine between the two Negro comics Mantan Moreland and Ben Carter is positively hilarious. George Callahan's screenplay [is] more ingenious and credible than most in this category."

Film Daily agreed: "Better-than-average story and good direction lifts this above the series normal level. This is one of the best Charlie Chan offerings." Independent Exhibitors Film Bulletin said, "Dark Alibi is better than recent entires in Monogram's Charlie Chan series and will adequately fill the supporting spot on due bills in minor naborhood [sic] and action houses. Two hilarious vaudeville patter routines between those two likable negro comics, Mantan Moreland and Ben Carter, break the monotony of the mysterious happenings." Showmen's Trade Review praised Moreland and Carter as "clever" but took exception to Moreland's scared-reaction comedy in the warehouse sequence: "The antics are outdated and in poor taste, presenting Moreland as the epitome of stupidity and rank fear."

== Copyright status ==
While some presume the film to be in the public domain, due to the omission of a valid copyright notice on original-release prints, Dark Alibi was indeed registered for copyright by Monogram Pictures on March 26, 1946 (certificate number LP184).
