= The Chinese Parrot =

1926 novel by Earl Derr Biggers

- First edition cover
- Author: Earl Derr Biggers
- Language: English
- Series: Charlie Chan
- Genre: Mystery Novel
- Publisher: Curtis
- Publication date: 1926
- Publication place: United States
- Media type: Print (Hardback and paperback)
- Preceded by: The House Without a Key
- Followed by: Behind That Curtain

The Chinese Parrot (1926) is the second novel in the Charlie Chan series of mystery novels by Earl Derr Biggers and is the first in which Chan travels from Hawaii to mainland California.

The story concerns a valuable string of pearls which is purchased by a wealthy and eccentric financier. The handsome young son of the jeweller is assigned to deliver the pearls to the financier's vacation home in a desert area of California. Because of his long association with the owner of the pearls (before joining the police force, he was her houseboy), Charlie Chan travels from Hawaii to California to also look after the pearls. After two mysterious deaths, first of a Chinese-speaking parrot and then of the household's Chinese man-of-all-work, Charlie Chan masquerades as a pidgin-speaking cook named Ah Kim and works undercover to solve the crimes. Along the way, the jeweller's son meets a beautiful young woman who works as a location scout and he decides to stay in the California desert.

== Film, TV or theatrical adaptations ==
The novel was adapted for film twice, as The Chinese Parrot in 1927 and as Charlie Chan's Courage in 1934 (both of which are considered lost films).
