= Agony column =

Agony column may refer to:

- The Agony Column, a novel by Earl Derr Biggers
- A column of a newspaper that contains advertisements of missing relatives and friends
- The Agony Column, an alternative title to the 1918 film The Blind Adventure
- Advice column in a newspaper
- Agony Column, a heavy metal band from Texas
