= The Chinese Parrot (film) =

1927 film by Paul Leni

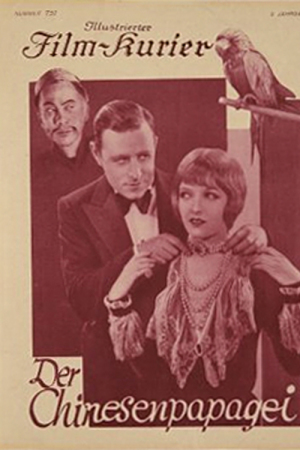
- Directed by: Paul Leni
- Written by: J. Grubb Alexander (scenario); Walter Anthony (intertitles)
- Based on: The Chinese Parrot by Earl Derr Biggers
- Starring: Marian Nixon; Florence Turner; Hobart Bosworth
- Cinematography: Benjamin H. Kline
- Distributed by: Universal Pictures
- Release date: October 23, 1927
- Running time: 7 reels; 7,304 feet
- Country: United States
- Language: Silent (English intertitles)

The Chinese Parrot is a 1927 American silent mystery film, the second in the Charlie Chan series. It was directed by Paul Leni and starred Japanese actor Sōjin Kamiyama as Chan. The film is an adaptation of the 1926 Earl Derr Biggers novel The Chinese Parrot. Another version of the novel was filmed in 1934 and is entitled Charlie Chan's Courage.

== Plot ==
As described in a film magazine, Sally Randall, daughter of a rich Hawaiian planter, marries Philmore, the man of her father's choice, thereby jilting her lover P.J. Madden. Tearing from her throat the priceless pearls that are her father's wedding gift, Madden declares that one day he will buy her at the same price. Twenty years later, Mrs. Sally Philmore, now a widow, is forced to sell the pearls in San Francisco. The purchaser, by chance, turns out to be Madden, now a millionaire. Madden insists that Mrs. Philmore, accompanied by her daughter Sally, deliver the pearls to his desert hacienda the next day. Madden is imprisoned by some thugs in his own house. Delaney, who looks very much like Madden, impersonates him when Sally and Robert Eden, son of the jeweler through whom the sale is made, arrive. Charlie Chang, the Chinese detective in charge of the pearls, has already hired himself as a cook in Madden's household. While at dinner, the parrot yells, “Help! I’m being murdered.” Detective Chang talks to the bird in Chinese with no avail. Robert demands the pearls from Chang and is about to deliver them to Delaney when an interruption occurs. Robert puts them under a newspaper only to find a moment later that they are gone. Much excitement reigns but finally, the parrot tells all. Madden is released, the crooks captured, Mrs. Philmore and Madden reconciled, and Robert and Sally united.

== Cast ==
- Marian Nixon as Sally Phillmore
- Florence Turner as Mrs. Phillmore
- Hobart Bosworth as P.J. Madden
- Edmund Burns as Robert Eden
- Albert Conti as Martin Thorne
- Sōjin Kamiyama as Charlie Chan
- Fred Esmelton as Alexander Eden
- Edgar Kennedy as Maydorf
- George Kuwa as Louis Wong
- Slim Summerville as Prospector
- Dan Mason as Prospector
- Anna May Wong as Nautch Dancer
- Etta Lee as Girl in Gambling Den
- Jack Trent as Jordan
- Frank Toy as number one son

== Preservation ==
With no prints of The Chinese Parrot located in any film archives, it is a lost film.
