= The House Without a Key (serial) =

1926 film

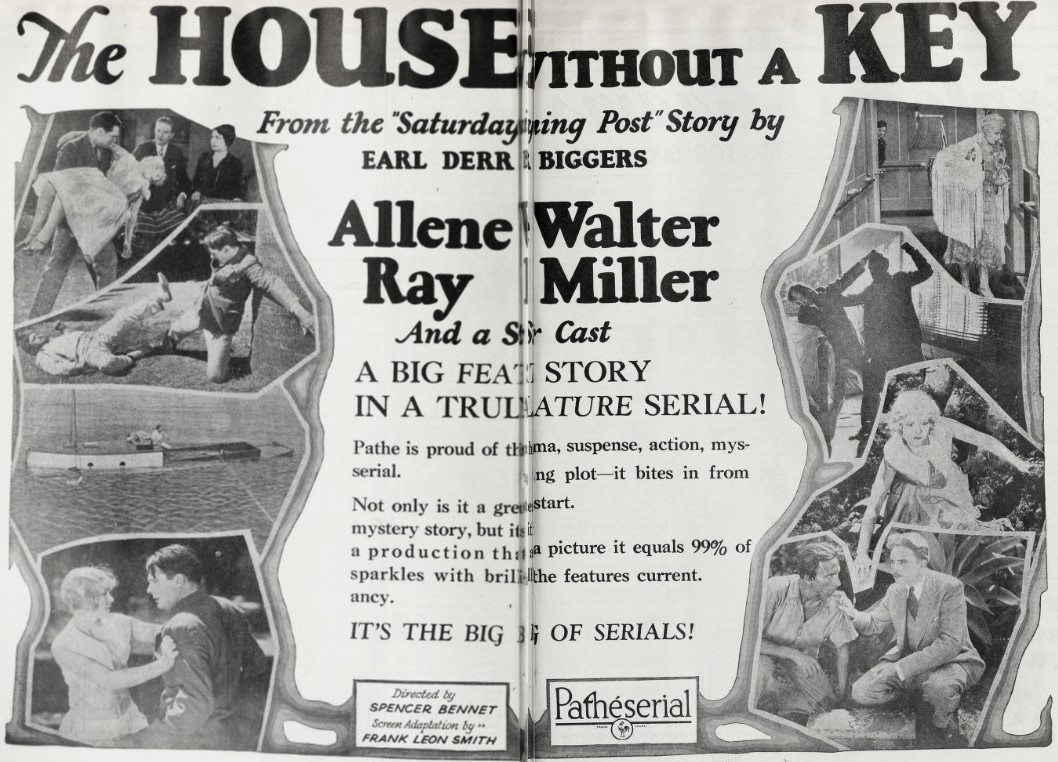
- Advertisement
- Directed by: Spencer Gordon Bennet
- Written by: Frank Leon Smith
- Based on: The House Without a Key by Earl Derr Biggers
- Starring: Allene Ray; Walter Miller
- Distributed by: Pathé Exchange
- Release date: November 21, 1926
- Running time: 10 episodes
- Country: United States
- Language: Silent (English intertitles)

The House Without a Key is a 1926 American mystery serial film directed by Spencer Gordon Bennet. It is based on the 1925 novel of the same name and is the first onscreen appearance of the fictional detective Charlie Chan, although the main stars are Allene Ray and Walter Miller. The serial film is now considered to be lost.

== Cast ==
- Allene Ray as Carry Egan
- Walter Miller as John Quincy Winterclip
- E. H. Calvert as Dan Winterclip
- Betty Caldwell as Barbara Winterclip
- Natalie Warfield as Minerva Winterclip
- Jack Pratt as James Egan
- William Bailey as Harry Jennison (credited as William Norton Bailey)
- Frank Lackteen as Kaohla
- George Kuwa as Charlie Chan
- Harry Semels as Saladine
- Charles West as Bowker (credited as Charles H. West)
- John Cossar as District Attorney
- Scott Seaton as Detective
- Cliff Saum as Kennedy
- John Webb Dillion
- Shia Jung as The young Chinese girl (uncredited)

== Chapter titles ==
1. The Spite Fence
2. The Mystery Box
3. The Missing Numeral
4. Suspicion
5. The Death Buoy
6. Sinister Shadows
7. The Mystery Man
8. The Spotted Menace
9. The Wrist Watch
10. The Culprit

== See also ==
- List of film serials
- List of film serials by studio
