= Daniel B. Clark =

American cinematographer (1890–1961)

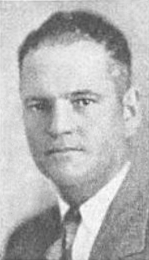
- From a 1926 magazine
- Born: April 28, 1890; Missouri, United States
- Died: November 14, 1961 (aged 71); San Bernardino, California; United States
- Other names: Daniel Bryan Clark; Dan Clark
- Occupation: Cinematographer

Daniel B. Clark (April 28, 1890 – November 14, 1961) was an American cinematographer. He worked on around a hundred films and television series during his career. During the late 1920s he was president of the American Society of Cinematographers.

== Selected filmography ==
- The Lone Star Ranger (1919)
- Catch My Smoke (1922)
- Tom Mix in Arabia (1922)
- Just Tony (1922)
- Up and Going (1922)
- Do and Dare (1922)
- The Fighting Streak (1922)
- Three Jumps Ahead (1923)
- The Lone Star Ranger (1923)
- North of Hudson Bay (1923)
- Stepping Fast (1923)
- The Heart Buster (1924)
- The Trouble Shooter (1924)
- Oh, You Tony! (1924)
- Dick Turpin (1925)
- Riders of the Purple Sage (1925)
- The Lucky Horseshoe (1925)
- The Best Bad Man (1925)
- My Own Pal (1926)
- Hard Boiled (1926)
- The Great K & A Train Robbery (1926)
- The Yankee Señor (1926)
- The Broncho Twister (1927)
- The Circus Ace (1927)
- Daredevil's Reward (1928)
- The Last of the Duanes (1930)
- Rough Romance (1930)
- Harmony at Home (1930)
- The Black Camel (1931)
- My Pal, the King (1932)
- Destry Rides Again (1932)
- Charlie Chan in Paris (1935)
- Charlie Chan in Egypt (1935)
- Back to Nature (1936)
- Educating Father (1936)
- Charlie Chan at the Circus (1936)
- Champagne Charlie (1936)
- Step Lively, Jeeves! (1937)
- Charlie Chan at the Olympics (1937)
- Charlie Chan at Monte Carlo (1937)
- Five of a Kind (1938)

== Bibliography ==
- Tag Gallagher. John Ford: The Man and His Films. University of California Press, 1988.
