= Charlie Chan's Courage =

1934 film by Eugene Forde

- Directed by: Eugene Forde; George Hadden
- Written by: Earl Derr Biggers (novel); Seton I. Miller
- Produced by: John Stone
- Starring: Warner Oland
- Production company: Fox Film Corporation
- Distributed by: Fox Film Corporation
- Release date: July 6, 1934
- Running time: 70 minutes
- Country: United States
- Language: English

Charlie Chan's Courage (1934) is the fifth film in which Warner Oland played detective Charlie Chan. It is a remake of the 1927 silent film The Chinese Parrot, based upon the novel by Earl Derr Biggers. Both are considered lost films.

An audio recreation accompanied by still photographs from the original film is included as a special feature on some DVD collections.

== Plot ==
Hired to deliver a valuable necklace for Sally Jordon, a wealthy Honolulu resident for whom Charlie Chan had worked as a houseboy decades earlier, the detective shows up at the desert ranch estate of P.J. Madden, posing as a servant. In his servant guise, Charlie monitors the comings and goings of a number of suspects as it becomes apparent that a murder has taken place at the Madden estate.

== Cast ==
- Warner Oland as Charlie Chan
- Drue Leyton as Paula Graham
- Donald Woods as Bob Crawford
- Paul Harvey as P.J. Madden / Jerry Delaney
- Murray Kinnell as Martin Thorne
- Reginald Mason as Alexander Crawford
- Virginia Hammond as Mrs. Sally Jordan
- Si Jenks as Will Holley
- Harvey Clark as Professor Gamble
- Jerry Jerome as Maydorf
- Jack Carter as Victor Jordan
- James Wang as Wong
- DeWitt Jennings as Constable Brackett (as DeWitt C. Jennings)
- Francis Ford as Hewitt
- Frank Mills as Prop Man
