= Charlie Chan Carries On (film) =

1931 film

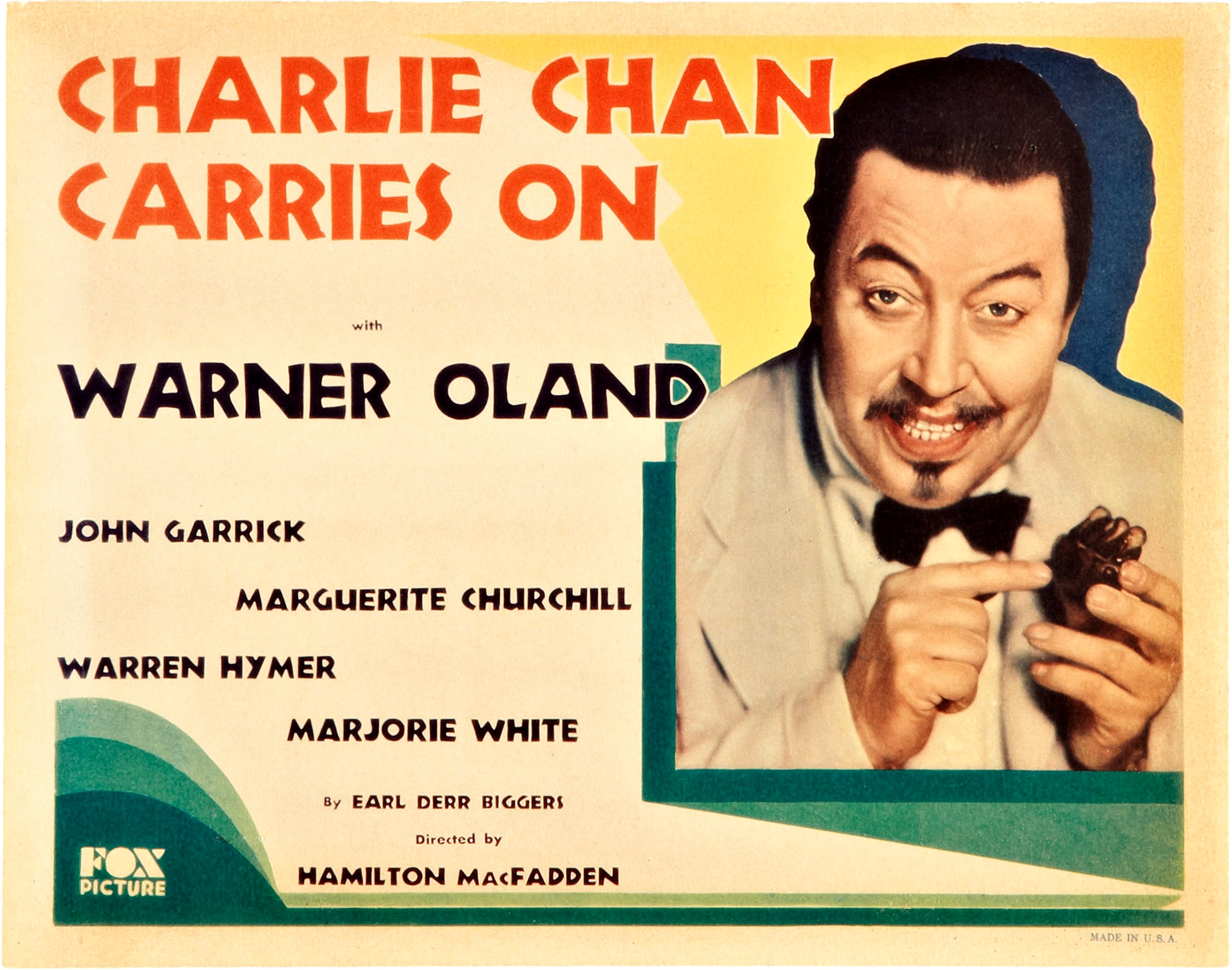
- Lobby card
- Directed by: Hamilton MacFadden
- Written by: Barry Conners; Philip Klein
- Based on: Charlie Chan Carries On by Earl Derr Biggers
- Produced by: Sol M. Wurtzel
- Starring: Warner Oland; John Garrick; Marguerite Churchill; Warren Hymer
- Cinematography: George Schneiderman
- Edited by: Alfred DeGaetano
- Music by: Samuel Kaylin
- Production company: Fox Film Corporation
- Distributed by: Fox Film Corporation
- Release date: April 12, 1931
- Running time: 76 minutes
- Country: United States
- Language: English

Charlie Chan Carries On is a 1931 American pre-Code mystery film directed by Hamilton MacFadden and starring Warner Oland, John Garrick and Marguerite Churchill. It is the first appearance of Warner Oland as Charlie Chan. Part of the long-running Charlie Chan series, it was based on the 1930 novel of the same title by Earl Derr Biggers. It is now considered a lost film; however, Fox simultaneously filmed a Spanish-language version which was released under the title Eran Trece—There Were Thirteen—and this version survives.

== Plot ==
Charlie Chan tries to solve the murder of a wealthy American found dead in a London hotel room. Settings include London, Nice, France, San Remo, Honolulu and Hong Kong.

== Cast ==
- Warner Oland as Charlie Chan
- John Garrick as Mark Kenaway
- Marguerite Churchill as Pamela Potter
- Warren Hymer as Max Minchin
- Marjorie White as Sadie
- C. Henry Gordon as John Ross
- William Holden as Patrick Tait
- George Brent as Capt. Ronald Keane
- Peter Gawthorne as Inspector Duff
- John T. Murray as Dr. Lofton
- Goodee Montgomery as Mrs. Benbow
- Jason Robards Sr. as Walter Honeywood
- Lumsden Hare as Inspector Hayley
- Zeffie Tilbury as Mrs. Luce
- Betty Francisco as Sybil Conway
- Harry Beresford as Kent
- John Rogers as Martin

== Critical reception ==
Writing in The New York Times, critic Mordaunt Hall described the film as "amusing and suspenseful," reported that Oland "serves [Chan] exceedingly well [and his] conception of Chan's manner of speaking is quite acceptable, and he relies on very little change in his appearance to play the part," and noted that Chan's dialog "told upon the audience yesterday afternoon so well that one could have listened to Charlie Chan for an hour longer." Variety reported that the film was "well directed and aptly photographed," that "the mystery angle is kept paramount," and that "between Hymer and Oland in their contrasting roles, the customers can be assured of enjoyable laughter."

== Bibliography ==
- Hanke, Ken. Charlie Chan at the Movies: History, Filmography, and Criticism. McFarland, 1990.
