= Hamilton MacFadden =

American actor (1901–1977)

- Born: April 26, 1901
- Died: January 1, 1977 (aged 75)
- Education: Harvard University
- Occupations: Actor; Writer; Director
- Years active: 1930–1945 (film)
- Spouses: Violet Dunn (m. 1929; div. 1933); Ruth Channing (m. 1934; div. 1949); Vada Roberts Ward (m. 1949)

Hamilton MacFadden (April 26, 1901 – January 1, 1977) was an American actor, screenwriter and film director.

== Early years ==
MacFadden's parents were Rev. Robert A. MacFadden and Edith Hamilton MacFadden. His father died in 1909, leaving his mother to support herself and four children. In 1928, she became the first woman to file papers to run for governor of Massachusetts.

== Career ==
MacFadden was a 1925 graduate of Harvard University. Soon after graduating, he became producer of the American Theatre Company, which presented plays for 10 weeks in the Boston area. The project was backed by Michael Strange, a writer who made her professional stage debut in the productions. He also served as director of the Community Arts Association in Santa Barbara, California, and the Theatre Guild School of Acting in New York.

Plays that MacFadden produced on Broadway included Gods of the Lightning and La Gringa. After starting out on Broadway in the 1920s, he moved into filmmaking in Hollywood. During the early 1930s he was a contract director at Fox. McFadden made a number of films for them including several early entries in the Charlie Chan series such as Charlie Chan Carries On (1931). He was released from his Fox contract following the 1934 merger with Twentieth Century Pictures. Thereafter he mixed occasional directing jobs with a number of small supporting appearances in films.

Later in his career, MacFadden was associate chief of the United States Department of State's international motion picture division.

== Personal life ==
MacFadden married actress Violet Dunn on March 30, 1929, in New York City. She obtained a divorce from him on September 20, 1933. On September 29, 1934, he married actress Ruth Channing in Santa Barbara, California; they were divorced in 1949. He married actress Vada Roberts Ward on October 29, 1949, in Fairfield, Connecticut.

== Selected filmography ==
=== Director ===
- Harmony at Home (1930)
- Crazy That Way (1930)
- Oh, For a Man! (1930)
- Are You There? (1930)
- Charlie Chan Carries On (1931)
- The Black Camel (1931)
- Riders of the Purple Sage (1931)
- Charlie Chan's Greatest Case (1933)
- As Husbands Go (1934)
- Stand Up and Cheer! (1934)
- Sea Racketeers (1937)
- The Legion of Missing Men (1937)
- Escape by Night (1937)
- It Can't Last Forever (1937)
- Three Legionnaires (1937)
- Inside the Law (1942)

=== Actor ===
- The Black Camel (1931) - Val Martino (uncredited)
- Keep Smiling (1938) - Director (uncredited)
- Time Out for Murder (1938) - One of the Reporters (uncredited)
- Touchdown, Army (1938) - Coach Shelby (uncredited)
- Five of a Kind (1938) - Andrew Gordon
- Tarnished Angel (1938) - Reverend Summers
- Sharpshooters (1938) - Bowman
- While New York Sleeps (1938) - Pete - Reporter (uncredited)
- Pardon Our Nerve (1939) - Announcer (uncredited)
- Unmarried (1939) - Assistant Coach (uncredited)
- Charlie Chan in Reno (1939) - Night Clerk
- The Jones Family in Hollywood (1939) - Townsend - Director
- Chicken Wagon Family (1939) - Auctioneer
- Shooting High (1940) - J. Wallace Rutledge
- The Lady in Question (1940) - Guard (uncredited)
- Pier 13 (1940) - Reporter (uncredited)
- Yesterday's Heroes (1940) - Reporter (uncredited)
- Michael Shayne, Private Detective (1940) - Reporter (uncredited)
- The Reluctant Dragon (1941) - Himself
- Ride, Kelly, Ride (1941) - Race Track Steward
- Sleepers West (1941) - Conductor Meyers
- Dressed to Kill (1941) - Reporter
- Charlie Chan in Rio (1941) - Bill Kellogg
- Young America (1942) - Jim Benson
- Wilson (1944) - Minor Role (uncredited) (final film role)
