= Charlie Chan in Rio =

1941 film by Harry Lachman

- Theatrical release poster
- Directed by: Harry Lachman
- Written by: Samuel G. Engel; Lester Ziffren
- Produced by: Sol M. Wurtzel
- Starring: Sidney Toler; Victor Sen Yung; Kay Linaker
- Cinematography: Joseph MacDonald
- Edited by: Alex Troffey
- Music by: Emil Newman
- Production company: 20th Century Fox
- Distributed by: 20th Century Fox
- Release date: September 5, 1941
- Running time: 62 minutes
- Country: United States
- Language: English

Charlie Chan in Rio is a 1941 American mystery film directed by Harry Lachman and featuring the Asian detective Charlie Chan. It was the tenth film to feature Sidney Toler as the title character, who is called upon to investigate the death of a suspected murderer in Rio de Janeiro, Brazil.

== Plot ==
In the beginning of the film, detective Charlie Chan is in Rio de Janeiro, Brazil, along with his son, Jimmy, and the Rio chief of police, Chief Souto, to arrest singer Lola Dean, whom Chan suspects killed a man in Honolulu. After a performance, Lola's boyfriend, Carlos, asks her to marry him, which she accepts. Her personal assistant, Helen Ashby, then reminds Lola she has an appointment with a Hindu psychic, Marana. Lola visits the psychic, who puts her in a semi-comatose state using coffee and cigarettes laced with a special natural herb. Lola reveals in this state that she did kill a man, Manuel Cardozo, after he refused to marry her in Honolulu. The psychic records the conversation. When Lola wakes up, the psychic tells her what she told him, but assures her that it will be kept confidential between them. On the way home, a worried Lola convinces Carlos to elope instead of marrying at a later date. When she arrives home, she begins packing.

Later, Chan, Jimmy, and Chief Souto arrive at Lola's house to arrest her, but instead find her dead in her room. The three conclude that Lola was murdered, and spot many obvious clues which they realize were left there on purpose to throw them off. They also notice Lola's jewelry missing. Chan then informs Lola's guests, who were there to celebrate her engagement, of her death, and brings in two suspects, the psychic and Paul Wagner. Wagner reveals that he was married to Lola, but they had separated. The psychic plays back his conversation with Lola, and reveals himself to be Alfredo Cardozo, the brother of the man Lola killed. Chief Souto asks everyone to stay in the house while the murder is being investigated.

Later, Jimmy witnesses a conversation between Lola's butler, Rice, and maid, Lilly. Rice tells Lilly to stay quiet about something she saw earlier. Chan and Souto find scratch marks on the floor where Lola was murdered. Chan suspects that the scratch marks were from the brooch Lola was wearing, and that a pin on that brooch would still be stuck in the murderer's shoe. Chan then finds similar scratch marks under one of the chairs at the dinner table where all of the guests had dined. Jimmy hides in Rice's room and finds Lola's jewelry there. He then takes Rice to Chan. Rice explains that he has the jewels but did not kill Lola. Before he can tell Chan who did, the lights go out and he is shot.

Chan then asks all of the guests to go back to their original positions at the dinner table. He reveals to them that the scratch marks he found were under Helen's chair. When Helen protests her innocence, Chan suggests Cardozo put her in the semi-comatose state. When she still says she did not kill Lola, Chan asks that he go under the same treatment using the same cigarette. But when he does, Chan is unaffected. Cardozo tries to admit to killing Lola, but Helen stops him, revealing she did it. She further explains that she was the wife of Manuel Cardozo. After hearing of Alfredo's conversation with Lola, Helen learned Lola was going to elope. Realizing that Lola was going to leave and escape justice, Helen killed her. When Rice walked in on the act, she offered him the jewels to keep him quiet, and later shot him. Chief Souto then arrests Helen and takes her to jail. Jimmy asks to take Lilly back to Honolulu with him, but Chan tells him he has been drafted in the United States Army.

== Cast ==
- Sidney Toler as Charlie Chan
- Victor Sen Yung as Jimmy Chan
- Harold Huber as Chief Souto
- Iris Wong as Lili Wong
- Kay Linaker as Helen Ashby / Barbara Cardozo
- Ted North as Carlos Dantas
- Victor Jory as Marana / Alfredo Cardozo
- Leslie Denison as Rice
- Hamilton MacFadden as Bill Kellogg
- Jacqueline Dalya as Lola Dean / Lola Wagner
- Truman Bradley as Paul Wagner
- Eugene Borden as Armando
- Mary Beth Hughes as Joan Reynolds
- Cobina Wright Jr. as Grace Ellis
- Richard Derr as Ken Reynolds
- Ann Codee as Margo

== Production ==
Although not stated as a remake, the film follows the same basic storyline as The Black Camel from 1931.

== Release ==
The film was originally released on September 5, 1941.

=== Home media ===
This film was released on VHS tape on September 1, 1998 (OCLC 20215496). It was released on DVD as part of Charlie Chan Collection, Volume 5 on September 16, 2008 (OCLC 543796310).
