= Shanghai (1935 film) =

1935 American film directed by James Flood

- Directed by: James Flood
- Written by: C. Graham Baker; Lynn Starling; Gene Towne
- Produced by: Walter Wanger
- Starring: Loretta Young; Charles Boyer; Warner Oland
- Cinematography: James Van Trees
- Edited by: Otho Lovering
- Music by: Frederick Hollander
- Production companies: Walter Wanger Productions; Paramount Pictures
- Distributed by: Paramount Pictures
- Release date: July 20, 1935 (New York City)
- Running time: 75 minutes
- Country: United States
- Language: English / German
- Budget: $260,601
- Box office: $511,225

Shanghai is a 1935 American romantic drama film directed by James Flood, produced by Walter Wanger, distributed by Paramount Pictures, and starring Loretta Young and Charles Boyer. The picture's supporting cast features Warner Oland, Alison Skipworth, Charley Grapewin, Olive Tell and Keye Luke, and the running time is 75 minutes.

== Plot ==
While she is in Shanghai visiting her sick aunt, young New York socialite Barbara Howard falls in love with Russian banker Dmitri Koslov. Everything would be for the best, if only Dmitri were not keeping a secret that could jeopardize their union: he is only half-Russian, and the other half is Chinese.

== Cast ==
- Loretta Young as Barbara Howard
- Charles Boyer as Dimitri Koslov
- Warner Oland as Ambassador Lun Sing
- Alison Skipworth as Aunt Jane
- Fred Keating as Tommy Sherwood
- Charley Grapewin as Truesdale
- Walter Kingsford as Hilton
- Josephine Whittell as Mrs. Truesdale
- Olive Tell as Mrs. Hilton
- Libby Taylor as Corona, Maid
- Keye Luke as Chinese Ambassador's Son
- Willie Fung as Wang (as Willy Fung)
- Boothe Howard as Manager, Broker's Office
- Arnold Korff as Van Hoeffer

== Reception ==
The film made a profit of $142,246.
