= Charlie Chan at Monte Carlo =

1937 film by Eugene Forde

- Directed by: Eugene Forde
- Screenplay by: Charles Belden; Jerome Cady
- Story by: Robert Ellis; Helen Logan
- Produced by: John Stone
- Starring: Warner Oland; Keye Luke; Virginia Field
- Cinematography: Daniel B. Clark
- Edited by: Nick DeMaggio
- Music by: Samuel Kaylin
- Production company: 20th Century-Fox
- Distributed by: 20th Century-Fox
- Release date: December 17, 1937 (New York City)
- Running time: 72 minutes
- Country: United States
- Language: English

Charlie Chan at Monte Carlo is a 1937 American mystery film directed by Eugene Forde and starring Warner Oland, Keye Luke and Virginia Field. The main character is Charlie Chan, a Chinese-Hawaiian detective. This was the sixteenth and final Charlie Chan film with Oland portraying Chan. The film features Keye Luke as Charlie's son Lee and character actor Harold Huber as a French police inspector. It was produced and distributed by 20th Century-Fox.

Warner Oland contracted bronchial pneumonia during his visit to Sweden and died there on August 6, 1938, at age 57. The series continued at Fox for another eleven entries with Sidney Toler. In 1942 Fox sold it to Monogram Pictures, and it continued on even after Toler's death in 1947 with Roland Winters in the role through six films into 1949. Keye Luke would also reprise his role as Lee Chan from the film in Mr. Moto's Gamble (1938), a film originally produced to be a Charlie Chan film prior to Oland's death.

== Plot summary ==
Although Charlie and Lee are in Monaco for an art exhibit, they become caught up in a feud between rival financiers which involves the Chans in a web of blackmail and murder. The messenger for millionaire Victor Karnoff is ambushed and murdered, and $1,000,000.00 worth of bonds go missing. The Chans' taxicab breaks down and they decide to proceed on foot. Continuing along the road in their attempt to make the train to Paris, they pass the crime scene. The Police arrive and in the confusion, they're detained. The Chans ultimately become involved in the investigation, with the blessing of the local law Chief Joubert (Huber).

Later on, a bartender who was apparently attempting to blackmail Karnoff's wife is also murdered, and the bonds found in his room. But Chan notices that in order to make certain the bonds were discovered, their briefcase had been opened with a special key that very few people had access to, and the bartender was not one of them.

Back at the Karnoff mansion, Chan exposes the killer, who had been embezzling in order to keep femme' fatale Evelyn Grey (Field) in the style to which she had become accustomed.

== Cast ==
- Warner Oland as Charlie Chan
- Keye Luke as Lee Chan
- Virginia Field as Evelyn Grey
- Sidney Blackmer as Victor Karnoff
- Harold Huber as Chief of Police Jules Etienne Joubert
- Kay Linaker as Joan Karnoff
- Robert Kent as Gordon Chase
- Edward Raquello as Paul Savarin
- George Lynn as Al Rogers
- John Bleifer as Ludwig
- Eugene Borden as Hotel Clerk (uncredited)
- Leo White as French Butler (uncredited)

== Critical reception ==
Film critic Frank Nugent wrote in The New York Times that "if you've seen one [Chan film]—and you must have—you know about what to expect," that the film "invariably produces a gratifyingly astonishing dénouement," that "is interesting enough, with slight touches of humor and graced by the presence of a competent supporting cast," and that "Forde has directed it casually, which is the proper treatment."

== Bibliography ==
- Backer, Ron. Mystery Movie Series of 1930s Hollywood. McFarland, 2012.
