= Keeper of the Keys =

Book by Earl Derr Biggers

- First edition cover
- Author: Earl Derr Biggers
- Language: English
- Series: Charlie Chan
- Genre: Mystery, Novels
- Publisher: Bobbs-Merrill
- Publication date: 1932
- Publication place: United States
- Media type: Print (hardback & paperback)
- Preceded by: Charlie Chan Carries On

Keeper of the Keys (1932) is the sixth and last mystery in the Charlie Chan series of Earl Derr Biggers; Biggers was planning on continuing the series, but died in 1933 before he could. The films continued the series for him.

== Plot summary ==
The setting of the novel is rural California, where Chan has been invited as a houseguest. He meets a world-famous soprano, Ellen Landini, who is murdered not too long after the meeting. Chan does not have far to look for suspects—the host is her fourth ex-husband, and the other three are among the house guests. Her servants, entourage and former husbands all come under suspicion. Once again, Chan is expected to solve the murder, which he does by understanding the key clues—the actions of a little dog named Trouble, two scarves, and two little boxes. When he understands how the murder is committed, he learns the role of elderly house servant Ah Sing—the keeper of the keys.

== Film, TV or theatrical adaptations ==
This was the only one of Biggers' Chan novels never to be adapted into a film, while some of the others were used more than once to create films. However, it was adapted into a short-lived Broadway play in 1933, by Valentine Davies, with William Harrigan playing Charlie Chan.
