= The Black Camel =

1929 novel by Earl Derr Biggers

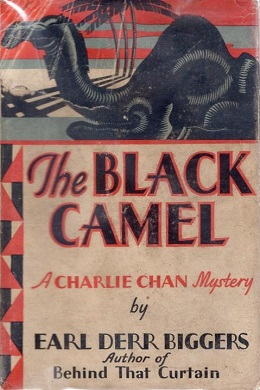
- First edition dust cover
- Author: Earl Derr Biggers
- Language: English
- Series: Charlie Chan
- Genre: Mystery, Novels
- Publisher: Bobbs-Merrill
- Publication date: 1929
- Publication place: United States
- Media type: Print (Hardback & Paperback)
- Preceded by: Behind That Curtain
- Followed by: Charlie Chan Carries On

The Black Camel (1929) is the fourth of the Charlie Chan novels by Earl Derr Biggers.

== Plot summary ==
It tells the story of a Hollywood star (Shelah Fane), who is stopping in Hawaii after she finished shooting a film on location in Tahiti. She is murdered in the pavilion of her rental house in Waikiki during her stay. The story behind her murder is linked with the three-year-old murder of another Hollywood actor and also connected with an enigmatic psychic named Tarneverro. Chan, in his position as a detective with the Honolulu Police Department, "investigates amid public clamor demanding that the murderer be found and punished immediately. "Death is a black camel that kneels unbidden at every gate. Tonight black camel has knelt here", Chan tells the suspects."

== Film, TV or theatrical adaptations ==
It was adapted into a film of the same name based on the book and released in 1931. This was the second of a series of sixteen Chan films to feature Warner Oland as the sleuth.
