= Yen Le Espiritu =

American sociologist

Yến Lê Espiritu
- Citizenship: United States

Academic background
- Education: UC San Diego (BA, 1985); UC Los Angeles (MA, 1987; PhD, 1990)

Academic work
- Discipline: Sociologist
- Institutions: University of California, San Diego
- Main interests: Ethnic Studies, Asian American Studies

Yến Lê Espiritu is an American sociologist. She is the author of Home Bound: Filipino American Lives across Cultures, Communities, and Countries. Her research focuses on immigration and refugee studies, Southeast Asian Studies, transnationalism, Asian American Studies, and US Militarism. Originally from Vietnam, Espiritu is the Distinguished Professor of Ethnic Studies at University of California, San Diego. She is also a founding faculty member of the Critical Refugee Studies Collective.

== Education and academic career ==
Espiritu graduated from UC San Diego in 1985 with a B.A. in communications. She continued to receive a M.A. in sociology in 1987 from University of California, Los Angeles and a Ph.D. in sociology in 1990 from the same institution. She has taught at the Department of Ethnic Studies at UC San Diego since 1990 and has been the chair of the department four times.

== Awards ==
Espiritu's Asian American Panethnicity: Bridging Institutions and Identities has won the 1994 Association for Asian American Studies (AAAS) Book Award. Her Home Bound: Filipino American Lives across Cultures, Communities, and Countries has won the 2005 AAAS Book Award in Social Sciences. She has been awarded the Excellence in Mentoring Award by AAAS in 2012.

== Works ==
- Asian American Panethnicity: Bridging Institutions and Identities. Philadelphia: Temple University Press. 1993. ISBN 978-1-56639-096-5.
- Home Bound: Filipino American Lives across Cultures, Communities, and Countries. University of California Press. 2003. ISBN 978-0-520235-27-4.
- Asian American Women and Men: Labor, Laws, and Love, Second Edition. Rowman & Littlefield. 2008. ISBN 978-0-7425-6061-1.
- Body Counts: The Vietnam War and Militarized Refuge(es). University of California Press. 2014. ISBN 978-0-520277-71-7.
