= Eugene Forde =

American film director (1898–1986)

- Born: 8 November 1898; Providence, Rhode Island
- Died: 27 February 1986 (aged 87); Port Hueneme, California
- Other names: Gene Forde, Eugene J. Forde
- Years active: 1926–1953

Eugene Forde (1898–1986) was an American film director.

== Selected filmography ==
- Daredevil's Reward (1928)
- Painted Post (1928)
- Son of the Golden West (1928)
- Charlie Chan's Courage (1934)
- Charlie Chan in London (1935)
- The Great Hotel Murder (1935)
- Your Uncle Dudley (1935)
- The Country Beyond (1936)
- 36 Hours to Kill (1936)
- The Lady Escapes (1937)
- Step Lively, Jeeves! (1937)
- Charlie Chan on Broadway (1937)
- Midnight Taxi (1937)
- Charlie Chan at Monte Carlo (1938)
- International Settlement (1938)
- Inspector Hornleigh (1938)
- Pier 13 (1940)
- Charlie Chan's Murder Cruise (1940)
- Dressed to Kill (1941)
- Sleepers West (1941)
- Berlin Correspondent (1942)
- The Crimson Key (1947)
- Backlash (1947)
- Jewels of Brandenburg (1947)
- The Invisible Wall (1947)
