= Behind That Curtain =

1928 novel by Earl Derr Biggers

- First edition dust jacket
- Author: Earl Derr Biggers
- Language: English
- Series: Charlie Chan
- Genre: Mystery novel
- Publisher: Bobbs-Merrill
- Publication date: 1928
- Publication place: United States
- Media type: Print (Hardback & Paperback)
- Preceded by: The Chinese Parrot
- Followed by: The Black Camel

Behind That Curtain (1928) is the third novel in the Charlie Chan series of mystery novels by Earl Derr Biggers.

== Plot summary ==
It is set almost exclusively in California (as opposed to Chan's native Hawaii), and tells the story of the former head of Scotland Yard, a detective who is pursuing the long-cold trail of a murderer. Fifteen years ago, a London solicitor was killed in circumstances in which the only clue was a pair of Chinese slippers, which he apparently donned just before his death. Sir Frederic Bruce has been following the trail of the killer ever since. He has also been interested in what appears to be a series of disappearing women around the world, which has some connection to the disappearance of a woman named Eve Durand in rural India also fifteen years ago. Just when it seems he might finally solve the murder case, at a dinner party to which a number of important and mysterious guests have been invited, Inspector Bruce is killed—and was last seen wearing a pair of Chinese slippers, which have vanished. It is left to Chan to solve the case and tie up all loose ends.

== Film, TV or theatrical adaptations ==
It was adapted for film as Behind That Curtain in 1929 and elements were used for Charlie Chan's Chance (now considered a lost film) in 1932. The 1929 film was chosen to open the Fox Theatre in San Francisco on 28 June 1929.

== Release details ==
- 1928, US, Bobbs-Merrill (ISBN NA), Pub date 1928, hardback (first edition)
- 1974, US, Bantam (ISBN 978-0-553-08464-1), July 1974, paperback
- 1974, UK, Corgi Children's (ISBN 0-552-68464-3), October 1974, paperback
- 1984, US, Buccaneer Books (ISBN 0-89966-078-9), December 1984, paperback
- 1987, US, Popular Library (ISBN 0-445-40214-8), April 1987, paperback
- 2005, UK, Dodo Press (ISBN 1-905432-92-5), Pub date September 2005, paperback
