= The House Without a Key =

1925 detective novel starring Charlie Chan

- This is the cover from the Penzler facsimile edition from 1996, a reproduction of the 1925 reprint by Grosset & Dunlap.(1)
- Author: Earl Derr Biggers
- Language: English
- Series: Charlie Chan mysteries
- Genre: Mystery novel
- Publisher: Bobbs-Merrill (1st edition, USA); Harrap (1st edition, UK)
- Publication date: 1925 (1st edition)
- Publication place: United States
- Media type: Print (Paperback (1st edition))
- ISBN: 0-553-08446-1 (Paperback edition (1974) by Bantam (USA)
- OCLC: 227031225
- Followed by: The Chinese Parrot

The House Without a Key is a 1925 novel by Earl Derr Biggers, the first of the Charlie Chan mysteries. Set in 1920s Hawaiʻi, the novel acquaints the reader with the look and feel of the islands from the standpoint of both white and non-white inhabitants, describing social class structures and customs of the era.

== Plot summary ==
The novel deals with the murder of a former member of Boston society who has lived in Hawaiʻi for a number of years. The main character is the victim's nephew, a straitlaced young Bostonian bond trader, who came to the islands to try to convince his aunt Minerva, whose vacation has extended many months, to return to Boston. The nephew, John Quincy Winterslip, soon falls under the spell of the islands himself, meets an attractive young woman, breaks his engagement to his straitlaced Bostonian fiancee Agatha, and decides as the murder is being solved to move to San Francisco. In the interval, he is introduced to many levels of Hawaiian society and is of some assistance to Detective Charlie Chan in solving the mystery.

The novel's denouement is nearly identical to that in the final Perry Mason novel by Erle Stanley Gardner, The Case of the Postponed Murder (1970).

== Adaptations ==
It was adapted for film twice, as The House Without a Key in 1926 and as Charlie Chan's Greatest Case in 1933. In 1942 it was adapted for the stage by Jean Lee Latham and played in Chicago. Another dramatisation by Hal Glatzer played at the Left Coast Crime Conference in Hawai'i in 2009.

== Trivia ==
Charlie Chan does not speak his first word until page 82 (first paperback edition).

The novel was written by Biggers at the Halekulani hotel on Waikīkī Beach which features a restaurant named "House Without a Key".
