= Warner Oland =

Swedish-American actor (1879–1938)

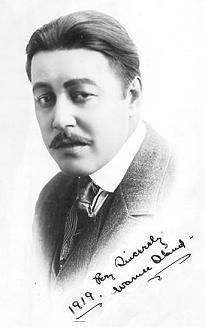
- Oland in 1919
- Born: Johan Verner Ölund; October 3, 1879; Nyby, Bjurholm Municipality, Sweden
- Died: August 6, 1938 (aged 58); Stockholm, Sweden
- Resting place: Southborough Rural Cemetery, Southborough, Massachusetts, US
- Occupation: Actor
- Years active: 1902–1937
- Known for: Charlie Chan
- Spouse: Edith Gardener Shearn (m. 1907–1938)

Warner Oland (born Johan Verner Ölund; October 3, 1879 – August 6, 1938) was a Swedish-American actor. His career included time on Broadway and numerous film appearances. He is most remembered for playing several Chinese and Chinese-American characters: Dr. Fu Manchu, Henry Chang in Shanghai Express, and, most notably, Honolulu Police detective Lieutenant Charlie Chan in 16 films.

== Early years ==
Oland was born in the village of Nyby, Bjurholm Municipality, Västerbotten County, Sweden. He claimed that his vaguely Asian appearance was due to possessing some Mongolian ancestry, though his known ancestry contains no indication that this was so. In his native Sweden, one theory (to explain his appearance) is that Oland's family was possibly of Sami heritage. According to a 2024 biography, there are plenty of Sami people near Oland's place of birth, but that there is not much in Oland's family tree that would suggest that they were of Sami heritage.

When he was 13, Oland's family immigrated to the United States, in November 1892, on board the S/S Thingvalla, which sailed from Christiania, Norway, to New York. After an initial stay in New York City, the family settled in New Britain, Connecticut. Educated in Boston, Oland spoke English and his native Swedish, and eventually translated some of the plays of August Strindberg.

As a young man, Oland pursued a career in theater, at first working on set design while developing his skills as a dramatic actor. In 1906, he was signed to tour the country with the troupe led by Russian-American actress Alla Nazimova (1879–1945). The following year, he met and married the playwright and portrait painter Edith Gardener Shearn (1872-1968). Shearn made an ideal partner for Oland. She mastered Swedish, helping him with the translation of Strindberg's works that they jointly published in book form in 1912.

== Film career ==
=== Career beginnings ===
After several years in theater, including appearances on Broadway as Warner Oland, in 1912 he made his silent film debut in Pilgrim's Progress, a film based on the John Bunyan novel. As a result of his training as a Shakespearean actor and his easy adoption of a sinister look, he was much in demand as a villain and in ethnic roles. Over the next 15 years, he appeared in more than 30 films, including a major role in The Jazz Singer (1927), one of the first talkies produced.

=== Becoming a star ===
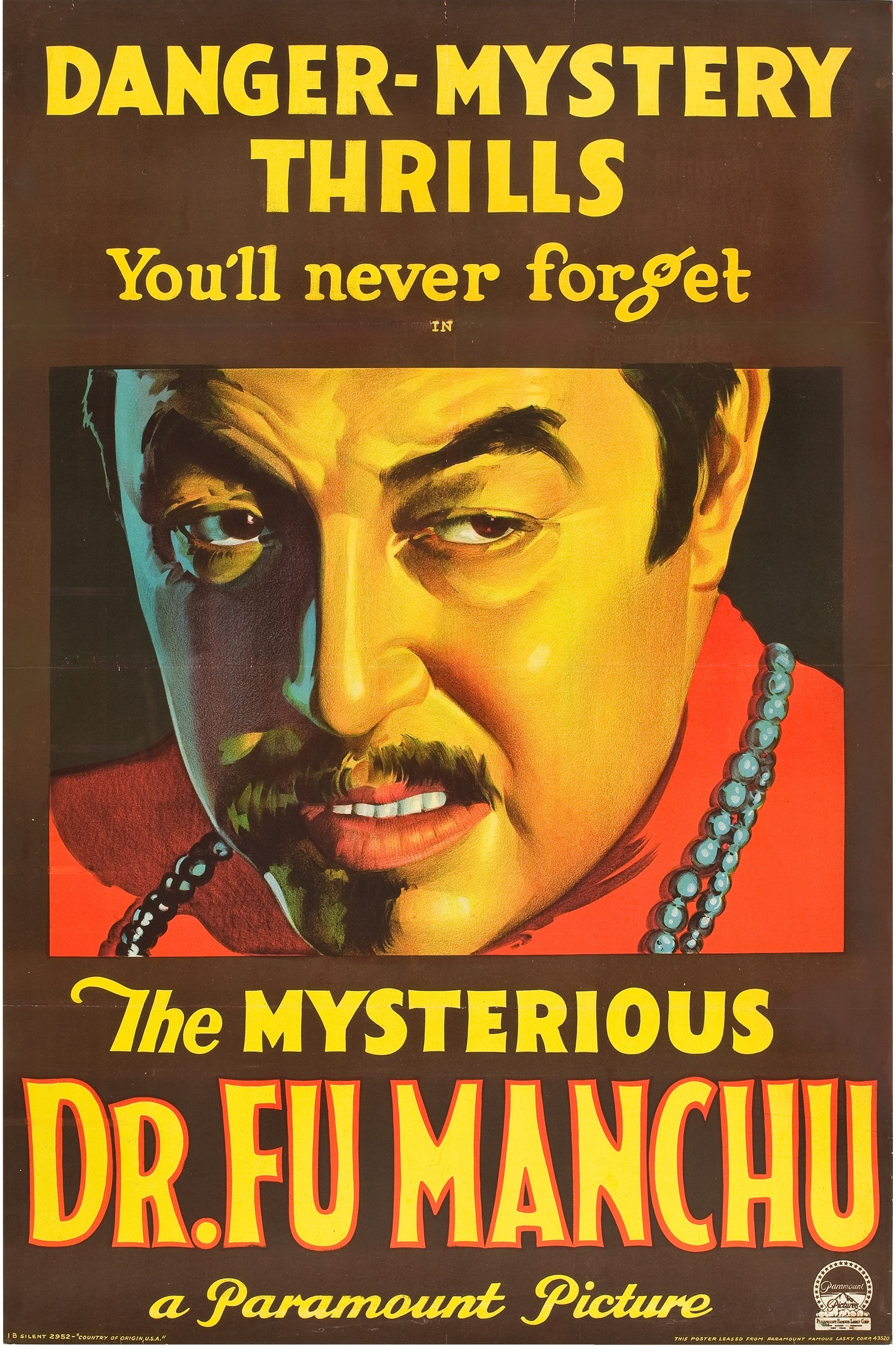
Oland's performance in the 1929 film The Mysterious Dr. Fu Manchu made him a star.

Oland's normal appearance fitted the Hollywood expectation of caricatured Asianness of the time, an early example of 'yellowface' on screen. He portrayed a variety of Asian characters in several movies before being offered the leading role in the 1929 film The Mysterious Dr. Fu Manchu.

A box office success, The Mysterious Dr. Fu Manchu made Oland a star, and during the next two years he portrayed the evil Dr. Fu Manchu in three more films (although the second one was purely a cameo appearance). He was cast as an exotic menace in director Josef von Sternberg's 1932 classic film Shanghai Express opposite Marlene Dietrich and Anna May Wong. In Werewolf of London (1934) Oland played a werewolf, biting the protagonist, played by Henry Hull. After portraying a Chinese ambassador in the 1935 film Shanghai, he abandoned character work and pursued his starring series as Charlie Chan exclusively.

=== The Charlie Chan franchise ===
In 1931, already familiar from his Oriental roles, he was cast as Charlie Chan in the international detective mystery film Charlie Chan Carries On. The enormous worldwide boxoffice success of his Charlie Chan film led to more, with Oland starring in 16 Chan films in total. The series, Jill Lepore later wrote, "kept Fox afloat" during the 1930s, while earning Oland $40,000 per movie. Oland took his role seriously, studying the Chinese language and calligraphy. The scripts almost always called for Oland to comment on the action by offering nuggets of Oriental wisdom: "Hasty deduction like ancient egg. Look good from outside."

== Final years and death ==
Despite his wealth and success, Oland suffered from alcoholism that severely affected his health and his 30-year marriage. In January 1938, he started filming Charlie Chan at the Ringside. However, a week into shooting, he began behaving erratically and eventually walked off the set, causing the film to be abandoned.

After a spell in the hospital, he signed a new three-picture deal with Fox to continue playing Chan. During this period, he was involved in a bitter divorce and was forbidden by court order from traveling overseas or moving his assets abroad. Around this time, he was involved in a public incident when, having ordered his chauffeur to drive him to Mexico, he was observed during a rest stop sitting on the running board of his car throwing his shoes at onlookers.

The divorce settlement, favouring his wife, was announced to the media April 2, 1938. That same day, Oland left the U.S. by steamship. He arrived in southern Europe, then proceeded to his native Sweden, where he stayed with an architect friend. In Sweden, Oland contracted bronchial pneumonia, worsened by the apparent onset of emphysema from years of heavy smoking.

On August 6, 1938, Oland died at age 58 in a Stockholm hospital and was cremated. His ex-wife brought his ashes to the United States for interment in the Southborough (Massachusetts) Rural Cemetery, located in a Boston suburb where the Olands previously lived in an historic farmhouse.

His last film, the unfinished Charlie Chan at the Ringside, was re-shot with Peter Lorre replacing Oland, and released as Mr. Moto's Gamble (1938).

In Autobiography of a Yogi, Paramahansa Yogananda describes his encounter with an unnamed famous actor, presumably Oland, while travelling by train. The actor was initially critical of Yogananda's Indian garb but their conversation soon evolved into an amicable philosophical discussion.

== Filmography ==
- Pilgrim's Progress (1912) as John Bunyan (film debut)
- The Romance of Elaine (1915)
- Sin (1915) as Pietro
- The Unfaithful Wife (1915)
- Destruction (1915) as Mr. Deleveau
- The Fool's Revenge (1916) as Undetermined Secondary Role (uncredited)
- The Reapers (1916) as James Shaw
- The Eternal Sapho (1916) as H. Coudal
- The Eternal Question (1916) as Pierre Felix
- Beatrice Fairfax (1916) as Detective
- The Rise of Susan (1916) as Sinclair La Salle
- Beatrice Fairfax Episode 4: The Stone God (1916) as Detective in office
- Patria (1917, Serial) as Baron Huroki
- The Fatal Ring (1917, Serial) as Richard Carslake
- The Cigarette Girl (1917) as Mr. Wilson
- Convict 993 (1918) as Dan Mallory
- The Naulahka (1918) as Maharajah
- The Mysterious Client (1918) as Boris Norjunov
- The Yellow Ticket (1918) as Baron Andrey
- The Lightning Raider (1919, Serial) as Wu Fang
- Mandarin's Gold (1919) as Li Hsun
- The Twin Pawns (1919) as John Bent
- The Avalanche (1919) as Nick Delano
- The Witness for the Defense (1919) as Captain Ballantyne
- The Third Eye (1920, Serial) as Curtis Steele / Malcolm Graw
- The Phantom Foe (1920, Serial) as Uncle Leo Sealkirk
- The Yellow Arm (1921) as Joel Bain
- Hurricane Hutch (1921, serial) as Clifton Marlow
- East Is West (1922) as Charley Yong
- The Pride of Palomar (1922) as Okada
- His Children's Children (1923) as Dr. Dahl
- The Fighting American (1924) as Fu Shing
- So This Is Marriage? (1924) as Mario Dorando
- One Night in Rome (1924) as King David
- Curlytop (1924) as Shanghai Dan
- Riders of the Purple Sage (1925) as Lew Walters aka Judge Dyer
- Don Q, Son of Zorro (1925) as The Archduke
- Flower of Night (1925) as Luke Rand
- The Winding Stair (1925) as Petras
- Infatuation (1925) as Osman Pasha
- Don Juan (1926) as Cesare Borgia
- The Mystery Club (1926) as Eli Sinsabaugh
- The Marriage Clause (1926) as Max Ravenal
- Twinkletoes (1926) as Roseleaf
- Tell It to the Marines (1926) as Chinese Bandit Chief
- Man of the Forest (1926) as Clint Beasley
- When a Man Loves (1927) as André Lescaut
- A Million Bid (1927) as Geoffrey Marsh
- Old San Francisco (1927) as Chris Buckwell
- What Happened to Father? (1927) as W. Bradberry, Father
- The Jazz Singer (1927) as The Cantor
- Sailor Izzy Murphy (1927) as The girl's father
- Good Time Charley (1927) as Good Time Charley Keene
- Stand and Deliver (1928) as Ghika - the Bandit Leader
- Wheel of Chance (1928) as Mosher Turkeltaub
- The Scarlet Lady (1928) as Zaneriff
- Dream of Love (1928) as The Duke, Current Dictator
- The Faker (1929) as Hadrian (the faker)
- Chinatown Nights (1929) as Boston Charley
- The Studio Murder Mystery (1929) as Rupert Borka
- The Mysterious Dr. Fu Manchu (1929) as Dr. Fu Manchu
- The Mighty (1929) as Sterky
- Dangerous Paradise (1930) as Schomberg
- The Vagabond King (1930) as Thibault
- Paramount on Parade (1930) as Fu Manchu (Murder Will Out)
- The Return of Dr. Fu Manchu (1930) as Dr. Fu Manchu
- The Drums of Jeopardy (1931) as Dr. Boris Karlov
- Dishonored (1931) as Colonel von Hindau
- Charlie Chan Carries On (1931) as Inspector Charlie Chan
- The Black Camel (1931) as Inspector Charlie Chan
- The Big Gamble (1931) as North
- Daughter of the Dragon (1931) as Fu Manchu
- Charlie Chan's Chance (1932) as Inspector Charlie Chan
- Shanghai Express (1932) as Henry Chang
- A Passport to Hell (1932) as Baron von Sydow, Police Commandant
- The Son-Daughter (1932) as Fen Sha
- Before Dawn (1933) as Dr. Paul Cornelius
- Charlie Chan's Greatest Case (1933) as Inspector Charlie Chan
- As Husbands Go (1934) as Hippolitus Lomi
- Mandalay (1934) as Nick
- Charlie Chan's Courage (1934) as Inspector Charlie Chan
- Bulldog Drummond Strikes Back (1934) as Prince Achmed
- Charlie Chan in London (1934) as Inspector Charlie Chan
- The Painted Veil (1934) as General Yu
- Charlie Chan in Paris (1935) as Inspector Charlie Chan
- Werewolf of London (1935) as Dr. Yogami
- Charlie Chan in Egypt (1935) as Inspector Charlie Chan
- Shanghai (1935) as Ambassador Lun Sing
- Charlie Chan in Shanghai (1935) as Inspector Charlie Chan
- Charlie Chan's Secret (1936) as Inspector Charlie Chan
- Charlie Chan at the Circus (1936) as Inspector Charlie Chan
- Charlie Chan at the Race Track (1936) as Inspector Charlie Chan
- Charlie Chan at the Opera (1936) as Inspector Charlie Chan
- Charlie Chan at the Olympics (1937) as Inspector Charlie Chan
- Charlie Chan on Broadway (1937) as Inspector Charlie Chan
- Charlie Chan at Monte Carlo (1937) as Inspector Charlie Chan

== Other sources ==
- Alistair, Rupert (2018). "Warner Oland". The Name Below the Title : 65 Classic Movie Character Actors from Hollywood's Golden Age (softcover) (First ed.). Great Britain: Independently published. pp. 196–199. ISBN 978-1-7200-3837-5.
- Katchmer, George A. (1991). Eighty Silent Film Stars: Biographies and Filmographies of the Obscure to the Well Known (hardcover) (First ed.). Jefferson, NC, and London: McFarland. ISBN 978-0-89950-494-0.
- Huang, Yunte (2010) Charlie Chan: The Untold Story of the Honorable Detective and His Rendezvous with American History (New York: W W Norton) ISBN 978-0-393-06962-4
