= Earl Derr Biggers =

American novelist and playwright

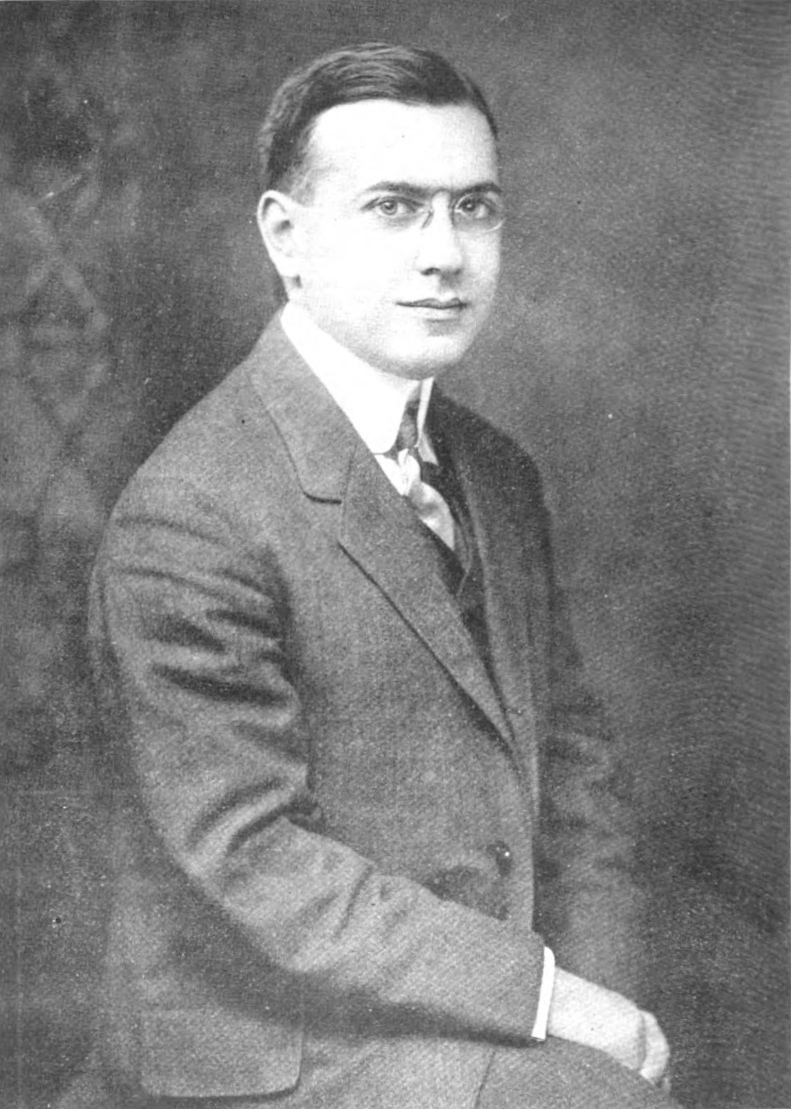
- Born: August 26, 1884; Warren, Ohio, U.S.
- Died: April 5, 1933 (aged 48); Pasadena, California, U.S.
- Education: Harvard University
- Occupations: Playwright, novelist
- Spouse: Eleanor Ladd (m. 1914)
- Children: 1 (Robert)
- Writing career
- Genres: Fiction, theatre
- Notable work: Charlie Chan series

Earl Derr Biggers (August 26, 1884 – April 5, 1933) was an American novelist and playwright. His novels featuring the fictional Chinese American detective Charlie Chan (starting with The House Without a Key in 1925) were adapted into popular films made in the United States and China.

== Biography ==
The son of Robert J. and Emma E. (Derr) Biggers, Earl Derr Biggers was born in Warren, Ohio, and graduated from Harvard University in 1907, where he was a member of The Lampoon. He worked briefly as a journalist for The Plain Dealer in 1907, and then for the Boston Traveller until 1912, before turning to fiction. Many of his plays and novels were made into movies.

His first novel, Seven Keys to Baldpate, was published in 1913, and George M. Cohan quickly adapted the novel as a hit Broadway stage play of the same name. Cohan starred in the 1917 film version, one of seven film versions of the play, and a 1935 revival. The novel was also adapted into two films with different titles, House of the Long Shadows and Haunted Honeymoon, but they had essentially equivalent plots.

On the day that his first novel was accepted for publication, Biggers proposed to Eleanor Ladd, his girlfriend and fellow writer at the Boston Traveller, and they married in 1914; one year later, his son Robert was born.

A decade later, Biggers had even greater success with his series of Charlie Chan detective novels. The popularity of Charlie Chan extended even to China, where audiences in Shanghai appreciated the Hollywood films. Chinese companies made films starring this fictional character. Derr Biggers publicly acknowledged the real-life detective Chang Apana as the inspiration for the character of Charlie Chan in his letter to the Honolulu Advertiser of June 28, 1932. (The letter was published in the 11 September 1932 issue of the Advertiser.)

Biggers lived in San Marino, California, and died in a Pasadena, California hospital after suffering a heart attack in Palm Springs, California. He was 48.

== The Charlie Chan series ==
- The House Without a Key (1925)
- The Chinese Parrot (1926)
- Behind That Curtain (1928)
- The Black Camel (1929)
- Charlie Chan Carries On (1930)
- Keeper of the Keys (1932)

== Other works ==
- Seven Keys to Baldpate (1913)
- Love Insurance (1914); film version: One Night in the Tropics (1940)
- Inside the Lines (1915) (with Robert Welles Ritchie)
- The Agony Column (1916) (also published as Second Floor Mystery)
- Fifty Candles (1921)
- Earl Derr Biggers Tells Ten Stories (short stories, 1933)
