= Reginald Hazeltine Bassett =

American composer and orchestrator

- Born: Bernard Hazeltine Bassett; September 3, 1878; Oakland, California
- Died: April 24, 1951 (aged 73); Los Angeles, California
- Other names: Rex Bassett, R.H. Bassett, R. Bassett
- Occupations: Film composer, arranger, orchestrator
- Years active: 1908–1943
- Spouse: Alyse Lourdes Hunt 1905–1906 (divorce) Rosina E. McIntosh 1912–1916 (divorce) Estelle Carlton Day 1927–1951 (death)

Reginald Hazeltine Bassett (September 3, 1878 – April 24, 1951) was an American composer and orchestrator who led a prolific career in film. He contributed music to over one hundred major movies from the 1920s to the 1940s. He is virtually unknown because he worked under a film studio system that not only controlled the copyrights to his music but also allowed others to take screen credit for his work.

Bassett worked collaboratively on film score compositions with other Hollywood composers from Ira Gershwin to Hugo Friedhofer:

In any event, Friedhofer talks at length about Bassett in his oral history, mentioning the scores on which he worked with him (including Intermezzo and Gone With the Wind) and Bassett's association with Forbstein's predecessor at Warner Bros., Lou Silvers.

== Extant filmography ==
Selected filmography
Year	Film	Director	Role	Production company	Notes
1926	The Volga Boatman	Cecil B. DeMille	Composer	Producers Distributing Corporation	Uncredited
1926	Bardelys the Magnificent	King Vidor	Composer	Metro-Goldwyn-Mayer	Uncredited
1926	What Price Glory?	Raoul Walsh	Composer	Fox Film Corporation	Uncredited
1927	7th Heaven	Frank Borzage	Composer	William Fox Studio	Uncredited
1927	The Loves of Carmen	Raoul Walsh	Composer	Fox Film Corporation	Uncredited
1927	The Devil Dancer	Fred Niblo	Composer	Samuel Goldwyn Productions	Uncredited
1927	Sunrise: A Song of Two Humans	F. W. Murnau	Composer	William Fox Studio	Uncredited
1928	Fazil	Howard Hawks	Composer	Fox Film Corporation	Uncredited
1930	Men Without Women	John Ford	Composer ac	Fox Film Corporation	Uncredited
1930	High Society Blues	David Butler	Composer ac	Fox Film Corporation	Uncredited
1930	The Second Floor Mystery	Roy Del Ruth	Composer mt	Warner Bros.	Uncredited
1930	The Arizona Kid	Alfred Santell	Composer ac	Fox Film Corporation	Uncredited
1930	On the Level	George Melford	Composer ac	Paramount Pictures	Uncredited
1930	Rough Romance	A.F. Erickson	Composer w/ P. Brunelli & A. Kay	Fox Film Corporation	Uncredited
1930	Good Intentions	William K. Howard	Composer ac	Fox Film Corporation	Uncredited
1930	One Mad Kiss	Marcel Silver, James Tinling	Composer w/ P. Brunelli	Fox Film Corporation	Uncredited
1930	Man Trouble	Berthold Viertel	Composer ac	Fox Film Corporation	Uncredited
1930	The Sea Wolf	Alfred Santell	Composer ac	Fox Film Corporation	Uncredited
1930	Liliom	Frank Borzage	Composer ac	Fox Film Corporation	Uncredited
1930	The Big Trail	Raoul Walsh	Composer ac	Fox Film Corporation	Uncredited
1930	Scotland Yard	William K. Howard	Composer ac	Fox Film Corporation	Uncredited
1930	Renegades	Victor Fleming	Composer ac	Fox Film Corporation	Uncredited
1930	Just Imagine	David Butler	Composer ac	Fox Film Corporation	Uncredited
1930	Part Time Wife	Leo McCarey	Composer w/ P. Brunelli	Fox Film Corporation	Uncredited
1931	The Man Who Came Back	Raoul Walsh	Composer mt&ac	Fox Film Corporation	Uncredited
1931	Men on Call	John G. Blystone	Composer ac	Fox Film Corporation	Uncredited
1931	East Lynne	Frank Lloyd	Composer mt, w/P. Brunelli	Fox Film Corporation	Uncredited
1931	Three Girls Lost	Sidney Lanfield	Composer mt	Fox Film Corporation	Uncredited
1931	Women of All Nations	Raoul Walsh	Composer ac	Fox Film Corporation	Uncredited
1931	Goldie	Benjamin Stoloff	Composer mt w/H. Friedhofer	Fox Film Corporation	Uncredited
1931	Hush Money	Sidney Lanfield	Composer mt	Fox Film Corporation	Uncredited
1931	Transatlantic	William K. Howard	Composer mt w/H. Friedhofer	Fox Film Corporation	Uncredited
1931	The Spider	William Cameron Menzies	Composer mt w/G. Knight	Fox Film Corporation	Uncredited
1931	Wicked	Allan Dwan	Composer mt	Fox Film Corporation	Uncredited
1931	Riders of the Purple Sage	Hamilton MacFadden	Composer ac	Fox Film Corporation	Uncredited
1931	The Yellow Ticket	Raoul Walsh	Composer mt	Fox Film Corporation	Uncredited
1931	Surrender	William K. Howard	Composer mt	Fox Film Corporation	Uncredited
1931	Good Sport	Kenneth MacKenna	Composer	Fox Film Corporation	Uncredited
1932	The Rainbow Trail	David Howard	Composer mt	Fox Film Corporation	Uncredited
1932	Stepping Sisters	Seymour Felix	Composer	Fox Film Corporation	Uncredited
1932	The Gay Caballero	Alfred L. Werker	Composer	Fox Film Corporation	Uncredited
1932	The Trial of Vivienne Ware	William K. Howard	Composer mt	Fox Film Corporation	Uncredited
1932	While Paris Sleeps	Allan Dwan	Composer ac	Fox Film Corporation	Uncredited
1932	Week Ends Only	Alan Crosland	Composer ac	Fox Film Corporation	Uncredited
1932	Bachelor's Affairs	Alfred L. Werker	Composer w/P. Brunelli	Fox Film Corporation	Uncredited
1932	Almost Married	William Cameron Menzies	Composer mt	Fox Film Corporation	Uncredited
1932	A Passport to Hell	Frank Lloyd	Composer w/H. Friedhofer & A. Lange	Fox Film Corporation	Uncredited
1932	Chandu the Magician	William Cameron Menzies	Composer w/P. Brunelli & L. DeFrancisco	Fox Film Corporation	Uncredited
1932	Wild Girl	Raoul Walsh	Composer ac	Fox Film Corporation	Uncredited
1932	Six Hours to Live	William Dieterle	Composer w/P. Brunelli	Fox Film Corporation	Uncredited
1932	Sherlock Holmes	William K. Howard	Composer w/H. Friedhofer	Fox Film Corporation	Uncredited
1932	El Caballero de la Noche	James Tinling	Composer w/ P. Brunelli & H. Friedhofer	Fox Film Corporation	Uncredited
1932	Tess of the Storm Country	Alfred Santell	Composer ac	Fox Film Corporation	Uncredited
1932	Handle with Care	David Butler	Composer w/ P. Brunelli	Fox Film Corporation	Uncredited
1933	Robber's Roost	David Howard & Louis King	Composer mt	Fox Film Corporation	Uncredited
1933	Face in the Sky	Harry Lachman	Composer w/ P. Brunelli	Fox Film Corporation	Uncredited
1933	Dangerously Yours	Frank Tuttle	Composer w/L. DeFrancisco	Fox Film Corporation	Uncredited
1933	Trick for Trick	Hamilton MacFadden	Composer	Fox Film Corporation	Uncredited
1933	Zoo in Budapest	Rowland V. Lee	Composer ac	Fox Film Corporation	Uncredited
1933	The Warrior's Husband	Walter Lang	Composer	Fox Film Corporation	Uncredited
1933	Hold Me Tight	David Butler	Composer	Fox Film Corporation	Uncredited
1933	Best of Enemies	Rian James	Composer w/ A. Lange	Fox Film Corporation	Uncredited
1933	It's Great to Be Alive	Alfred L. Werker	Composer ac	Fox Film Corporation	Uncredited
1933	Shanghai Madness	John G. Blystone	Composer w/ J. Zamecnik & L. DeFrancesco	Fox Film Corporation	Uncredited
1933	Pilgrimage	John Ford	Composer	Fox Film Corporation	Uncredited
1933	Deluge	Felix E. Feist	Composer	K.B.S. Productions	Uncredited
1933	Paddy the Next Best Thing	Harry Lachman	Composer ac	Fox Film Corporation	Uncredited
1934	La Ciudad de Carton	Louis King	Composer ac	Fox Film Corporation	Uncredited
1934	No Greater Glory	Frank Borzage	Composer	Columbia Pictures	Uncredited
1934	Whom the Gods Destroy	Walter Lang	Composer	Columbia Pictures	Uncredited
1934	The World Moves On	John Ford	Composer w/L. DeFrancisco	Fox Film Corporation	Uncredited
1934	Have a Heart	David Butler	Composer	Metro-Goldwyn-Mayer	Uncredited
1934	One Night of Love	Victor Schertzinger	pan shot	Columbia Pictures	Uncredited
1934	Student Tour	Charles Reisner	Composer	Metro-Goldwyn-Mayer	Uncredited
1934	Un Capitan de Cosacos	John Reinhardt	Composer ac	Fox Film Corporation	Uncredited
1934	Evelyn Prentice	William K. Howard	Composer	Metro-Goldwyn-Mayer	Uncredited
1934	The Gay Bride	Jack Conway	Composer	Metro-Goldwyn-Mayer	Uncredited
1934	The Band Plays On	Russell Mack	Composer	Metro-Goldwyn-Mayer	Uncredited
1935	Charlie Chan in Paris	Lewis Seiler & Hamilton MacFadden	Composer	Fox Film Corporation	Uncredited
1935	Society Doctor	George B. Seitz	Composer	Metro-Goldwyn-Mayer	Uncredited
1935	Shadow of Doubt	George B. Seitz	Composer	Metro-Goldwyn-Mayer	Uncredited
1935	One Frightened Night	Christy Cabanne	Composer	Mascot Pictures	Uncredited
1935	Our Little Girl	John S. Robertson	Composer	Fox Film Corporation	Uncredited
1935	David Copperfield	George Cukor	Composer ac	Metro-Goldwyn-Mayer	Uncredited
1935	Charlie Chan in Egypt	Louis King	Composer	Fox Film Corporation	Uncredited
1935	Love Me Forever	Victor Schertzinger	Composer	Columbia Pictures	Uncredited
1935	Mad Love	Karl Freund	Composer mt	Metro-Goldwyn-Mayer	Uncredited
1935	The Black Room	Roy William Neill	Composer	Columbia Pictures	Uncredited
1935	Curly Top	Irving Cummings	Composer	Fox Film Corporation	Uncredited
1935	The Farmer Takes a Wife	Victor Fleming	Composer	Fox Film Corporation	Uncredited
1935	Dante's Inferno	Harry Lachman	Composer	Fox Film Corporation	Uncredited
1935	Crime and Punishment	Josef von Sternberg	Composer	Columbia Pictures	Uncredited
1935	Professional Soldier	Tay Garnett	Composer	20th Century Fox	Uncredited
1936	Tough Guy	Chester Franklin	Composer	Metro-Goldwyn-Mayer	Uncredited
1936	The Prisoner of Shark Island	John Ford	Composer	20th Century Fox	Uncredited
1936	The Country Doctor	Henry King	Composer	20th Century Fox	Uncredited
1936	The Country Beyond	Eugene Forde	Composer	20th Century Fox	Uncredited
1936	Dimples	William A. Seiter	Composer	20th Century Fox	Uncredited
1936	Craig's Wife	Dorothy Arzner	Composer	Columbia Pictures	Uncredited
1936	The Man Who Lived Twice	Harry Lachman	Composer	Columbia Pictures	Uncredited
1936	Sins of Man	Otto Brower	Composer	20th Century Fox	Uncredited
1936	The Road to Glory	Howard Hawks	Composer	20th Century Fox	Uncredited
1936	Lloyd's of London	Henry King	Composer	20th Century Fox	Uncredited
1937	Think Fast, Mr. Moto	Norman Foster	Composer	20th Century Fox	Uncredited
1938	International Settlement	Eugene Forde	Composer	20th Century Fox	Uncredited
1939	Stanley and Livingstone	Henry King	Composer	20th Century Fox	Uncredited
1939	Susannah of the Mounties	Walter Lang	Composer	20th Century Fox	Uncredited
1941	Western Union	Fritz Lang	Composer	20th Century Fox	Uncredited

== Music department ==
1. Delicious (1931) (orchestrator) (uncredited)
2. Igloo (1932) (composer: stock music) (uncredited)
3. Bird of Paradise (1932) (orchestrator) (uncredited)
4. My Lips Betray (1933) (orchestrator) (uncredited)
5. Flying Down to Rio (1933) (music arranger) (uncredited)
6. Midnight (1934) (composer: stock music) (uncredited); aka Call It Murder (USA: reissue title)
7. Chained (1934) (orchestrator) (uncredited)
8. Sequoia (1934) (orchestrator) (uncredited)... aka Malibu
9. The Personal History, Adventures, Experience, & Observation of David Copperfield the Younger (1935) (composer: additional music) (uncredited) (orchestrator) (uncredited); aka David Copperfield (USA: short title)
10. The Night Is Young (1935) (orchestrator) (uncredited)
11. Charlie Chan in Paris (1935) (composer: stock music) (uncredited)
12. The Casino Murder Case (1935) (orchestrator) (uncredited)
13. Baby Face Harrington (1935) (orchestrator) (uncredited)
14. Uncivil Warriors (1935) (composer: stock music) (uncredited)
15. One Frightened Night (1935) (composer: stock music) (uncredited)
16. Charlie Chan in Egypt (1935) (composer: stock music) (uncredited)
17. Mad Love (1935) (composer: title music) (uncredited); aka The Hands of Orlac (UK)
18. Undersea Kingdom (1936) (composer: stock music) (uncredited)
19. Adventure in Manhattan (1936) (composer: stock music) (uncredited); aka Manhattan Madness (UK)
20. The Garden of Allah (1936) (orchestrator) (uncredited)
21. The Charge of the Light Brigade (1936) (orchestrator) (uncredited)
22. Legion of Terror (1936) (composer: stock music) (uncredited)
23. Theodora Goes Wild (1936) (composer: stock music) (uncredited)
24. Stampede (1936) (composer: stock music) (uncredited)
25. Two-Fisted Sheriff (1937) (composer: stock music) (uncredited)
26. S.O.S. Coast Guard (1937) (composer: stock music) (uncredited)
27. The Secret of Treasure Island (1938) (composer: stock music) (uncredited); aka The Secret of a Treasure Island (USA: poster title)
28. The Adventures of Robin Hood (1938) (orchestrator) (uncredited); aka Robin Hood (Australia: TV title)
29. City Streets (1938) (composer: stock music) (uncredited)
30. The Man They Could Not Hang (1939) (composer: stock music) (uncredited)
31. Intermezzo: A Love Story (1939) (orchestrator) (uncredited); aka Escape to Happiness (UK); aka Intermezzo (USA: short title)
32. Mr. Smith Goes to Washington (1939) (composer: stock music) (uncredited); aka Frank Capra's Mr. Smith Goes to Washington (USA: complete title)
33. Gone with the Wind (1939) (orchestrator) (uncredited)
34. The Yearling (1946) (orchestrator) (uncredited)
35. Batman and Robin (1949) (composer: stock music) (uncredited); aka The Adventures of Batman and Robin; aka The New Adventures of Batman and Robin
36. Beyond the Purple Hills (it) (1950) (composer: stock music) (uncredited)
37. The Big Gusher (1951) (composer: stock music) (uncredited)
38. The Rough, Tough West (1952) (composer: stock music) (uncredited)
39. Saginaw Trail (1953) (composer: stock music) (uncredited)

== Family ==
Reginald Hazeltine Bassett was born September 3, 1878, in Oakland, California, to the marriage of James Madison Bassett (1830–1903) and Carrie Hazeltine (maiden; 1958–1943). He was married three times.

1. Bassett first married on January 22, 1905, in Monterey, California, to Alyse Lourdes Hunt (maiden; 1880–1969), her first of four marriages. They divorced July 25, 1906, in San Francisco.
2. Bassett married again on April 19, 1912, in Oakland, California, to Rosina E. McIntosh (maiden; 1891—1973), her first of two marriages. They divorced in 1916 in San Francisco.
3. Bassett then married on July 25, 1927, in Santa Ana, California, to Estelle Carlton Day (maiden; 1885–1951), her third marriage. Estelle predeceased Reginald by eighty-two days.
