= The Rainbow Trail (1932 film) =

1932 Pre-Code Western film

- Directed by: David Howard
- Screenplay by: Barry Conners; Philip Klein
- Based on: The Rainbow Trail by Zane Grey
- Produced by: Edmund Grainger
- Starring: George O'Brien; Cecilia Parker
- Cinematography: Daniel B. Clark
- Edited by: Alfred DeGaetano
- Music by: R.H. Bassett (uncredited); Peter Brunelli (uncredited)
- Production company: Fox Film Corporation
- Release date: January 3, 1932
- Running time: 65 minutes
- Country: United States
- Language: English

The Rainbow Trail is a 1932 Pre-Code Western film directed by David Howard and starring George O'Brien. The picture is an adaptation of Zane Grey's novel of the same name and a sequel to the 1931 film Riders of the Purple Sage, which also stars O'Brien.

The Rainbow Trail had previously been filmed as a silent version in 1918 with William Farnum, and as a sound version in 1925 with Tom Mix.

== Cast ==
- George O'Brien as Shefford
- Cecilia Parker as Fay Larkin
- Minna Gombell as Ruth
- Roscoe Ates as Ike Wilkins
- J. M. Kerrigan as Paddy Harrigan
- James Kirkwood as Venters
- W. L. Thorne as Dyer
- Robert Frazer as Lone Eagle
- Ruth Donnelly as Abigail
- Niles Welch as Willets
- Landers Stevens as Presby
- Laska Winter as Singing Cloud
- Edward Hearn as Jim Lassiter
- Alice Ward as Jane Withersteen
- George Burton as Elliott
- Iron Eyes Cody as Indian

== Critical reception ==
Variety commented, "Above average production and some outdoor photography that's enthralling don't quite lift it into deluxe booking eligibility." They wrote that O'Brien "gives a good interpretation of the role", and referencing the previous versions, wrote that O'Brien resembles William Farnum more than Tom Mix, but plays the character with "power" rather than with Mix's "action" style.

The Film Daily praised the "picturesque" exterior locations but stated the "story lacks logic and there is insufficient action."
