= Joyce Compton =

American actress (1907–1997)

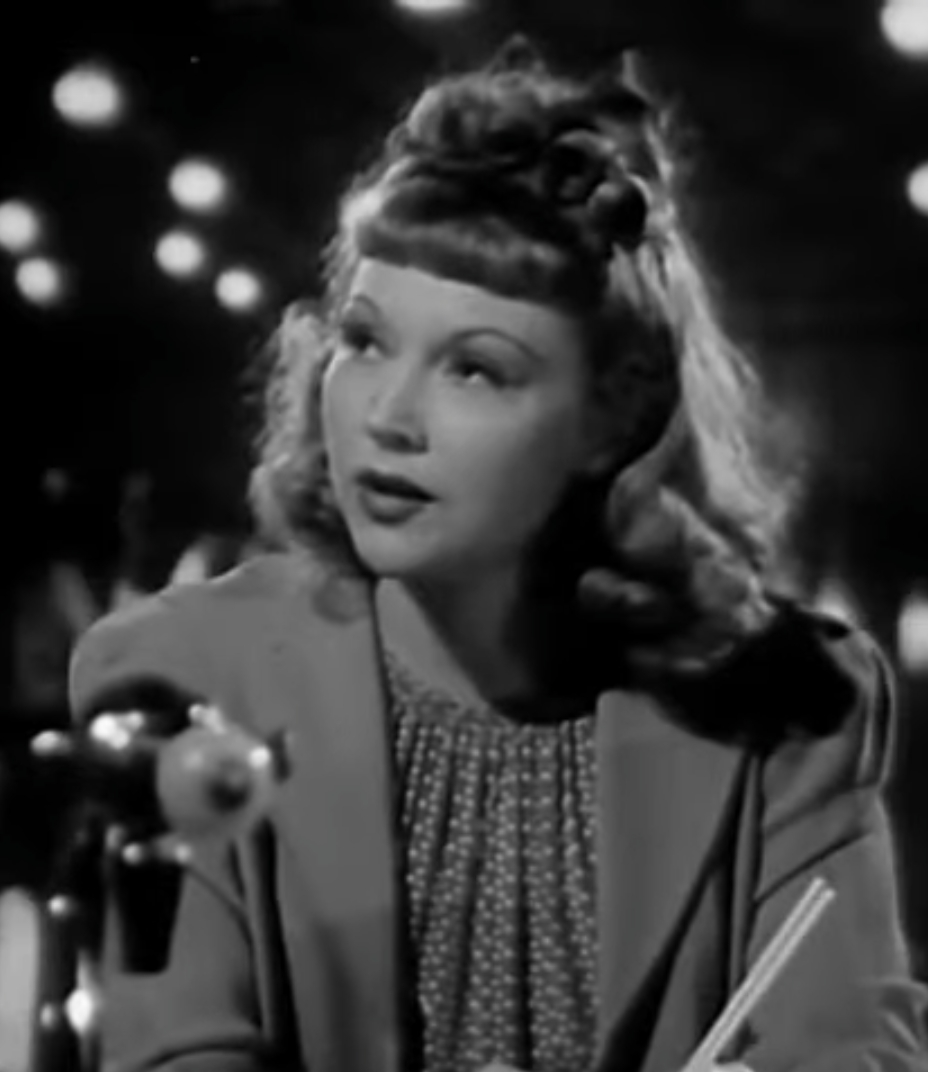
- Compton in I Take This Oath (1940)
- Born: Olivia Joyce Compton; January 27, 1907; Lexington, Kentucky, U.S.
- Died: October 13, 1997 (aged 90); Los Angeles, California, U.S.
- Resting place: Forest Lawn Memorial Park, Hollywood Hills
- Occupation: Actress
- Years active: 1925–1961
- Spouse: William Francis Kaliher (m. 1955; div. 1956)

Olivia Joyce Compton (January 27, 1907 – October 13, 1997) was an American actress.

== Biography ==
Compton was born in Lexington, Kentucky, the daughter of Henry and Golden Compton. Despite frequent reports to the contrary, her name was not originally "Eleanor Hunt"; she had appeared in the film Good Sport (1931) with Hunt and this confusion in an early press article followed Compton throughout her career. After graduating high school she spent two years at the University of Tulsa, studying dramatics, art, music and dancing. She won a personality and beauty contest and spent two months in a film studio as an extra.

Compton first made a name for herself when she was named one of the WAMPAS Baby Stars in 1926 with Mary Brian, Dolores Costello, Joan Crawford, Dolores del Río, Janet Gaynor and Fay Wray. Compton appeared in a long string of mostly B-movies from the 1920s through the 1950s. She was a comedy actress and protested at being stereotyped as a "dumb blonde".

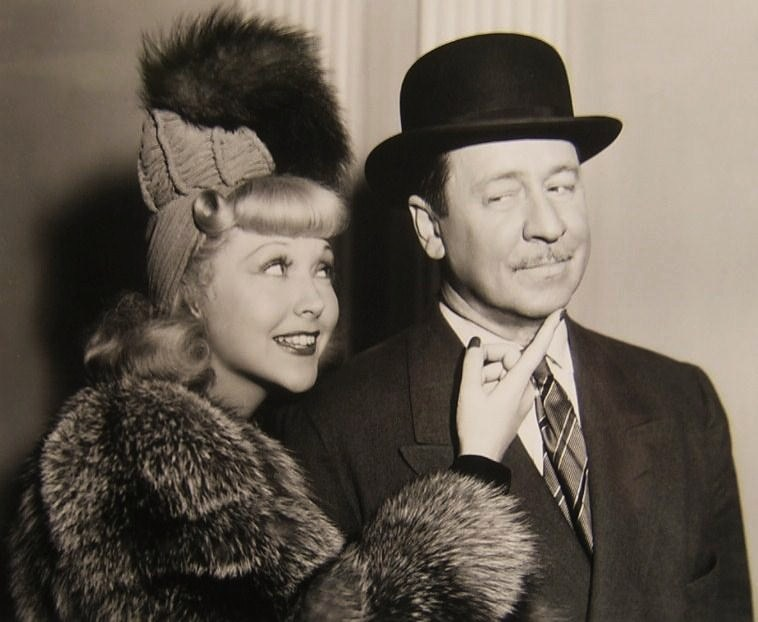
Compton and Robert Benchley in Bedtime Story

Among her over 200 films were Imitation of Life, Magnificent Obsession, Christmas in Connecticut, The Awful Truth, Mildred Pierce, and The Best Years of Our Lives.

A devout Christian, on her gravestone, just beneath her dates of birth and death, is written "Christian Actress". She died from natural causes, aged 90, and was buried in Forest Lawn Memorial Park in the Hollywood Hills.

== Awards ==
For her contributions to the motion picture industry, Compton was awarded a star on the Hollywood Walk of Fame on the south side of the 7000 block of Hollywood Boulevard.

== Selected filmography ==
- The Golden Bed (1925) as Minor Role (uncredited)
- Sally (1925) as Minor Role (uncredited)
- What Fools Men (1925) as Dorothy
- Broadway Lady (1925) as Phyllis Westbrook
- Syncopating Sue (1926) as Marge Adams
- Ankles Preferred (1927) as Virginia
- The Border Cavalier (1927) as Madge Lawton
- Soft Living (1928) as Billie Wilson
- The Wild Party (1929) as Eva Tutt
- Dangerous Curves (1929) as Jennie Silver
- Salute (1929) as Marian Wilson
- The Sky Hawk (1929) as Peggy
- High Society Blues (1930) as Pearl Granger
- The Three Sisters (1930) as Carlotta
- Cheer Up and Smile (1930) as College Co-Ed (uncredited)
- Wild Company (1930) as Anita Grayson
- Lightnin' (1930) as Betty - Larry's Wife
- Not Exactly Gentlemen (1931) as Ace's Girl
- Three Girls Lost (1931) as Edna Best
- Up Pops the Devil (1931) as Luella May Carroll
- Women of All Nations (1931) as Kiki (uncredited)
- Annabelle's Affairs (1931) as Mabel
- The Spider (1931) as Butch's Girl Friend (uncredited)
- Good Sport (1931) as Fay
- Under Eighteen (1931) as Sybil
- Lena Rivers (1932) as Caroline Nichols
- Westward Passage (1932) as Lillie (uncredited)
- Unholy Love (1932) as Sheilla Bailey Gregory
- Beauty Parlor (1932) as Joan Perry
- Lady and Gent (1932) as Betty
- Fighting for Justice (1932) as Amy Tracy
- A Parisian Romance (1932) as Marcelle
- Hat Check Girl (1932) as A Party Guest (uncredited)
- False Faces (1932) as Dottie Nation
- Madison Square Garden (1932) as Joyce
- Afraid to Talk (1932) as Alice - Party Girl
- If I Had a Million (1932) as Marie - Waitress (uncredited)
- Luxury Liner (1933) as Girl Overboard (uncredited)
- Sing, Sinner, Sing (1933) as Gwen
- Only Yesterday (1933) as Margot (uncredited)
- Dream Stuff (1934, Short)
- Caravan (1934) as Party Girl at Beer Garden (uncredited)
- The Trumpet Blows (1934) as Blonde on Train (uncredited)
- Affairs of a Gentleman (1934) as Foxey Dennison
- Million Dollar Ransom (1934) as Millie - Hat Check Girl (uncredited)
- King Kelly of the U.S.A. (1934) as Maxine Latour
- Imitation of Life (1934) as Young Woman at Party (uncredited)
- The White Parade (1934) as Una Mellon
- Rustlers of Red Dog (1935, Serial) as Mary Lee
- Go into Your Dance (1935) as Café Showgirl
- Mister Dynamite (1935) as Check Room Girl (uncredited)
- Let 'Em Have It (1935) as Barbara
- College Scandal (1935) as Toby Carpenter
- Suicide Squad (1935) as Mary
- Magnificent Obsession (1935, unbilled) as Nurse (uncredited)
- Valley of the Lawless (1936) as Joan Jenkins
- Love Before Breakfast (1936) as Mary Lee
- The Harvester (1936) as Thelma Biddle
- Trapped by Television (1936) as Mae Collins
- Star for a Night (1936) as Ellen Romaine
- Sitting on the Moon (1936) as Blossom
- Murder with Pictures (1936) as Hester Boone
- Ellis Island (1936) as Adele
- Under Your Spell (1936) as Secretary (uncredited)
- Country Gentlemen (1936) as Gertie
- Three Smart Girls (1936) as Judson's Secretary (uncredited)
- The Awful Truth (1937) as Dixie Belle Lee
- China Passage (1937) as Elaine Gentry - Customs Agent aka Mrs. Katharine 'Kate' Collins
- Top of the Town (1937) as Beulah (uncredited)
- We Have Our Moments (1937) as Carrie
- Wings Over Honolulu (1937) as Caroline
- Pick a Star (1937) as Newlywed
- Kid Galahad (1937) as Party Guest on Phone (uncredited)
- Rhythm in the Clouds (1937) as Amy Lou
- Born Reckless (1937) as Dora - at the Race Track (uncredited)
- The Toast of New York (1937) as Mary Lou (uncredited)
- Sea Racketeers (1937) as Blondie
- She Asked for It (1937) as Miss Hurley (uncredited)
- Small Town Boy (1937) as Molly Summers
- Wings Over Honolulu (1937) as Dixie Belle Lee
- Man-Proof (1938) as Guest (uncredited)
- Love on a Budget (1938) as Millie Brown
- Women Are Like That (1938) as Miss Hall
- You and Me (1938) as Curly Blonde
- Spring Madness (1938) as Sally Prescott
- The Last Warning (1938) as Dawn Day aka Minnie Schultz
- Artists and Models Abroad (1938) as 'Chickie'
- Trade Winds (1938) as Mrs. Johnson
- Going Places (1938) as Joan
- The Flying Irishman (1939) as Sally - a Waitress (uncredited)
- Rose of Washington Square (1939) as Peggy
- Hotel for Women (1939) as Emeline Thomas
- Reno (1939) as Bonnie Newcomb
- Balalaika (1939) as Masha (Lydia's maid)
- Escape to Paradise (1939) as Penelope Carter
- Honeymoon Deferred (1940) as Kitty Kerry
- Turnabout (1940) as Irene Clare
- I Take This Oath (1940) as Betty Casey
- They Drive by Night (1940) as Sue Carter (uncredited)
- City for Conquest (1940) as Lilly
- Sky Murder (1940) as Christine Cross
- The Villain Still Pursued Her (1940) as Hazel Dalton
- Who Killed Aunt Maggie? (1940) as Cynthia Lou
- Let's Make Music (1941) as Betty
- Ziegfeld Girl (1941) as Miss Sawyer - Auditioning Showgirl (uncredited)
- Manpower (1941) as Scarlett
- Scattergood Meets Broadway (1941, aka Blonde Menace) as Diana Deane
- Moon Over Her Shoulder (1941) as Cecilia
- Blues in the Night (1941) as Blonde
- Bedtime Story (1941) as Beulah
- Too Many Women (1942) as Barbara Cartwright
- Thunder Birds (1942) as Saleswoman
- Silver Skates (1943) as Lucille
- A Gentle Gangster (1943) as Kitty Parker
- Let's Face It (1943) as Wiggin's Girl (uncredited)
- Silver Spurs (1943) as Millie Love
- Swing Out the Blues (1943) as Kitty Grogan
- Roughly Speaking (1945) as Prissy Girl (uncredited)
- Pillow to Post (1945) as Gertrude Wilson (uncredited)
- Hitchhike to Happiness (1945) as Joan Randall
- Christmas in Connecticut (1945) as Mary Lee
- Mildred Pierce (1945) as Waitress (uncredited)
- Danger Signal (1945) as Kate
- Dark Alibi (1946) as Emily Evans
- Behind the Mask (1946) as Lulu
- Night and Day (1946) as Chorine (uncredited)
- Rendezvous with Annie (1946) as Louise Grapa
- The Best Years of Our Lives (1946) as Hat Check Girl (uncredited)
- Scared to Death (1947) as Jane Cornell
- Exposed (1947) as Emmy
- Linda, Be Good (1947) as Mrs. LaVitte
- A Southern Yankee (1948) as Hortense Dobson
- Sorry, Wrong Number (1948) as Cotterell's Blonde Girlfriend (uncredited)
- Luxury Liner (1948) (uncredited)
- Incident (1948) as Joan Manning
- Grand Canyon (1949) as Mabel
- Mighty Joe Young (1949) as Alice (uncredited)
- The Persuader (1957) as Julie
- Jet Pilot (1957, made in 1951) as Mrs. Simpson (uncredited)
- Girl in the Woods (1958) as Aunt Martha
- 77 Sunset Strip (1958) Television series. Season 1 episode 7 "All Our Yesterdays" (uncredited)
