= Dante's Inferno (1935 film) =

1935 drama film

- Poster of Dante's Inferno
- Directed by: Harry Lachman
- Written by: Philip Klein; Robert M. Yost
- Produced by: Sol M. Wurtzel
- Starring: Spencer Tracy; Claire Trevor; Rita Hayworth (credited as Rita Cansino)
- Cinematography: Rudolph Maté
- Edited by: Alfred DeGaetano (credited as Al DeGaetano)
- Music by: R.H. Bassett; Samuel Kaylin (music director)
- Color process: Black and white
- Production company: Fox Film Corporation
- Distributed by: 20th Century Fox
- Release date: August 23, 1935
- Running time: 89 minutes
- Country: United States
- Language: English
- Budget: $748,900 (estimate)

Dante's Inferno is a 1935 American drama film starring Spencer Tracy and loosely based on Dante Alighieri's Divine Comedy. The film remains primarily remembered for a 10-minute depiction of hell realized by director Harry Lachman, himself an established Post-Impressionist painter. This was Fox Film Corporation's last film to be produced under the Fox Studios banner before the company merged with Twentieth Century Pictures to form 20th Century-Fox Film Corporation.

== Plot ==
Jim Carter, a former stoker, takes over a fairground show, run by 'Pop' McWade, which depicts scenes from Dante's Inferno. He marries Pop's niece Betty and they have a son, Alexander. Meanwhile, the show becomes a great success, with Carter making it larger and more lurid. An inspector declares the fair unsafe but Carter bribes him into silence. There is a partial collapse at the fair which injures Pop. Recovering in hospital, he admonishes Carter and we see a lengthy vision of the Inferno. Undeterred, Carter establishes a new venture with an unsafe floating casino, only for disaster to strike again at sea.

== Cast ==
- Spencer Tracy as Jim Carter
- Claire Trevor as Betty McWade
- Henry B. Walthall as Pop McWade
- Alan Dinehart as Jonesy
- Scotty Beckett as Alexander Carter
- Rita Hayworth (credited as Rita Cansino) as Dancer
- Willard Robertson as Building Inspector Harris
- Morgan Wallace .l as Chad Williford
- Robert Gleckler as Dean
- Don Ameche as Man in Stoke-Hold (uncredited)
- Jack Mower as Court Bailiff (uncredited)
- George Irving as Judge (uncredited)

This was Spencer Tracy's last film for Fox before moving to MGM.

== Production ==
=== Development ===
The film uses a conventional story of greed and dishonesty to project an image of the Inferno conjured up in Dante's 14th-century epic poem. Director Lachman had established a substantial reputation as a painter before embarking on a Hollywood career and he summoned his artistic vision to realise Dante's work in cinematographic form, drawing on the engravings of Gustave Doré. The film's reputation pivots on the 10 minute vision of the Inferno and reception has been mixed. Leslie Halliwell described it as "one of the most unexpected, imaginative and striking pieces of cinema in Hollywood's history," while Variety held that it was, "a pushover for vigorous exploitation."

=== Release ===
The 1935 film was produced by Fox Film Corporation just before the May 31, 1935 merger that created Twentieth Century-Fox, and so it was released as a Twentieth Century-Fox film.

=== Magnascope ===
In Philadelphia, the red-tinted hell scenes were projected in Magnascope, an early widescreen process.
