= The Gay Caballero (1932 film) =

1932 film

- Directed by: Alfred L. Werker
- Screenplay by: Barry Conners; Philip Klein
- Based on: The Gay Bandit of the Border by Tom Gill
- Produced by: Edmund Grainger
- Starring: George O'Brien; Victor McLaglen; Conchita Montenegro; Linda Watkins; C. Henry Gordon; Weldon Heyburn
- Cinematography: George Schneiderman
- Edited by: Alfred DeGaetano
- Music by: R.H. Bassett
- Production company: Fox Film Corporation
- Distributed by: Fox Film Corporation
- Release date: February 14, 1932
- Running time: 60 minutes
- Country: United States
- Language: English

The Gay Caballero is a 1932 American pre-Code Western film directed by Alfred L. Werker and written by Barry Conners and Philip Klein. The film stars George O'Brien, Victor McLaglen, Conchita Montenegro, Linda Watkins, C. Henry Gordon and Weldon Heyburn. The film's screenplay was adapted from the novel The Gay Bandit of the Border by Tom Gill. The film was released on February 14, 1932, by Fox Film Corporation.

== Cast ==
- George O'Brien as Ted Radcliffe
- Victor McLaglen as Don Bob Harkness/"El Coyote"
- Conchita Montenegro as Adela O'Brien Morales
- Linda Watkins as Ann Grey
- C. Henry Gordon as Don Paco Morales
- Weldon Heyburn as Jito
- Martin Garralaga as Manuel
- Willard Robertson as Maj. Lawrence Blount
- Juan Torena as Juan Rodrigues
- Al Ernest Garcia as Bandit

== Critical Response ==
International Photographer praised the film's "colorful" settings but "George O'Brien lacks the conviction he usually imparts to his work" and that Watkins and Montenegro were wasted in roles that did not give "any particular incentive to enthusiasm."
