= We Have Our Moments =

1937 film by Alfred L. Werker

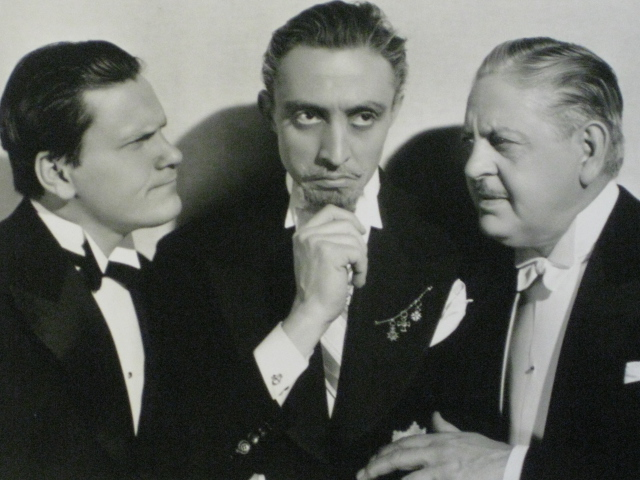
- Warren Hymer, Mischa Auer, and Thurston Hall in We Have Our Moments
- Directed by: Alfred L. Werker
- Written by: Charles Belden; Charles Grayson; Bruce Manning; Frederick Stephani
- Produced by: Edmund Grainger; Charles R. Rogers
- Starring: Sally Eilers; James Dunn; Mischa Auer
- Cinematography: Milton R. Krasner
- Edited by: Frank Gross
- Music by: Charles Henderson
- Production company: Universal Pictures
- Distributed by: Universal Pictures
- Release date: March 29, 1937
- Running time: 65 minutes
- Country: United States
- Language: English

We Have Our Moments is a 1937 American comedy mystery film directed by Alfred L. Werker and starring Sally Eilers, James Dunn, and Mischa Auer.

== Cast ==
- Sally Eilers as Mary Smith
- James Dunn as John Wade
- Mischa Auer as Capt. Enrico Mussetti
- Thurston Hall as Frank Rutherford
- David Niven as Joe Gilling
- Warren Hymer as Smacksey
- Marjorie Gateson as Mrs. Rutherford
- Grady Sutton as Clem Porter
- Joyce Compton as Carrie
- Alyce Ardell as Stewardess
- Margaret Armstrong as Mother
- Ray Brown as The Captain
- Tommy Bupp as Child
- Robert Cauterio as Customs Inspector
- Jack Chefe as Croupier
- Adrienne D'Ambricourt as Maid
- George Davis as Waiter
- J. Gunnis Davis as Waiter
- Dot Farley
- Don Hulbert as Child
- Olaf Hytten as Steward
- Jerry Larkin as Assistant Purser
- Alphonse Martell as Headwaiter
- Robert McKenzie as Taxi Driver
- Margaret McWade as Woman in Stateroom
- Franklin Pangborn as Joe the Bartender
- Albert Petit as Customs Inspector
- Frank Puglia as Customs Inspector
- Virginia Sale as Miss Koltz
- Pietro Sosso as Customs Inspector
- John M. Sullivan as Bank Manager
- Martin Turner as Porter
- Delmar Watson as Little B

== Bibliography ==
- Fowler, Karin J. David Niven: A Bio-bibliography. Greenwood Publishing Group, 1995.
