= Ankles Preferred =

1927 film by John G. Blystone

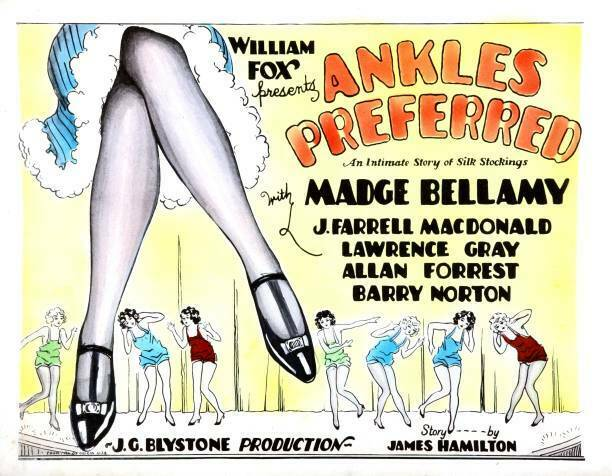
- Lobby card
- Directed by: John G. Blystone
- Screenplay by: James Shelley Hamilton
- Story by: John G. Blystone; Kenneth Hawks; Philip Klein
- Starring: Madge Bellamy; Lawrence Gray; Barry Norton; Allan Forrest; Marjorie Beebe; Joyce Compton
- Cinematography: Glen MacWilliams
- Production company: Fox Film Corporation
- Distributed by: Fox Film Corporation
- Release date: February 27, 1927
- Running time: 60 minutes
- Country: United States
- Language: Silent (English intertitles)

Ankles Preferred is a 1927 American silent comedy film directed by John G. Blystone and written by James Shelley Hamilton. The film stars Madge Bellamy, Lawrence Gray, Barry Norton, Allan Forrest, Marjorie Beebe and Joyce Compton. The film was released on February 27, 1927, by Fox Film Corporation.

== Cast ==
- Madge Bellamy as Nora
- Lawrence Gray as Barney
- Barry Norton as Jimmy
- Allan Forrest as Hornsbee
- Marjorie Beebe as Flo
- Joyce Compton as Virginia
- Lillian Elliott as Mrs. Goldberg
- Mary Foy as Mrs. McGuire
- J. Farrell MacDonald as McGuire
- William H. Strauss as Mr. Goldberg

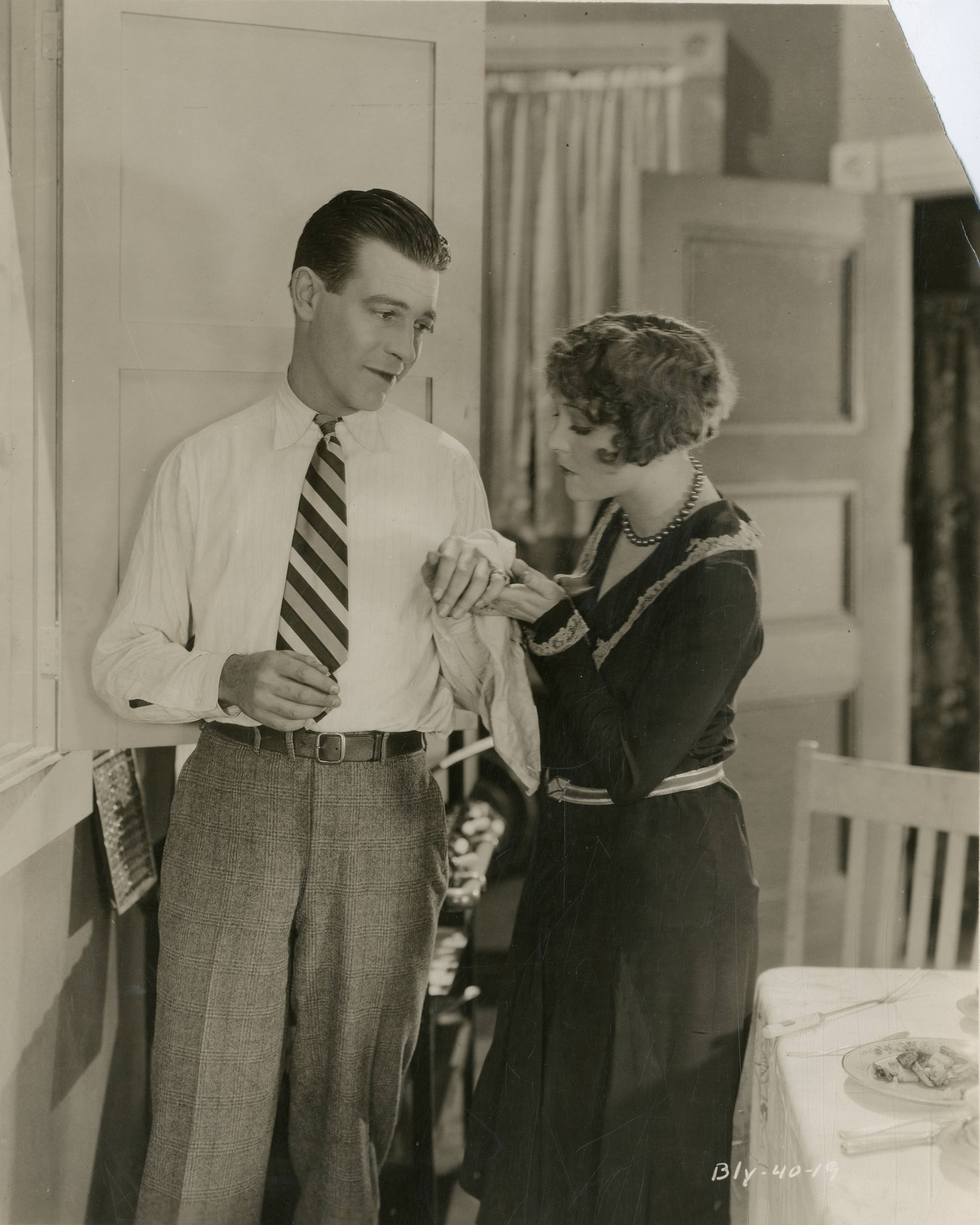
Film still with Bellamy and Gray

== Preservation ==
A print of Ankles Preferred is located in the collection of the Museum Of Modern Art.
