= Hot Pepper =

Hot Pepper may refer to:

- Hot Pepper (1933 film) directed by John G. Blystone
- Hot Pepper (1973 film) by Les Blank
- Chili pepper, fruits of plants of the genus Capsicum
