= Too Busy to Work =

Too Busy to Work may refer to:

- Too Busy to Work (1932 film), an American drama film
- Too Busy to Work (1939 film), an American comedy film
