= Hat Check Girl =

1932 film

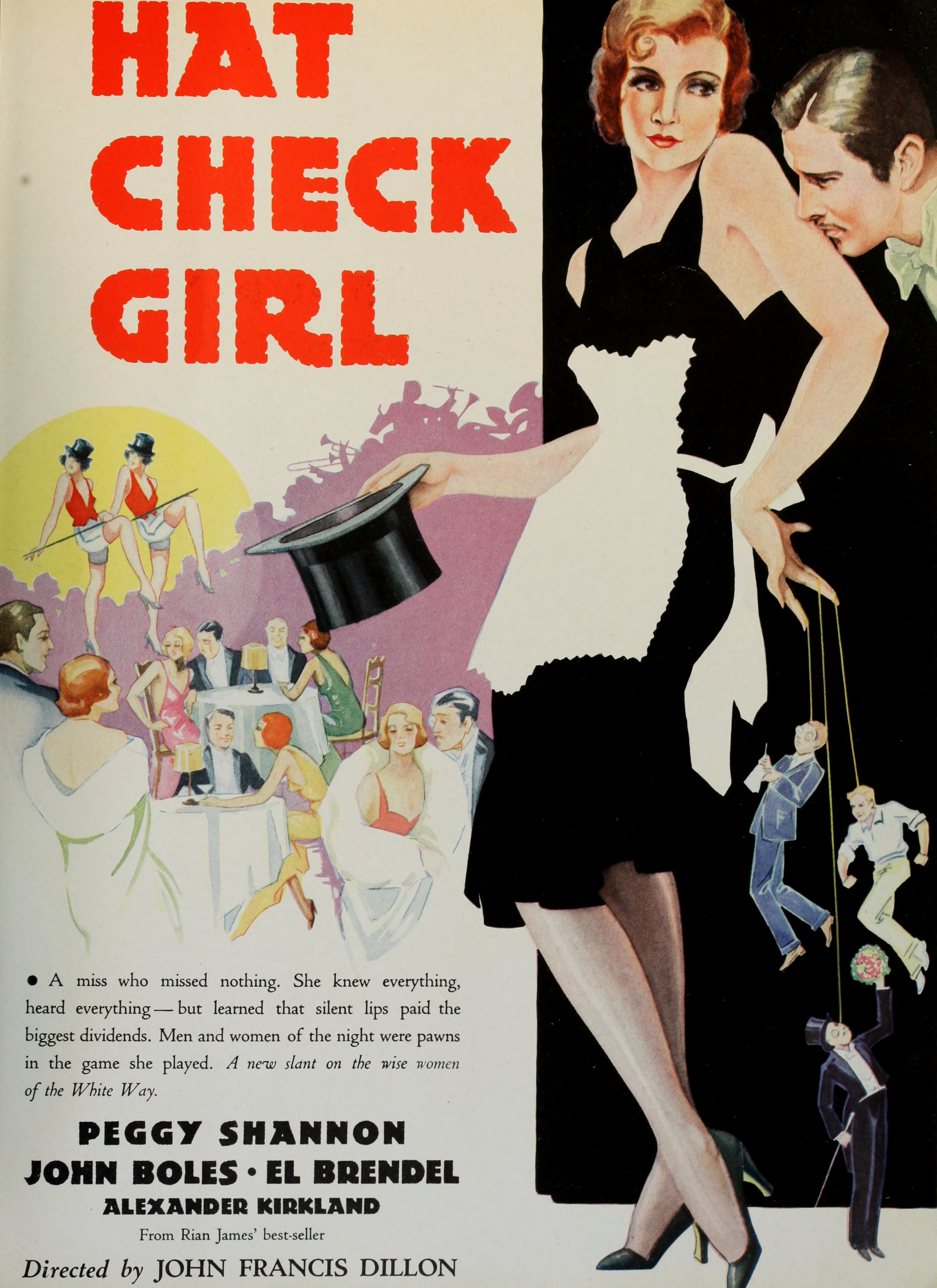
- Hat Check Girl 1932 ad
- Directed by: Sidney Lanfield
- Screenplay by: Barry Conners; Philip Klein
- Story by: Rian James
- Produced by: Sol M. Wurtzel
- Starring: Sally Eilers; Ben Lyon; Ginger Rogers; Monroe Owsley
- Cinematography: Glen MacWilliams
- Edited by: Paul Weatherwax
- Music by: Arthur Lange
- Production company: Fox Film Corporation
- Distributed by: Fox Film Corporation
- Release date: October 8, 1932
- Running time: 75 minutes
- Country: United States
- Language: English

Hat Check Girl is a 1932 American pre-Code comedy film directed by Sidney Lanfield and written by Barry Conners and Philip Klein. The film stars Sally Eilers, Ben Lyon, Ginger Rogers and Monroe Owsley. The film was released on October 8, 1932, by Fox Film Corporation.

== Cast ==
- Sally Eilers as Gerry Marsh
- Ben Lyon as Buster Collins
- Ginger Rogers as Jessie King
- Monroe Owsley as Tod Reese
