= Hot Pepper (1933 film) =

1933 film

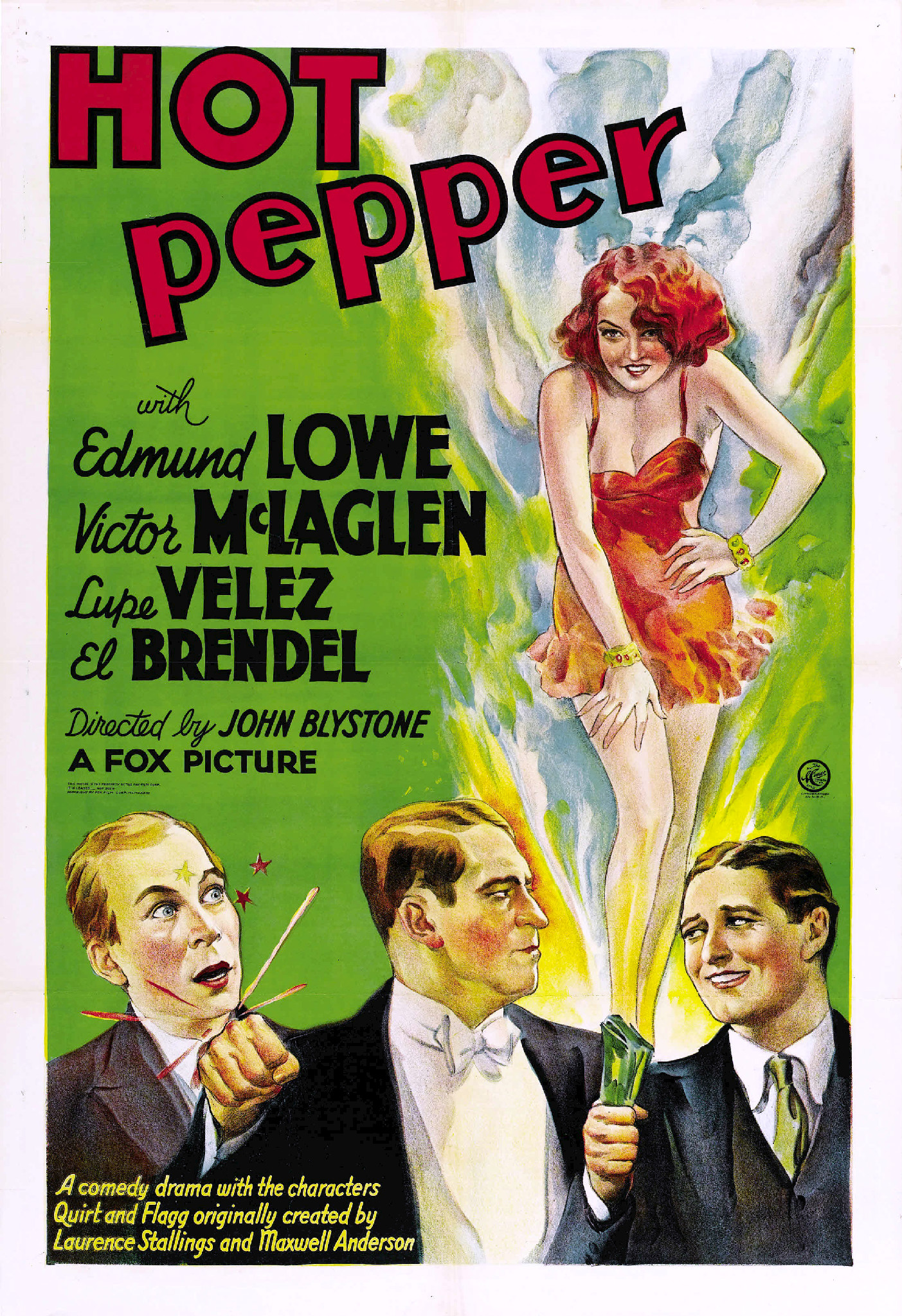
- 1933 theatrical poster
- Directed by: John G. Blystone; Jasper Blystone (assistant director)
- Written by: Dudley Nichols (story); Barry Conners (writer); Philip Klein (story)
- Produced by: William Fox
- Starring: Lupe Vélez; Edmund Lowe
- Cinematography: Charles G. Clarke
- Edited by: Alex Troffey
- Music by: George Lipschultz; William Spielter
- Production company: Fox Film Corporation
- Distributed by: Fox Film Corporation
- Release date: January 15, 1933
- Running time: 76 minutes
- Country: United States
- Language: English

Hot Pepper (1933) is an American pre-Code comedy film starring Lupe Vélez, Edmund Lowe, and Victor McLaglen, directed by John G. Blystone and released by Fox Film Corporation. The film appeared before the enforcement of the Production Code.

This film is considered a fourth installment in the series of films dating back to the silent film What Price Glory? (1926), starring Lowe and McLaglen in their characters of Sergeant Harry Quirt and Captain Jim Flagg with Dolores del Río as the female costar. The pair made a sequel to that film called The Cock-Eyed World (1929), co-starring Lili Damita. Another film, Women of All Nations (1931), followed before 1933's Hot Pepper.

== Cast ==
- Edmund Lowe as Harry Quirt
- Lupe Vélez as Pepper
- Victor McLaglen as Jim Flagg
- El Brendel as Olsen
- Lilian Bond as Hortense
- Boothe Howard as Trigger Thomas
- Gloria Roy as Lily
- Leo White as Waiter (uncredited)
