= Tropic Zone (film) =

1953 film by Lewis R. Foster

- Theatrical release poster
- Directed by: Lewis R. Foster
- Screenplay by: Lewis R. Foster
- Based on: novel Gentlemen of the Jungle by Tom Gill
- Produced by: William H. Pine; William C. Thomas
- Starring: Ronald Reagan; Rhonda Fleming; Estelita Rodriguez; Noah Beery Jr. Grant Withers; John Wengraf
- Cinematography: Lionel Lindon
- Edited by: Howard A. Smith
- Music by: Lucien Cailliet
- Production company: Pine-Thomas Productions
- Distributed by: Paramount Pictures
- Release date: January 14, 1953
- Running time: 94 minutes
- Country: United States
- Language: English

Tropic Zone is a 1953 American crime film written and directed by Lewis R. Foster and starring Ronald Reagan, Rhonda Fleming, Estelita Rodriguez, Noah Beery Jr., Grant Withers and John Wengraf. It was released on January 14, 1953, by Paramount Pictures.

== Plot ==
Reagan's character, Dan McCloud, is an American (described as a "soldier of fortune" in the publicity for the picture's release) who becomes the foreman of a Central American banana plantation. Learning that his employer, Lukats, is corrupt and trying to corner the market, McCloud joins with one of the smaller growers (played by Rhonda Fleming) to organize the workers and stop Lukats' scheme.

== Cast ==
- Ronald Reagan as Dan McCloud
- Rhonda Fleming as Flanders White
- Estelita Rodriguez as Elena Estebar
- Noah Beery Jr. as Tapachula Sam
- Grant Withers as Bert Nelson
- John Wengraf as Lukats
- Argentina Brunetti as Tia Feliciana
- Maurice Jara as Macario

== Production ==
The film was based on a 1939 novel by Tom Gill called Gentlemen of the Jungle about a banana plantation in British Honduras. In May 1951 the producers at Pine-Thomas Productions read a copy of the novel en route to the premiere of their film The Last Outpost in Tucson. They bought the film rights intending to make it a vehicle for Rhoda Fleming, as the last of a four-picture deal she had with Pine-Thomas. (Earlier films included Last Outpost, Crosswinds and Hong Kong.) Ronald Reagan eventually signed to co star.

Estelita Rodriguez was borrowed from Republic.

Paramount built a large set for the film, reportedly the studio's biggest new set in ten years. Designed by art director A. Earl Hedrick together with studio supervisor Hal Pereira, and covering four stages, the set depicted "a complete Caribbean native village", with "16 buildings, irrigation ditches, five hilltops, a schoolhouse, two roads, two streams, a complicated powerhouse" and more.

Edith Head, who had already won the first four of her eight Academy Awards, handled the costumes for the film, highlighted by Fleming's fourteen different outfits, all of them in "jungle tones".

== Reception ==
Reagan later dismissed the film as a "sand and banana" picture with a "hopeless" script.
