= Tom Gill (writer) =

American novelist

Tom H. Gill
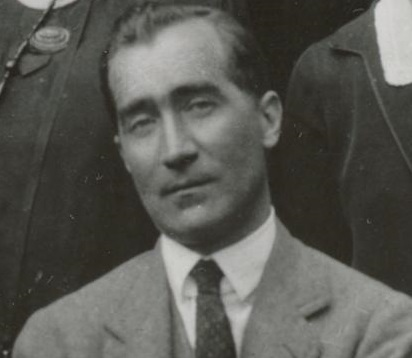
- Born: January 21, 1891; Philadelphia, Pennsylvania, United States
- Died: May 21, 1972 (aged 81); Washington, D.C.
- Education: University of Pennsylvania, Yale University
- Known for: Tropical forestry research; Charles Lathrop Pack Forestry Foundation; Food and Agriculture Organization (FAO) of the United Nations; International Society of Tropical Foresters.
- Awards: Knight of the Order of Agricultural Merit, France (1947); Order of Merit of the Federal Republic of Germany (1961); Schlich Memorial Award, Society of American Foresters (1954)
- Scientific career
- Fields: Forestry
- Workplaces: U.S. Forest Service; Charles Lathrop Pack Forestry Foundation

Thomas Harvey Gill (January 21, 1891 – May 21, 1972) was a leader in American forestry, adventurer, writer of popular fiction and editor of an academic journal.

== Forester ==
Gill received a Master of Forestry degree from Yale University in 1915. Gill served with the U.S. Forest Service from 1915 to 1925, other than his service as a U.S. Army pilot during World War I. From 1926 to 1960, he served as secretary and forester for the Charles Lathrop Pack Forestry Foundation. Under the Oberlaender Trust of the Carl Schurz Memorial Foundation, Gill was part of the 1936 group of eight American foresters who toured Germany and Austria to observe and study forest management in Europe. Gill played an important role in establishing the forestry division of the Food and Agriculture Organization of the United Nations and founded the International Society of Tropical Foresters. He was elected a Fellow of the Society of American Foresters in 1948 and was a recipient of its Sir William Schlich Memorial Award in 1954. He was also awarded the Bernhard Eduard Fernow Medal from the American Forestry Association in 1967, and was named a Fellow of the Forest History Society in 1972. Gill's citations from foreign governments include the French Ordre du Mérite agricole in 1947 and the German Verdienstkreuz in 1961. In 1969, the President of Mexico awarded Gill the gold medal for Civic Merit; he was the first United States citizen to be so honored. The Mexican Institute of Natural Renewable Resources granted him its Diploma of Honor in 1965. In 1966, at the VI World Forestry Congress in Spain, he was recipient of the Medal of Honor.

== Scholar ==
In 1938, along with Harry Stack Sullivan and Ernest E. Hadley he founded the interdisciplinary journal Psychiatry: Journal of the Biology and Pathology of Interpersonal Relations (now Psychiatry: Interpersonal and Biological Processes).

== Novelist ==
Tom Gill authored many popular and academic works. His fiction centered on stories of adventure involving cowboys, forest rangers, and frontier characters. His 12 books of fiction included Guardians of the Desert, Death Rides the Mesa, North to Danger, Firebrand, and No Place for Women.

Fox Movietone adapted Gill's story The Gay Bandit of the Border, releasing the film as The Gay Caballero in 1932. His 1939 novel Gentlemen of the Jungle was adapted into the film Tropic Zone (film).

== End of life ==
Tom Gill died in Washington, DC, on May 21, 1972, at the age of 81.
