= The Black Camel (film) =

1931 film

- Directed by: Hamilton MacFadden
- Written by: Hugh Stanislaus Stange (adaptation)
- Screenplay by: Barry Conners; Philip Klein; Dudley Nichols (uncredited)
- Based on: The Black Camel by Earl Derr Biggers
- Produced by: Hamilton MacFadden
- Starring: Warner Oland; Sally Eilers; Bela Lugosi; Dorothy Revier
- Cinematography: Joseph August; Daniel B. Clark
- Edited by: Alfred DeGaetano
- Production companies: Fox Film Corporation; Hamilton MacFadden
- Distributed by: Fox Film Corporation
- Release date: June 21, 1931
- Running time: 67 or 71 minutes
- Country: United States
- Language: English

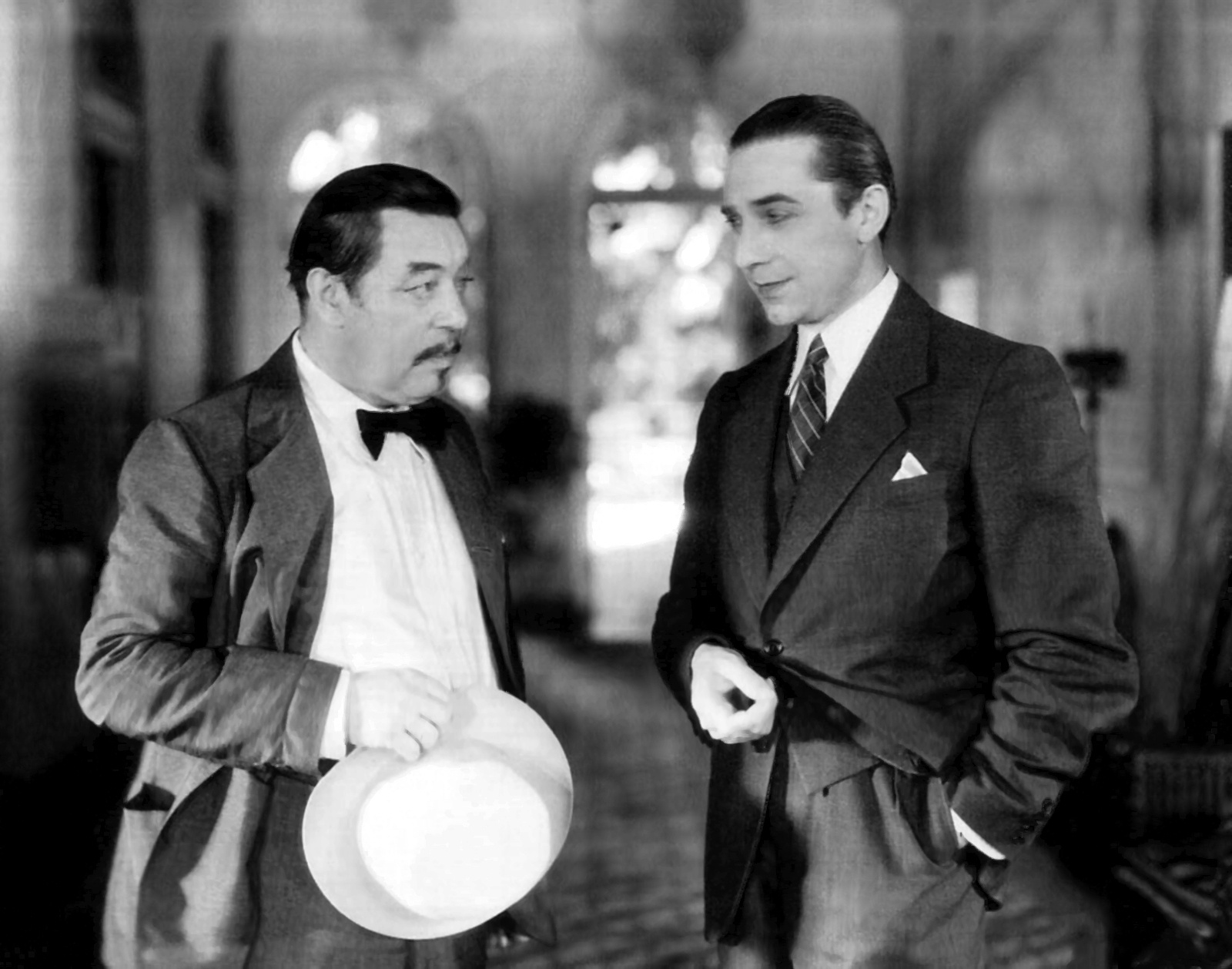
Warner Oland and Béla Lugosi

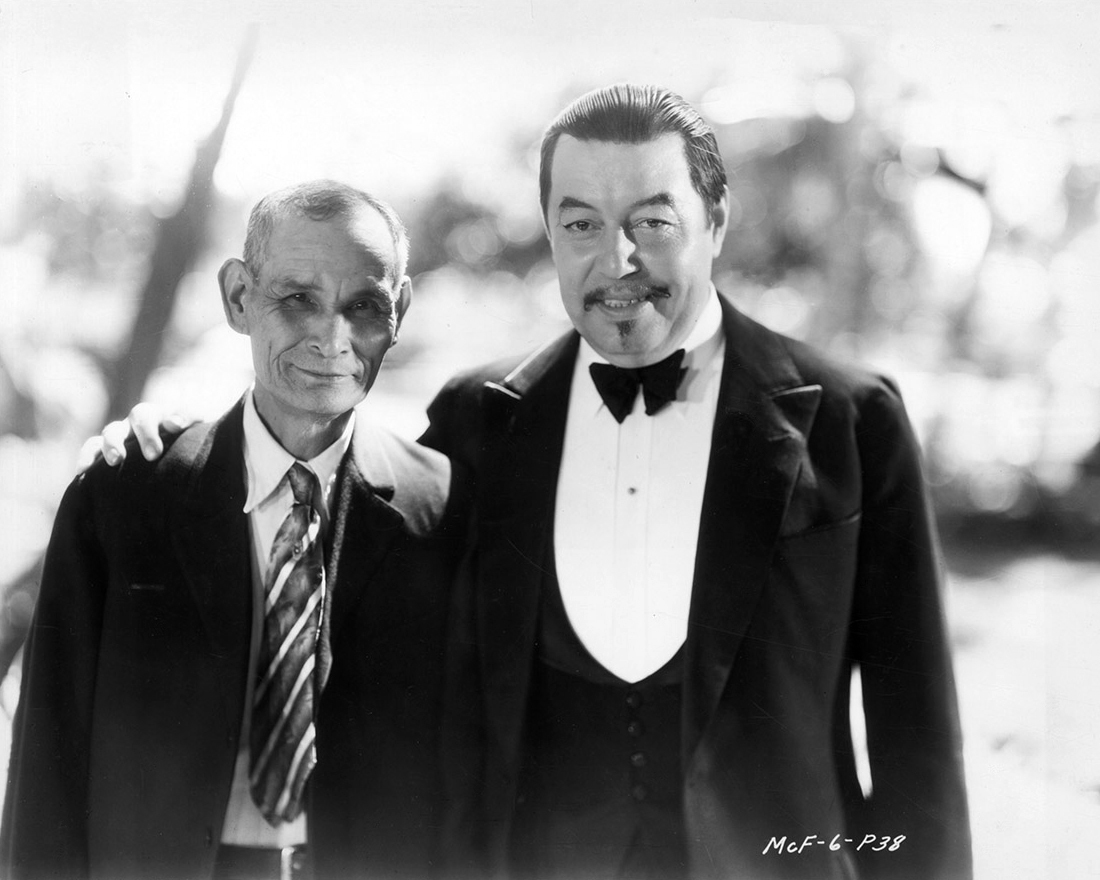
Oland on the production set of The Black Camel at Kailua Beach, with Chang Apana, the Honolulu detective who inspired the character of Charlie Chan

The Black Camel is a 1931 American pre-Code mystery film directed by Hamilton MacFadden and starring Warner Oland, Sally Eilers, Bela Lugosi, and Dorothy Revier. It is based on the 1929 novel of the same name by Earl Derr Biggers. It is the second film to star Oland as detective Charlie Chan, and the sole surviving title of the first five Chan films starring Oland. The Black Camel marked the film debut of Robert Young.

== Plot ==
Movie star Shelah Fayne is making a picture on location in Honolulu, Hawaii. She summons mystic adviser Tarneverro from Hollywood to help her decide whether to marry wealthy Alan Jaynes, a man she has known for only a week. Her friend Julie O'Neil worries, however, that the famous psychic has too much influence over Fayne. Meanwhile, Julie has fallen in love herself with local publicity director Jimmy Bradshaw.

Honolulu Police Inspector Chan pretends to be a humble merchant, but Tarneverro sees through his impersonation. Chan mentions to him the yet unsolved murder of film star Denny Mayo, committed three years before.

Then Jimmy finds Shelah's body; she has been murdered. Julie makes him remove Shelah's ring before calling for the police.

Chan investigates. He invites Tarneverro to assist him. Tarneverro reveals that Shelah told him she was in love with Denny and was responsible for his death, but kept quiet to protect her career.

The suspects are many, but after various startling revelations, Chan eventually identifies the killer and the connection to Danny Mayo's death.

== Cast ==
- Warner Oland as Inspector Charlie Chan
- Sally Eilers as Julie O'Neil
- Bela Lugosi as Tarneverro / Arthur Mayo
- Dorothy Revier as Shelah Fane
- Victor Varconi as Robert Fyfe, Shelah's ex-husband
- Murray Kinnell as Archie Smith
- Robert Young as Jimmy Bradshaw
- Violet Dunn as Anna
- J.M. Kerrigan as Thomas MacMasters
- Mary Gordon as Mrs. MacMasters
- Rita Rozelle as Luana
- Otto Yamaoka as Kashimo
- Dwight Frye as Jessop (uncredited)
- Hamilton MacFadden as Val Martino (uncredited)

=== Other ===
The film further reunited Lugosi with Dwight Frye (playing Jessop, the butler), who had appeared with him in Dracula in the same year. C. Henry Gordon, who had been in Warner Oland's first (lost) Chan film and would show up in three more Chan films with both Oland and the later Chan Sidney Toler, appears uncredited as Huntley Van Horn, and William Post Jr. plays Captain Allan Jayne, Shelah's fiancée.

The small but crucial role of Anna the housekeeper was played by stage actress Violet Dunn, the wife of director Hamilton MacFadden.

== Production ==
Much of the picture was shot on location in Honolulu, with several scenes filmed at the renowned Royal Hawaiian Hotel. The opening beach scene was filmed at Kailua Beach.

== Critical reception ==
A review of the film in The New York Times reported that Chan "follows clues to their ends, retains his bland manner while the lights go out and knives rattle about his head, and delivers the calm aphorisms of Earl Derr Biggers," and noted that Oland "gives to the picture a good and even performance."

== Bibliography ==
- Hanke, Ken, Charlie Chan at the Movies: History, Filmography, and Criticism, McFarland & Company Publishers, Jefferson, North Carolina, and London, 1989, ISBN 0-89950-427-2.
