= Jake the Plumber =

1927 film

- Directed by: Edward Ludwig
- Written by: Edward Ludwig; James J. Tynan
- Produced by: Joseph P. Kennedy
- Starring: Jesse De Vorska; Sharon Lynn; Rosa Rosanova
- Cinematography: Philip Tannura
- Production company: Robertson-Cole Pictures Corporation
- Distributed by: Film Booking Offices of America; Ideal Films (UK)
- Release date: October 16, 1927
- Running time: 60 minutes
- Country: United States
- Languages: Silent; English intertitles

Jake the Plumber is a 1927 American silent comedy film directed by Edward Ludwig and starring Jesse De Vorska, Sharon Lynn and Rosa Rosanova.

== Synopsis ==
The film follows the adventures of Jake, a Jewish apprentice to the Irish plumber Fogarty. Jake wants to earn enough money to marry Sarah, a jealous girl, who he is in love with. The chance comes when he has to substitute for a jockey in a big horse race.

== Cast ==
- Jesse De Vorska as Jake, the Plumber
- Sharon Lynn as Sarah Levine
- Rosa Rosanova as Mrs. Levine
- Ann Brody as Mrs. Schwartz
- Bud Jamison as Fogarty
- Carol Holloway as Mrs. Levis
- William H. Tooker as Mr. Levis
- Dolores Brinkman as Sadie Rosen
- Eddie Harris as Poppa Levine
- Fanchon Frankel as Rachael Rosenblatt

== Bibliography ==
- Connelly, Robert B. The Silents: Silent Feature Films, 1910-36, Volume 40, Issue 2. December Press, 1998.
- Munden, Kenneth White. The American Film Institute Catalog of Motion Pictures Produced in the United States, Part 1. University of California Press, 1997.
