= The Sky Hawk =

1929 film

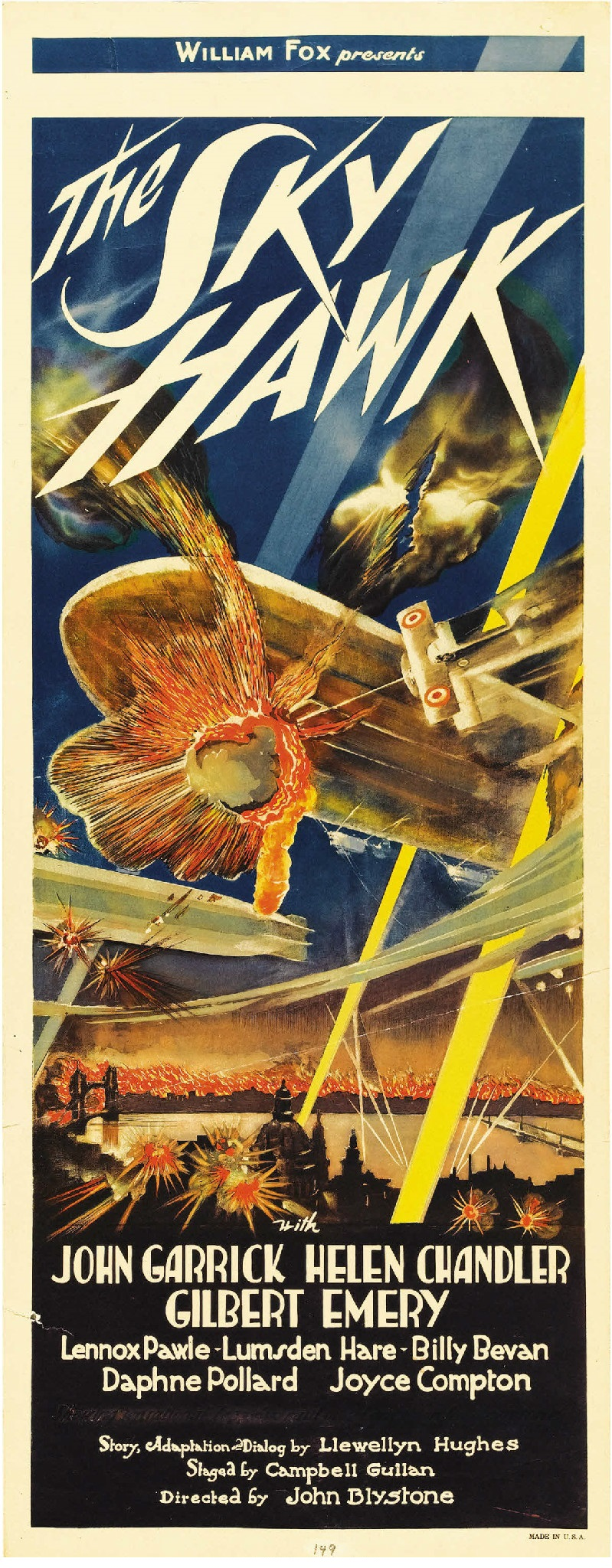
- Theatrical poster
- Directed by: John G. Blystone
- Written by: Llewellyn Hughes
- Produced by: William Fox
- Starring: John Garrick; Helen Chandler; Gilbert Emery; Lennox Pawle
- Cinematography: Conrad Wells
- Edited by: Ralph Dietrich
- Music by: Charles Wakefield Cadman
- Distributed by: Fox Film Corporation
- Release dates: December 11, 1929 (premiere); January 29, 1930
- Running time: 67 minutes
- Country: United States
- Language: English

The Sky Hawk is a 1929 American pre-Code adventure film, produced and distributed by Fox Film Corporation and directed by John G. Blystone. The screenplay was adapted by Llewellyn Hughes from his article "Chap Called Bardell" and novelized by Guy Fowler. The film stars John Garrick, Helen Chandler and Gilbert Emery.

== Plot ==
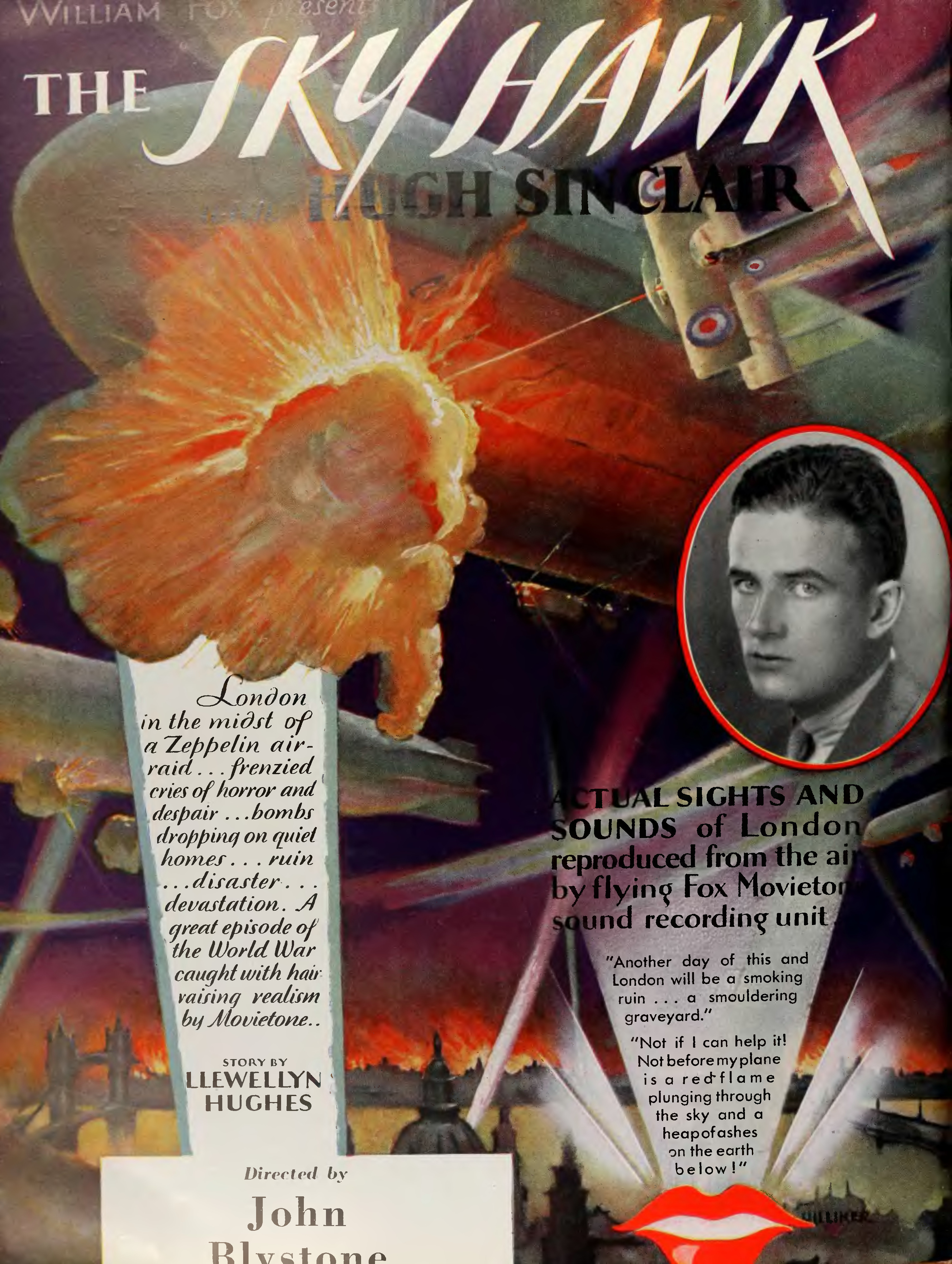
The Sky Hawk ad in The Film Daily, 1929

World War I British aviator Jack Bardell is discharged from the service after a suspicious aircraft crash that his fellow pilots believe show that he was a coward in the face of the enemy. He is left temporarily paralyzed from the waist down, and enlists the aid of his mechanic Tom Berry to rebuild a wrecked fighter aircraft. Bardell recuperates to the extent that he is able to fly again, redeeming himself during a German Zeppelin attack over London, bringing down one of the airships.

== Cast ==
- John Garrick as Jack Bardell
- Helen Chandler as Joan Allan
- Gilbert Emery as Major Nelson
- Lennox Pawle as Lord Bardell
- Lumsden Hare as Judge Allan
- Billy Bevan as Tom Berry
- Daphne Pollard as Minnie
- Joyce Compton as Peggy
- Percy Challenger as Charles, the butler (Note: Uncredited roles: Jimmy Aubrey as ground crewman; Hans Fuerberg as Zeppelin navigator; Mary Gordon as Mary, the maid; David Manners as pilot; Ellinor Vanderveer as car passenger)

== Production ==
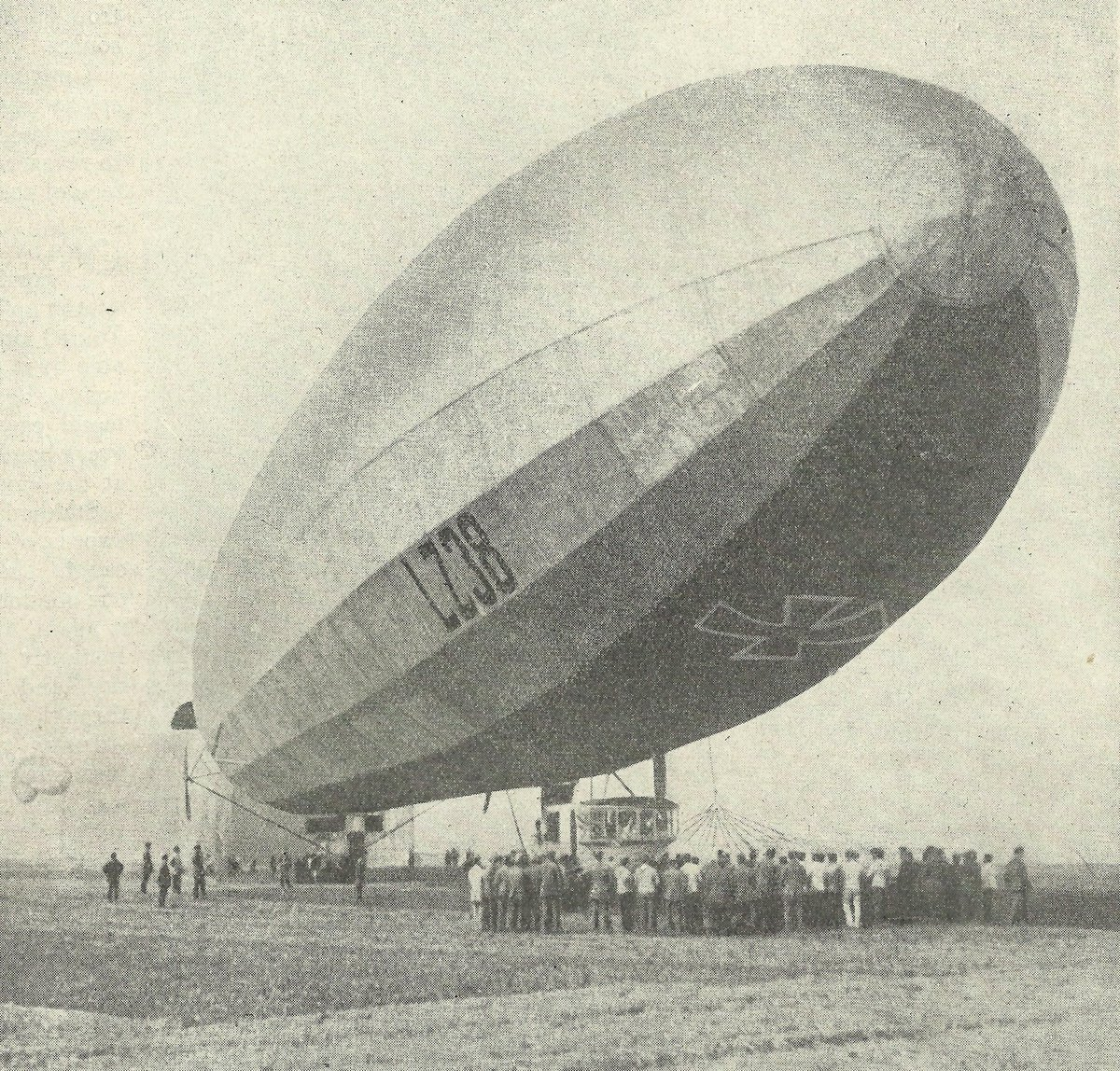
The first airship to bomb London on 31 May 1915. This Zeppelin LZ 38 dropped 1,400 kilograms of bombs that day, killing seven.

In a period when studios were adapting to the new "sound" technology, The Sky Hawk successfully utilized sound throughout the production. One of the most impressive aspects of the film was Special Effects Coordinator Ralph Hammeras creating a large-scale miniature of the city of London in the Fox Studios airfield hangar built for Hell's Angels (1930). Hammeras also created special mechanical effects, utilizing miniature aircraft and a model Zeppelin in the climatic Zeppelin raid sequence. Blystone's brother Jasper was the assistant director on The Sky Hawk.

The production was completed over a five-week period beginning in August 1928. Location shooting took place at Ross Army Air Field in Arcadia, California. For The Sky Hawk, the base was converted into a Royal Air Force air base, with a small group of Thomas-Morse Scout, Laird Swallow and Travel Air biplanes "dressed up" as British fighters.

== Reception ==
The Sky Hawk premiered on December 11, 1929, at the Gaiety Theater in New York to positive reviews. Mordaunt Hall of The New York Times praised the film, noting: "A melodrama of the skies which has not been equaled in its adroit handling, its competent acting, its authentic atmospheric effects, or the tonal quality of the voices of the participants was launched last night by William Fox at the Gaiety Theatre."
