= Lilian Bond =

English-American actress (1908–1991)

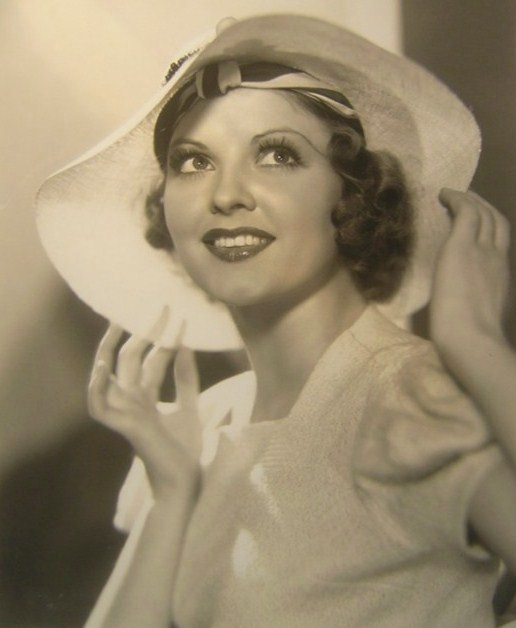
- Publicity photo of Bond, 1933
- Born: January 18, 1908; London, England, United Kingdom
- Died: January 25, 1991 (aged 83); Reseda, California, U.S.
- Years active: 1922–1958
- Spouse(s): Sidney Smith (m. 1935; div. 1944) Morton Lowry (m. 1950; div. 1956) Michael Fessier (m. 1961; died 1988)
- Children: 2

Lilian Bond (January 18, 1908 – January 25, 1991) was an English-American actress based in the United States.

== Life and career ==
Bond was born in London and made her first professional stage appearance at the age of 14 in the pantomime Dick Whittington and His Cat. Later she joined the chorus of Piccadilly Revels and continued on the stage when she relocated to the United States, where her performances included roles in The Earl Carroll Vanities, a long run in Follow Thru and in various productions of the Ziegfeld Follies.

Bond began working in films in 1929, initially in the drama No More Children for Cliff Broughton Productions. Between 1929 and 1931, she co-starred in eight additional films, most notably with Tom Tyler in the 1931 Western Rider of the Plains. In 1932, she was named a WAMPAS Baby Star, along with Gloria Stuart, Ginger Rogers, and other young actresses rising in popularity with theater audiences.

From 1932 to 1953, she had roles in 39 more films, ranging from lead characters to uncredited performances. In James Whale's comedic thriller starring Boris Karloff titled The Old Dark House (1932), Bond plays Gladys DuCane, a chorus girl who falls in love with Roger Penderel (played by Melvyn Douglas). Perhaps her best-known film role is in the 1940 Western The Westerner starring Gary Cooper and Walter Brennan. In that production she portrays the British-American actress and socialite Lillie Langtry. By the 1950s, her career had declined, with her having mostly TV appearances. She retired from acting at the age of 50 in 1958.

== Personal life and death ==
Bond technically married four times (including marrying the same man twice) and had 2 children. At the height of her career, on June 28, 1935, she wed Sidney Smith, a successful New York broker and big-game hunter; however, "a technical legal question" required the couple to remarry on September 3, 1936. In 1943 they separated, with each accusing the other of cruelty. Their divorce was finalized the next year.

In 1950, Bond married Morton Lowry; the union lasted six years. Finally, in 1961, she wed Michael Fessier, who was a screenwriter, film producer, and novelist. The two remained together until his death in 1988. Three years later, at age 83, Bond suffered a heart attack and died at a convalescent hospital in Reseda, California.

== Selected filmography ==
- Sagebrush Politics (1930) as Cleo
- Stepping Out (1931)
- Manhattan Parade (1931) as Sewing girl
- The Squaw Man (1931) as Babs
- Rider of the Plains (1931) as Betty
- Hot Saturday (1932) as Eva Randolph
- Beauty and the Boss (1932) as Girl at the bar
- Man About Town (1932) as Carlotta Cortez
- The Old Dark House (1932) as Gladys
- Fireman, Save My Child (1932) as June Farnum
- High Pressure (1932)
- It's Tough to Be Famous (1932) as Edna Jackson
- Union Depot (1932) as Actress on train (uncredited)
- Air Mail (1932) as Irene Walkins
- The Trial of Vivienne Ware (1932) as Dolores Divine
- When Strangers Marry (1933) as Marion Drake
- Double Harness (1933) as Monica Page
- Take a Chance (1933) as Thelma Green
- Hot Pepper (1933) as Hortense
- Her Splendid Folly (1933) as Jill McAllister
- Pick-Up (1933) as Muriel Stevens
- The Big Brain (1933) as Dorothy Norton
- Hell Bent for Love (1934) as Millie Garland
- Dirty Work (1934)
- Affairs of a Gentleman (1934) as Carlotta Barbe
- The Bishop Misbehaves (1935) as Mrs. Millie Walker
- China Seas (1935) - Mrs. Timmons
- Blond Cheat (1938) as Roberta Trent
- Sued for Libel (1939) as Muriel Webster
- The Women (1939) as Mrs. Erskine
- The Housekeeper's Daughter (1939) as Gladys Fontaine
- The Westerner (1940) as Lillie Langtry
- Scotland Yard (1941) as Lady Constance
- A Desperate Chance for Ellory Queen (1942) as Adele Beldon
- A Tragedy at Midnight (1942) as Lola
- The Picture of Dorian Gray (1945) as Kate
- Nocturne (1946) as Mrs. Billings
- The Jolson Story (1947)
- Fighter Squadron (1948) as English lady
- That Forsythe Woman (1949) as Maid
- Shadow on the Wall (1950) as Attendant
- The Sniper (1952) as Mrs. Fitzpatrick
- The Big Trees (1952) as Daisy's girl
- Man in the Attic (1953) as Annie Rowley
- The Maze (1953) as Margaret Dilling
- Pirates of Tripoli (1955) as Sono
