= The Social Highwayman =

1926 film

- Directed by: William Beaudine
- Written by: Philip Klein; Edward T. Lowe Jr. Darryl F. Zanuck
- Starring: John Patrick
- Cinematography: John J. Mescall
- Production company: Warner Bros.
- Distributed by: Warner Bros.
- Release date: May 15, 1926; (limited release)
- Running time: 70 minutes
- Country: United States
- Language: Silent (English intertitles)

The Social Highwayman is a 1926 American silent comedy film directed by William Beaudine. A print of The Social Highwayman exists at the Cineteca Italiana film archive in Milan, Italy.

== Cast ==
- John Patrick as Jay Walker
- Dorothy Devore as Elsie Van Tyler
- Montagu Love as Ducket Nelson
- Russell Simpson as The Mayor's Partner
- George C. Pearce as Old Van Tyler (as George Pearce)
- Lynn Cowan as Bobbie
- James Gordon as Editor
- Frank Brownlee as Simpson
- Fred Kelsey as Chief of Police
- Charles Hill Mailes as The Mayor
