= Dudley Nichols =

American screenwriter and film director (1895–1960)

- Born: April 6, 1895; Wapakoneta, Ohio, United States
- Died: January 4, 1960 (aged 64); Los Angeles, California, United States
- Education: University of Michigan
- Occupations: Screenwriter, film director

Dudley Nichols (April 6, 1895 – January 4, 1960) was an American screenwriter and film director. He was the first person to decline an Academy Award, as part of a boycott to gain recognition for the Screen Writers Guild; he would later accept his Academy Award for Best Original Screenplay in 1938.

== Biography ==
Dudley Nichols was born April 6, 1895, in Wapakoneta, Ohio. He studied at the University of Michigan where he was an active member of the Sigma chapter of Theta Xi fraternity.

After working as a reporter for the New York Evening Post, Nichols moved to Hollywood in 1929 and became one of the most highly regarded screenwriters of the 1930s and 1940s. He collaborated on many films over many years with director John Ford, and was also noted for his work with George Cukor, Howard Hawks, Fritz Lang and Jean Renoir.

Nichols wrote or co-wrote the screenplays for films including Bringing Up Baby (1938), Stagecoach (1939), For Whom the Bell Tolls (1943), Scarlet Street (1945), And Then There Were None (1945), The Bells of St. Mary's (1945), Pinky (1949) and The Tin Star (1957).

Nichols initially declined the Academy Award he received in 1936 for The Informer, due to a dispute between the Screen Writers Guild, of which he was a founder, and the Academy of Motion Picture Arts and Sciences. He collected the award at the 1938 Oscar ceremony. He served as president of the Screen Writers Guild in 1937 and 1938.

He also co-wrote the documentary The Battle of Midway, which won the 1942 Academy Award for Best Documentary Feature.

Nichols produced and directed three films—Government Girl (1943), Sister Kenny (1946) and Mourning Becomes Electra (1947)—for which he also wrote the screenplay.

== Awards ==
In 1954 he received the Laurel Award for Screenwriting Achievement from the Writers Guild of America.

== Death ==
Nichols died of cancer on January 4, 1960 at Cedars of Lebanon Hospital after being in the hospital since December 14. His funeral was held at Hollywood Forever Cemetery.

== Filmography ==
Year	Title	Notes
1930	Men Without Women	
1930	Born Reckless	
1930	On the Level	
1930	One Mad Kiss	
1930	A Devil with Women	
1931	Not Exactly Gentlemen	
1931	Seas Beneath	
1931	A Connecticut Yankee	
1931	Hush Money	
1931	Skyline	
1931	Reckless Living	
1931	The Black Camel	
1932	She Wanted a Millionaire	
1932	While Paris Sleeps	
1932	This Sporting Age	
1933	Robbers Roost	
1933	The Man Who Dared	
1933	Pilgrimage	
1933	Hot Pepper	
1934	Frontier Marshal	
1934	You Can't Buy Everything	
1934	Ever Since Eve	
1934	The Lost Patrol	
1934	Hold That Girl	
1934	Call It Luck	
1934	Wild Gold	
1934	Grand Canary	
1934	Judge Priest	
1935	Mystery Woman	
1935	Life Begins at 40	
1935	The Informer	Academy Award, Best Writing, Screenplay (not accepted until 1938)
1935	The Arizonian	
1935	She	
1935	Steamboat Round the Bend	
1935	The Crusades	
1935	The Three Musketeers	
1936	Mary of Scotland	
1937	The Plough and the Stars	
1937	The Toast of New York	
1937	The Hurricane	
1938	Bringing Up Baby	
1938	Carefree	
1939	Gunga Din	
1939	Stagecoach	
1939	The 400 Million	
1940	The Long Voyage Home	Academy Award nominee
1941	Man Hunt	
1941	Swamp Water	
1942	The Battle of Midway	
1943	Air Force	Academy Award nominee
1943	This Land Is Mine	
1943	Mr. Lucky	
1943	For Whom the Bell Tolls	
1944	Government Girl	Also producer and director
1944	It Happened Tomorrow	
1945	And Then There Were None	
1945	The Bells of St. Mary's	
1945	Scarlet Street	
1946	Sister Kenny	Also producer and director
1947	The Fugitive	
1947	Mourning Becomes Electra	Also producer and director
1949	Pinky	
1951	Rawhide	
1952	Return of the Texan	
1952	The Big Sky	
1954	Prince Valiant	
1956	Run for the Sun	
1957	The Tin Star	Academy Award nominee
1959	The Hangman	
1960	Heller in Pink Tights	
