= Barry Conners =

American actor, screenwriter and playwright

- Born: May 31, 1883; Oil City, Pennsylvania; United States
- Died: January 5, 1933 (aged 49); Los Angeles, California; United States
- Occupations: Actor, writer
- Years active: 1928 - 1933 (film)

Barry Conners (1883–1933) was an American actor, screenwriter and playwright. An established writer for the stage, he was employed in Hollywood during the final few years of life during the early sound era.

== Selected filmography ==
- The Patsy (1928)
- Charlie Chan Carries On (1931)
- The Black Camel (1931)
- The Spider (1931)
- There Were Thirteen (1931)
- Riders of the Purple Sage (1931)
- Women of All Nations (1931)
- Bachelor's Affairs (1932)
- Chandu the Magician (1932)
- Charlie Chan's Chance (1932)
- Hat Check Girl (1932)
- Me and My Gal (1932)
- The Gay Caballero (1932)
- The Rainbow Trail (1932)
- The Trial of Vivienne Ware (1932)
- Too Busy to Work (1932 film) (1932)
- Hot Pepper (1933)
- Pilgrimage (1933)
- Brides Are Like That (1936)
- Always a Bride (1940)

== Bibliography ==
- Aubrey Solomon. The Fox Film Corporation, 1915-1935: A History and Filmography. McFarland, 2011.
