= The Last Parade (film) =

1931 film

- Directed by: Erle C. Kenton
- Written by: Casey Robinson; Dorothy Howell
- Produced by: Harry Cohn; Jack Cohn
- Starring: Jack Holt; Tom Moore; Constance Cummings
- Cinematography: Ted Tetzlaff
- Edited by: Gene Havlick
- Production company: Columbia Pictures
- Distributed by: Columbia Pictures
- Release date: January 31, 1931
- Running time: 82 minutes
- Country: United States
- Language: English

The Last Parade is a 1931 American pre-Code crime drama film directed by Erle C. Kenton and starring Jack Holt, Tom Moore and Constance Cummings. Boris Karloff allegedly played the prison warden but that is disputed in some sources.

== Plot ==
Two World War I veterans return home. One joins the police while the other, failing to get a job as a newspaper reporter, gets mixed up with organized crime.

== Cast ==
- Jack Holt as Cookie Leonard
- Tom Moore as Mike O'Dowd
- Constance Cummings as Molly Pearson
- Robert Ellis as A.C. Marino
- Steve Pendleton as Larry Pearson
- Jesse De Vorska as Rosenberg
- Robert Graham as Danny Murphy
- Gino Corrado as Joe
- Earle D. Bunn as Lefty
- Vivi as Vivi
- Edmund Breese as City Editor
- Eddy Chandler as Recruit / Veteran
- Richard Cramer as Counter Man
- Weldon Heyburn as Henchman
- Bob Kortman as One of Marino's Henchmen
- Edward LeSaint as Chief of Police
- Clarence Muse as Alabam'
- Lee Phelps as Recruiting Officer
- Harry Strang as One of Marino's Henchman
- Boris Karloff (uncredited) as prison warden (Karloff's appearance is disputed in some sources)

== Bibliography ==
- Dick, Bernard F. The Merchant Prince of Poverty Row: Harry Cohn of Columbia Pictures. University Press of Kentucky, 2015.
