= The Trial of Vivienne Ware =

1932 film

- Directed by: William K. Howard
- Screenplay by: Barry Conners; Philip Klein
- Starring: Joan Bennett; Donald Cook; Richard "Skeets" Gallagher; ZaSu Pitts; Lilian Bond; Alan Dinehart
- Cinematography: Ernest Palmer
- Edited by: Ralph Dietrich
- Production company: Fox Film Corporation
- Distributed by: Fox Film Corporation
- Release date: May 1, 1932
- Running time: 58 minutes
- Country: United States
- Language: English

The Trial of Vivienne Ware is a 1932 American pre-Code drama film directed by William K. Howard, written by Barry Conners and Philip Klein, and starring Joan Bennett, Donald Cook, Richard "Skeets" Gallagher, ZaSu Pitts, Lilian Bond and Alan Dinehart. It was released on May 1, 1932, by Fox Film Corporation.

== Plot ==
A wealthy socialite on trial for the murder of her unfaithful fiancee is defended by her ex-boyfriend.

== Cast ==
- Joan Bennett as Vivienne Ware
- Donald Cook as John Sutherland
- Richard "Skeets" Gallagher as Graham McNally
- ZaSu Pitts as Gladys Fairweather
- Lilian Bond as Dolores Divine
- Alan Dinehart as Prosecutor
- Herbert Mundin as William Boggs
- Howard Phillips as Minetti aka Joe Garson
- William Pawley as Joseph Gilk
- Noel Madison as Angelo Paroni
- Jameson Thomas as Damon Fenwick
- Ruth Selwyn as Mercedes Joy
- Christian Rub as Axel Nordstrom
- Maude Eburne as Mrs. Elizabeth Hardy
- John M. Sullivan as Judge Henderson
