= Too Busy to Work (1932 film) =

1932 film

- Theatrical release poster
- Directed by: John G. Blystone
- Screenplay by: Barry Conners; Philip Klein
- Starring: Will Rogers; Marian Nixon; Dick Powell; Frederick Burton; Charles Middleton; Louise Beavers
- Cinematography: Charles G. Clarke
- Edited by: Alex Troffey
- Music by: Gene Rose
- Production company: Fox Film Corporation
- Distributed by: Fox Film Corporation
- Release date: December 2, 1932
- Running time: 76 minutes
- Country: United States
- Language: English

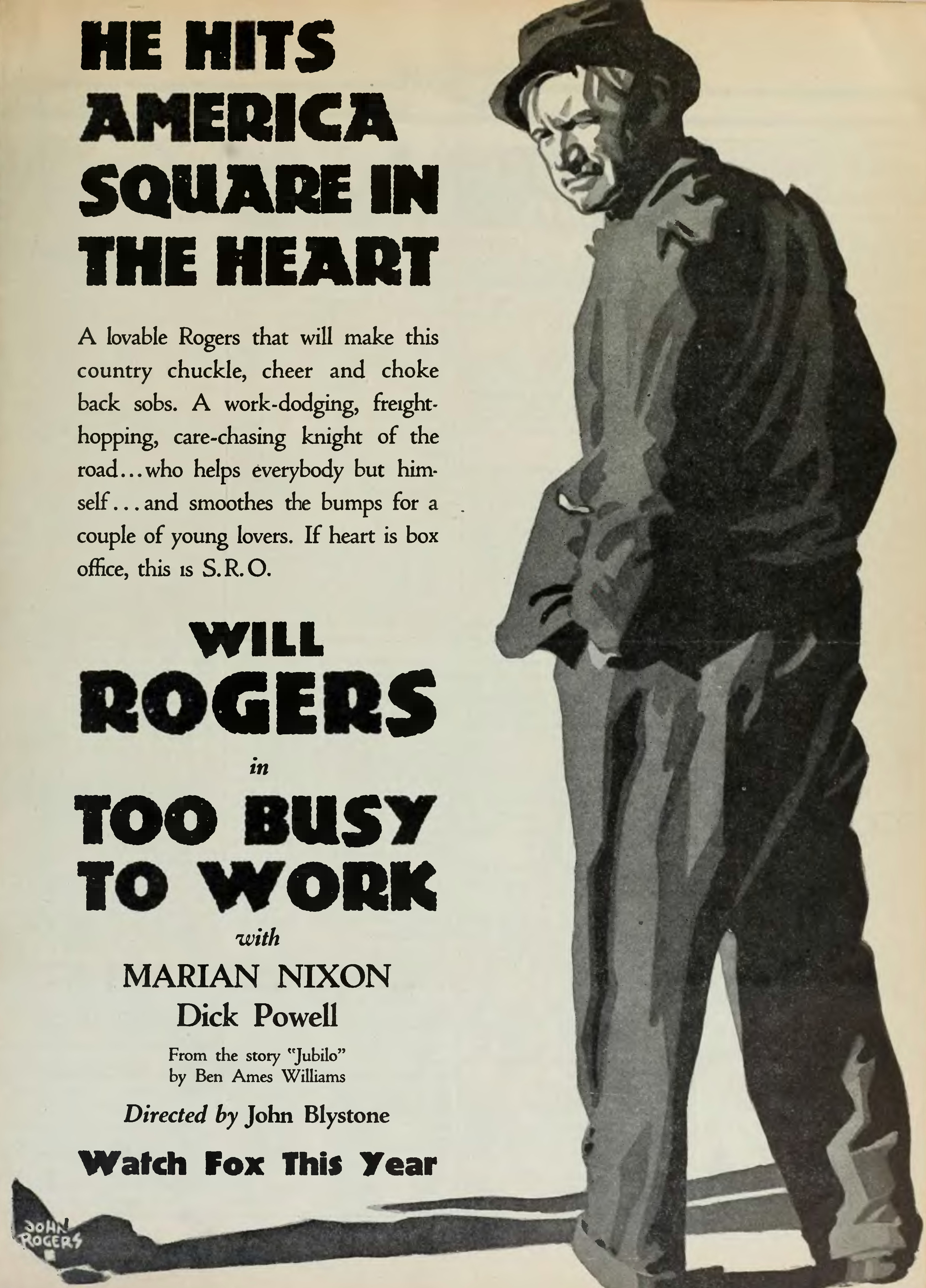
To Busy to Work ad from The Film Daily, 1932

Too Busy to Work is a 1932 American drama film directed by John G. Blystone, written by Barry Conners and Philip Klein, and starring Will Rogers, Marian Nixon, Dick Powell, Frederick Burton, Charles Middleton and Louise Beavers. It was released on December 2, 1932, by Fox Film Corporation.

== Plot ==
Fifteen years after he returned from World War One, Jubilo decides to look up the man who ran away with his wife and toddler daughter while he was at war. Having become a hobo, he takes a rather adventurous on-foot route to the wealthy home of Judge Hardy, and sees his little daughter has grown up to be quite the beauty and is scheduled to marry the Judge's birth son, Dan Hardy.

Jubilo begs a meal from the cook, Mammy, and his easy-going nature helps him talk his way into a hired hand position. He cannot bear to let his daughter out of his sight so soon. Jubilo conducts a running feud with Axel, the other hired hand; and manages to "Tom Sawyer" Axel into doing most of his work for him.

Jubilo keeps a bad family secret---while waiting for two friends to come back to his car one night, the Judge's son saw them commit an armed robbery where a watchman was killed and one of the friends badly wounded. They dropped the friend off at a hospital, and Dan is terrified that things might be traced back to him.

Jubilo's desire for revenge is known to the Judge from guarded conversations. But to speak up would ruin his daughter's life as well. The Judge finally gives Jubilo a loaded gun and tells him he is free to do what he wishes with it.

The local sheriff realizes that Jubilo was at the robbery scene, and brings him in for questioning. Brought to the bedside of the wounded robber, Jubilo whispers to him that it would be nice if he confessed Dan's innocence before he died. The robber eventually does this.

But while Dan is alone in the house, the third robber breaks in and orders Dan to open the safe at gunpoint. Jubilo returns and kills the man in a gun battle with the Judge's gun. It is ruled self defense, and Dan's name is cleared.

Jubilo decides not to tell Rose he is her father, and returns to his wandering ways---although he hints he might stay in walking distance so he can come back for the wedding.

== Cast ==
- Will Rogers as Jubilo
- Marian Nixon as Rose
- Dick Powell as Dan Hardy
- Frederick Burton as Judge Hardy
- Charles Middleton as Chief of Police
- Louise Beavers as Mammy
- Constantine Romanoff as Axel The Farmhand (uncredited)
- Douglas Cosgrove as Sheriff (uncredited)
- Howard Lally as "Red", wounded bandit (uncredited)
