= Jesse De Vorska =

American actor (1898–1999)

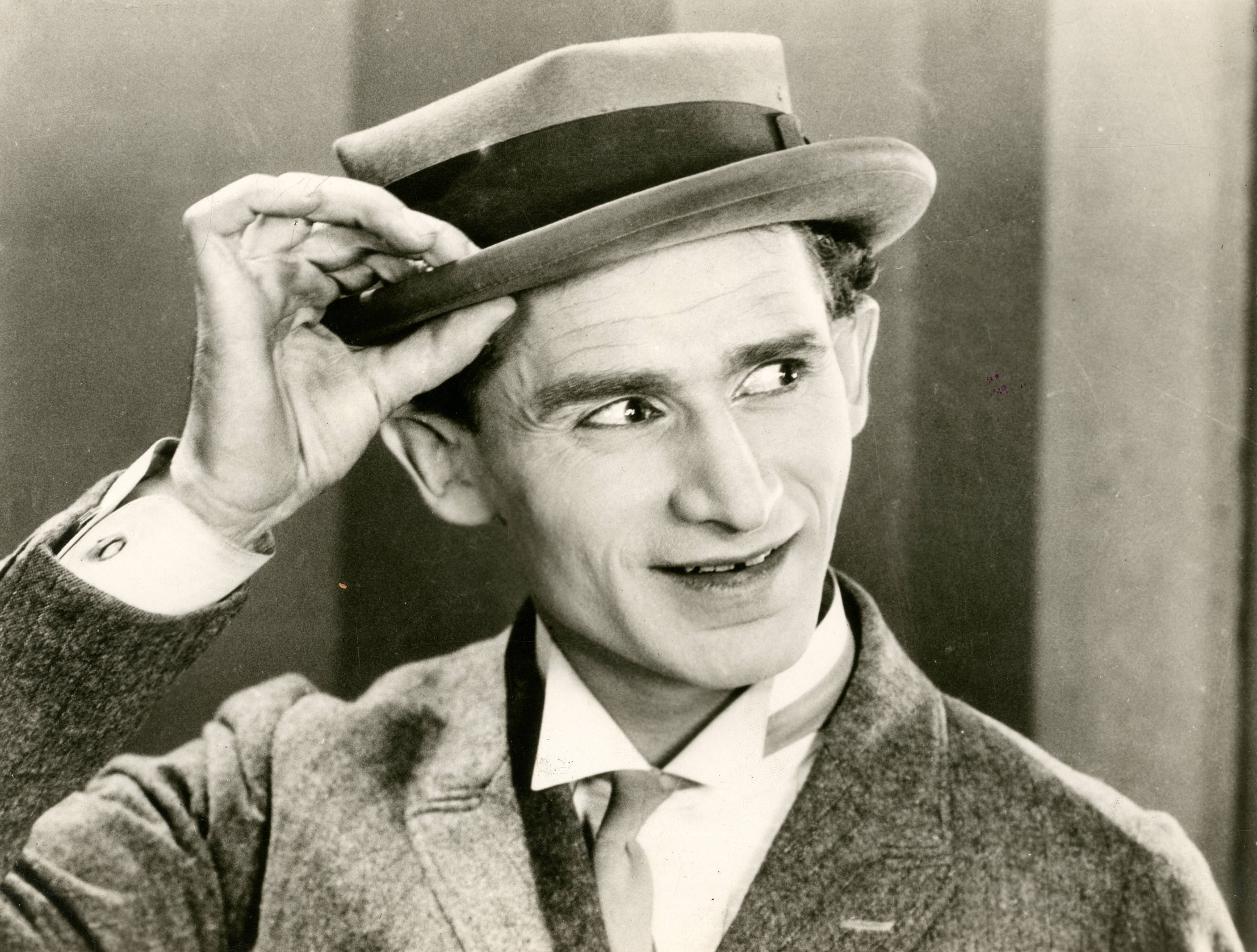
- Born: Jesse Dvorska; July 13, 1898; Kovno, Russian Empire (present-day Kaunas, Lithuania)
- Died: December 27, 1999 (aged 101); Westwood, California, U.S.
- Occupation: Actor
- Years active: 1923–1936 (film)

Jesse De Vorska (July 13, 1898 – December 27, 1999) was a Russian-born American film actor.

De Vorska was born in Kaunas, Lithuania in 1898. He lived on the streets after his parents were killed in pogroms directed at Jewish people. After he began working as a baker's helper, he lived in the bakery. In 1914 a relative who lived in Syracuse, New York, provided funds for him to move there. After being employed as a delivery boy for a Syracuse pharmacy, he found work in a theater there. That job led to an opportunity in vaudeville, and later he began acting in silent films. A heavy Yiddish accent kept him from performing in talking films.

De Vorska was in the Navy in World War I and World War II. He died on December 27, 1999, in Veterans Hospital in Westwood, California, aged 101.

== Selected filmography ==
- The Unknown Soldier (1926)
- Rose of the Tenements (1926)
- Jake the Plumber (1927)
- Around the Corner (1930)
- The Last Parade (1931)
- Women of All Nations (1931)
- Goldie (1931)
- Bad Girl (1931)
- The Spider (1931)
- Symphony of Six Million (1932)
- The Strange Love of Molly Louvain (1932)
- Pier 13 (1932)
- Employees Entrance (1933)
- Wine, Women and Song (1933)
- The Call of the Wild (1935)

== Bibliography ==
- James L. Neibaur. James Cagney Films of the 1930s. Rowman & Littlefield, 2014.
