= Affairs of a Gentleman =

1934 American drama film directed by Edwin L. Marin

- Directed by: Edwin L. Marin
- Screenplay by: Cyril Hume; Peter Ruric; Milton Krims
- Based on: Women; 1928 play by Edith Ellis and Edward Ellis
- Produced by: Carl Laemmle, Jr. Edmund Grainger
- Starring: Paul Lukas; Leila Hyams; Patricia Ellis; Phillip Reed; Onslow Stevens; Dorothy Burgess
- Cinematography: John J. Mescall
- Edited by: Edward Curtiss
- Music by: Edward Ward
- Production company: Universal Pictures
- Distributed by: Universal Pictures
- Release date: May 1, 1934
- Running time: 68 minutes
- Country: United States
- Language: English

Affairs of a Gentleman is a 1934 American Pre-Code drama film directed by Edwin L. Marin and written by Cyril Hume, Peter Ruric and Milton Krims, adapted from the 1928 play Women by Edith Ellis and Edward Ellis. The film stars Paul Lukas, Leila Hyams, Patricia Ellis, Phillip Reed, Onslow Stevens and Dorothy Burgess. The film was released on May 1, 1934, by Universal Pictures.

== Plot ==
The gentleman of the title is Victor Gresham, a popular novelist. He has loved many women, and has been loved back by many of them. Several of these ladies have left the domestic security provided by their husbands in order to further pursue a relationship with Gresham, despite Gresham's own advise to the contrary. As his lovers compete over him, Gresham uses his love life as inspiration for a series of cynical novels. Each of his novels described the events of one of his love affairs.

Early in the film, Gresham is found dead at his own writing desk. The rest of the film explores the events which led to his death, covering the last twelve hours in Gresham's life. Gresham dies in New York City, while working on his latest novel, called Frailty. There is a note with Gresham's signature nearby, which suggests that the novelist committed suicide. However, Inspector Quillan, who investigates the death, suspects murder to be more likely. Gresham's former lovers are now suspects and six of these women are found to have been present at Gresham's apartment, the night before his death.

The circumstances of their presence are soon explained. One of the women, Carlotta Barbe, had organized a surprise party for Gresham. She invited the Muses of Gresham's novels to attend. Gail Melville attended the party to officially end her relationship with Gresham, before marrying her fiancé. Gladys Durland had been Gresham's lover for two years, and attended the party to explain her plans to finally leave her husband. Foxey Dennison is also married, but still wanted to have an affair with Gresham. Nan Fitzerald was the inspiration for Gresham's first novel and wanted to see him again. The sixth woman at the party, Jean Sinclair, was apparently never Gresham's lover. Sinclair is a female illustrator, and her relationship with him was professional. She hoped to illustrate Frailty, once the novel was finished. She arrived at the party with Carter Vaughan, her boyfriend.

The events following the party are depicted in flashback. All the guests leave for the night, except for Fitzgerald who is drunk and sleeping. She spends the night at the couch of Gresham's apartment. The following morning, Gresham has yet to decide on an ending for his novel. He discusses the matter with Fletcher, his valet, and asks Fletcher to think of an ending. Fitzgerald wakes with a hangover and Gresham instructs her to get some proper sleep in his apartment. He soon discovers that there is a handgun hidden in her purse. Meanwhile, the morning newspaper reports the death of actress Peggy Fanning. Fanning was Gresham's latest lover and the inspiration for Frailty. She had divorced her husband, a fellow actor, in hopes of marrying Gresham. However, Gresham rejected her and had no interest in marrying her. The newspaper reports that Fanning committed suicide in Paris.

The flashback continues. Durland visits Gresham to warn him of danger. Her husband has read Gresham's novel about her and recognized his wife in it, due to a "detailed description of her sexual idiosyncrasies". Her husband wants to kill Gresham, and Durland tries to convince Gresham to flee with her to escape his wrath. Gresham rejects her offer and her love. He is no longer interested in her. Gresham is next visited by Barbe, who tries to renew her love affair with him. He rejects her and throws her out of his apartment. The next arrival is Sinclair, eager to show her sketches to Fletcher and get an agreement about the illustration of Frailty. Gresham hires her for the illustration of the novel, though he has another motive for the act. He has fallen in love with Sinclair and hopes to pursue a relationship with her.

Lyn Durland, Gladys' husband, arrives and threatens to kill Gresham. Sinclair manages to convince the furious Lyn that Gresham is her own lover, and that they are going to marry. Lyn leaves, and the supposed couple embraces. There is a genuine attraction, but Sinclair does not trust Gresham. She flees the apartment, unwilling to become the topic of his next novel. Fitzgerald witnesses the scene and realizes that Gresham has fallen in love with another woman. She decides to leave him, and leave the United States for good. Gresham does not protest, but offers to purchase her handgun first. He is now the owner of the weapon.

Trying to finish the novel, Gresham has the idea to end it with a suicide. He discusses the matter with Fletcher, and the conversation turns into the matter of suicide in general. Fletcher informs his employer about Fanning's suicide in Paris, and accuses Gresham of having killed the woman. Fletcher then has a confession for Gresham. He is not a valet, but an actor. "Fletcher" is the husband which Fanning cheated on and deserted. He entered Gresham's service in order to get close to him and plot his revenge. Following his confession, "Fletcher" kills Gresham. Gresham finally has an ending for his novel. But he is dead and can not write it down.

== Cast ==
- Paul Lukas as Victor Gresham
- Leila Hyams as Gladys Durland
- Patricia Ellis as Jean Sinclair
- Phillip Reed as Carter Vaughn
- Onslow Stevens as Lyn Durland
- Dorothy Burgess as Nan Fitzgerald
- Lilian Bond as Carlotta Barbe
- Joyce Compton as Foxey Dennison
- Murray Kinnell as Fletcher
- Dorothy Libaire as Gail Melville
- Richard Carle as Paul Q. Bindar
- Sara Haden as Frances Bennett
- Charles C. Wilson as Inspector Quillan

== Production ==
According to the American Film Institute, the film is an adaptation of the theatrical play Women (1928), also known as Women in His Life. The play was co-written by Edward Ellis and Edith Ellis.

The exterior scenes of New York City used in this film, were filmed in Fifth Avenue and Madison Square in Manhattan.

The American Film Institute has noted an error in the copyright records of this film. The records name the director as "Edward" L. Marin. His actual name was Edwin L. Marin.

== Reception ==
A 1934 review of the film by The New York Times noted several perceived flaws in it. Gresham and his female lovers spend much of the film exchanging "leaden-footed dialogue". Lead actor Paul Lukas gives "a tired and listless performance". The story of the film is dull and trivial. The same review considered the film inferior to the short film released alongside it, The Glory of the Kill (1934). The other film was a negative depiction of big-game hunting, with a would-be sportsman killing wild animals for fun.

Due to certain plot elements deemed objectionable by the Catholic Church, the film was publicly condemned as "immoral and indecent" in July 1934 by the National Legion of Decency.
