= The Spider (1931 film) =

1931 film

- Directed by: Kenneth MacKenna; William Cameron Menzies
- Screenplay by: Barry Conners; Philip Klein; Leon Gordon
- Based on: The Spider by Fulton Oursler and Lowell Brentano
- Produced by: William Sistrom
- Starring: Edmund Lowe; Lois Moran; El Brendel; John Arledge; George E. Stone; Earle Foxe
- Cinematography: James Wong Howe
- Edited by: Alfred DeGaetano
- Production company: Fox Film Corporation
- Distributed by: Fox Film Corporation
- Release date: September 27, 1931
- Running time: 59 minutes
- Country: United States
- Language: English

The Spider is a 1931 American pre-Code mystery film directed by Kenneth MacKenna and William Cameron Menzies and starring Edmund Lowe, Lois Moran, El Brendel and John Arledge. It was released on September 27, 1931, by Fox Film Corporation. It was based on the 1927 play The Spider by Fulton Oursler and Lowell Brentano.

== Plot ==
A celebrated magician Chatrand the Great announces at the end of a performance in a radio broadcast that he is searching for the real identity of his assistant, a victim of amnesia who apparently lost his memory after suffering a head wound two years earlier. Beverly Lane answers the appeal, as she believes the man in is her brother. A murder soon follows.

== Cast ==
- Edmund Lowe as Chatrand
- Lois Moran as Beverly Lane
- El Brendel as Ole
- John Arledge as Tommy
- George E. Stone as Dr. Blackstone
- Earle Foxe as John Carrington
- Manya Roberti as Estelle
- Howard Phillips as Alexander
- Purnell Pratt as Inspector Riley
- Jesse De Vorska as Goldberg
- Kendall McComas as The Kid
- Ruth Donnelly as Mrs. Wimbledon
