= My Lips Betray =

1933 film by John G. Blystone

- Directed by: John G. Blystone
- Written by: Attila Orbók (play); Jacques Natanson (play); Jane Storm; S.N. Behrman; Hanns Kräly
- Starring: Lilian Harvey; John Boles; El Brendel
- Cinematography: Lee Garmes
- Edited by: Alex Troffey
- Music by: Hugo Friedhofer
- Production company: Fox Film Corporation
- Distributed by: Fox Film Corporation
- Release date: November 4, 1933
- Running time: 76 minutes
- Country: United States
- Language: English

My Lips Betray is a 1933 American pre-Code musical comedy film directed by John G. Blystone and starring Lilian Harvey, John Boles and El Brendel. The film's sets were designed by the art director Joseph C. Wright.

== Plot ==
In a fictional, Central European kingdom, a vivacious but dimwitted young lady works as a singer in a beer garden for her lease cash. In the meantime, the ruler is confronting bankruptcy for his small country, unless he weds a wealthy, but undesirable ruler of another Central European territory. Eventually he takes in the struggling young singer, and they fall in love, despite possible bankruptcy and ruin.

== Cast ==
- Lilian Harvey as Lili Wieler
- John Boles as King Rupert aka Captain von Linden
- El Brendel as Oswald Stigmat, Chauffeur
- Irene Browne as Queen Mother Therese
- Maude Eburne as Mamma Watscheck
- Henry Stephenson as De Conti
- Herman Bing as Weininger
- Frank Atkinson as Baptiste, Royal Valet
- Robert Barrat as Undetermined Role (uncredited)
- Tyler Brooke as Radio Announcer (uncredited)
- Albert Conti as Auto Salesman (uncredited)
- Wild Bill Elliott as Auto Showroom Spectator (uncredited)
- Bess Flowers as Dressmaker (uncredited)
- Vera Lewis as Gossipy Woman in Curlers (uncredited)
- Bull Montana as Hamlet (uncredited)
- Paul Panzer as Beer Garden Patron (uncredited)
- Dewey Robinson as Joseph Stein, Theatrical Agent (uncredited)
- Dorothy Vernon as Beer Garden Patron (uncredited)

== Preservation ==
A restored version was shown at the 2019 UCLA Festival of Preservation.

== Bibliography ==
- Solomon, Aubrey. The Fox Film Corporation, 1915-1935. A History and Filmography. McFarland & Co, 2011.
