= Bachelor's Affairs =

1932 film

- Film poster
- Directed by: Alfred L. Werker
- Written by: James Forbes (play); Barry Conners; Philip Klein
- Produced by: Edmund Grainger
- Starring: Adolphe Menjou; Minna Gombell; Joan Marsh; Alan Dinehart; Irene Purcell; Herbert Mundin; Don Alvarado; Rita La Roy
- Cinematography: Norbert Brodine
- Edited by: Alfred DeGaetano
- Music by: R.H. Bassett
- Production company: Fox Film Corporation
- Distributed by: Fox Film Corporation
- Release date: June 26, 1932
- Running time: 1h 16m
- Country: United States
- Language: English

Bachelor's Affairs, also known as Fancy Free, is a 1932 American Pre-Code film based on the play "Precious" by James Forbes. While its availability for viewing is currently limited, it has been preserved by the UCLA Film and Television Archive.
