= Riders of the Purple Sage (1931 film) =

1931 film by Hamilton MacFadden

- Directed by: Hamilton MacFadden
- Written by: Philip Klein; John F. Goodrich; Barry Conners
- Based on: Riders of the Purple Sage by Zane Grey
- Produced by: Edmund Grainger
- Starring: George O'Brien; Marguerite Churchill; Noah Beery
- Cinematography: George Schneiderman
- Edited by: Alfred DeGaetano
- Production company: Fox Film
- Distributed by: Fox Film
- Release date: October 28, 1931
- Running time: 58 minutes
- Country: United States
- Language: English

Riders of the Purple Sage is a 1931 American pre-Code Western film based upon the 1912 novel by Zane Grey, directed by Hamilton MacFadden, photographed by George Schneiderman, and starring George O'Brien and Marguerite Churchill. The picture was released by the Fox Film Corporation with a running time of 58 minutes and remains the third of five screen versions. It was the first sound version. The movie was followed later the same year by a similar adaptation of the novel's sequel, The Rainbow Trail, also starring O'Brien.

== Cast ==
- George O'Brien as Jim Lassiter
- Marguerite Churchill as Jane Withersteen
- Noah Beery as Judge Dyer
- Yvonne Pelletier as Bess
- James Todd as Vern Venters
- Stanley Fields as Oldring
- Lester Dorr as Judkins
- Shirley Nail as Fay Larkin
- Frank McGlynn Jr. as Adam Tull, Gang leader
- Cliff Lyons as Jed
