= Three Girls Lost =

1931 film

- Theatrical release poster
- Directed by: Sidney Lanfield
- Screenplay by: Bradley King
- Story by: Robert Hardy Andrews
- Produced by: Sidney Lanfield
- Starring: John Wayne; Lew Cody; Loretta Young; Joyce Compton; Joan Marsh; Kathrin Clare Ward; Paul Fix; Bert Roach
- Cinematography: L. William O'Connell
- Edited by: Ralph Dietrich
- Music by: R. H. Bassett
- Distributed by: Fox Film Corporation
- Release date: April 19, 1931 (US)
- Running time: 55 minutes
- Country: United States
- Language: English

Three Girls Lost is a 1931 American Pre-Code drama film directed by Sidney Lanfield and starring Loretta Young, Lew Cody, and John Wayne. The film also featured Ward Bond (in a small unbilled role), and co-starred Wayne with Paul Fix for the first time. Based on a story by Robert Hardy Andrews, the film is about a young man (Wayne) who finds himself suspected of involvement in the murder of a gangster. The film was considered a lost film until the UCLA Film & Television Archive announced that they had a copy with 1 reel missing.

== Plot ==
Architect Gordon Wales finds his pretty young neighbor Marcia Tallant locked out of her apartment and flirts with her. He later is instrumental in getting her a job working for a gangster named William Marriott. When Marriott is murdered, suspicion falls on Wales after the police come to believe he was jealous of Marriott's relationship with Marcia. Unbeknownst to the police however, Wales had actually found himself attracted to Marcia's roommate Norene. When Wales is accused of murder, Norene uses her influence to obtain legal aid for him.

== Cast ==
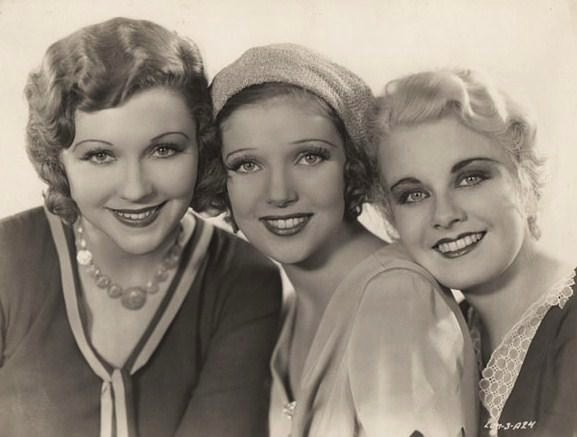
Joyce Compton, Loretta Young and Joan Marsh in Three Girls Lost

- Loretta Young as Norene McMann
- Lew Cody as William (Jack) Marriott
- John Wayne as Gordon Wales
- Joan Marsh as Marcia Tallant
- Joyce Compton as Edna Best
- George Beranger as Andre
- Ward Bond as Airline Steward (unbilled)
- Paul Fix as Tony Halcomb
- Willie Fung as Chinese Headwaiter
- Tenen Holtz as Photographer
- Hank Mann as Taxicab Driver
- Robert Emmett O'Connor as Detective
