= John G. Blystone =

American film director

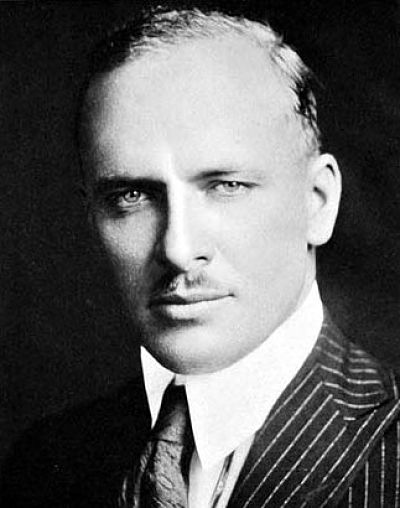
- Blystone in 1924
- Born: December 2, 1892; Rice Lake, Wisconsin
- Died: August 6, 1938 (aged 45); Los Angeles, California
- Occupation: Film director
- Years active: 1915-1938
- Relatives: Stanley Blystone (brother)

John Gilman Blystone (December 2, 1892 – August 6, 1938) was an American film director. He directed 100 films between 1915 and 1938, his last films being two Laurel and Hardy feature length comedies, the second of which (Block-Heads) was released 13 days after his death from a heart attack, aged 45. His grave is located at Valhalla Memorial Park Cemetery.

== Selected filmography ==
- A Friendly Husband (1923)
- Soft Boiled (1923)
- Our Hospitality (1923)
- Ladies to Board (1924)
- The Last Man on Earth (1924)
- Oh, You Tony! (1924)
- Teeth (1924)
- The Everlasting Whisper (1925)
- The Lucky Horseshoe (1925)
- Dick Turpin (1925)
- The Best Bad Man (1925)
- My Own Pal (1926)
- The Family Upstairs (1926)
- Hard Boiled (1926)
- Wings of the Storm (1926)
- Ankles Preferred (1927)
- Slaves of Beauty (1927)
- Pajamas (1927)
- Sharp Shooters (1928)
- Mother Knows Best (1928)
- Captain Lash (1929)
- The Sky Hawk (1929)
- Thru Different Eyes (1929)
- The Big Party (1930)
- So This Is London (1930)
- Tol'able David (1930)
- Men on Call (1931)
- Mr. Lemon of Orange (1931)
- Charlie Chan's Chance (1932)
- She Wanted a Millionaire (1932)
- Amateur Daddy (1932)
- Too Busy to Work (1932)
- The Painted Woman (1932)
- Hot Pepper (1933)
- My Lips Betray (1933)
- Coming Out Party (1934)
- Change of Heart (1934)
- Hell in the Heavens (1934)
- Bad Boy (1935)
- The County Chairman (1935)
- Gentle Julia (1936)
- The Magnificent Brute (1936)
- Little Miss Nobody (1936)
- Great Guy (1936)
- Music for Madame (1937)
- Woman Chases Man (1937)
- Swiss Miss (1938)
- Block-Heads (1938)
