= Edmund Grainger =

American film producer

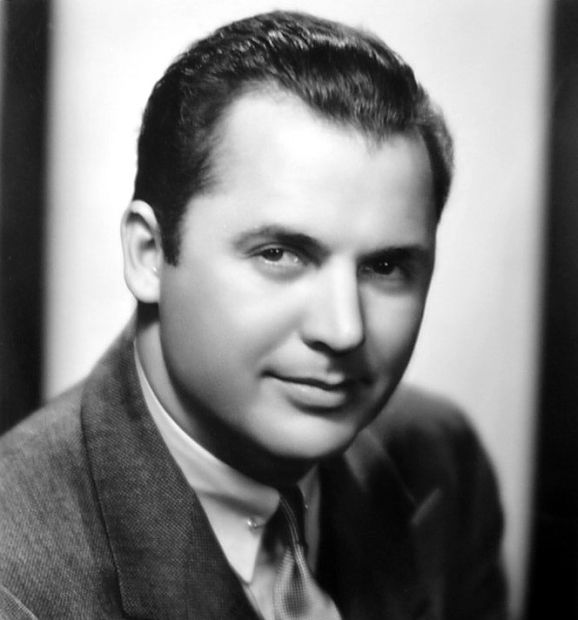
- Grainger circa 1940
- Born: October 1, 1906; New York, New York, U.S.
- Died: July 6, 1981 (aged 74); Beverly Hills, California, U.S.
- Other name: James Edmund Grainger
- Occupation: Film producer
- Years active: 1927–1976 (film)

Edmund Grainger (October 1, 1906 – July 6, 1981) was an American film producer. He produced more than 60 films during his career and also occasionally worked as an assistant director. During the 1930s, he was employed by Universal Pictures. He worked for RKO Radio Pictures during Howard Hughes' tenure as the studio's owner.

Grainger was the son of James D. Grainger, a film executive who had worked for a variety of companies beginning in the silent-film era.

== Selected filmography ==
- Riders of the Purple Sage (1931)
- Bachelor's Affairs (1932)
- Affairs of a Gentleman (1934)
- Half a Sinner (1934)
- The Great Impersonation (1935)
- It Happened in New York (1935)
- Diamond Jim (1935)
- The Mystery of Edwin Drood (1935)
- The Magnificent Brute (1936)
- Flying Hostess (1936)
- Sutter's Gold (1936)
- Breezing Home (1937)
- The Crime of Doctor Hallet (1938)
- The Nurse from Brooklyn (1938)
- Wives Under Suspicion (1938)
- Service de Luxe (1938)
- The Forgotten Woman (1939)
- The House of Fear (1939)
- Lady with Red Hair (1940)
- Flight Angels (1940)
- Tugboat Annie Sails Again (1940)
- The Man Who Talked Too Much (1940)
- Flight from Destiny (1941)
- Highway West (1941)
- Knockout (1941)
- Steel Against the Sky (1941)
- The Smiling Ghost (1941)
- Thieves Fall Out (1941)
- Wild Bill Hickok Rides (1942)
- Flying Tigers (1942)
- The Fabulous Texan (1947)
- Wake of the Red Witch (1948)
- Sands of Iwo Jima (1949)
- Flying Leathernecks (1951)
- The Racket (1951)
- One Minute to Zero (1952)
- Blackbeard the Pirate (1952)
- The French Line (1953)
- Split Second (1953)
- Devil's Canyon (1953)
- Second Chance (1953)
- The Treasure of Pancho Villa (1955)
- Great Day in the Morning (1956)
- Bundle of Joy (1956)
- Torpedo Run (1958)
- The Sheepman (1958)
- Never So Few (1959)
- Green Mansions (1959)
- Home from the Hill (1960)
- Cimarron (1960)
- A Matter of Time (1976)

== Bibliography ==
- Jewell, Richard B. Slow Fade to Black: The Decline of RKO Radio Pictures. University of California Press, 2016.
- Lombardi, Frederic . Allan Dwan and the Rise and Decline of the Hollywood Studios. McFarland, 2013.
