= Alfred DeGaetano =

American film editor

- Born: December 6, 1894; New York, New York; United States
- Died: May 3, 1958 (aged 63); Los Angeles, California; United States
- Other name: Al De Gaetano
- Occupation: Editor
- Years active: 1916–1957 (film)

Alfred DeGaetano (December 6, 1894 – May 3, 1958) was an American film and television editor. He worked for many years for 20th Century Fox, and was later employed by the Anglo-American Eagle-Lion Films during the late 1940s. From 1953 onwards he worked exclusively in television, editing a number of episodes for different shows.

== Partial filmography ==
- Love and Hate (1916)
- Love Aflame (1917)
- Heart Trouble (1928)
- The Chaser (1928)
- Oh, For a Man! (1930)
- Charlie Chan Carries On (1931)
- The Black Camel (1931)
- Riders of the Purple Sage (1931)
- Murder in Trinidad (1934)
- Under the Pampas Moon (1935)
- Charlie Chan in Egypt (1935)
- Little Miss Nobody (1936)
- Ramona (1936)
- Midnight Taxi (1937)
- The Lady Escapes (1937)
- Charlie Chan on Broadway (1937)
- Dangerously Yours (1937)
- Scotland Yard (1941)
- Private Nurse (1941)
- Great Guns (1941)
- Lost Honeymoon (1947)
- Stepchild (1947)
- Gas House Kids in Hollywood (1947)
- Raw Deal (1948)
- Man from Texas (1948)
- In This Corner (1948)
- He Walked by Night (1948)

== Bibliography ==
- Aubrey Solomon. The Fox Film Corporation, 1915–1935: A History and Filmography. McFarland, 2011.
