= Philip Klein (screenwriter) =

American screenwriter

- Born: April 24, 1889; New York, New York; United States
- Died: June 8, 1935 (aged 46); Los Angeles, California; United States
- Occupations: Actor, Writer
- Years active: 1926–1935 (film)

Philip Klein (April 24, 1889 – June 8, 1935) was an American screenwriter. He worked on around forty films during his career in both the silent and sound eras. He was the son of the British playwright Charles Klein.

== Selected filmography ==
- The Social Highwayman (1926)
- Is Zat So? (1927)
- Don't Marry (1928)
- Charlie Chan Carries On (1931)
- The Spider (1931)
- There Were Thirteen (1931)
- Riders of the Purple Sage (1931)

== Bibliography ==
- Aubrey Solomon. The Fox Film Corporation, 1915-1935: A History and Filmography. McFarland, 2011.
