= Gun Smoke (1931 film) =

1931 film

- Theatrical release poster
- Directed by: Edward Sloman
- Screenplay by: Grover Jones; William Slavens McNutt
- Starring: Richard Arlen; Mary Brian; Eugene Pallette; William "Stage" Boyd
- Cinematography: Archie Stout
- Production company: Paramount Pictures
- Distributed by: Paramount Pictures
- Release date: April 11, 1931
- Running time: 71 minutes
- Country: United States
- Language: English

Gun Smoke is a 1931 American pre-Code Western film directed by Edward Sloman and written by Grover Jones and William Slavens McNutt. The film stars Richard Arlen, Mary Brian, Eugene Pallette, and William "Stage" Boyd. The film was released on April 11, 1931, by Paramount Pictures.

== Plot ==
Following a killing and robbery in a big city back east, gang leader Kedge Darvas and some of his henchies take a train to a small western town in Idaho, with intentions of hiding out there until things cool down back in Chi or NYC, or wherever they lammed from. They are welcomed with open arms by the citizens under the impression they are there as capital investors with money to spend. Before long, Darvas figures the town is ripe for the taking and sends word for reinforcements, and each arriving train unloads a few suits and snappy-brim hats. Then they get rough, kill Sheriff Posey Meed and rile up the citizens, led by cowhand Brad Farley, who had Darvas spotted for a wrong number just by the way he made moves on Sue Vancey.

== Cast ==
- Richard Arlen as Brad Farley
- Mary Brian as Sue Vancey
- William "Stage" Boyd as Kedge Darvis
- Eugene Pallette as Stub Wallack
- Charles Winninger as Tack Gillup
- Louise Fazenda as Hampsey Dell
- Brooks Benedict as Spot Skee
- William Arnold as Mugs Maransa
- J. Carrol Naish as Mink Gordon
- Stanley Mack as Jazzy Quinn
- Guy Oliver as Sheriff Posey Meed
- James Durkin as J.K. Horton
- William V. Mong as 'Strike' Jackson
- Anne Shirley as Horton's Daughter
- Willie Fung as Wong
