= Ruth Warburton =

Ruth Warburton may refer to:

- Ruth Selwyn, American actress
- Ruth Ware, British author
