= Nicholas Schenck =

American film studio executive (1880–1969)

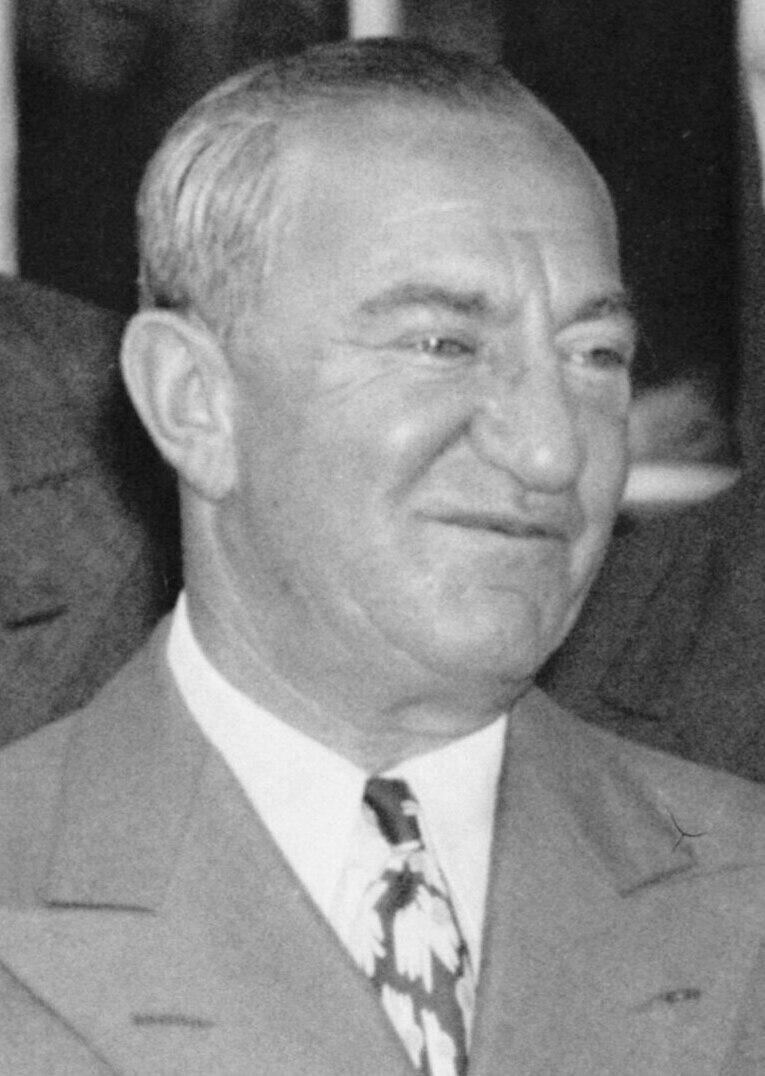
- Born: November 14, 1880; Rybinsk, Yaroslavl Governorate, Russian Empire
- Died: March 4, 1969 (aged 88); Florida, U.S.
- Occupation: Film studio executive
- Relatives: Joseph M. Schenck (brother); Ruth Selwyn (sister-in-law); Fred M. Wilcox (brother-in-law)

Nicholas M. Schenck (Russian: Николай Михайлович Шейнкер) (November 14, 1880, Rybinsk, Russia – March 4, 1969, Florida, U.S.) was a Russian-American film studio executive and businessman.

== Biography ==
=== Early life ===
One of seven children, Schenck was born to a Jewish household in Rybinsk, a town on the Volga River in the Yaroslavl Governorate of Tsarist Russia. With his parents, he and his brothers, George and Joseph, emigrated to the United States in 1892 where they settled in a tenement on New York's Lower East Side. Subsequently, he relocated to Harlem, the population of which at that time consisted primarily of Jewish and Italian immigrants.

Upon his arrival in the United States, he and his older brother Joseph worked as a team running errands and selling newspapers while studying at the New York College of Pharmacy at night.

They subsequently began working in a drugstore in the Bowery. Within two years they had saved up enough money to buy out the drugstore's owner and opened another store on Third Avenue at 110th Street and began casting about for other business ventures.

=== Career ===
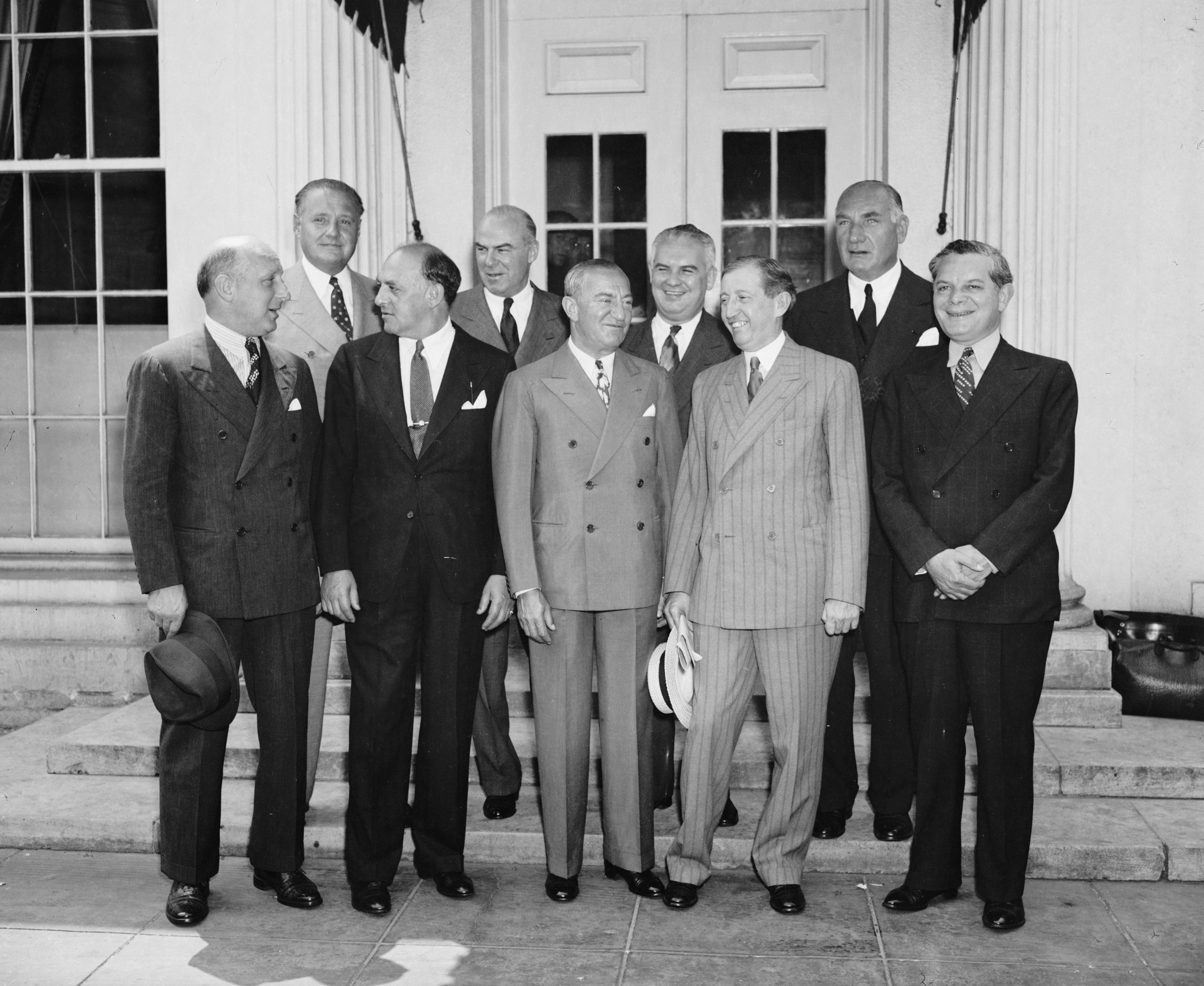
At the White House, front row, left to right: Barney Balaban, Paramount; Harry Cohn, Columbia Pictures; Nicholas M. Schenck, Loew's; Will H. Hays; Leo Spitz, RKO. Back row, left to right: Sidney Kent, 20th Century Fox; N.J. Blumberg, Universal; Albert Warner, Warner Bros., in 1938

One summer day, the Schencks took a trolley ride to Fort George Amusement Park, in uptown Manhattan, and noticed that thousands of people were milling around idly waiting for the return trains. The brothers rented a beer concession and also provided some vaudeville entertainment. It was at this time that the Schencks made the acquaintance of Marcus Loew, a theater operator. Loew persuaded them to buy two film theaters and the brothers started to work with Loew in the theater business. Between approximately 1907 and 1919, they reinvested in real estate for nickelodeons, vaudeville, and eventually motion pictures.

In 1910, the Schencks' theaters were grouped into Loew's Consolidated Enterprises. Loew, having noted the brothers' success, advanced them capital, permitting them to purchase Palisades Amusement Park in Bergen County, New Jersey, directly across the river from Manhattan, in 1910. It remained in operation until 1971, although the brothers sold their interest in 1934.

Schenck eventually became Loew's right-hand man, helping him manage what rapidly grew into a vast theater chain. In 1919, Schenck was named as vice president and general manager of Loew's Inc.

Joseph relocated to Hollywood, eventually becoming president of United Artists Corporation. He helped shepherd Loew's acquisition of Metro Pictures in 1920 and Goldwyn Pictures in 1924 to keep the theaters supplied with product.

Loew soon realized he needed someone in Hollywood to run his studio interests. Schenck seemed the obvious choice, but Loew concluded that he needed Schenck in New York to help run the theaters. He bought a studio headed by independent producer Louis B. Mayer in 1924, merging the Loew's Hollywood interests into Metro-Goldwyn-Mayer with Mayer as studio chief. For reasons that remain unknown, Mayer and Schenck disliked each other intensely; Mayer reportedly called Schenck "Mr. Skunk" in private. It was the start of a testy relationship that would last for almost four decades.

In 1927, Marcus Loew died suddenly, leaving control of Loew's to Schenck. In 1929, William Fox, head of rival studio Fox Film Corporation, arranged to buy controlling interest from Schenck. When Mayer found out about the sale, he was outraged; although he was a Loew's vice president, he was not a shareholder and had no say in the deal. Mayer went to the Justice Department and, through his political connections, managed to get the deal stalled on antitrust grounds.

Shortly afterward, in the summer of 1929, Fox was seriously injured in a car accident. By the time he had recovered, the stock market crash had nearly wiped out his fortune. Schenck blamed Mayer for costing him millions, and this made an already icy relationship even worse. However, due to the stock market crash, the Loew's–Fox deal would have been dead even if the Justice Department had given the deal its blessing.

By 1932, Schenck was running an entertainment empire that consisted of a thriving theater circuit and MGM. The conglomerate, which Schenck continued to manage closely from New York City, employed 12,000 people. Schenck, by demanding a tight production schedule, created tension with Mayer and Irving Thalberg, who was production chief until his early death in 1936. Nonetheless, thanks to Schenck's stringent management, MGM was successful, becoming the only film company that continued to pay dividends during the Great Depression.

Under Schenck's leadership, the studio produced a great quantity of films, and the studio system allowed it to retain a wide array of talent under its roof: Lon Chaney, Joan Crawford, Greta Garbo, Jean Harlow, Wallace Beery, Clark Gable, Mickey Rooney, Spencer Tracy, Katharine Hepburn, Judy Garland, Robert Taylor, the Jeanette MacDonald–Nelson Eddy team and many others. Schenck's adroit business sense made him a wealthy man. In 1927, he and Joseph were reported to be worth about $20 million (approximately $500 million in today's money, possibly more), with a combined yearly income of at least a million. By some estimates, Nicholas Schenck was the eighth richest individual in the United States during the 1930s.

=== After World War II ===
Although Schenck's power and prestige were at their peak after World War II, times were changing, as television loomed on the horizon. Like many in the motion picture industry, however, Schenck adamantly refused to get involved with the new medium. In 1951, Louis B. Mayer had a falling out with Schenck over Dore Schary's position at MGM and Mayer was forced out of the studio.

By the middle of the decade, the price of MGM shares was sagging and stockholders were growing restive. On December 14, 1955, Arthur M. Loew, the son of Marcus Loew, succeeded Nicholas Schenck as the company's president, although Schenck remained chairman of the board. The following year, when Arthur Loew resigned for health reasons, Schenck defied the other directors in the efforts to secure a new president. When Joseph R. Vogel became president, Schenck was named honorary chairman, but retired altogether later that same year.

Nicholas Schenck divided his last years between his estates at Sands Point, Long Island, and Miami Beach. The former, which he had purchased in 1942, consisted of a 20-acre (81,000 m^{2}) property with a main house of 30 rooms, luxuriously appointed. It included a private movie theater and a 200-foot dock.

=== Personal life ===
Nicholas Schenck's first marriage ended in divorce. In 1927, he married socialite and former vaudeville entertainer Pansy Wilcox (1898–1987), whose brother was director Fred M. Wilcox. Her sister was actress Ruth Selwyn (1905–1954), wife of Edgar Selwyn.

Nicholas and Pansy had three daughters: Marti, who acted under the name Marti Stevens, Joanne (born August 1, 1932) and Nicola (born December 13, 1933, in New York). Nicola married actor Helmut Dantine; they had three children. She acted under the name Niki Dantine.

Schenck owned and raced Thoroughbred horses. His filly Cobul, who raced under his wife's name, won the 1958 Astoria Stakes.

=== Death ===
Schenck died following a stroke in Florida in 1969.
