= David Newell (actor, born 1905) =

American actor (1905-1980)

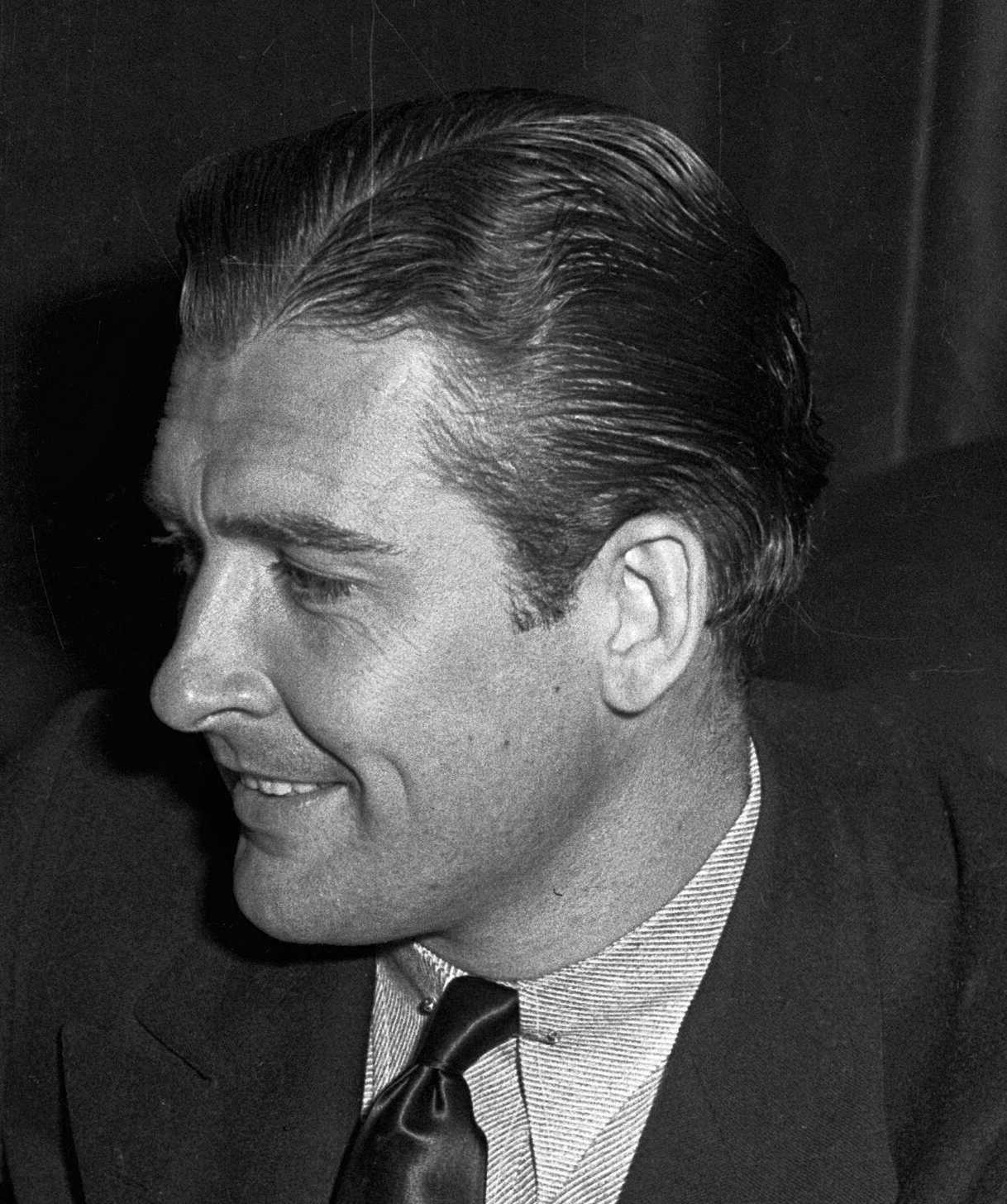
- Newell in 1935
- Born: January 23, 1905; Carthage, Missouri, United States
- Died: January 25, 1980 (aged 75); Los Angeles, California, United States
- Occupations: Actor, make-up artist
- Years active: 1929–1961

David Newell (January 23, 1905 – January 25, 1980) was primarily known as an American character actor, whose acting career spanned from the very beginning of the sound film era through the middle of the 1950s. He made his film debut in a featured role in The Hole in the Wall, a 1929 film starring Edward G. Robinson and Claudette Colbert.

== Career ==
Early in his career he had many featured roles, in such films as: RKO's The Runaway Bride in 1929, starring Mary Astor; 1931's Ten Cents a Dance, starring Barbara Stanwyck and directed by Lionel Barrymore; and White Heat in 1934. He would occasionally receive a starring role, as in 1930's Just Like Heaven, which co-starred Anita Louise. However, by the mid-1930s he was being relegated to mostly smaller supporting roles. Some of the more notable films he appeared in include: A Star is Born (1937), which stars Janet Gaynor and Fredric March; Blondie (1938); the Bette Davis vehicle, Dark Victory (1939); Day-Time Wife (1939), starring Tyrone Power and Linda Darnell; It's a Wonderful World (1939), with James Stewart and Claudette Colbert; Rings on Her Fingers (1942), starring Henry Fonda and Gene Tierney; the Danny Kaye and Dinah Shore film, Up in Arms (1944), which also stars Dana Andrews; Killer McCoy (1947) with Mickey Rooney, Brian Donlevy, and Ann Blyth; Homecoming (1948), starring Clark Gable, Lana Turner, and Anne Baxter; That Wonderful Urge (1949), starring Tyrone Power and Gene Tierney; David and Bathsheba (1951), starring Gregory Peck and Susan Hayward; and Cecil B. DeMille's 1952 blockbuster, The Greatest Show on Earth. During his 25-year acting career, he appeared in over 110 films. His final appearance in film was in 1954's The Eddie Cantor Story, in which he had a small supporting role.

In the late 1940s he also began working as a make-up artist, which he transitioned full-time to in 1955; this was due to injuries sustained during a car accident, which left him physically disfigured. He retired from the film industry in 1961, although he continued to work in television through the beginning of the 1970s, his last position being the make-up artist on the television show, Lassie.

Newell died two days past his 75th birthday, on January 25, 1980.

== Filmography ==
(Per AFI database)

=== Acting ===
- Dangerous Curves (1929)
- Darkened Rooms (1929)
- The Hole in the Wall (1929)
- The Marriage Playground (1929)
- The Kibitzer (1930)
- Just Like Heaven (1930)
- Let's Go Native (1930)
- Murder on the Roof (1930)
- Paramount on Parade (1930)
- The Runaway Bride (1930)
- The Flood (1931)
- Woman Hungry (1931)
- Ten Cents a Dance (1931)
- Divorce in the Family (1932)
- New Morals for Old (1932)
- A Woman Commands (1932)
- Hell Below (1933)
- Made on Broadway (1933)
- Ann Carver's Profession (1933)
- White Heat (1934)
- Sweet Adeline (1934)
- Desirable (1934)
- A Night at the Ritz (1935)
- So Red the Rose (1935)
- The Florentine Dagger (1935)
- Devil Dogs of the Air (1935)
- Ship Cafe (1935)
- The Goose and the Gander (1935)
- Living on Velvet (1935)
- Annapolis Farewell (1935)
- F-Man (1936)
- Career Woman (1936)
- The First Baby (1936)
- The Crime of Dr. Forbes (1936)
- Polo Joe (1936)
- 15 Maiden Lane (1936)
- Rose Bowl (1936)
- Educating Father (1936)
- Everybody's Old Man (1936)
- Waikiki Wedding (1937)
- The Holy Terror (1937)
- Wells Fargo (1937)
- A Star Is Born (1937)
- Artists and Models (1937)
- Hollywood Hotel (1937)
- This Way Please (1937)
- Submarine D-1 (1937)
- She Married an Artist (1937)
- Dangerous to Know (1938)
- Mr. Moto's Gamble (1938)
- Blondie (1938)
- Blondes at Work (1938)
- Heart of the North (1938)
- Three Loves Has Nancy (1938)
- Sergeant Murphy (1938)
- The Lady Objects (1938)
- Over the Wall (1938)
- Men with Wings (1938)
- The Escape (1939)
- Blondie Meets the Boss (1939)
- Dark Victory (1939)
- Swanee River (1939)
- It's a Wonderful World (1939)
- They All Come Out (1939)
- Day-Time Wife (1939)
- News Is Made at Night (1939)
- Boy Friend (1939)
- Union Pacific (1939)
- Rulers of the Sea (1939)
- Missing Evidence (1939)
- Blondie Has Servant Trouble (1940)
- Dr. Kildare's Crisis (1940)
- Phantom Raiders (1940)
- Murder in the Air (1940)
- Appointment for Love (1941)
- Dive Bomber (1941)
- Footsteps in the Dark (1941)
- Tanks a Million (1941)
- You're in the Army Now (1941)
- Beyond the Blue Horizon (1942)
- Rings on Her Fingers (1942)
- The Wife Takes a Flyer (1942)
- Destroyer (1943)
- Gangway for Tomorrow (1943)
- It's a Great Life (1943)
- Reveille with Beverly (1943)
- Government Girl (1944)
- Up in Arms (1944)
- A Guy Could Change (1946)
- Killer McCoy (1947)
- B.F.'s Daughter (1948)
- Homecoming (1948)
- My Girl Tisa (1948)
- A Southern Yankee (1948)
- Up in Central Park (1948)
- Act of Violence (1949)
- Command Decision (1949)
- That Wonderful Urge (1949)
- The Fighting O'Flynn (1949)
- Oh, You Beautiful Doll (1949)
- Jolson Sings Again (1950)
- Cargo to Capetown (1950)
- Kansas Raiders (1950)
- Love That Brute (1950)
- The Milkman (1950)
- David and Bathsheba (1951)
- The Fat Man (1951)
- No Questions Asked (1951)
- Street Bandits (1951)
- Weekend with Father (1951)
- Deadline – U.S.A. (1952)
- The Duel at Silver Creek (1952)
- The Greatest Show on Earth (1952)
- Invitation (1952)
- Love Is Better Than Ever (1952)
- Ma and Pa Kettle at the Fair (1952)
- Easy to Love (1953)
- The Mississippi Gambler (1953)
- The Eddie Cantor Story (1954)

=== Make-up artist ===
- Wild Weed (1949)
- Slaughter Trail (1951)
- Count the Hours (1953)
- Man of Conflict (1953)
- Sabre Jet (1953)
- The Flaming Urge (1953)
- Bait (1954)
- The Other Woman (1954)
- Private Hell 36 (1954)
- Mad at the World (1955)
- Edge of Hell (1956)
- The Great Locomotive Chase (1956)
- Westward Ho the Wagons! (1956)
- Johnny Tremain (1957)
- The Cry Baby Killer (1958)
- Machine-Gun Kelly (1958)
- Suicide Battalion (1958)
- Roadracers (1959)
- The Angry Red Planet (1960)
- The Phantom Planet (1961)
- Teenage Millionaire (1961)

=== Television (partial - only major participation) ===
- Dangerous Assignment - 1952
- The Hardy Boys: The Mystery of the Applegate Treasure - 1956
- The Dennis O'Keefe Show - 1959–60
- Lassie - 1965–71

(Television credits from imdb.com)
