= Baby Face Harrington =

1935 film by Raoul Walsh

- Theatrical release poster
- Directed by: Raoul Walsh
- Screenplay by: Nunnally Johnson; Edwin H. Knopf; Charles Lederer; Barry Trivers
- Based on: Something to Brag About; 1925 play by Edgar Selwyn; William LeBaron
- Produced by: Edgar Selwyn
- Starring: Charles Butterworth; Una Merkel; Harvey Stephens; Eugene Pallette; Nat Pendleton
- Cinematography: Oliver T. Marsh
- Edited by: William S. Gray
- Music by: Score: Paul Marquardt; Jack Virgil; Edward Ward; Sam Wineland; Songs: Burton Lane (music); Harold Adamson (lyrics)
- Production company: Metro-Goldwyn-Mayer
- Distributed by: Loew's Inc.
- Release date: April 12, 1935
- Running time: 62 minutes
- Country: United States
- Language: English

Baby Face Harrington is a 1935 American comedy-gangster film directed by Raoul Walsh and written by Nunnally Johnson, Edwin H. Knopf and Charles Lederer. The film stars Charles Butterworth, Una Merkel, Harvey Stephens, Eugene Pallette and Nat Pendleton. The film was released on April 12, 1935, by Metro-Goldwyn-Mayer.

== Plot ==
Millicent wants her husband Willie to make a success of himself, the way her old beau Ronald did. In the belief what she wants most is money, Willie cashes in a life-insurance policy in exchange for $2,000 in cash, which he promptly loses.

When he sees real-estate agent Skinner with that much money, not long after having spoken with him, Willie knows who's robbed him. Meanwhile, a professional thief, Rocky Banister, is terrifying everyone in town with his daring robberies, worrying Millicent so much that she keeps a gun nearby.

Borrowing the gun, Willie confronts Skinner and takes the $2,000. When he returns home, Willie discovers that his money has been in his wallet all along. Before he can return it to Skinner and apologize, Rocky breaks in and steals all $4,000.

Willie is accused of being an accomplice of Rocky's and sent to jail. During a breakout, Willie manages to leave a note behind for the police, who catch up just in time to apprehend Rocky and proclaim Willie a hero.

== Cast ==
- Charles Butterworth as Willie
- Una Merkel as Millicent
- Harvey Stephens as Ronald
- Eugene Pallette as Uncle Henry
- Nat Pendleton as Rocky
- Ruth Selwyn as Dorothy
- Donald Meek as Skinner
- Dorothy Libaire as Edith
- Edward Nugent as Albert
- Robert Livingston as George
- Stanley Fields as Mullens
- Raymond Brown as McGuire
- Wade Boteler as Glynn
- Bradley Page as Dave
- Richard Carle as Judge Forbes
- G. Pat Collins as Hank
- Claude Gillingwater as Colton
