= Eyes of Mystery =

Eyes of Mystery may refer to:

- The Eyes of Mystery, a 1918 American mystery film directed by Tod Browning
- Eyes of Mystery, an alternative title for Midnight Warning, an American film directed by Spencer Gordon Bennet
