= Murder by the Clock =

1931 film

- Directed by: Edward Sloman
- Screenplay by: Charles Behan
- Based on: Murder by the Clock by Rufus King and Dangerously Yours by Charles Behan
- Starring: William Boyd; Lilyan Tashman; Irving Pichel; Regis Toomey
- Cinematography: Karl Struss
- Production company: Paramount Publix Corp.
- Distributed by: Paramount Publix Corp.
- Release dates: July 13, 1931 (Paramount Theatre, New York); August 8, 1931 (United States)
- Country: United States
- Language: English

Murder by the Clock is a 1931 American pre-Code murder mystery film starring William "Stage" Boyd and Lilyan Tashman. The film is based on the novel of the same name by Rufus King and the play Dangerously Yours by Charles Beahan.

== Plot ==
When a wealthy woman dies, she is buried with a loud horn in her crypt due to her fear of premature burial. Before her will can be read, her heirs start to die mysteriously.

== Cast ==
- William "Stage" Boyd as Lt. Valcour
- Lilyan Tashman as Laura Endicott
- Irving Pichel as Philip Endicott
- Regis Toomey as Officer Cassidy
- Sally O'Neil as Jane
- Blanche Friderici as Julia Endicott
- Walter McGrail as Herbert Endicott
- Lester Vail as Thomas Hollander
- Martha Mattox as Miss Roberts
- Frank Sheridan as Chief of Police
- Guy Oliver as Watchman

== Production ==
In April 1931 during a sales convention in New Jersey, Paramount's vice-president Sidney R. Kent announced that that the studio would produce 65 to 70 feature films for their 1931-1932 program, including Murder by the Clock. The film was adapted by Barlett Cormack from both the novel Murder by the Clock by Rufus King which was published serially in Redbook magazine as "Double Murder" between January and May 1929 and Charles Behan's play Dangerously Yours (1929).

== Release ==
Paramount previewed Murder by the Block in Santa, Monica, California on July 1, 1931. A Critic from Motion Picture Daily reported that this early screening had the audience laughing at sequences that were meant to be serious and summarized the audience's reaction as "very mild."

Murder by the Clock was publicly shown first on July 17, 1931, at New York's Paramount Theatre. The film was released nationally by August 8, 1931. The film was banned by the British Board of Film Censors after a few performances at London's Plaza.

== Reception ==
From contemporary reviews, Hollywood Spectator generally praised the film as having "everything that should go into a good murder story [...] the result is a mystery picture above the average." A reviewer in Variety described the film as "a chiller, thriller and mystifier that will totally please audiences in whom rests appeal for this sort of things. No matter by whom played or cast."

The Variety review found that the cast was generally "amateurish" while both the trade paper and Film Daily praising Irving Pichel's role in the film, with the latter described as being "strikingly portrayed" and Variety proclaiming he "acts rings around everyone." New York Daily News commented that Edward Sloman did good work in direction while Variety described it as "sloppy".

From retrospective reviews, William K. Everson of Classics of the Horror Film (1974) described the film drew from the atmosphere of the then just-beginning cycle of horror films to "beef up the generally prosaic and talkative quality of mystery films." Everson complimented the plot and characters as "colorful", specifically highlighting stating that Lilyan Tashman "prevents it from being taken too seriously, but on the other hand, without her tongue-incheek villainy, it would all be a good deal less diverting"

== See also ==
- The House That Shadows Built, a 1931 promotional film by Paramount
