= The Runaway Bride (film) =

1930 film

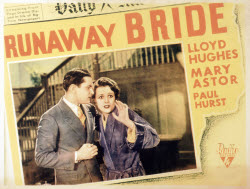
- Lobby card
- Directed by: Donald Crisp; James Anderson (uncredited assistant)
- Written by: Jane Murfin
- Based on: Cooking Her Goose; 1929 play by H. H. Van Loan; Lolita Ann Westman
- Produced by: William LeBaron
- Starring: Mary Astor; Lloyd Hughes
- Cinematography: Leo Tover
- Edited by: Archie F. Marshek
- Production companies: A Radio Picture; RKO Productions, Inc.
- Distributed by: RKO Productions, Inc.
- Release date: May 4, 1930 (US)
- Running time: 69 minutes
- Country: United States
- Language: English
- Budget: $103,000
- Box office: $204,000

The Runaway Bride is a 1930 American pre-Code crime film starring Mary Astor, Lloyd Hughes, and Paul Hurst. It was directed by Donald Crisp, from a screenplay by Jane Murfin, adapted from the play Cooking Her Goose by H. H. Van Loan and Lolita Ann Westman.

The film is preserved in the Library of Congress collection.

== Plot ==
Mary Gray and Dick Mercer elope, since Mary's wealthy parents would never approve of the marriage. In Atlantic City, they arrive at the humble efficiency hotel room Mary has taken. Dick is not impressed, and would prefer they stay in a fancier hotel. An argument ensues over whether Dick should remain an idle playboy or go to work. Mary decides to call it off, but Dick refuses to let her, locking her in the room while he goes for a minister.

Meanwhile, Red Dugan robs a jewelry store and slips into Mary's room (formerly his). Dugan hides a stolen necklace in Mary's handbag, before he and a policeman fatally shoot each other.

When Clara Muldoon, the chambermaid, comes to change the linen, Mary asks her for a hiding place, giving her $300. Clara is about to switch jobs, but gives Mary her new job information instead. After Mary leaves, Clara comes upon Dugan, who manages to tell her that he "put it in her bag" before dying. Police Sergeant Daly questions Clara, then accuses Dick of being Dugan's associate when he returns. Daly takes the pair in for further grilling.

As "Sally Fairchild", Mary shows up at the home of wealthy bachelor George Blaine to take the job. However, it is clear to George and his valet Williams that there is something not quite right about her. Her manners are too polished for a servant and she is very pretty. (George also notices that the monogram on her purse is MG.) George decides not to hire her, but when a policeman comes and asks for directions, she faints after the man leaves. Under the circumstances, George cannot send her away in that condition, so he decides to hire her after all. Afterward, George examines Mary's purse and finds a pearl necklace. Meanwhile, Clara, who is part of the gang, tells the thieves what she knows. Barney Black, their leader, decides to wait until things quieten down before retrieving the loot.

George sees a newspaper article about Mary Gray's elopement, along with a photo of her. He decides to discharge her, but he and Mary are attracted to each other, so she is able to make him change his mind again. Then Clara shows up and demands half of the proceeds of the necklace from Mary. Mary does not know what she is talking about, but offers to give her a valuable ring to go away. While Mary gets it, Clara finds and takes the necklace from her purse. After Clara leaves, Dick arrives (having paid Clara $500 for the information), followed by Sergeant Daly and then the crooks. The thieves abduct Mary. Daly, however, catches Clara when she tries to slip away by herself. She gives up the pearls in exchange for leniency. George drives off after Mary, but Barney shoots him in the shoulder and also his two front tires. The gang head to their hideout: a fake hospital. When George pulls into a garage, one of the men offers to drive him to the same hospital. George is tipped off when he sees that the doctor there has a pistol. He manages to rescue Mary, just before the police arrive to arrest the jewel thieves.

== Cast ==
- Mary Astor as Mary Gray / Sally Fairchild
- Lloyd Hughes as George Edward Blaine
- Paul Hurst as Sergeant Daly
- David Newell as Dick Mercer
- Natalie Moorhead as Clara Muldoon
- Edgar Norton as Williams
- Francis McDonald as Barney Black
- Maurice Black as 'Red' Dugan

== Notes ==
Although Donald Crisp was a seasoned director of dozens of silent films, this was the only sound film that he ever directed.

== Reception ==
The film made a profit of $15,000.
