= Brooks Benedict =

American actor

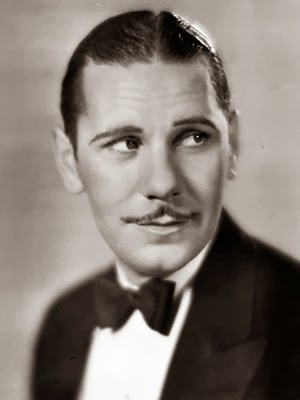
- Born: Harold Julian Mann; February 6, 1896; New York City, U.S.
- Died: January 1, 1968 (aged 71); Houston, Texas, U.S.
- Occupation: Actor
- Years active: 1923–1958

Brooks Benedict (born Harold Julian Mann, February 6, 1896 – January 1, 1968) was an American actor of the silent and sound film eras, when he played supporting and utility roles in over 300 films, mostly uncredited.

== Life ==
He was born to Alice Julian and Samuel Mann. He attended Princeton University for two years, and was a member of its football team.

He then joined the American Ambulance Corps in France for six months at the height of the First World War. Upon return and after the Selective Service Act of 1917, he enlisted and served as a private in the U.S. Army Air Service (632 Aero Sq., 144 Aero Sq., Sq. I Kelly Field, Sq. C Gerstner Field; Flying School Detachment).

Benedict then went to Hollywood and pursued different jobs until his starting role in William Wellman's movie Cupid's Fireman (1923) at Fox Film Corporation. His first major role came later opposite Harold Lloyd in The Freshman / College Days (1925) as the Campus Cad. He continued to appear with Lloyd and other prominent silent era stars in the 1920s During World War II and throughout the 1940s, he appeared in more than 130 movies, where he was limited to utility roles in all but three. During this time, in an interview published in the Prescott Evening Courier, he and Howard R. Philbrick (Chief Casting Executive) explain the challenges faced by some 7000 extras in 1940 Hollywood. In later stages of his career, he extended his work to television, appearing as a regular in such series as the Four Star Playhouse (1956). His last performance was in the movie Houseboat (1958).

As of 1940, he was married to Marjorie Benedict in Los Angeles.

Benedict died at 12:05 am January 1, 1968, in Bellaire General Hospital in Houston, Texas, due to myocardial infarction after a history of arteriosclerosis and rheumatic heart disease. He was interred at Houston National Cemetery two days later.

== Gallery ==
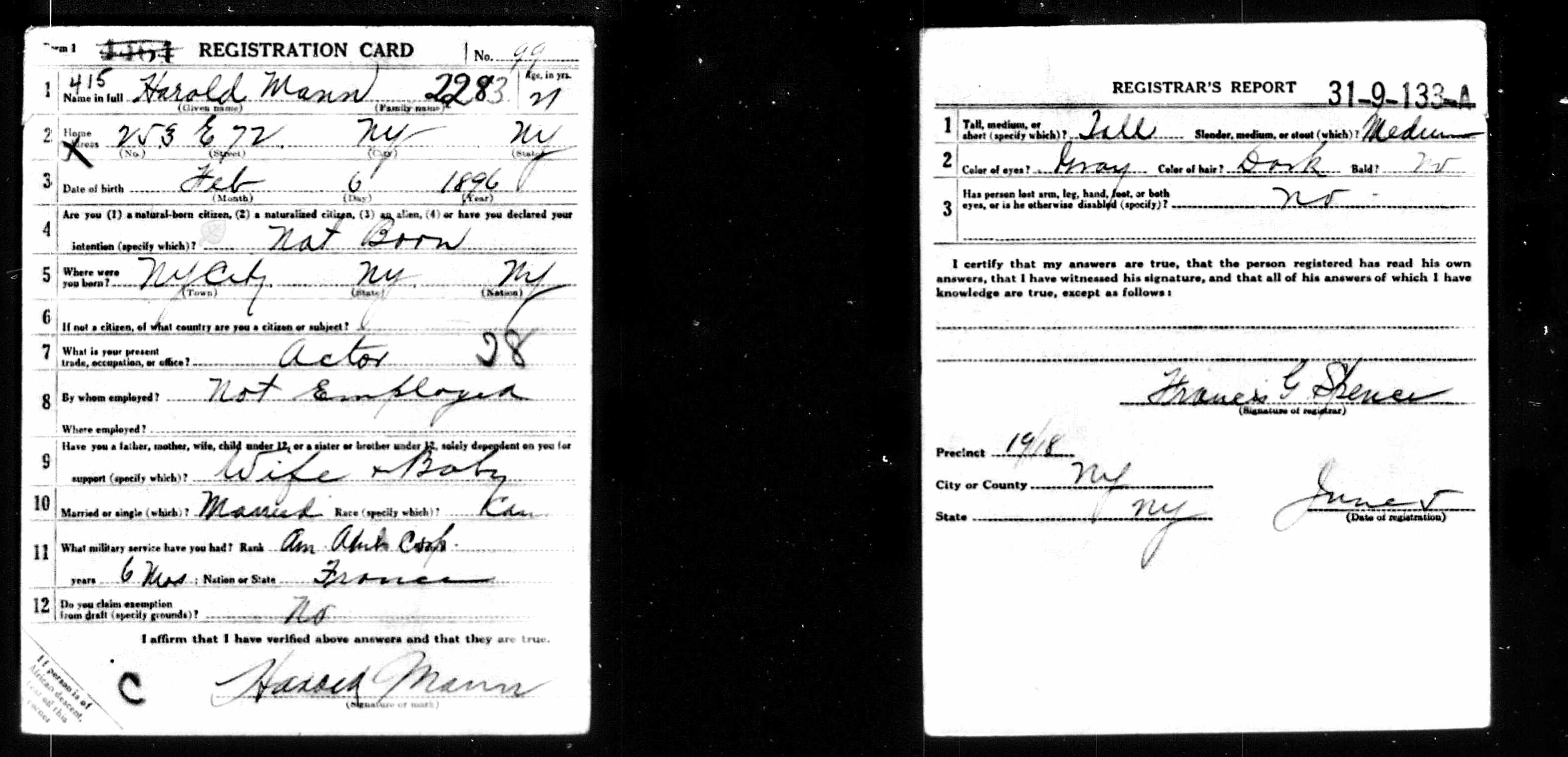
Harold J. Mann (Brooks Benedict) Army Registration Card 1917

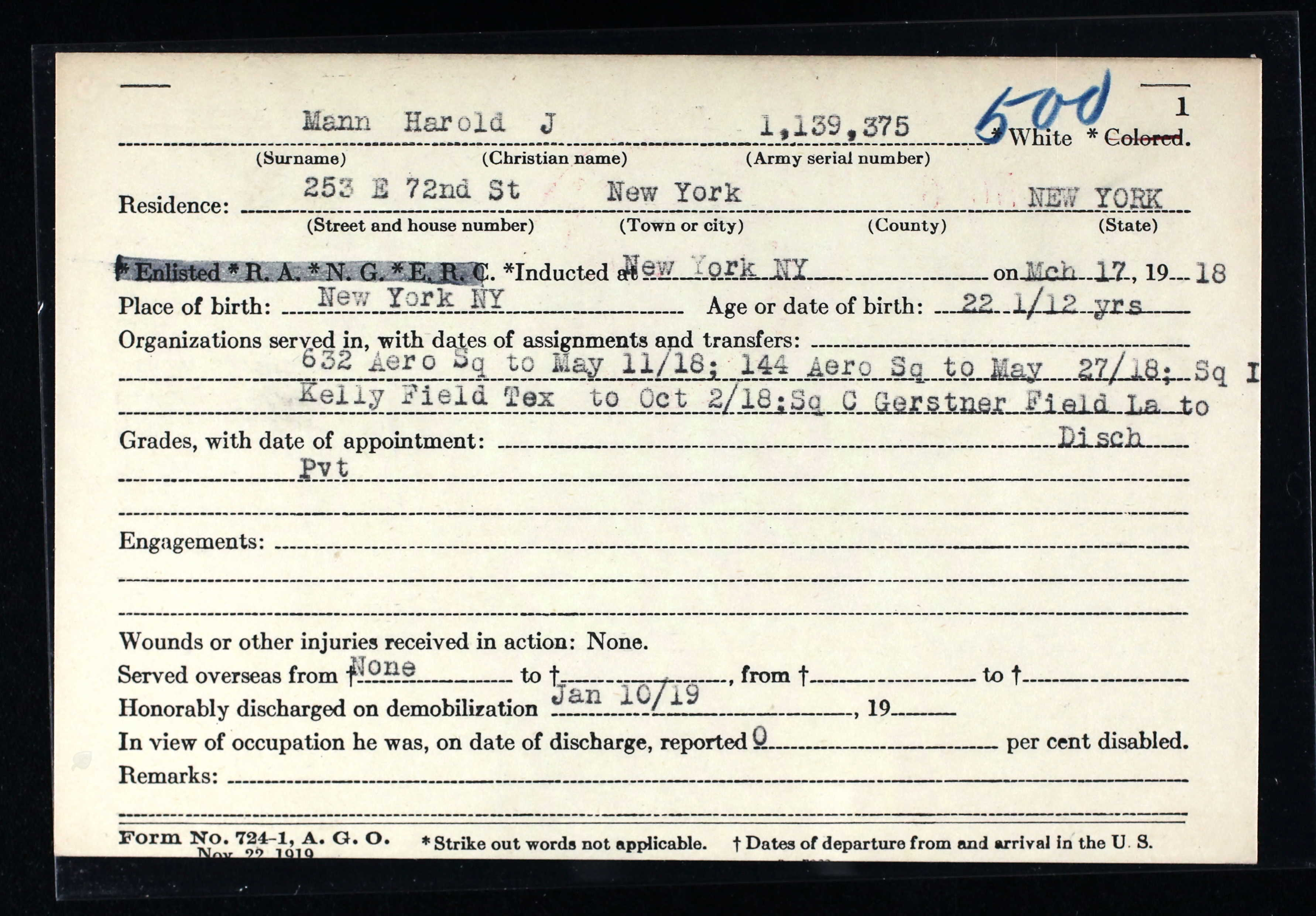
Harold J. Mann Army Air Service # 1,139,375

== Selected filmography ==
- Cupid's Fireman (1923) - Bill Evans
- The Only Woman (1924) - First Officer
- The Love Gamble (1925)
- His Master's Voice (1925)
- The Freshman (1925)
- Why Girls Go Back Home (1926, lost)
- Tramp, Tramp, Tramp (1926)
- College Days (1926)
- Ranson's Folly (1926)
- The Strong Man (1926) (uncredited)
- Going the Limit (1926)
- Orchids and Ermine (1927)
- The Drop Kick (1927)
- Backstage (1927)
- The Kid Sister (1927)
- Lost at the Front (1927)
- The Gorilla (1927)
- Speedy (1928)
- The Cowboy Kid (1928)
- Moran of the Marines (1928)
- Clear the Decks (1929)
- The Sophomore (1929)
- Street of Chance (1930)
- Recaptured Love (1930)
- The Office Wife (1930)
- Derelict (1930)
- The Widow from Chicago (1930)
- Gun Smoke (1931)
- Reckless Living (1931)
- Girl Crazy (1932)
- What Price Hollywood? (1932)
- Cheating Blondes (1933)
- No Other Woman (1933)
- Picture Brides (1934)
- Buried Loot (1935)
- Murder on a Honeymoon (1935)
- Follow the Fleet (1936)
- The Affairs of Annabel (1938)
- Rose of Washington Square (1939)
- Laugh It Off (1939)
- I Take This Oath / Police Rookie (1940)
- Enemy Agent (1940)
- The Dancing Masters (1943)
- The Gang's All Here (1943)
- The Dolly Sisters (1945)
- Three on a Ticket (1947)
- Strangers on a Train (1951) - tennis umpire (uncredited)
