= William S. Gray (film editor) =

American film editor (1896–1946)

- Born: William Sylvester Gray; August 26, 1896; Manhattan, New York, U.S.
- Died: December 16, 1946 (aged 50); Los Angeles, California, U.S.
- Occupation: Film editor
- Years active: 1929–1938

William S. Gray (August 26, 1896 – December 16, 1946) was an American film editor who was nominated for Best film editing at the 1936 Academy Awards for the film The Great Ziegfeld. He edited 35 films from 1929 to 1938, including four Three Stooges features.

== Filmography ==
- Everybody Sing (1938)
- Married Before Breakfast (1937)
- My Dear Miss Aldrich (1937)
- The Great Ziegfeld (1936)
- Piccadilly Jim (1936)
- Sinner Take All (1936)
- Baby Face Harrington (1935)
- Biography of a Bachelor Girl (1935)
- It's in the Air (1935)
- Fugitive Lovers (1934)
- Murder in the Private Car (1934)
- The Show-Off (1934)
- Straight Is the Way (1934)
- Broadway to Hollywood (1933)
- The Chief (1933)
- Made on Broadway (1933)
- Men Must Fight (1933)
- Midnight Mary (1933)
- Divorce in the Family (1932)
- Flesh (1932)
- New Morals for Old (1932)
- The Passionate Plumber (1932)
- Flying High (1931)
- Gentleman's Fate (1931)
- Politics (1931)
- Sporting Blood (1931)
- Stepping Out (1931)
- In Gay Madrid (1930)
- Way Out West (1930)
- The Hollywood Revue of 1929 (1929)
- Madame X (1929)
- Untamed (1929)
- The Voice of the City (1929)
