= Fugitive Lovers =

1934 film by Richard Boleslawski

- Directed by: Richard Boleslavsky
- Written by: Ferdinand Reyher; Frank Wead
- Produced by: Lucien Hubbard
- Starring: Madge Evans; Robert Montgomery; Nat Pendleton; Ted Healy
- Cinematography: Ted Tetzlaff
- Edited by: William S. Gray
- Production company: Metro-Goldwyn-Mayer
- Distributed by: Loew's, Inc.
- Release date: January 5, 1934
- Running time: 84 minutes
- Country: United States
- Language: English

Fugitive Lovers is a 1934 American pre-Code comedy drama film directed by Richard Boleslavsky. Released by Metro-Goldwyn-Mayer, it stars Madge Evans and Robert Montgomery with a supporting cast of Nat Pendleton, C. Henry Gordon, Ruth Selwyn, and Ted Healy and his Stooges, who are credited as "The Three Julians" in this production.

== Plot ==
Letty Morris is a New York dancer who is shunning the advances of smalltime gangster "Legs" Caffey. When he insists on taking her to Atlantic City despite her repeated rejection, she decides to sneak off on a bus to Hollywood; Legs intercepts her and boards the bus, as well, determined to win her over. The bus is filled with colorful characters, including a singing trio the Three Julians and exuberant tippler Hector Withington, Jr. As the bus passes through Eton, Pennsylvania, in the middle of the night, convict Paul Porter makes his escape from the local penitentiary and hides among the luggage, swapping his prison clothes for one of Withington's suits.

During a stopover in Harrisburg, Porter buys a seat on the bus, whereon Letty sits next to him to avoid Legs, who quickly deduces that the new passenger is Porter and threatens to turn him in. Withington gets off the bus and discovers Porter's outfit in his luggage, and informs the police; when Legs tells Porter, he quickly gets off the bus.

Porter reunites with Letty in St. Louis; they check into a hotel in separate rooms, waiting for the heat to die down to escape together, but Legs tracks Letty down. As they are about to leave, the police arrive and mistake Legs for Porter; he is about to correct them and lead them to Porter, but seeing Letty tear up, Legs realizes she is in love with Porter and allows the police to take him away.

Letty continues on the bus alone, along with Detective Daly, who pressures her for information on Porter and waits for him to rejoin her. A blizzard forces the bus to stop and the passengers are put up in bungalows; as the police close in, Porter steals the bus, and Letty joins him. As they escape, they happen on a crashed school bus filled with freezing children, and stop to help, but are then snowed in. The next day, the police arrive and rescue the children, and arrest Porter and Letty. Due to Porter's bravery, though, he is given a pardon.

== Cast ==
- Robert Montgomery as Paul Porter, aka Stephen Blaine
- Madge Evans as Letty Morris
- Ted Healy as Hector Withington, Jr.
- Nat Pendleton as Legs Caffey
- C. Henry Gordon as Detective Daly
- Ruth Selwyn as Babe Callahan
- Moe Howard as one of the Julians
- Larry Fine as one of the Julians
- Jerry Howard as one of the Julians
