= Speak Easily =

1932 film directed by Edward Sedgwick

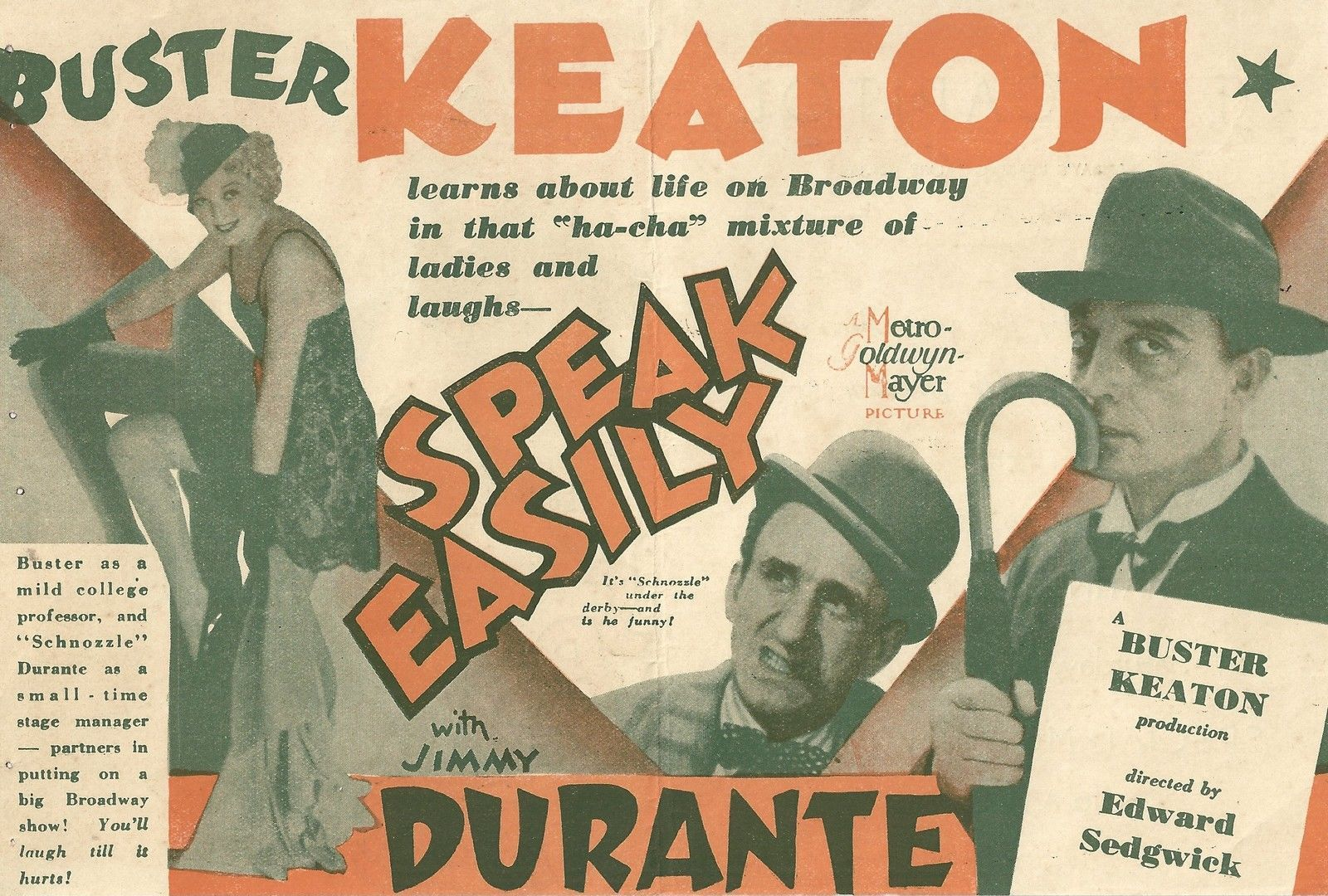
- Film pressbook for screenings in Capitol Cinema (Mumbai)
- Directed by: Edward Sedgwick
- Based on: Speak Easily; 1932 novel by Clarence Budington Kelland
- Produced by: Buster Keaton
- Starring: Buster Keaton; Jimmy Durante; Thelma Todd
- Cinematography: Harold Wenstrom
- Edited by: William LeVanway
- Distributed by: Metro-Goldwyn-Mayer
- Release date: August 13, 1932
- Running time: 80 minutes
- Country: United States
- Language: English

Speak Easily is a 1932 American pre-Code comedy film starring Buster Keaton, Jimmy Durante, and Thelma Todd, and directed by Edward Sedgwick. Keaton and Durante were again paired in The Passionate Plumber and What! No Beer?. Keaton later used many of the physical gags he created for this film when he wrote (uncredited) gags for the Marx Brothers A Night At The Opera.

== Plot ==
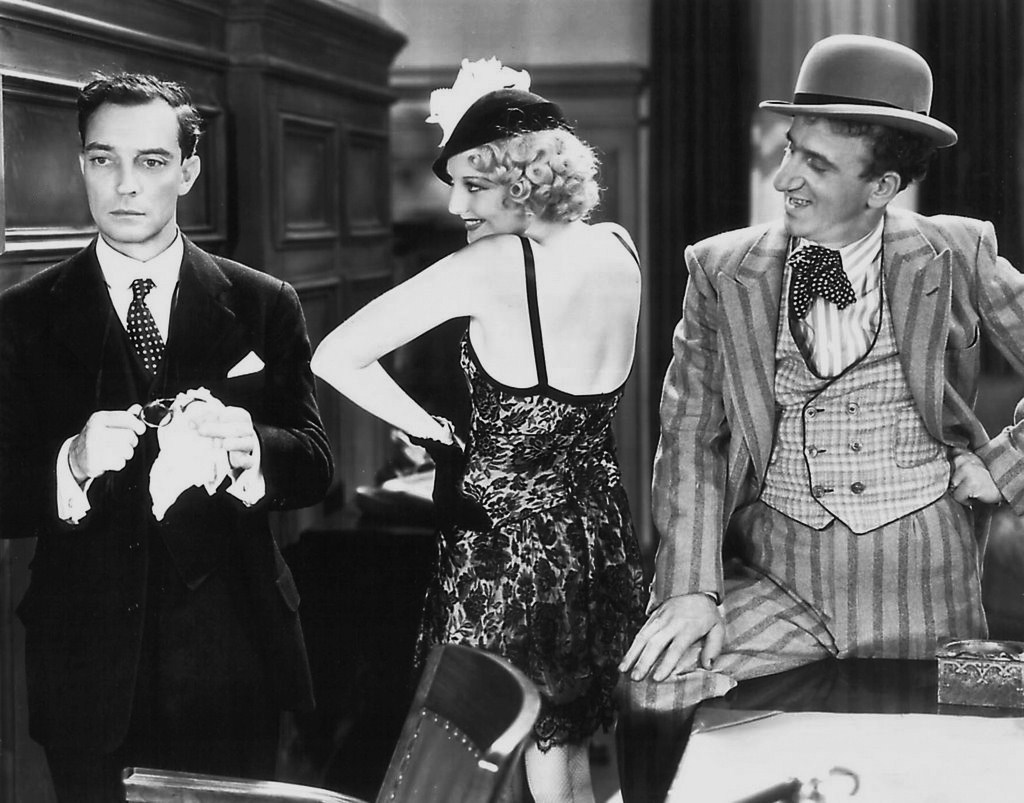
Buster Keaton, Thelma Todd, and Jimmy Durante in Speak Easily (1932)

Professor Timoleon Zanders Post is a shy Classics professor at Potts College, who has lived a sheltered life and has little experience of life outside of academia. Feeling that the professor should see more of the real world, his assistant Jenkins tricks the professor into thinking that he has inherited $750,000, allowing the professor to leave academia at last.

Boarding a train bound for New York City, Prof. Post encounters James, the manager of a dancing troupe that has an engagement in the backwater town of Fish's Switch. The professor becomes infatuated with one of the dancers, Pansy Peets, and accidentally alights at Fish's Switch when attempting to learn her name. He attends a performance by the dancing troupe at the local theatre, and is impressed by their act.

The troupe is stranded, but the professor finances the members and takes them to perform on Broadway, but only after James insists that the act be improved to a higher standard. Post's suggestions of using inspiration from Ancient Greece are taken on board, with some minor alterations, and the show is turned into a grandiose musical revue. Although Post wishes that Pansy be the leading lady, the show is quickly turned into a star vehicle for spoiled actress Eleanor Espere, who attempts to win over the professor and take total control over both the show and the money it is expected to earn at its debut. Pansy attempts to warn the professor of Eleanor's bad influence, with mixed results.

On the night of the show's debut, James discovers that Prof. Post does not really have the $750,000 he believes to possess, and attempts to keep him away from the production so the creditors won't find him. The professor stumbles on stage and performs clumsy acrobatics at several points, amusing the audience who think it to be part of the act, and ensuring the success of the show. However, his antics cause Eleanor to throw a tantrum and make a grand exit, and Prof. Post is finally able to admit his love to Pansy.

== Cast (in credits order) ==
Speak Easily

- Buster Keaton as Professor Post
- Jimmy Durante as James
- Thelma Todd as Eleanor Espere
- Ruth Selwyn as Pansy Peets
- Hedda Hopper as Mrs. Peets
- William Pawley as Griffo
- Sidney Toler as Stage Director
- Lawrence Grant as Dr. Bolton
- Henry Armetta as Tony
- Edward Brophy as Reno
- Sidney Bracey as Jenkins
- Fred Kelsey as Process Server

== Home media ==
Speak Easily is in the public domain in the United States, as its copyright was not renewed. The film has been released on DVD in several versions: from Alpha Video in 2004, from Synergy Entertainment in 2007, from Reel Classics in 2007, from Warner Archive in 2012 (as part of a "Buster Keaton Triple Feature"), and from East West Entertainment (as part of a double bill with Steamboat Bill, Jr.). The first-ever DVD release in the UK was from Powis Square Pictures in January 2009.
