= The Sign on the Door =

1921 American silent drama film

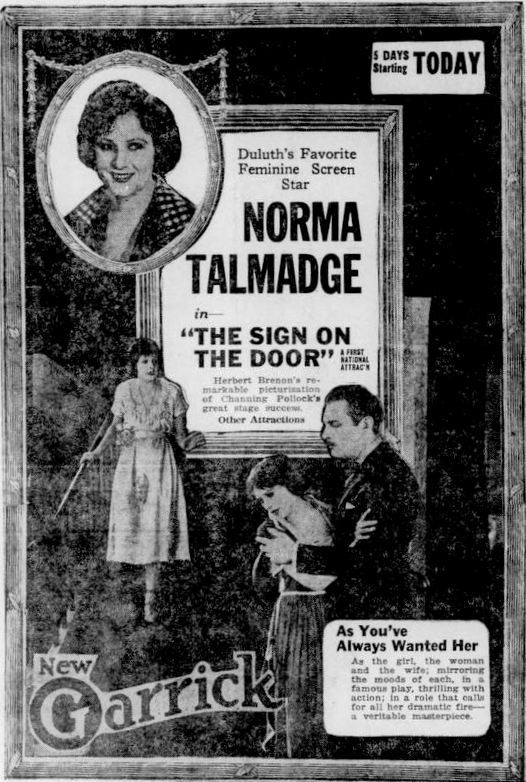
- Advertisement from The Duluth Herald7
- Directed by: Herbert Brenon
- Written by: Herbert Brenon; Mary Murillo
- Based on: The Sign on the Door by Channing Pollock
- Produced by: Norma Talmadge
- Starring: Norma Talmadge
- Cinematography: J. Roy Hunt
- Distributed by: Associated First National Pictures
- Release date: May 1921
- Running time: 84 minutes
- Country: United States
- Language: Silent (English intertitles)

The Sign on the Door is a 1921 American silent drama film starring Norma Talmadge and Lew Cody. The film was directed and written by Herbert Brenon, and based upon the 1919 play of the same name by Channing Pollock. A copy of this film is in the Library of Congress film archive.

A second adaptation of the play was filmed in 1929 as The Locked Door, starring Barbara Stanwyck.

== Cast ==
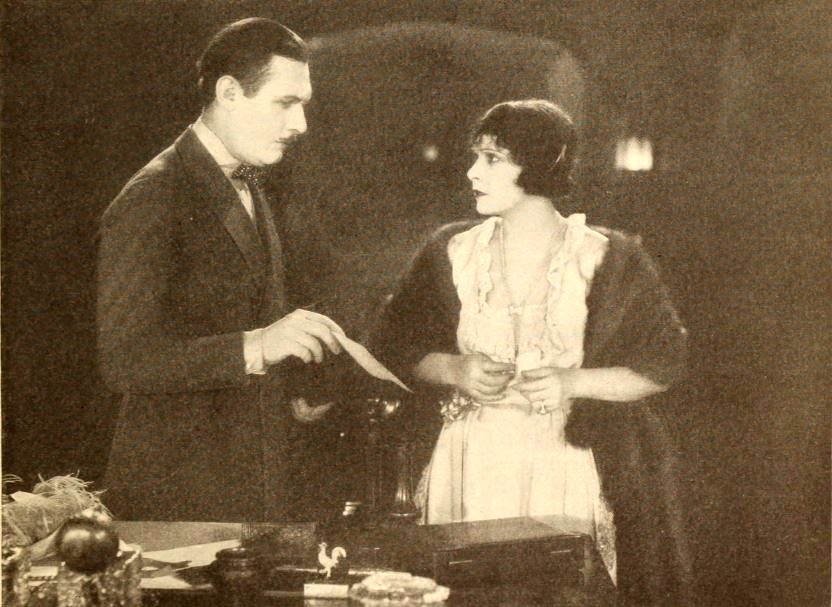
Film still with Cody and Talmadge

- Norma Talmadge as Ann Hunniwell / Mrs. 'Lafe' Regan
- Charles Richman as 'Lafe' Regan
- Lew Cody as Frank Devereaux
- David Proctor as Colonel Gaunt
- Augustus Balfour as Ferguson, Devereaux's Valet
- Mac Barnes as 'Kick' Callahan
- Helen Weir as Helen Regan
- Robert Agnew as Alan Churchill
- Norma Shearer in a bit part (uncredited)
