= The Storm (1930 film) =

1930 film by William Wyler

- Theatrical release poster
- Directed by: William Wyler
- Screenplay by: John Huston; Charles Logue; Tom Reed; Wells Root
- Based on: The Storm by Langdon McCormick
- Produced by: Carl Laemmle
- Starring: Lupe Vélez; Paul Cavanagh; William "Stage" Boyd
- Cinematography: Alvin Wyckoff
- Production company: Universal Pictures
- Distributed by: Universal Pictures
- Release date: August 22, 1930
- Running time: 80 minutes
- Country: United States
- Language: English

The Storm is a 1930 American pre-Code adventure film directed by William Wyler, written by John Huston, Charles Logue, Tom Reed and Wells Root, and starring Lupe Vélez, Paul Cavanagh, William "Stage" Boyd, Alphonse Ethier and Ernie Adams. It was released on August 22, 1930, by Universal Pictures.

== Plot ==
Burr and Dave, two close friends who have backed each other up in countless difficulties, are torn apart by the arrival of a woman, Manette, who becomes stranded with them in their cabin during a raging blizzard.

== Cast ==
- Lupe Vélez as Manette Fachard
- Paul Cavanagh as Dave Stewart
- William "Stage" Boyd as Burr Winton
- Alphonse Ethier as Jacques Fachard
- Ernie Adams as Johnny Behind the 8-Ball

== Preservation status ==
The Library of Congress has possession of a print.
