= Derelict (film) =

1930 film

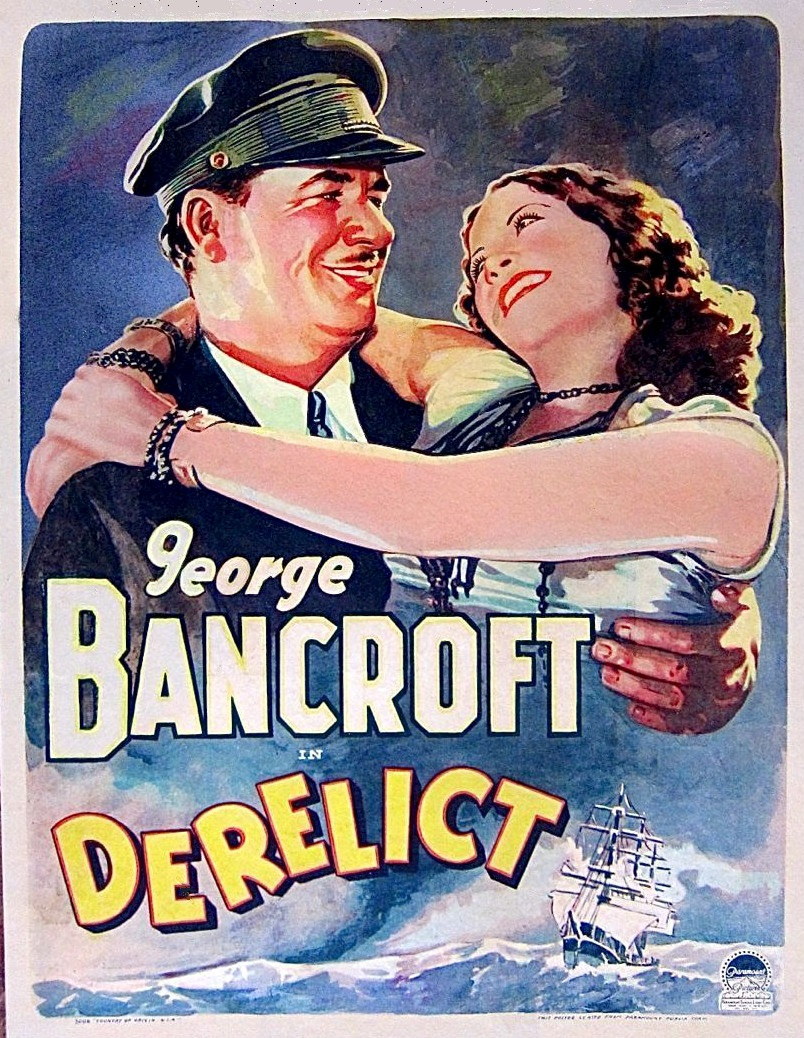
- Theatrical release poster
- Directed by: Rowland V. Lee
- Screenplay by: Grover Jones; William Slavens McNutt
- Starring: George Bancroft; Jessie Royce Landis; William "Stage" Boyd; Donald Stuart; Wade Boteler; Paul Porcasi
- Cinematography: Archie Stout
- Edited by: George Nichols Jr.
- Music by: Karl Hajos
- Production company: Paramount Pictures
- Distributed by: Paramount Pictures
- Release date: November 22, 1930
- Running time: 75 minutes
- Country: United States
- Language: English

Derelict is a 1930 American pre-Code adventure film directed by Rowland V. Lee and written by Grover Jones and William Slavens McNutt. The film stars George Bancroft, Jessie Royce Landis and William "Stage" Boyd. The film was released on November 22, 1930, by Paramount Pictures.

== Cast ==
- George Bancroft as Bill Rafferty
- Jessie Royce Landis as Helen Lorber
- William "Stage" Boyd as Jed Graves
- Donald Stuart as Fin Thomson
- Wade Boteler as Captain Gregg
- Paul Porcasi as Masoni
- Brooks Benedict as McFall
