= C. Henry Gordon =

American actor

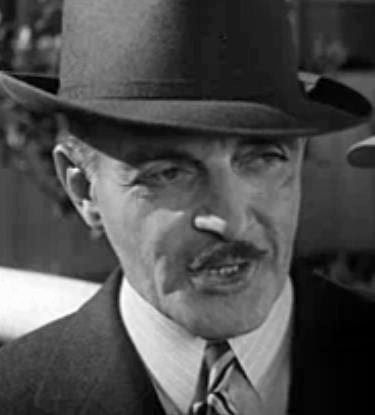
- Gordon in Long Shot (1939)
- Born: Henry Racke; June 17, 1883; New York City, New York
- Died: December 3, 1940 (aged 57); Los Angeles, California
- Occupation: Actor
- Years active: 1922 (Note: His first Broadway role was in 1922; however, it is likely he had numerous earlier off Broadway, stock, and touring roles.)–1940
- Spouse: Mrs. Gordon (?-1940) (his death)

C. Henry Gordon (born Henry Racke; June 17, 1883 – December 3, 1940) was an American stage and film actor.

Gordon was born in New York City, New York. He was educated both in New York and abroad in Switzerland and Germany. For some years he owned and ran a silver mine in New Mexico. After failing to succeed in this venture, he became an actor.

Gordon's entry into acting came accidentally when he accompanied his sister to a tryout for a play. The director had him read a part and he soon was a member of the troupe. He had a long stage career, on and off Broadway, before entering films.

For six years he appeared in the summer stock cast at Elitch Theatre (1924, 1925, 1926, 1927, 1928, & 1929.)

His Broadway credits included The Shanghai Gesture (1928), Mismates (1925), Puppets (1925), The Saint (1924), Mr. Pitt (1924), The Crooked Square (1923), Thin Ice (1922), Lights Out (1922), and The Drums of Jeopardy (1922).

He first worked in films in 1911 with George Beban in New York. He appeared in more than 70 films between 1930 and 1940, frequently as a villain. He often portrayed people of color, such as Surat Khan in The Charge of the Light Brigade (1936, opposite Errol Flynn), the Chinese smuggler Sam Kee in Lazy River (1934), and the Sultan of Padaya in Sophie Lang Goes West (1937).

On December 3, 1940, Gordon died at Hollywood Hospital in Los Angeles, California, after having his leg amputated the previous day because of a blood clot.

== Filmography ==
- A Devil with Women (1930) as Minor Role (uncredited)
- Renegades (1930) as Captain Mordiconi
- Once a Sinner (1931) as Serge Ratoff
- Charlie Chan Carries On (1931) as John Ross
- The Black Camel (1931) as Huntley Van Horn (uncredited)
- Hush Money (1931) as Jack Curtis
- A Woman of Experience (1931) as Captain Muller
- Young as You Feel (1931) as Harry Lamson
- Honor of the Family (1931) as Renard
- Mata Hari (1932) as Dubois
- The Gay Caballero (1932) as Don Paco Morales
- Scarface (1932) as Police Inspector Ben Guarino
- Doomed Battalion (1932) as Italian General
- State's Attorney (1932) as Attorney Grey
- The Strange Love of Molly Louvain (1932) as Detective Martin
- Roar of the Dragon (1932) as Voronsky
- The Washington Masquerade (1932) as Hinsdale
- Miss Pinkerton (1932) as Dr. Stuart
- Thirteen Women (1932) as Swami Yogadachi
- Hell's Highway (1932) as "Blacksnake" Skinner
- The Crooked Circle (1932) as Yoganda
- Kongo (1932) as Gregg Whitehall
- Rasputin and the Empress (1932) as Grand Duke Igor
- Whistling in the Dark (1933) as Lombardo
- The Secret of Madame Blanche (1933) as State's Attorney
- Clear All Wires! (1933) as Commissar
- Gabriel Over the White House (1933) as Nick Diamond
- Made on Broadway (1933) as Mayor Tom Starling
- Storm at Daybreak (1933) as Panto Nikitch
- The Devil's in Love (1933) as Capt. Radak, Chief of Police
- Turn Back the Clock (1933) as Dave Holmes
- Penthouse (1933) as Jim Crelliman
- Stage Mother (1933) as Ricco
- Night Flight (1933) as Daudet
- Broadway Thru a Keyhole (1933) as Tim Crowley
- The Chief (1933) as Paul Clayton
- Advice to the Forlorn (1933) as Kane
- The Women in His Life (1934) as Tony Perez
- Fugitive Lovers (1934) as Detective Daly
- This Side of Heaven (1934) as William Barnes
- Lazy River (1934) as Sam Kee
- Men in White (1934) as Dr. Cunningham
- Stamboul Quest (1934) as Ali Bey
- Straight Is the Way (1934) as Sullivan
- Hide-Out (1934) as Tony Berrelli aka The Boss
- Death on the Diamond (1934) as Joe Karnes
- The Great Hotel Murder (1935) as Dr. John M. Temple
- Pursuit (1935) as Nick Shawn
- The Crusades (1935) as Philip the Second - King of France
- Hollywood Extra Girl (1935, Short, Documentary) as Crusades Actor (uncredited)
- The Big Broadcast of 1936 (1935) as Gordoni
- Professional Soldier (1935) as Gino
- Under Two Flags (1936) as Lt. Petaine
- Hollywood Boulevard (1936) as Jordan Winslow
- The Big Game (1936) as Brad Anthony
- The Charge of the Light Brigade (1936) as Surat Khan
- Love Letters of a Star (1936) as Lt. Valcour
- Trouble in Morocco (1937) as Captain Nardant
- Charlie Chan at the Olympics (1937) as Arthur Hughes
- Trapped by G-Men (1937) as Kilgour
- Sophie Lang Goes West (1937) as Sultan of Padaya
- Conquest (1937) as Prince Poniatowski
- Stand-In (1937) as Nassau
- Tarzan's Revenge (1938) as Ben Alleu Bey
- The Black Doll (1938) as Nelson Rood
- Invisible Enemy (1938) as Nikolai Kamarov
- Yellow Jack (1938) as Col. Wiggins, Medical Corp (uncredited)
- Adventure in Sahara (1938) as Capt. Savatt
- Sharpshooters (1938) as Kolter
- Long Shot (1939) as Lew Ralston
- The Return of the Cisco Kid (1939) as Mexican Captain
- Man of Conquest (1939) as Santa Ana
- Trapped in the Sky (1939) as Fornay
- Heritage of the Desert (1939) as Henry Holderness
- Charlie Chan in City in Darkness (1939) as Prefect of Police J. Romaine
- Passport to Alcatraz (1940) as Leon Fenten
- Women in Hiding (1940, Short) as Dr. Mansby, Clinic Administrator
- Kit Carson (1940) as General Castro
- Charlie Chan at the Wax Museum (1940) as Dr. Cream
- You, the People (1940, Short) as Boss Bailey
