= The Sin of Madelon Claudet =

1931 film

- Videotape cover
- Directed by: Edgar Selwyn
- Written by: Charles MacArthur; Ben Hecht (uncredited)
- Based on: Lullaby; 1923 play by Edward Knoblock
- Produced by: Irving Thalberg
- Starring: Helen Hayes; Lewis Stone; Jean Hersholt; Robert Young
- Cinematography: Oliver T. Marsh
- Edited by: Tom Held
- Distributed by: Metro-Goldwyn-Mayer
- Release date: October 24, 1931
- Running time: 75 minutes
- Country: United States
- Language: English

The Sin of Madelon Claudet is a 1931 American pre-Code drama film directed by Edgar Selwyn and starring Helen Hayes. The screenplay by Charles MacArthur and Ben Hecht was adapted from the play The Lullaby by Edward Knoblock. It tells the story of a wrongly imprisoned woman who turns to theft and prostitution in order to support her son.

== Plot ==
When neglected wife Alice decides to leave her doctor husband Lawrence, his friend Dr. Dulac stops her and tells her the life story of another woman, the French Madelon Claudet (born May 7, 1878), who was persuaded by her American boyfriend, artist Larry Maynard, to run away with him. Eventually, he has to return to the U.S. because his father is sick. Once there however, he betrays her and marries a woman of his parents liking. Unbeknownst to Maynard, Madelon gives birth to a son. When her lover does not come back, her father persuades her to agree to marry Hubert, a farmer. However, when she refuses to give up her illegitimate son, Hubert and her father abandon her. She becomes the mistress of an older acquaintance, Count Carlo Boretti, while her friends Rosalie and Victor Lebeau care for the boy. After a while, Carlo proposes marriage and Madelon accepts. However, when they go out to celebrate, he is arrested as a jewel thief. He manages to commit suicide, but Madelon is sentenced to ten years in prison as his accomplice, even though she is innocent.

When she finally is released in 1919, she goes to see her teenage son Lawrence, now living at a state boarding school. A conversation with the school's doctor proves crucial. Dr. Dulac reveals that because his father was a criminal, he cannot get better work elsewhere. Determined not to become a similar burden to her own child, she tells her son that she is an old friend of his mother, and that his mother is dead. Madelon is determined to finance Lawrence's medical education, but with the end of World War I, millions of Frenchmen are released from the army and jobs are scarce. When a man mistakes her for a prostitute, she takes up the profession. As she ages and loses her looks, she is forced to steal as well, but finally, her goal is realized, and Lawrence receives his degree.

Aged and destitute, she decides to give up her freedom and commit herself to state charity, but visits her son one last time, pretending to be a patient. When she leaves, she encounters Dr. Dulac, who recognizes her and persuades his friend Dr. Claudet, still unaware of her true identity, to provide for her. After hearing of the woman's self-sacrifice, Alice Claudet suggests to Lawrence he invite Madelon to live with them.

== Cast ==
- Helen Hayes as Madelon Claudet
- Lewis Stone as Carlo Boretti
- Neil Hamilton as Larry Maynard
- Cliff Edwards as Victor Lebeau
- Jean Hersholt as Dr. Dulac
- Marie Prevost as Rosalie Lebeau
- Robert Young as Dr. Lawrence Claudet
- Karen Morley as Alice Claudet
- Charles Winninger as M. Novella, Photographer
- Alan Hale as Hubert
- Halliwell Hobbes as Roget, Boretti's Butler
- Lennox Pawle as Felix St. Jacques
- Russ Powell as Monsieur Claudet
- Frankie Darro as young Lawrence Claudet as a boy (uncredited)

== Production ==
The film originally was titled The Lullaby. Following its first preview, it was panned by critics, who were impressed by Hayes in her sound film debut after a couple of silent films, but thought the plot was conventional and sappy. Producer Irving Thalberg called in playwright Charles MacArthur, who was Hayes' husband, to doctor the script. He thoroughly revised it, omitting inconsequential characters and framing the story as a flashback.

Hayes had begun filming Arrowsmith for Samuel Goldwyn and had to complete that project before shooting her new scenes for the Thalberg film. It was retitled The Sin of Madelon Claudet and opened to widespread acclaim for both Hayes and the film itself. The score included the song "Adios amor" by Alfredo Antonini.

The film was voted one of the ten best pictures of the year by a Film Daily nationwide poll.

== Reception ==
In his review in The New York Times, Mordaunt Hall wrote "[Helen Hayes'] superb portrayal in a difficult role leaves only the regret that the powers that be did not see fit to have her make her screen début in a more cheerful study...The Sin of Madelon Claudet is a sorrowful chronicle which will undoubtedly have a strong popular appeal. It is endowed with other commendable impersonations...[and] also has the benefit of Edgar Selwyn's expert direction."

Time wrote that the film was "remarkable because in it Helen Hayes appears in cinema for the first time and because it succeeds in its intention — to make audiences weep...By ceasing entirely to be Helen Hayes and becoming instead the woman whose life story she portrays, Cinemactress Hayes makes the familiarity of the story double its sadness...The picture is well directed by Edgar Selwyn [and] splendidly acted by the rest of the cast."

TV Guide rates the film four stars and calls it a "well-acted soaper".

== Awards ==
- Academy Award for Best Actress - Helen Hayes
- Venice Film Festival Audience Referendum for Favorite Actress - Helen Hayes
- Venice Film Festival Audience Referendum for Most Touching Film - Edgar Selwyn
