= Ruth Selwyn =

American producer (1905–1954)

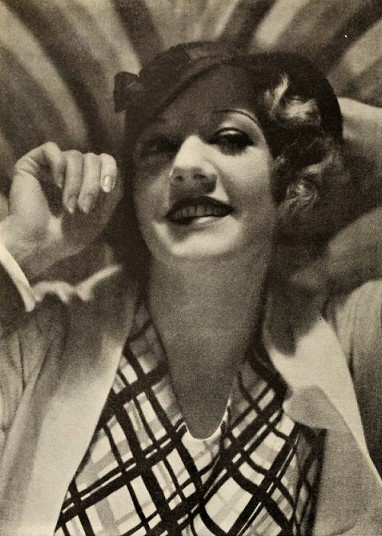
- Selwyn in 1932
- Born: Ruth Virginia Wilcox; November 6, 1905; Tazewell, Virginia, U.S.
- Died: December 13, 1954 (aged 49); Hollywood, California, U.S.
- Resting place: Forest Lawn Memorial Park
- Other names: Ruth Snyder, Ruth Warburton, Ruth Barrow
- Occupations: Actress, theatrical producer
- Spouse: Edgar Selwyn
- Relatives: Fred M. Wilcox (brother); Nicholas Schenck (brother-in-law)

Ruth Selwyn (born Ruth Virginia Wilcox; November 6, 1905 – December 13, 1954) was an American theater producer and actress.

== Early life and education ==
Ruth Wilcox was born in Tazewell, Virginia and raised in Morgantown, West Virginia, the daughter of James Columbus Wilcox and Martha McLeod WIlcox. Her father was an optometrist and jeweler. Her brother was film and television director Fred M. Wilcox. Her sister Pansy Wilcox married film studio executive Nicholas Schenck.

== Career ==
Selwyn worked as an actress and theater producer. She produced several productions of Broadway comedies and musicals. In 1930, she produced The 9:15 Revue, with formidable writing and performing rosters including Anita Loos, Ring Lardner, Ira Gershwin, George Gershwin, Harold Arlen, Eddie Cantor, Ruth Etting, and Leslie Howard. Despite this star power, the show closed after five performances. Bachelor Born, which she produced in 1938 with Milton Shubert, ran for over a year with 400 performances, and toured nationally. Her last Broadway production was Walk With Music (1940), with music by Hoagy Carmichael and lyrics by Johnny Mercer.

Selwyn was also active in developing Palm Springs, where she owned the Red Roof Ranch.

== Filmography ==
- Polly of the Circus (1932)
- The Trial of Vivienne Ware (1932)
- New Morals for Old (1932)
- Speak Easily (1932)
- Men Must Fight (1933)
- Fugitive Lovers (1934)
- Baby Face Harrington (1935)

== Personal life ==
Wilcox married three times. Wilcox's first husband was Russell Martin Snyder; they married in 1922 and divorced in 1925. They had one son, Russell. Her second husband was film director Edgar Selwyn; they married in 1926, and he adopted her son. They divorced in 1938. She married Irish-born actor John Warburton in 1943. They divorced in 1948. Ruth Selwyn died in Hollywood on December 13, 1954, and was interred at Forest Lawn Memorial Park, Glendale, California; she was 49 years old.
