= Just like Heaven (1930 film) =

1930 film

- Directed by: Roy William Neill
- Written by: Adele Buffington
- Starring: Anita Louise; David Newell; Yola d'Avril
- Cinematography: Max Dupont
- Edited by: Charles J. Hunt
- Production company: Tiffany Pictures
- Distributed by: Tiffany Pictures; Gaumont British Distributors (UK)
- Release date: October 22, 1930
- Running time: 70 minutes
- Country: United States
- Language: English

Just like Heaven is a 1930 American pre-Code romantic drama film directed by Roy William Neill and starring Anita Louise, David Newell, and Yola d'Avril. It was produced and distributed by Tiffany Pictures. It was released the following year in Britain by Gaumont British.

== Plot ==
In Paris, Tobey, a young balloon seller, clashes with Mimi, the star dancer of a circus troupe, over a key spot on the city's streets. Soon he finds himself falling for her and when her grandfather is robbed by thieves involved with café entertainer Fifi, Tobey secretly pays for her dancing lessons in order for her to fulfil her ambitions.

== Cast ==
- Anita Louise as Mimi Martell
- David Newell as Tobey Mitchell
- Yola d'Avril as Fifi
- Gaston Glass as Jean
- Mathilde Comont as Madame Fogharde
- Thomas Jefferson as Michael
- Torben Meyer as Pierre
- Albert Roccardi as Monsieur Fogharde
- Emile Chautard as Jacques Dulac
- Louis Mercier as Bartender

== Bibliography ==
- Pitts, Michael R. Poverty Row Studios, 1929-1940. McFarland & Company, 1997.
