= Lady and Gent =

1932 film

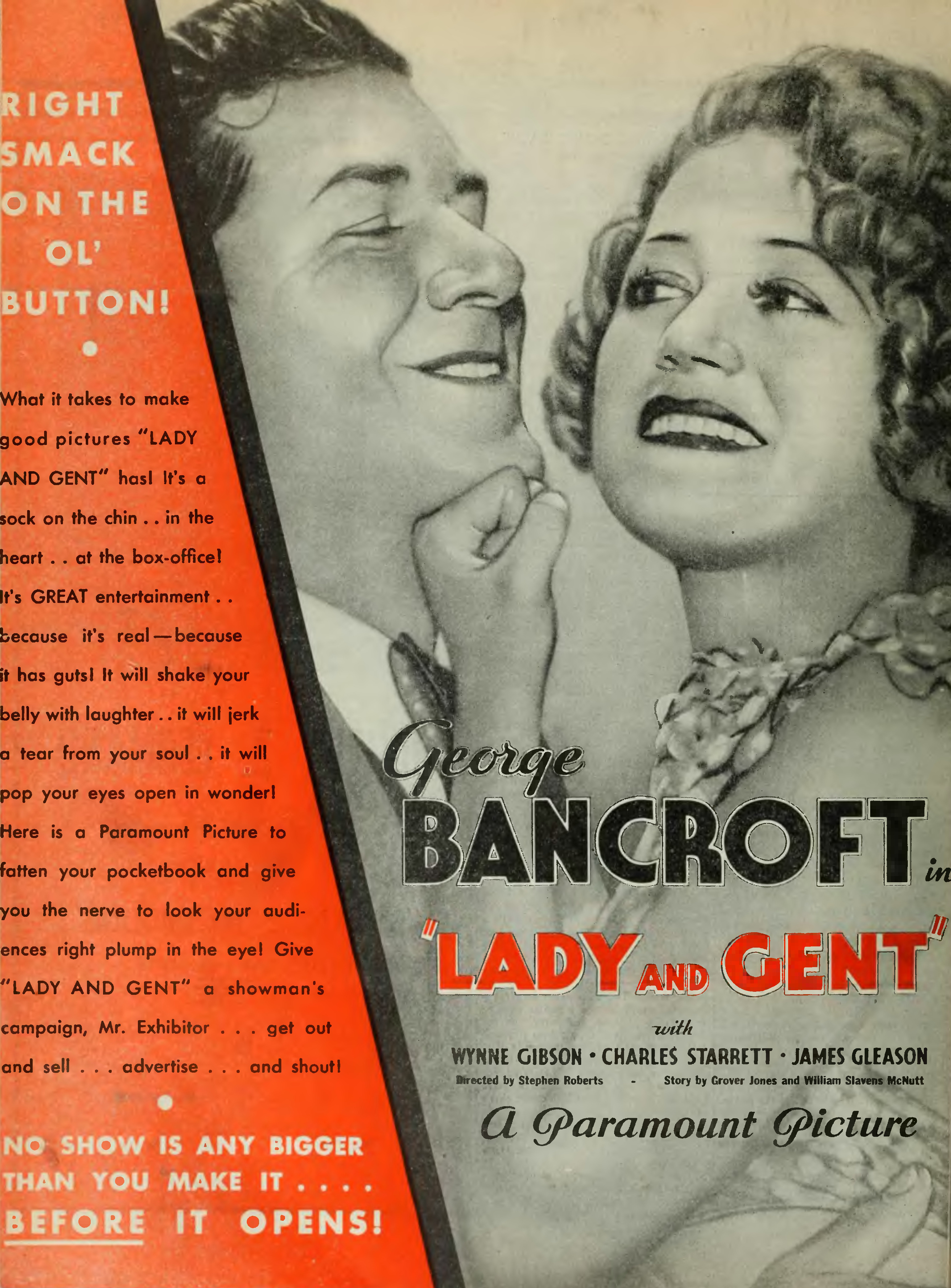
- Film poster
- Directed by: Stephen Roberts
- Written by: Grover Jones; William Slavens McNutt
- Starring: George Bancroft; Wynne Gibson; Charles Starrett; James Gleason
- Cinematography: Harry Fischbeck
- Distributed by: Paramount Pictures
- Release date: July 15, 1932
- Running time: 84 minutes
- Country: United States
- Language: English

Lady and Gent is a 1932 American pre-Code drama film directed by Stephen Roberts for Paramount, featuring a young Charles ("Durango Kid") Starrett, Syd ("Three Mesquiteers") Saylor and an early supporting role by John Wayne.

== Plot ==
A young boxer named Buzz Kinney, fresh out of college, is able to knock out Stag Bailey when the veteran fighter becomes cocky. His manager, Pin Streaver, is left despondent as he had bet a huge amount of money on Stag, including a large percentage of the prize money, and can't pay what he owes. When Stag's attempts to borrow the cash fails, Pin tries unsuccessfully to rob the boxing arena's safe and is killed by a security guard while escaping. Stag manages to bring Pin's body to another location and tells police that Pin apparently shot himself, so that Pin won't go down as a criminal.

Pin's school-aged son Ted shows up, and Stag and his girlfriend Puff help raise the boy, while trying to dissuade him from a career in boxing. Later in the film, Buzz Kinney shows up in a bar, badly beaten in a fight, with a broken nose and a cauliflower ear. He insults Puff, and Stag takes him out to the kitchen and punches him out. Stag and Puff get married so they can legally adopt Ted, and they talk the boy into going to college instead of being a prizefighter.

== Cast ==
- George Bancroft as Stag Bailey
- Wynne Gibson as Puff Rogers
- Charles Starrett as Ted Streaver
- James Gleason as Pin Streaver
- John Wayne as Buzz Kinney
- Morgan Wallace as Cash Enright
- James Crane as McSweeley
- William Halligan as Doc Hayes
- Joyce Compton as Betty
- Frank McGlynn Sr. as Principal
- Charley Grapewin as Grocer
- Lew Kelly as Coroner
- Syd Saylor as Joe

== See also ==
- John Wayne filmography
