= Penelope (1966 film) =

1966 American comedy film by Arthur Hiller

- Directed by: Arthur Hiller
- Screenplay by: George Wells
- Produced by: Arthur Loew Jr. (executive); Joe Pasternak
- Starring: Natalie Wood; Ian Bannen; Dick Shawn; Peter Falk; Lila Kedrova; Lou Jacobi; Jonathan Winters
- Cinematography: Harry Stradling
- Edited by: Rita Roland
- Music by: Johnny Williams
- Production company: Euterpe
- Distributed by: Metro-Goldwyn-Mayer
- Release date: November 10, 1966
- Running time: 98 minutes
- Country: United States
- Language: English
- Budget: $4 million
- Box office: $4,000,000 (rentals)

Penelope is a 1966 American comedy caper film directed by Arthur Hiller, and starring Natalie Wood, Ian Bannen, Peter Falk, Jonathan Winters, and Dick Shawn. George Wells' screenplay was based on the 1965 novel of the same title, written by Howard Fast under the pseudonym E.V. Cunningham.

== Plot ==
Penelope Elcott is married to wealthy banker James Elcott. Donning a white wig, prosthetic mask, and baggy clothes, she robs her husband's bank posing as an elderly woman. While the police, including Lieutenant Horatio Bixbee, rush to get to the bank, Penelope escapes in a red wig and yellow suit. She donates some of the stolen money to a Salvation Army worker and donates the suit to a second-hand thrift shop. Con artists Sabada and Ducky immediately recognize the suit as an original designer outfit from Paris and purchase it for a mere $7.

Penelope visits her psychiatrist Gregory and tells him all about her criminal activities. She says it began in college when a professor lured her into his laboratory and attempted to rape her, but she escaped, leaving her dress ripped off in the process. During the chase, she stole the watch fob of the professor. She next stole on her wedding day. When she caught her maid of honor Mildred Halliday kissing James, she swiped Mildred's earrings and necklace. Gregory suggests she is stealing to attract attention from her distant husband.

A young woman, Honeysuckle Rose, is accused of being the thief. Gregory wants to return the stolen money to the bank, but panics when he hears police cars arriving. Penelope confesses and tries to clear the innocent Honeysuckle, but Horatio the cop and husband James do not believe her. Ducky and Sabada pay a visit, trying to blackmail her, but Penelope foils their blackmail attempt.

Penelope hosts a dinner party, having stolen from all the invited guests. She tries to return the stolen items, but all claim that they never have seen them before. Penelope, confused and frightened, runs away. She again robs James' bank, but unlike the previous time, she is crying. James begs Horatio to find her. Penelope goes to Horatio with the stolen money, but the cop knows James would not press charges against his own wife.

The psychiatrist explains the dinner guests denied recognizing the stolen items because they would lose the fraudulently inflated insurance claims they collected. Gregory breaks down and begs Penelope to run away with him. She refuses, telling him she is cured. James realizes that he has neglected Penelope and starts seeing her face everywhere he turns. He goes to the psychiatrist's office, where James and Penelope happily reunite.

== Cast ==
- Natalie Wood as Penelope Elcott
- Ian Bannen as James B. Elcott
- Dick Shawn as Dr. Gregory Mannix
- Peter Falk as Lieutenant Horatio Bixbee
- Lila Kedrova as Princess Sadaba
- Lou Jacobi as Ducky
- Jonathan Winters as Professor Klobb
- Norma Crane as Mildred Halliday
- Arthur Malet as Salvation Army Major Higgins
- Jerome Cowan as bank manager
- Arlene Golonka as Honeysuckle Rose
- Amzie Strickland as Miss Serena
- Bill Gunn as Sergeant Rothschild
- Carl Ballantine as Boom Boom
- Iggie Wolfington as store owner

== Production ==
The novel was published in 1965. The Los Angeles Times called it "that rare addition to whodunnit fiction, an original and unusual plot told with wit and intelligence".

Edith Head provided Wood with a $250,000 wardrobe for the film.

Filming started in New York in May 1966.

Wood later said making the film was difficult for her. "I broke out in hives and suffered anguish that was very real pain every day we shot", she recalled. "Arthur Hiller, the director, kept saying, 'Natalie, I think you're resisting this film', while I rolled around the floor in agony."

== Reception ==
The film was a box-office disappointment. Wood did not make another movie for three years. Film critic Leonard Maltin dismissed the film as "this quite unfunny comedy", awarding it 1 1/2 of 4 stars.

== See also ==
- List of American films of 1966
