= The Chief (film) =

1933 film

- Lobby card
- Directed by: Charles Reisner
- Written by: Arthur Caesar; Robert E. Hopkins
- Produced by: Harry Rapf
- Starring: Ed Wynn; Charles "Chic" Sale; Dorothy Mackaill; William "Stage" Boyd; Effie Ellsler; C. Henry Gordon
- Cinematography: Edward Paul
- Edited by: William S. Gray
- Production company: Metro-Goldwyn-Mayer
- Distributed by: Loew's, Inc.
- Release date: November 3, 1933
- Running time: 65 minutes
- Country: United States
- Language: English

The Chief is a 1933 American pre-Code comedy film directed by Charles Reisner and written by Arthur Caesar and Robert E. Hopkins. The film stars Ed Wynn, Charles "Chic" Sale, Dorothy Mackaill, William "Stage" Boyd, Effie Ellsler and C. Henry Gordon. The film was released on November 3, 1933, by Metro-Goldwyn-Mayer.

This is based on Wynn's famous radio character, and the film ends with Wynn on his own radio show.

== Plot ==
A timid man is thrust into the spotlight when his father is honored as a hero. He blunders into a series of adventures because of a woman and becomes a hero himself. Although two political parties try to use him for their benefit, he unwittingly foils all their plans.

== Cast ==
- Ed Wynn as Henry Summers
- Charles "Chic" Sale as Uncle Joe
- Dorothy Mackaill as Dixie Dean
- William "Stage" Boyd as Dan 'Danny' O'Rourke
- Effie Ellsler as Ma Summers
- C. Henry Gordon as Paul Clayton
- Mickey Rooney as Willie
- Purnell Pratt as Al Morgan
- George Givot as Greek Clothing Merchant
- Tom Wilson as Blink
- Nat Pendleton as Big Mike

== Reception ==
The film was a box office disappointment for MGM.
