= Edgar Selwyn =

American actor and director (1875–1944)

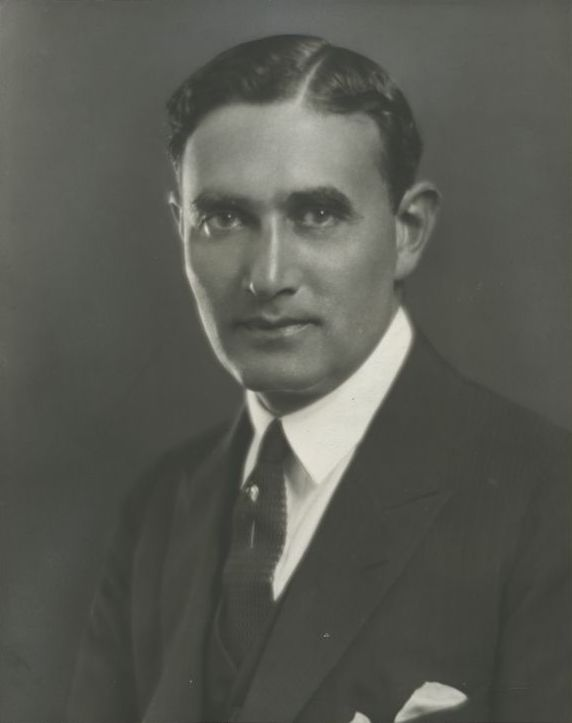
- Selwyn, c. 1920s
- Born: October 20, 1875; Cincinnati, Ohio, US
- Died: February 13, 1944 (aged 68); Los Angeles, California, US
- Occupations: Actor; playwright; theatre producer; theatre director; screenwriter; film producer; film director
- Years active: 1899–1942
- Spouse(s): Margaret Mayo (m. 1901; div. 1919) Ruth Selwyn
- Relatives: Archibald Selwyn (brother); Nicholas Schenck (co-brother-in-law); Fred M. Wilcox (brother-in-law)

Edgar Selwyn (October 20, 1875 – February 13, 1944) was an American actor, playwright, director and producer on Broadway. A prominent figure in American theatre and film in the first half of the 20th century, he founded a theatrical production company with his brother, Archibald Selwyn, and owned a number of Selwyn Theatres in the United States. He transferred his talents from the stage to motion pictures, and directed a film for which Helen Hayes received the Academy Award for Best Actress. Selwyn co-founded Goldwyn Pictures in 1916.

== Biography ==
Born in Cincinnati, Ohio, Selwyn flourished in the Broadway theater as an actor, playwright, director, and producer from 1899 to 1942. With his brother Archibald Selwyn (November 3, 1877 – June 21, 1959) he founded the theatrical production company The Selwyns which produced plays on Broadway from 1919 to 1932 (see, e.g., Wedding Bells). The Selwyns owned several theatres in the United States including the Park Square Theatre in Boston; the Hanna Theatre in Cleveland, Ohio; the Selwyn in Chicago; and the Selwyn, Apollo, and Times Square theatres in New York City.

Selwyn also worked in Hollywood, producing and directing eight films between 1929 and 1942. Among these was The Sin of Madelon Claudet (1931), which Selwyn directed for Metro-Goldwyn-Mayer. The film starred Helen Hayes, who won an Academy Award for her performance. Additionally, Selwyn wrote two screenplays and many more films were adapted from his original plays. He died in Los Angeles, California.

His second wife was actress Ruth Selwyn, a sister of director Fred M. Wilcox and sister-in-law of Nicholas Schenck.

== Partial filmography ==
- Pierre of the Plains (1914) (actor, play)
- The Arab (1915) (actor, play)
- For Better, for Worse (1919) (play)
- The Mirage (1924) (play)
- The Sin of Madelon Claudet (1931) (director)
- Skyscraper Souls (1932) (director)
- Men Must Fight (1933) (director)
- Turn Back the Clock (1933) (director and co-writer)
- The Mystery of Mr. X (1934) (director)
