= William "Stage" Boyd =

American actor (1886–1935)

- Born: William Henry Boyd; December 18, 1886; New York City, U.S.
- Died: March 20, 1935 (aged 48); Los Angeles, California, U.S.
- Occupation(s): Stage actor, film actor
- Years active: 1913–1935

William H. Boyd (December 18, 1886 in New York City, New York – March 20, 1935 in Los Angeles, California) was an American actor billed as William "Stage" Boyd or William Stage Boyd.

== Biography ==
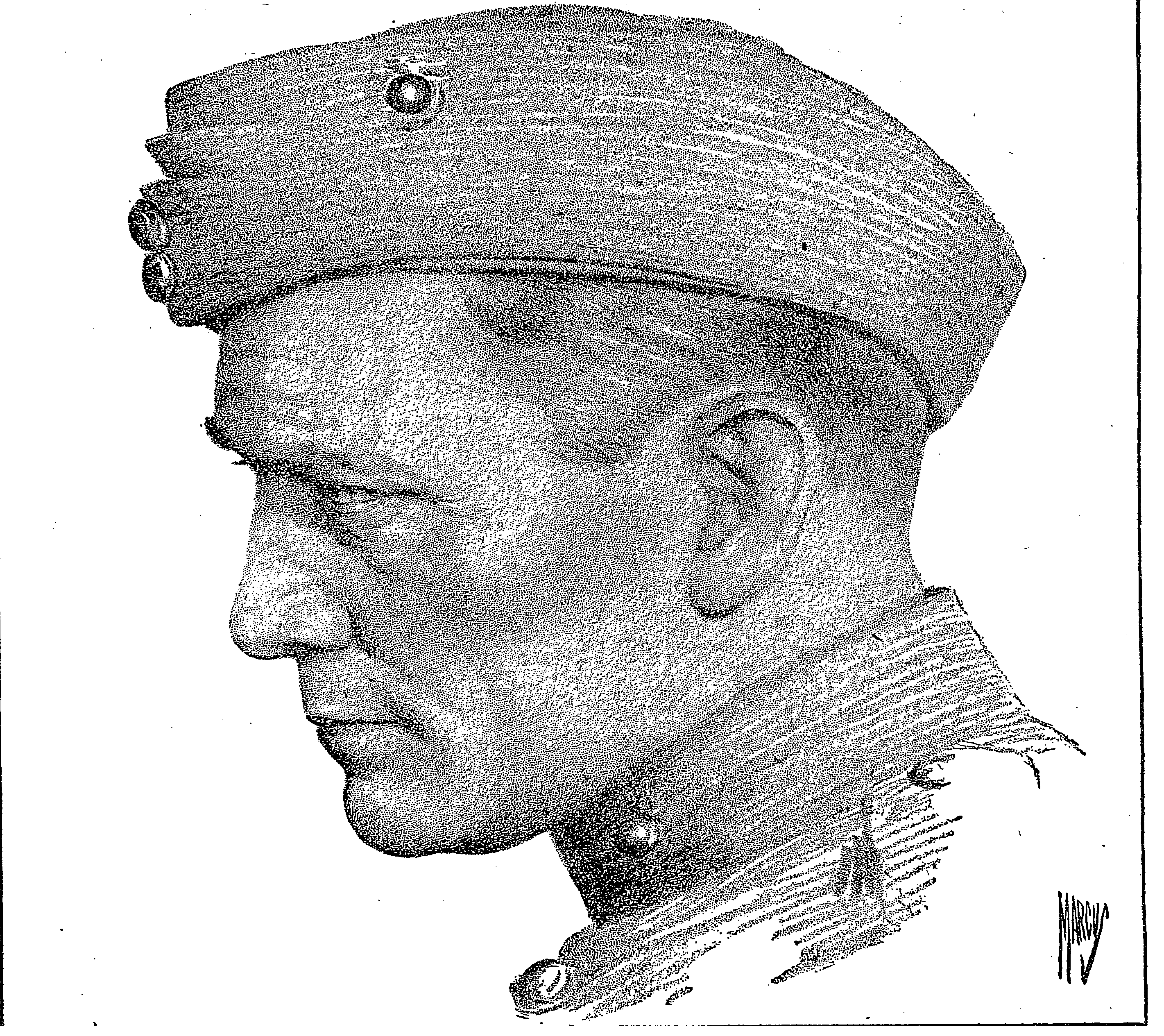
Drawing of Boyd as Sergeant Quirt in What Price Glory?.

Boyd was an early 20th century stage actor who appeared in two Broadway plays and then worked in motion pictures. To avoid confusion with the better-known performer working under the same name, William Boyd (best known for playing Hopalong Cassidy), Boyd adopted the name William "Stage" Boyd to emphasize his experience on the legitimate stage. Such experience was considered an advantage to an actor after the introduction of talking pictures.

Boyd's arrests for alcohol possession (during Prohibition) and drug possession damaged his career and that of the other William Boyd. Many newspapers reported the arrests, but published photos of the wrong William Boyd, who lost his studio contract with RKO.

Boyd's first wife, Margaret Christiansen, later married theatrical producer Harry Frazee, the one-time owner of the Boston Red Sox who is best remembered for selling Babe Ruth to the New York Yankees.

== Filmography ==
Year	Title	Role	Notes
1913	The Star of India		
1915	Stop Thief!	Dr. Willoughby	
1915	The Ringtailed Rhinoceros	Prime Minister	
1916	The Kiss of Hate	Isaac	Lost film
1918	Marriages Are Made	Max Rupholdt	
1918	Virtuous Wives	Monte Bracken	
1920	Blackbirds	Detective	Lost film
1929	The Locked Door	Lawrence Reagan	
1930	The Benson Murder Case	Harry Gray	
1930	Those Who Dance	Diamond Joe Jennings	
1930	The Storm	Burr Winton	
1930	The Spoilers	Alec McNamara	
1930	Derelict	Jed Graves	
1931	The Gang Buster	'Sudden Mike' Slade	
1931	Gun Smoke	Kedge Darvis	
1931	City Streets	McCoy	
1931	Murder by the Clock	Lt. Valcour	
1931	The Road to Reno	Jerry Kenton	
1931	The False Madonna	Dr. Ed Marcy	
1932	Sky Devils	Sgt. Hogan	
1932	The Wiser Sex	Harry Evans	
1932	State's Attorney	Valentine 'Vanny' Powers	
1932	The Painted Woman	Captain Boynton	
1932	Madison Square Garden	Sloane	
1932	Midnight Warning	Thorwaldt Cornish	
1932	Rasputin and the Empress	Comrade General	Uncredited
1933	Oliver Twist	Bill Sikes	
1933	Laughing at Life	Inspector Mason	
1933	The Chief	Dan 'Danny' O'Rourke	
1933	The House on 56th Street	Bonelli	
1934	The Girl from Missouri	George - Eadie's Stepfather	Uncredited
1934	Transatlantic Merry-Go-Round	Joe Saunders	
1935	Night Life of the Gods	Mulligan	
1935	The Lost City	Zolok	Serial. Final film role
