= After All (play) =

1929 play written by John Van Druten

- Written by: John Van Druten
- Original language: English
- Genre: Drama

Premiere
- Date premiered: 1929
- Place premiered: Apollo Theatre, London

After All is a 1929 play by the British writer John Van Druten. After a West End run at the Apollo Theatre it transferred to Broadway in 1931.

== Film adaptation ==
In 1932 it was adapted into an American film New Morals for Old by MGM starring Robert Young and Lewis Stone.

== Bibliography ==
- Goble, Alan. The Complete Index to Literary Sources in Film. Walter de Gruyter, 1999.
- Wearing, J. P. The London Stage 1920-1929: A Calendar of Productions, Performers, and Personnel. Rowman & Littlefield, 2014.
