= The Flood (1931 film) =

1931 drama film directed by James Tinling

- Directed by: James Tinling
- Story by: John Thomas Neville
- Cinematography: John Stumar
- Edited by: Gene Milford
- Production company: Columbia Pictures
- Distributed by: Columbia Pictures
- Release date: February 28, 1931 (US)
- Running time: 7 reels
- Country: United States
- Language: English

The Flood is a 1931 pre-Code American melodrama film directed by James Tinling from a story by John Thomas Neville. Sam Nelson was assistant director. Produced and distributed by Columbia Pictures, the film was released in the US on 28 February 1931.

== Cast ==
- Eleanor Boardman as Joan Marshall
- Monte Blue as David Bruce
- Frank Sheridan as David Bruce, Sr.
- David Newell as Randolph Bannister
- William V. Mong as Colonel Marshall
- Violet Barlowe as Emily
- Eddie Tamblyn as Willy
- Arthur Hoyt as Uncle George
- Ethel Wales as Aunt Constance
- Buddy Ray as Ray Jeff

== Production ==
Production for The Flood lasted from 10 December 1930 to 14 January 1931. The film's copyright was registered on 25 February 1931.
