= Cupid's Fireman =

1923 film

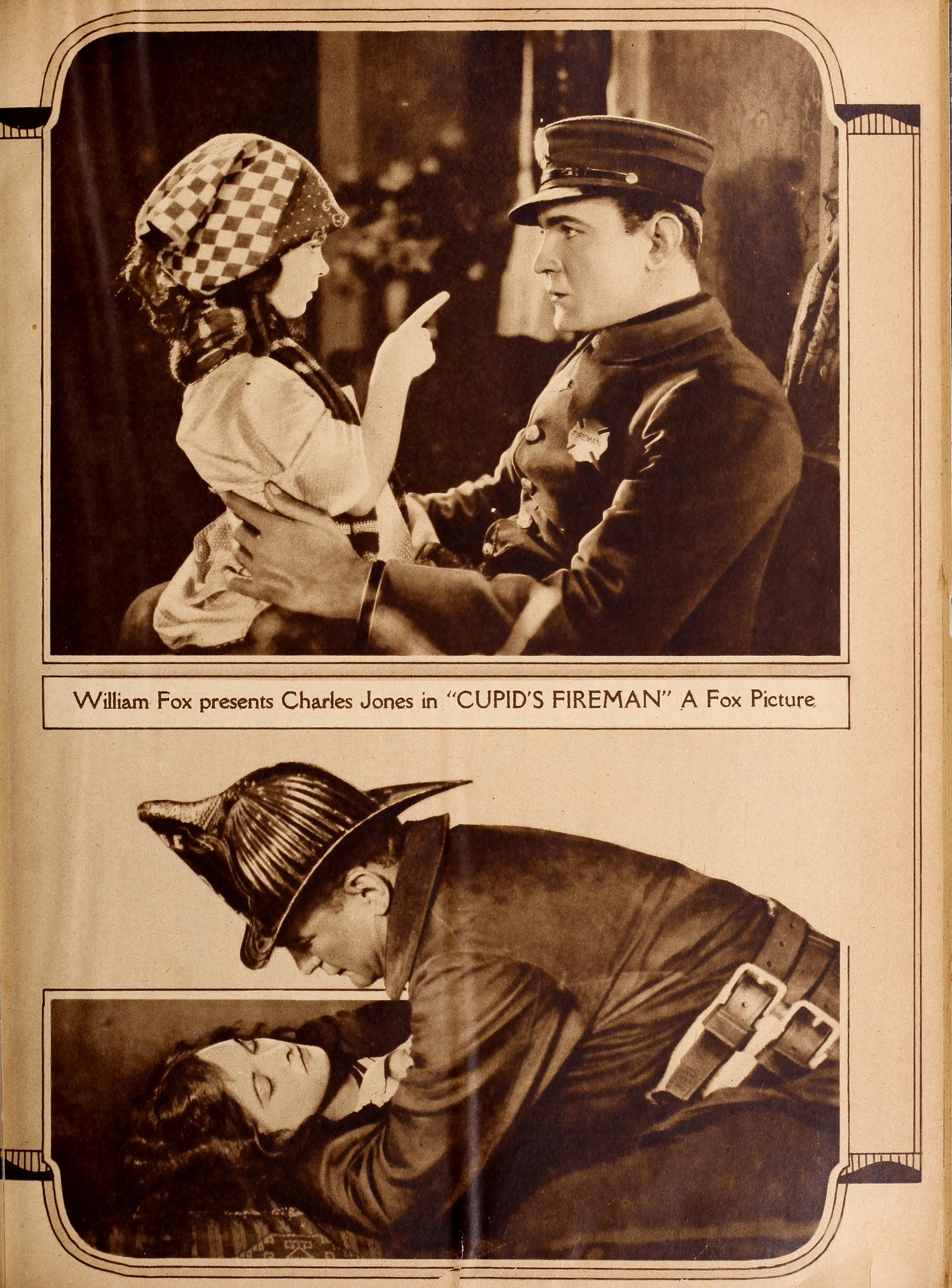
- Buck Jones, Eileen O'Malley, and Marian Nixon in publicity stills
- Directed by: William A. Wellman
- Written by: Eugene B. Lewis
- Based on: "Andy M'Gee's Chorus Girl" by Richard Harding Davis
- Produced by: William Fox
- Starring: Buck Jones
- Cinematography: Joseph H. August
- Production company: Fox Film Corporation
- Distributed by: Fox Film Corporation
- Release date: December 16, 1923
- Running time: 57 minutes
- Country: United States
- Language: Silent (English intertitles)

Cupid's Fireman is a 1923 American silent action drama film directed by William A. Wellman and produced and distributed by Fox Film Corporation.

== Plot ==
As described in a film magazine review, fireman Andy McGee adopts a little orphan girl after the death of his mother. He falls in love with chorus girl Agnes Evans who has a brutal husband. The house where Agnes lives catches fire, and the fire department responds by dispatching Andy's fire brigade. Andy saves Agnes and then attempts to save her drunken husband, but the floor collapses beneath him and he dies. Agnes and Andy are then united.

== Cast ==
- Buck Jones as Andy McGee
- Marian Nixon as Agnes Evans
- Brooks Benedict as Bill Evans
- Eileen O'Malley as Elizabeth Stevens
- Lucy Beaumont as Mother
- Al Fremont as Fire-Department Chief
- Charles McHugh as Old Man Turner
- Mary Warren as Molly Turner
- Louis King as Veteran

== Preservation ==
The film is now lost.
