= The Hole in the Wall (1929 film) =

1929 film

- Directed by: Robert Florey
- Written by: Pierre Collings
- Based on: The Hole in the Wall by Frederick J. Jackson
- Starring: Claudette Colbert; Edward G. Robinson; David Newell
- Cinematography: George J. Folsey
- Edited by: Mort Blumenstock
- Music by: Gerard Carbonara; W. Franke Harling
- Distributed by: Paramount Pictures
- Release date: April 27, 1929
- Running time: 63 minutes
- Country: United States
- Language: English

The Hole in the Wall is a 1929 pre-Code mystery drama film directed by Robert Florey, and starring Claudette Colbert and Edward G. Robinson. This early talking picture was the first appearance of Robinson in the role of a gangster, and "can be viewed as a dry run for his eventual success (in 1931 in Little Caesar)". It was also one of Colbert's first film appearances.

The film was shot at Paramount's Astoria Studios in New York. The film is a remake of an earlier 1921 silent The Hole in the Wall.

== Plot ==
The film

The Fox, a con man, teams up with Madame Mystera, a fake fortune teller, to bilk naive people of their money. When Madame Mystera dies in an elevated train derailment, the Fox hires Jean Oliver to replace her. However, over time, he comes to believe that Jean actually does have supernatural powers.

== Cast ==
- Claudette Colbert as Jean Oliver
- Edward G. Robinson as The Fox
- David Newell as Gordon Grant
- Nellie Savage as Madame Mystera
- Donald Meek as Goofy
- Alan Brooks as Jim
- Louise Closser Hale as Mrs. Ramsay
- Katherine Emmet as Mrs. Carlake
- Marcia Kagno as Marcia
- Barry Macollum as Dogface
- George MacQuarrie as Inspector
- Helen Crane as Mrs. Lyons

== Criticism ==
According to critic Troy Howarth, the film "is an interesting amalgam of gangster melodrama and horror, one in which Edward G. Robinson steals the show." Colbert's "character becomes more complex as the picture unfolds, and the actress keeps up just fine." He commented that Florey's bizarre set designs for the medium's den looked as if they were inspired by the German film The Cabinet of Dr. Caligari.
