= Arthur M. Loew =

Film and theater executive (1897–1977)

Arthur Marcus Loew (October 5, 1897 - September 6, 1977) was an American motion picture and theater executive, son of Marcus Loew and father of producer Arthur Loew Jr. by his first wife Mildred (daughter of Adolph Zukor).

== Biography ==
After serving as a chief machinist's mate in the United States Navy during World War I he became first vice president of Loew's, Inc. in 1927 (the year Marcus Loew died and Nicholas Schenck became Loew's president) and president of Loew's International Corp. in 1945.

In 1955 he succeeded chairman Schenck as president of Loew's (then under court order to separate its theaters from its production subsidiary Metro-Goldwyn-Mayer following the United States v. Paramount Pictures, Inc. decision) but resigned the next year for health reasons before the company was separated into Metro-Goldwyn Mayer Inc. (production) and the theater chain acquired by Laurence and Robert Tisch's hotel company, which became Loews Corporation and later spun off the theaters as what became Loews Cineplex Entertainment.

Married four times, Loew died at his Glen Cove, New York home in September 1977.
