= Lazy River (film) =

1934 film

- Film poster
- Directed by: George B. Seitz
- Written by: Lea David Freeman; Lucien Hubbard
- Produced by: Lucien Hubbard
- Starring: Jean Parker; Robert Young
- Cinematography: Gregg Toland
- Edited by: William LeVanway
- Production company: Metro-Goldwyn-Mayer
- Distributed by: Loew's, Inc.
- Release date: March 16, 1934
- Running time: 75 minutes
- Country: United States
- Language: English

Lazy River is a 1934 American pre-Code drama film directed by George B. Seitz and starring Jean Parker and Robert Young.

== Cast ==
- Jean Parker as Sarah Lescalle
- Robert Young as William 'Bill' Drexel
- Ted Healy as William 'Gabby' Stone
- Nat Pendleton as Alfred 'Tiny' Smith
- C. Henry Gordon as Sam Kee
- Ruth Channing as Ruby Drexel
- Maude Eburne as Miss Minnie Lescalle
- Raymond Hatton as Capt. Herbert Orkney
- Irene Franklin as Suzanne
- Joseph Cawthorn as Mr. Julius Ambrose
- Erville Alderson as Sheriff
- George J. Lewis as Armand Lescalle (as George Lewis)
