= The Locked Door =

1929 film

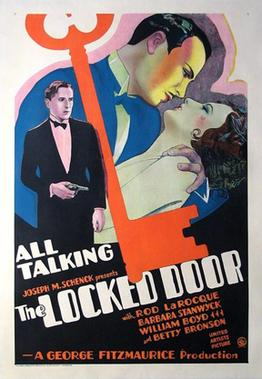
- Theatrical release poster
- Directed by: George Fitzmaurice
- Written by: George Scarborough; Earle Browne
- Screenplay by: C. Gardner Sullivan
- Based on: The Sign on the Door by Channing Pollock
- Produced by: Joseph M. Schenck; Joseph P. Kennedy
- Starring: Rod LaRocque; Barbara Stanwyck; William "Stage" Boyd; Betty Bronson
- Cinematography: Ray June
- Edited by: Hal Kern
- Production company: Feature Productions
- Distributed by: United Artists
- Release date: November 16, 1929 (USA)
- Running time: 74 minutes
- Country: United States
- Language: English

The Locked Door is a 1929 American pre-Code drama film directed by George Fitzmaurice, and starring Rod LaRocque, Barbara Stanwyck, William "Stage" Boyd, and Betty Bronson. It is based on the 1919 play The Sign on the Door by Channing Pollock. The play was first adapted for the screen in 1921 as The Sign on the Door, starring Norma Talmadge. It was Stanwyck's first starring role and first talking film.

== Plot ==
The Locked Door (1929)

Ann Carter, an inexperienced young woman, accepts an invitation to dinner from her employer's son, Frank Devereaux. The date turns out to be far from what she expects. It is aboard a "rum boat", a ship sailing beyond the 12 mile limit to get around the restrictions of Prohibition. Worse, Frank turns out to be a cad. When she tries to leave, he locks the door and tries to force himself on her, tearing her dress. The ship drifts back into U.S. waters and a police raid stops him from going any further. When a photographer takes a picture of the two under arrest, Frank buys it from him.

Eighteen months later, Ann is happily married to wealthy Lawrence Reagan. They are about to celebrate their first wedding anniversary when Frank resurfaces in Ann's life, this time as the boyfriend of her naive young sister-in-law, Helen. Though both Ann and her husband tell Helen that Frank is bad, as Lawrence knows that Frank is having an affair with the wife of one of his friends, it is clear to Ann that Helen does not believe them.

Ann goes to the apartment to stop him from taking advantage of Helen. She hides when Lawrence shows up unexpectedly. He warns Frank to leave town before Lawrence's friend catches up with him and shoots him. Frank had already planned to go, but when Lawrence declares that he intends to administer a beating first, Frank draws a gun. He is shot in the ensuing struggle. Lawrence leaves without being seen, unaware that his wife has heard the whole thing. To protect her husband, Ann phones the switchboard operator and reenacts her earlier assault, ending with her firing two shots. When the police arrive, the district attorney soon pokes holes in her story. Also, the photograph is found, providing a motive for murder. However, Frank lives long enough to explain what happened, exonerating both Ann and Lawrence.

== Cast ==
- Rod LaRocque as Frank Devereaux
- Barbara Stanwyck as Ann Carter
- William "Stage" Boyd as Lawrence Reagan
- Betty Bronson as Helen Reagan
- Harry Stubbs as Waiter
- Harry Mestayer as District Attorney
- Mack Swain as Hotel Proprietor
- ZaSu Pitts as Telephone Girl
- George Bunny as Valet
- Purnell Pratt as Policeman (uncredited)
- Edgar Dearing as Policeman (uncredited)
- Lita Chevret as the Rumboat girl (uncredited)

== Censorship ==
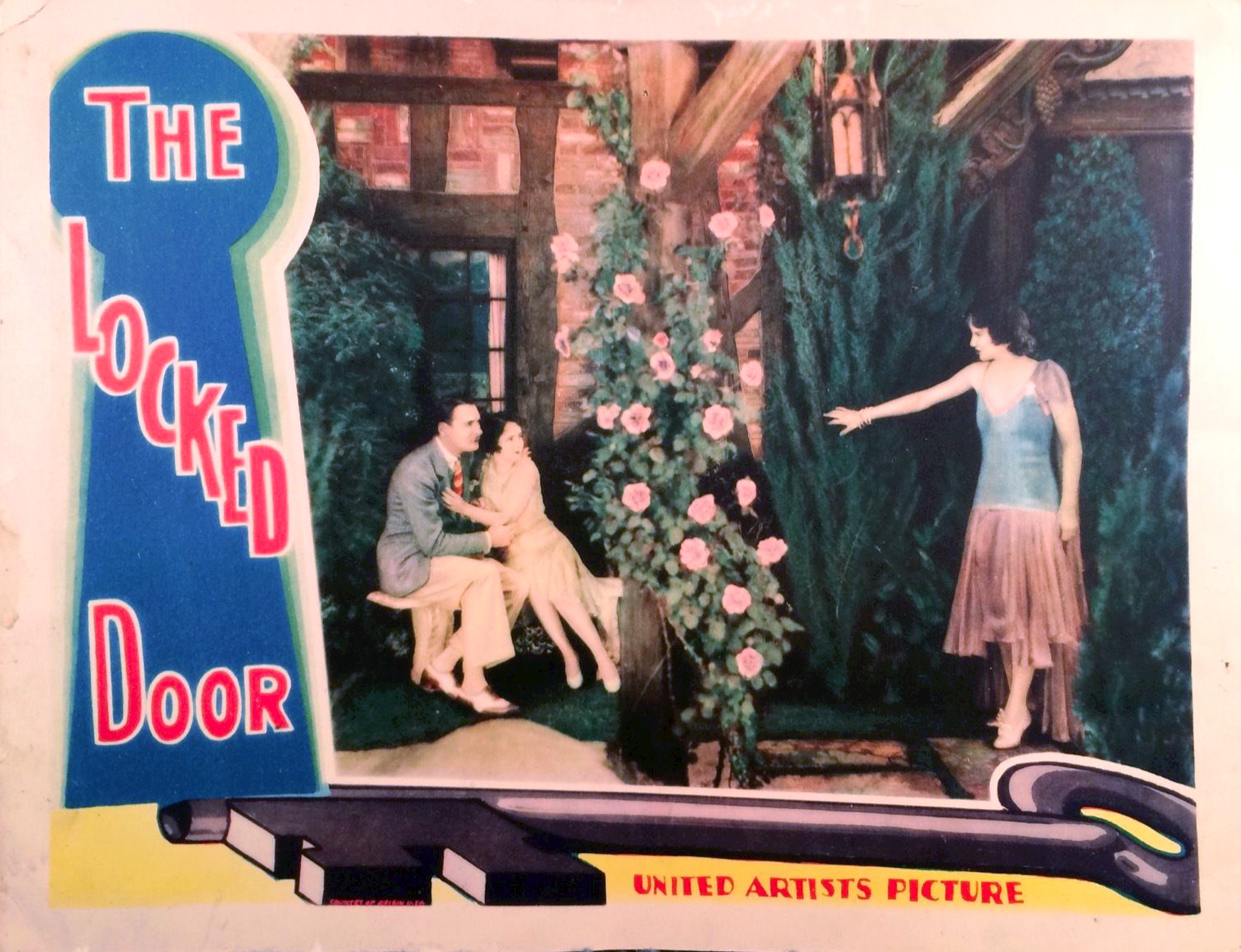
Lobby card

The Commonwealth Film Censorship Board refused to permit the film to be released in Australia, a decision upheld by the Censor Appeals Board. At the time, approximately half of all foreign films submitted were rejected by the Board.

== See also ==
- List of early sound feature films (1926–1929)
