= Arthur Loew Jr. =

American film producer

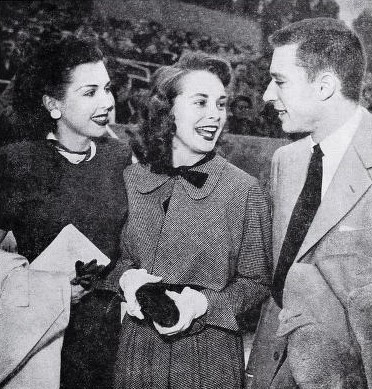
- Ann Miller, Janet Leigh and Arthur Loew Jr., 1949
- Born: December 26, 1925; New York City, New York, U.S.
- Died: November 10, 1995 (aged 69); Amado, Arizona, U.S.
- Occupation: Producer
- Spouse(s): Deborah Minardos Power (m. 1959; div. 1963) Regina Groves (m. 1966)
- Children: 5

Arthur Loew Jr. (December 26, 1925 – November 10, 1995) was an American film producer.

Loew was born in New York City. His maternal grandfather, Adolph Zukor, founded Paramount Pictures. His paternal grandfather, Marcus Loew, founded Metro-Goldwyn-Mayer Studios and Loew's Theatres, and his father, Arthur M. Loew, was a president of MGM's parent company.

He produced such films as The Affairs of Dobie Gillis and Penelope starring Natalie Wood.

Loew was romantically linked to many celebrities of his time, including Eartha Kitt, Joan Collins, and Elizabeth Taylor. He was known for his popular parties that were attended by stars like Dennis Hopper, Marlon Brando, James Dean, and Paul Newman and Joanne Woodward. In the 1950s he was briefly married to Deborah Minardos Power, who had previously been the wife of actors Nico Minardos and Tyrone Power.

Loew died of lung cancer in Amado, Arizona, at age 69.

== Filmography ==
- Penelope (producer)
- The Rack (1956) (producer)
- The Marauders (1955) (producer)
- The Affairs of Dobie Gillis (1953) (producer)
- Arena (1953) (producer)
- Teresa (1951) (producer)
