= New Morals for Old =

1932 film

- Theatrical release poster
- Directed by: Charles Brabin
- Written by: Zelda Sears (dialogue); Wanda Tuchock (additional dialogue)
- Based on: After All; 1930 play by John Van Druten
- Produced by: Harry Rapf
- Starring: Robert Young
- Cinematography: John J. Mescall
- Edited by: William S. Gray
- Production company: Metro-Goldwyn-Mayer
- Distributed by: Loew's Inc.
- Release date: June 4, 1932 (United States)
- Running time: 74 mins.
- Country: United States
- Language: English

New Morals for Old is a 1932 American pre-Code romance-drama film produced and distributed by MGM. It is based on the 1931 Broadway play After All, in which Humphrey Bogart had a significant role. Bogart's stage role is portrayed by David Newell in the film.

The film is noteworthy for having elements that would later be forbidden under the Motion Picture Production Code. There is very brief nudity, albeit in shadows and by a non-speaking character (the model in the painters' studio). Also, one of the female characters is in a relationship with a married man, and this is portrayed sympathetically.

== Plot ==
Mr. and Mrs. Thomas are affluent New Yorkers who are unhappy that their adult children, Ralph Thomas and Phyl Thomas, spend so many evenings at parties instead of spending time with family. Their disapproval deepens when they discover both children want to move out to pursue lifestyles that the parents deem unacceptable: Phyl moves into her own apartment so that she can conduct an affair with a married man, Duff Wilson. Her brother, Ralph, goes to Paris to pursue his dream of being a painter, thus disappointing his father who expected him to remain in the family wallpaper business. Mrs. Thomas repeatedly tries to invoke guilt in both children for not being with her, especially after Mr. Thomas dies of a stroke.

Eventually, Phyl marries her paramour and Ralph returns to New York, having failed as an artist. Mrs. Thomas dies shortly after Ralph's return. At the end of the film, Phyl, her twin infants, her husband Duff, and her brother Ralph are all living in the family home, with a newfound appreciation for the benefits of family life. In the film's last scene, Ralph and Duff are laughing together about how Phyl has evolved into a protective maternal figure, much like her own mother.

== Cast ==
- Robert Young as Ralph Thomas
- Margaret Perry as Phyl Thomas
- Lewis Stone as Mr. Thomas
- Laura Hope Crews as Mrs. Thomas
- Myrna Loy as Myra
- David Newell as Duff Wilson
- Jean Hersholt as James Hallett
- Ruth Selwyn as Estelle
- Kathryn Crawford as Zoe Atkinson
- Louise Closser Hale as Mrs. Warburton
- Mitchell Lewis as Bodwin
- Elizabeth Patterson as Aunty Doe

== Home media ==
New Morals for Old was released on DVD by the Warner Archive Collection. Laura Hope Crews's name is misspelled in MGM's original poster advertising and the film's opening credits.
