= William Slavens McNutt =

American screenwriter

- Born: September 12, 1885; Urbana, Illinois
- Died: January 25, 1938 (aged 52); San Fernando, California
- Occupation: Screenwriter
- Years active: 1922-1938

William Slavens McNutt (September 12, 1885 – January 25, 1938), was an American screenwriter. He wrote for 28 films between 1922 and 1939. He was nominated for an Academy Award on two occasions. At the 5th Academy Awards, he was nominated for the Academy Award for Best Story for Lady and Gent. In 1936, he was nominated for Adapted Screenplay for the film The Lives of a Bengal Lancer. He was born in Urbana, Illinois and died in San Fernando, California.

== Selected filmography ==
- The Wise Kid (1922)
- Tom Sawyer (1930)
- Dangerous Paradise (1930)
- Derelict (1930)
- Huckleberry Finn (1931)
- Lady and Gent (1932)
- The Lives of a Bengal Lancer (1935)

== Bibliography ==
- McNutt, William Slavens (1918). The Yanks are coming!. Boston: Page.
- — (April 25, 1925). "Too bad!". The New Yorker. Vol. 1, no. 10. pp. 20–21.
- — (May 2, 1925). "Sam Drebin". Profiles. The New Yorker. Vol. 1, no. 11. pp. 13–14.
- —; Jones, Grover (1930). Derelict : a stirring, dynamic rRomance. New York: Jacobsen-Hodgkinson.
- There Were Giants, a Story of Blood and Steel (A novel with Grover Jones; M.S. Mill, N.Y. (1939))
