= Rufus King (writer) =

American novelist

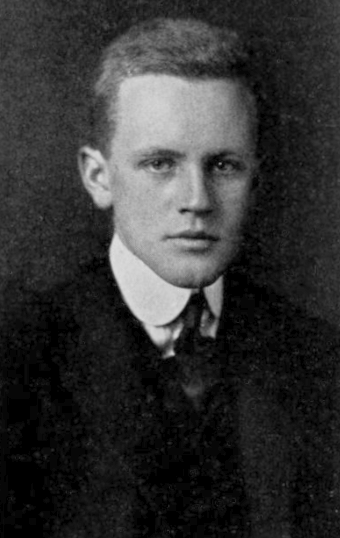
- At Yale in 1914
- Born: Rufus Frederick King; January 3, 1893; New York, New York, US
- Died: February 13, 1966 (aged 73); Hollywood, Florida, US
- Education: Yale University
- Occupation: Writer

Rufus Frederick King (January 3, 1893 – February 13, 1966) was an American author of whodunit crime novels. He created four series of detective stories: the first one with Reginald De Puyster, a sophisticated detective similar to Philo Vance; the second one with his more famous character, Lieutenant Valcour; the third with Colin Starr, who appeared in four stories in the Strand Magazine during 1940–1941; and the fourth with Chief Bill Dugan, who appeared in three stories in The Saint Mystery Magazine and Ellery Queen's Mystery Magazine 1956–1957.

== Biography ==
Rufus King was born in New York City on January 3, 1893.

He graduated from Yale University in 1914, where he was president of the dramatic association.

He died at his home in West Hollywood, Florida on February 13, 1966.

In 2014, Wildside Press purchased Rufus King's copyrights and began reissuing his work, starting with a collection of Chief Bill Duggan mystery short stories.

== Bibliography ==
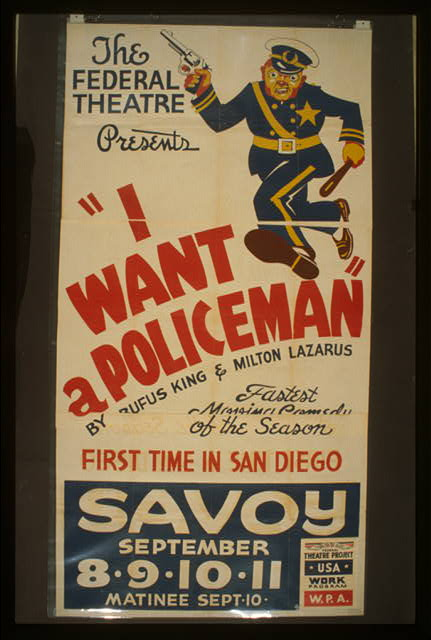
WPA poster with Rufus King credit, 1936-1941

- Murder De Luxe (1927)
- The Fatal Kiss Mystery (1928)
- Murder by the Clock (1929)
- A Woman is Dead (1929). Serialised, Burlington Free Press and other newspapers, 1931
- Murder by Latitude (1931)
- Murder in the Willet Family (1931)
- Murder on the Yacht (1932). Serialised, Burlington Free Press and other newspapers, 1933
- Valcour Meets Murder (1932)
- The Lesser Antilles Case (1934). Serialised, Los Angeles Times and other newspapers, 1934
- Profile of a Murder (1935)
- The Case of the Constant God (1938)
- Crime of Violence (1938)
- Murder Masks Miami (1939)
- Holiday Homicide (1941)
- Diagnosis Murder (1942)
- Design in Evil (1942)
- A Variety of Weapons (1943)
- The Deadly Dove (1945)
- The Case of the Dowager's Etchings (1946)
- Museum Piece No 13 (1946)
- Lethal Lady (1947)
- The Case of the Redoubled Cross (1949)
- Duenna to a Murder (1951)
- Malice in Wonderland (1958)
- The Steps to Murder (1960)
- The Faces of Danger (1964)
- Malice in Wonderland: The Adventures of Chief Bill Duggan (2015)
