= Made on Broadway =

1933 film by Harry Beaumont

- Directed by: Harry Beaumont
- Screenplay by: Courtney Terrett
- Based on: Public Relations by Courtney Terrett
- Starring: Robert Montgomery; Sally Eilers; Madge Evans; Eugene Pallette; C. Henry Gordon; Jean Parker
- Cinematography: Norbert Brodine
- Edited by: William S. Gray
- Production company: Metro-Goldwyn-Mayer
- Distributed by: Loew's Inc.
- Release date: May 19, 1933
- Running time: 68 minutes
- Country: United States
- Language: English

Made on Broadway is a 1933 American pre-Code comedy film directed by Harry Beaumont and written by Courtney Terrett. The film stars Robert Montgomery, Sally Eilers, Madge Evans, Eugene Pallette, C. Henry Gordon and Jean Parker. The film was released on May 19, 1933, by Metro-Goldwyn-Mayer.

== Plot ==
Jeff, The Broadway Fixer is a man about town and very popular with the ladies. One night, he sees a girl, Mona, jump from the Staten Island Ferry and he dives in after her. Not one to miss an opportunity, before they've been rescued from the drink, he's figuring a way to promote her as a celebrity. No longer despondent, Mona falls in with his scheme and she eagerly takes to her new notoriety Jeff falls in love with his creation, not realizing what a gold digger he has fostered. All the while, his ex wife, Claire, is on the sidelines. dressing and schooling his protege. He gets a call, in the middle of the night, that Mona has shot a man in her bedroom. Jeff rides to the rescue, concocts a story that they can sell to a jury and masterfully steers events to an acquittal. Not done, he destroys the letters that Mona had planned to use for blackmail and saves his favorite client from her clutches. He and ex wife are reunited.

== Cast ==
- Robert Montgomery as Jeff
- Sally Eilers as Mona
- Madge Evans as Claire
- Eugene Pallette as Terwilliger
- C. Henry Gordon as Mayor Starling
- Jean Parker as Adele
- Ivan Lebedeff as Ramon
- David Newell as Mayor's Secretary
- Vince Barnett as Mr. Lepedis
- Joseph Cawthorn as Schultz
