= The Midnight Warning =

1932 film

- Directed by: Spencer Gordon Bennet
- Written by: John T. Neville; Norman Battle
- Produced by: Cliff P. Broughton; George W. Weeks
- Starring: William "Stage" Boyd; Claudia Dell; Huntley Gordon
- Cinematography: Jules Cronjager
- Edited by: Byron Robinson
- Music by: Lee Zahler
- Production company: George W. Weeks Productions
- Distributed by: Mayfair Pictures
- Release date: November 15, 1932
- Running time: 63 minutes
- Country: United States
- Language: English

The Midnight Warning is a 1932 American mystery film directed by Spencer Gordon Bennet and starring William "Stage" Boyd, Claudia Dell and Huntley Gordon. The film is also known as Eyes of Mystery (new American title).

== Plot ==
A sister and brother check into a posh hotel. Shortly thereafter, the brother is missing, and despite the sister's inquiries, no one admits to ever having seen the man. Meanwhile, a sniper shoots bullets through the window of the room that the brother and sister stayed in. Is there any connection between these events? That's the mystery. It is based on the legend of the Vanishing Hotel Room.

== Cast ==
- William "Stage" Boyd as Thorwaldt Cornish
- Claudia Dell as Enid Van Buren
- Huntley Gordon as Mr. Gordon
- John Harron as Erich
- Hooper Atchley as Dr. Steven Walcott
- Lloyd Whitlock as Rankin
- Phillips Smalley as Dr. Bronson
- Lloyd Ingraham as Adolph Klein
- Henry Hall as Dr. Barris

== Bibliography ==
- George Eugene Turner & Michael H. Price. Forgotten Horrors: Early Talkie Chillers from Poverty Row. A. S. Barnes, 1979.
