= Fred M. Wilcox (director) =

American film director (1907–1964)

- Born: December 22, 1907; Tazewell, Virginia, United States
- Died: September 23, 1964 (aged 56); Beverly Hills, California, United States
- Occupation: Film director

Fred McLeod Wilcox (December 22, 1907 – September 23, 1964) was an American motion picture director. He worked for Metro-Goldwyn-Mayer for many years and is best remembered for directing Lassie Come Home (1943) and Forbidden Planet (1956). These films were entered in the National Film Preservation Board's National Film Registry in 1993 and 2013 respectively.

== Filmography ==
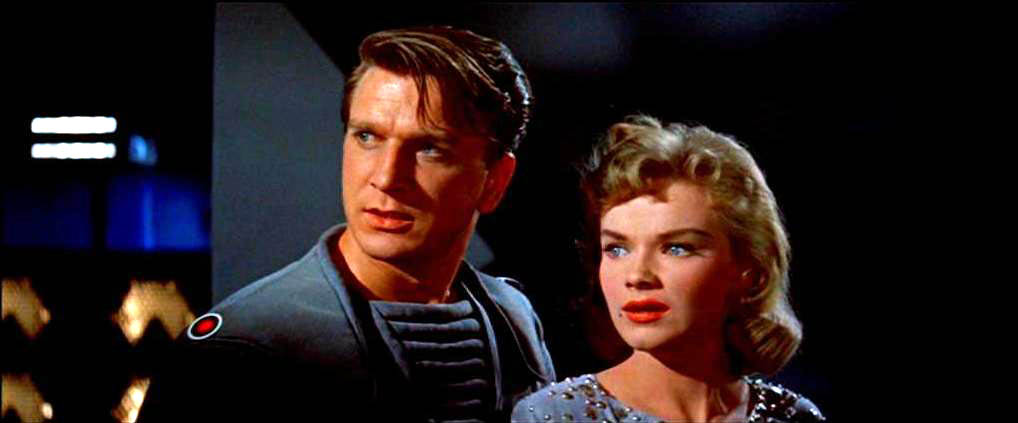
Screenshot of Leslie Nielsen and Anne Francis from the trailer of the motion picture Forbidden Planet.

- Joaquin Murrieta (1938)
- Lassie Come Home (1943)
- Courage of Lassie (1946)
- Three Daring Daughters (1948)
- Hills of Home (1948)
- The Secret Garden (1949)
- Shadow in the Sky (1952)
- Code Two (1953)
- Tennessee Champ (1954)
- Forbidden Planet (1956)
- I Passed for White (1960)
