= List of fiction works made into feature films (0–9, A–C) =

This is a list of works of fiction that have been made into feature films, from 0 to 9 and A to C. The title of the work and the year it was published are both followed by the work's author, the title of the film, and the year of the film. If a film has an alternate title based on geographical distribution, the title listed will be that of the widest distribution area.

== 0–9 ==
Fiction work(s)	Film adaptation(s)
The 25th Hour (2001), David Benioff	25th Hour (2002)
3 Assassins (グラスホッパー, Gurasuhoppā) (2004), Kōtarō Isaka	Grasshopper (2015)
4:50 from Paddington (1957), Agatha Christie	Murder, She Said (1961)
4:50 from Paddington (1957), Agatha Christie	Crime Is Our Business (French: Le Crime est notre affaire) (2008)
58 Minutes (1987), Walter Wager	Die Hard 2 (1990)
69 (シクスティナイン, Shikusutinain) (1987), Ryu Murakami	69 (2004)

== A ==
Fiction work(s)	Film adaptation(s)
The A.B.C. Murders (1936), Agatha Christie	The Alphabet Murders (1966)
À ton image (1998), Louise L. Lambrichs	À ton image (2004)
About a Boy (1998), Nick Hornby	About a Boy (2002)
About Schmidt (1996), Louis Begley	About Schmidt (2002)
Absolute Power (1996), David Baldacci	Absolute Power (1997)
The Accidental Tourist (1985), Anne Tyler	The Accidental Tourist (1988)
Across 110th (1970), Wally Ferris	Across 110th Street (1972)
Adam Resurrected (Hebrew: אדם בן כלב) (1969), Yoram Kaniuk	Adam Resurrected (2009)
Adams Fall (2000), Sean Desmond	Abandon (2002)
Addie Pray (1971), Joe David Brown	Paper Moon (1973)
Adiliya by the River (1999), Jin Renshun	Green Tea (2003)
Adolphe (1816), Benjamin Constant	Adolphe (2002)
Adventure (1911), Jack London	Adventure (1925)
The Adventurers (1966), Harold Robbins	The Adventurers (1970)
The Adventures of Captain Alatriste (Spanish: Las aventuras del capitán Alatriste) (1996–present) (series), Arturo Pérez-Reverte	Alatriste (2006)
The Adventures of Captain Hatteras (French: Voyages et aventures du capitaine Hatteras) (1866), Jules Verne	The Conquest of the Pole (French: Conquête du pôle) (1912)
The Adventures of Hajji Baba of Ispahan (1824), James Justinian Morier	The Adventures of Hajji Baba (1954)
Adventures of Huckleberry Finn (1884), Mark Twain	Huckleberry Finn (1920)
Adventures of Huckleberry Finn (1884), Mark Twain	Huckleberry Finn (1931)
Adventures of Huckleberry Finn (1884), Mark Twain	Huck Finn (1937)
Adventures of Huckleberry Finn (1884), Mark Twain	The Adventures of Huckleberry Finn (1939)
Adventures of Huckleberry Finn (1884), Mark Twain	The Adventures of Huckleberry Finn (1955) (Note: Television film.)
Adventures of Huckleberry Finn (1884), Mark Twain	The Adventures of Huckleberry Finn (1960)
Adventures of Huckleberry Finn (1884), Mark Twain	Huckleberry Finn (1974)
Adventures of Huckleberry Finn (1884), Mark Twain	Hopelessly Lost (1972)
Adventures of Huckleberry Finn (1884), Mark Twain	Huckleberry Finn (1975)
Adventures of Huckleberry Finn (1884), Mark Twain	The Adventures of Huckleberry Finn (1981)
Adventures of Huckleberry Finn (1884), Mark Twain	Adventures of Huckleberry Finn (1985)
Adventures of Huckleberry Finn (1884), Mark Twain	The Adventures of Mark Twain (1985)
Adventures of Huckleberry Finn (1884), Mark Twain	The Adventures of Huck Finn (1993)
Adventures of Huckleberry Finn (1884), Mark Twain	Huck and the King of Hearts (1994) (Note: Direct-to-video film.)
Adventures of Huckleberry Finn (1884), Mark Twain	The Adventures of Huck Finn (German: Die Abenteuer des Huck Finn) (2012)
The Adventures of Maya the Bee (German: Die Biene Maja und ihre Abenteuer) (1912), Waldemar Bonsels	The Adventures of Maya the Bee (1926)
The Adventures of Maya the Bee (German: Die Biene Maja und ihre Abenteuer) (1912), Waldemar Bonsels	Maya the Bee (2015)
The Adventures of Maya the Bee (German: Die Biene Maja und ihre Abenteuer) (1912), Waldemar Bonsels	Maya the Bee: The Honey Games (2018)
The Adventures of Maya the Bee (German: Die Biene Maja und ihre Abenteuer) (1912), Waldemar Bonsels	Maya the Bee: The Golden Orb (2021)
The Adventures of Pinocchio (Italian: Le avventure di Pinocchio. Storia di un burattino) (1883), Carlo Collodi	The Adventures of Pinocchio (1911)
The Adventures of Pinocchio (Italian: Le avventure di Pinocchio. Storia di un burattino) (1883), Carlo Collodi	The Adventures of Pinocchio (1936) (Note: Unfinished, considered a lost film.)
The Adventures of Pinocchio (Italian: Le avventure di Pinocchio. Storia di un burattino) (1883), Carlo Collodi	Pinocchio (1940)
The Adventures of Pinocchio (Italian: Le avventure di Pinocchio. Storia di un burattino) (1883), Carlo Collodi	The Adventures of Pinocchio (Italian: Le avventure di Pinocchio (1947)
The Adventures of Pinocchio (Italian: Le avventure di Pinocchio. Storia di un burattino) (1883), Carlo Collodi	Pinocchio (1957)
The Adventures of Pinocchio (Italian: Le avventure di Pinocchio. Storia di un burattino) (1883), Carlo Collodi	Pinocchio in Outer Space (1965)
The Adventures of Pinocchio (Italian: Le avventure di Pinocchio. Storia di un burattino) (1883), Carlo Collodi	Pinocchio (German: Turlis Abenteuer) (1967)
The Adventures of Pinocchio (Italian: Le avventure di Pinocchio. Storia di un burattino) (1883), Carlo Collodi	Pinocchio (1968)
The Adventures of Pinocchio (Italian: Le avventure di Pinocchio. Storia di un burattino) (1883), Carlo Collodi	The Adventures of Pinocchio (Italian: Un burattino di nome Pinocchio) (1972)
The Adventures of Pinocchio (Italian: Le avventure di Pinocchio. Storia di un burattino) (1883), Carlo Collodi	Pinocchio (1976)
The Adventures of Pinocchio (Italian: Le avventure di Pinocchio. Storia di un burattino) (1883), Carlo Collodi	Pinocchio's Christmas (1980)
The Adventures of Pinocchio (Italian: Le avventure di Pinocchio. Storia di un burattino) (1883), Carlo Collodi	The Adventures of Pinocchio (1984)
The Adventures of Pinocchio (Italian: Le avventure di Pinocchio. Storia di un burattino) (1883), Carlo Collodi	Pinocchio and the Emperor of the Night (1987)
The Adventures of Pinocchio (Italian: Le avventure di Pinocchio. Storia di un burattino) (1883), Carlo Collodi	Pinocchio (1993)
The Adventures of Pinocchio (Italian: Le avventure di Pinocchio. Storia di un burattino) (1883), Carlo Collodi	The Adventures of Pinocchio (1996)
The Adventures of Pinocchio (Italian: Le avventure di Pinocchio. Storia di un burattino) (1883), Carlo Collodi	The New Adventures of Pinocchio (1999)
The Adventures of Pinocchio (Italian: Le avventure di Pinocchio. Storia di un burattino) (1883), Carlo Collodi	Pinocchio, ovvero lo spettacolo della Provvidenza (1999)
The Adventures of Pinocchio (Italian: Le avventure di Pinocchio. Storia di un burattino) (1883), Carlo Collodi	Geppetto (2000)
The Adventures of Pinocchio (Italian: Le avventure di Pinocchio. Storia di un burattino) (1883), Carlo Collodi	Pinocchio (2002)
The Adventures of Pinocchio (Italian: Le avventure di Pinocchio. Storia di un burattino) (1883), Carlo Collodi	Pinocchio 3000 (2004)
The Adventures of Pinocchio (Italian: Le avventure di Pinocchio. Storia di un burattino) (1883), Carlo Collodi	Welcome Back Pinocchio (Italian: Bentornato Pinocchio) (2007)
The Adventures of Pinocchio (Italian: Le avventure di Pinocchio. Storia di un burattino) (1883), Carlo Collodi	Pinocchio (2008)
The Adventures of Pinocchio (Italian: Le avventure di Pinocchio. Storia di un burattino) (1883), Carlo Collodi	Pistachio – The Little Boy That Woodn't (2010)
The Adventures of Pinocchio (Italian: Le avventure di Pinocchio. Storia di un burattino) (1883), Carlo Collodi	Pinocchio (2012)
The Adventures of Pinocchio (Italian: Le avventure di Pinocchio. Storia di un burattino) (1883), Carlo Collodi	Pinocchio (2019)
The Adventures of Pinocchio (Italian: Le avventure di Pinocchio. Storia di un burattino) (1883), Carlo Collodi	Pinocchio: A True Story (2022)
The Adventures of Pinocchio (Italian: Le avventure di Pinocchio. Storia di un burattino) (1883), Carlo Collodi	Pinocchio (2022) (Note: Remake of the Disney film.)
The Adventures of Pinocchio (Italian: Le avventure di Pinocchio. Storia di un burattino) (1883), Carlo Collodi	Guillermo del Toro's Pinocchio (2022)
The Adventures of Pinocchio (Italian: Le avventure di Pinocchio. Storia di un burattino) (1883), Carlo Collodi	Pinocchio Unstrung (2026)
The Adventures of Sherlock Holmes (serialised 1891–1892, published as a book 1892), Arthur Conan Doyle	Sherlock Holmes (1916)
The Adventures of Sherlock Holmes (serialised 1891–1892, published as a book 1892), Arthur Conan Doyle	Sherlock Holmes (1922)
The Adventures of Sherlock Holmes (serialised 1891–1892, published as a book 1892), Arthur Conan Doyle	The Speckled Band (1931)
The Adventures of Sherlock Holmes (serialised 1891–1892, published as a book 1892), Arthur Conan Doyle	The Adventures of Sherlock Holmes (1939)
The Adventures of Sherlock Holmes (serialised 1891–1892, published as a book 1892), Arthur Conan Doyle	The House of Fear (1945)
The Adventures of Sherlock Holmes (serialised 1891–1892, published as a book 1892), Arthur Conan Doyle	The Blue Carbuncle (Russian: Голубой карбункул) (1980)
The Adventures of Tom Sawyer (1876), Mark Twain	Tom Sawyer (1917)
The Adventures of Tom Sawyer (1876), Mark Twain	Huck and Tom (1918)
The Adventures of Tom Sawyer (1876), Mark Twain	Tom Sawyer (1930)
The Adventures of Tom Sawyer (1876), Mark Twain	Tom Sawyer (1936)
The Adventures of Tom Sawyer (1876), Mark Twain	The Adventures of Tom Sawyer (1938)
The Adventures of Tom Sawyer (1876), Mark Twain	Tom Sawyer, Detective (1938)
The Adventures of Tom Sawyer (1876), Mark Twain	The Adventures of Mark Twain (1944)
The Adventures of Tom Sawyer (1876), Mark Twain	Dobrodružství Toma Sawyera (1967)
The Adventures of Tom Sawyer (1876), Mark Twain	Aventurile lui Tom Sawyer (1968)
The Adventures of Tom Sawyer (1876), Mark Twain	Moartea lui Joe Indianul (1968)
The Adventures of Tom Sawyer (1876), Mark Twain	Las Aventuras de Juliancito (1969)
The Adventures of Tom Sawyer (1876), Mark Twain	Tom Sawyer (1973)
The Adventures of Tom Sawyer (1876), Mark Twain	Mark Twain's Tom Sawyer (1973)
The Adventures of Tom Sawyer (1876), Mark Twain	Páni kluci (1976)
The Adventures of Tom Sawyer (1876), Mark Twain	Rascals and Robbers: The Secret Adventures of Tom Sawyer and Huckleberry Finn (1982)
The Adventures of Tom Sawyer (1876), Mark Twain	Sawyer and Finn (1983)
The Adventures of Tom Sawyer (1876), Mark Twain	Tom Sawyer (1984)
The Adventures of Tom Sawyer (1876), Mark Twain	The Adventures of Mark Twain (1985)
The Adventures of Tom Sawyer (1876), Mark Twain	The Adventures of Tom Sawyer (1986)
The Adventures of Tom Sawyer (1876), Mark Twain	Back to Hannibal: The Return of Tom Sawyer and Huckleberry Finn (1990)
The Adventures of Tom Sawyer (1876), Mark Twain	Tom and Huck (1995)
The Adventures of Tom Sawyer (1876), Mark Twain	The Animated Adventures of Tom Sawyer (1998)
The Adventures of Tom Sawyer (1876), Mark Twain	The Modern Adventures of Tom Sawyer (1998)
The Adventures of Tom Sawyer (1876), Mark Twain	Tom Sawyer (2000)
The Adventures of Tom Sawyer (1876), Mark Twain	Tom Sawyer (2011)
The Adventures of Tom Sawyer (1876), Mark Twain	Tom and Huck (German: Tom und Hacke) (2012)
The Adventures of Tom Sawyer (1876), Mark Twain	Tom Sawyer & Huckleberry Finn (2014)
The Adventures of Tom Sawyer (1876), Mark Twain	Band of Robbers (2015)
The Adventures of Tom Sawyer (1876), Mark Twain	The Adventures of Thomasina Sawyer (2018)
The Adventures of Tom Sawyer (1876), Mark Twain	The Science Adventures of Tom & Huck (2025)
Advise and Consent (1959), Allen Drury	Advise & Consent (1962)
Aelita (1923) (a. k. a. Aelita or, The Decline of Mars), Alexei Tolstoy	Aelita (1924)
The African Queen (1935), C. S. Forester	The African Queen (1951)
After (2014), Anna Todd	After (2019)
After Dark, My Sweet (1955), Jim Thompson	After Dark, My Sweet (1990)
After Ever Happy (2015), Anna Todd	After Ever Happy (2022)
After Everything (2015), Anna Todd	After Everything (2023)
After Hours (1979), Edwin Torres	Carlito's Way (1993)
After the Funeral (1953), Agatha Christie	Murder at the Gallop (1963)
After We Collided (2014), Anna Todd	After We Collided (2020)
After We Fell (2014), Anna Todd	After We Fell (2021)
The Age of Innocence (1920), Edith Wharton	The Age of Innocence (1924)
The Age of Innocence (1920), Edith Wharton	The Age of Innocence (1934)
The Age of Innocence (1920), Edith Wharton	The Age of Innocence (1993)
The Agony and the Ecstasy (1961), Irving Stone	The Agony and the Ecstasy (1965)
Aimez-vous Brahms? (1959), Françoise Sagan	Goodbye Again (1961)
Aimez-vous Brahms? (1959), Françoise Sagan	Jahan Tum Le Chalo (1999)
Airborn (2004), Kenneth Oppel	Airborn (2012)
Airport (1968), Arthur Hailey	Airport (1970)
Airport (1968), Arthur Hailey	Airport 1975 (1975)
Airport (1968), Arthur Hailey	Airport '77 (1977)
Airport (1968), Arthur Hailey	The Concorde ... Airport '79 (1979)
Alice Adams (1921), Booth Tarkington	Alice Adams (1923)
Alice Adams (1921), Booth Tarkington	Alice Adams (1935)
All Fall Down (1960), James Leo Herlihy	All Fall Down (1962)
All Men Are Mortal (French: Tous les hommes sont mortels) (1946), Simone de Beauvoir	All Men Are Mortal (1995)
All Quiet on the Western Front (German: Im Westen nichts Neues) (1929), Erich Maria Remarque	All Quiet on the Western Front (1930)
All Quiet on the Western Front (German: Im Westen nichts Neues) (1929), Erich Maria Remarque	All Quiet on the Western Front (1979)
All Quiet on the Western Front (German: Im Westen nichts Neues) (1929), Erich Maria Remarque	All Quiet on the Western Front (2022)
All She Was Worth (火車, Kasha) (1992), Miyuki Miyabe	Kasha: Kâdo hasan no onna! (1994)
All She Was Worth (火車, Kasha) (1992), Miyuki Miyabe	Helpless (Korean: 화차, romanized: Hwacha) (2012)
All the Brothers Were Valiant (1919), Ben Ames Williams	All the Brothers Were Valiant (1923)
All the Brothers Were Valiant (1919), Ben Ames Williams	Across to Singapore (1928)
All the Brothers Were Valiant (1919), Ben Ames Williams	All the Brothers Were Valiant (1953)
All the King's Men (1946), Robert Penn Warren	All the King's Men (1949)
All the King's Men (1946), Robert Penn Warren	All the King's Men (2006)
All the Pretty Horses (1992), Cormac McCarthy	All the Pretty Horses (2000)
All the Way (2001), Andy Behrens	Sex Drive (2008)
All You Need Is Kill (2009), Hiroshi Sakurazaka	Edge of Tomorrow (2014)
Allan Quatermain (1887), Sir H. Rider Haggard	Allan Quatermain and the Lost City of Gold (1987)
Almayer's Folly (1895), Joseph Conrad	Hanyut (2011)
Almayer's Folly (1895), Joseph Conrad	Almayer's Folly (2011)
Almost Transparent Blue (限りなく透明に近いブルー, Kagirinaku Tōmei ni Chikai Burū) (1976), Ryū Murakami	Almost Transparent Blue (1979)
Along Came a Spider (1993), James Patterson	Along Came a Spider (2001)
Altered States (1978), Paddy Chayefsky	Altered States (1980)
Always Another Dawn (1948), Zelma Roberts	Always Another Dawn (1948)
Always Outnumbered, Always Outgunned (1987), Walter Mosley	Always Outnumbered (1998)
The Alzheimer Case (Dutch: De zaak Alzheimer) (2000), Jef Geeraerts	The Alzheimer Case (2003)
The Alzheimer Case (Dutch: De zaak Alzheimer) (2000), Jef Geeraerts	Memory (2022)
The Amateur (Spanish: El Amateur) (1990), Mauricio Dayub	The Amateur (Spanish: El Amateur) (1999)
An American Dream (1965), Norman Mailer	An American Dream (1966)
American Knees (1995), Shawn Wong	Americanese (2006)
American Psycho (1991), Bret Easton Ellis	American Psycho (2000)
American Psycho (1991), Bret Easton Ellis	American Psycho 2: All-American Girl (2002)
American Splendor (1976–2008), Harvey Pekar	American Splendor (2003)
An American Tragedy (1925), Theodore Dreiser	A Place in the Sun (1951)
The Americanization of Emily (1959), William Bradford Huie	The Americanization of Emily (1964)
Amerika (1927), Franz Kafka	Klassenverhältnisse (Class Relations) (1984)
Amerika (1927), Franz Kafka	Intervista (1987)
Amerika (1927), Franz Kafka	Amerika (1994)
Les amitiés particulières (This Special Friendship) (1943), Roger Peyrefitte	Les amitiés particulières (1964)
The Amityville Horror (1977), Jay Anson	The Amityville Horror (1979)
The Amityville Horror (1977), Jay Anson	The Amityville Horror (2005)
Amos Judd (1895), John Ames Mitchell	The Young Rajah (1922)
Amu (2005), Shonali Bose	Amu (2005)
Anatomy of a Murder (1958), John D. Voelker (Note: Written as Robert Traver.)	Anatomy of a Murder (1959)
An Ancient Tale: A Novel in Polish History (Polish: Stara baśń. Powieść z dziejów Polski) (1876), Józef Ignacy Kraszewski	An Ancient Tale: When the Sun Was a God (Polish: Stara baśń: Kiedy słońce było bogiem) (2003)
And Now Tomorrow (1942), Rachel Field	And Now Tomorrow (1944)
And Then There Were None (1939), Agatha Christie	And Then There Were None (1945)
And Then There Were None (1939), Agatha Christie	Ten Little Indians (1959)
And Then There Were None (1939), Agatha Christie	Gumnaam (1965)
And Then There Were None (1939), Agatha Christie	Ten Little Indians (1965)
And Then There Were None (1939), Agatha Christie	Zehn kleine Negerlein (1969)
And Then There Were None (1939), Agatha Christie	And Then There Were None (1974)
And Then There Were None (1939), Agatha Christie	Desyat Negrityat (1987)
And Then There Were None (1939), Agatha Christie	Ten Little Indians (1989)
And Then There Were None (1939), Agatha Christie	Identity (2003)
The Anderson Tapes (1969), Lawrence Sanders	The Anderson Tapes (1971)
Andromeda: A Space-Age Tale (1957), Ivan Yefremov	The Andromeda Nebula (1967)
The Andromeda Strain (1969), Michael Crichton	The Andromeda Strain (1971)
Angel (1957), Elizabeth Taylor	Angel (2007)
Angel Square (1987), Brian Doyle	Angel Square (1990)
Angélique (1957–2012) (series), Anne Golon and Serge Golon	Angélique, Marquise des Anges (1964)
Angélique (1957–2012) (series), Anne Golon and Serge Golon	Marvelous Angelique (1965)
Angélique (1957–2012) (series), Anne Golon and Serge Golon	Angelique and the King (1966)
Angélique (1957–2012) (series), Anne Golon and Serge Golon	Untamable Angelique (1967)
Angélique (1957–2012) (series), Anne Golon and Serge Golon	Angelique and the Sultan (1968)
Angels & Demons (2000), Dan Brown	Angels & Demons (2009)
Anglo-Saxon Attitudes (1956), Angus Wilson	Anglo-Saxon Attitudes (1992)
The Angry Hills (1955), Leon Uris	The Angry Hills (1959)
Anime Supremacy! (ハケンアニメ!, Haken Anime!) (2014), Mizuki Tsujimura	Anime Supremacy! (2022)
Anna and the King of Siam (1944), Margaret Landon	Anna and the King of Siam (1946)
Anna and the King of Siam (1944), Margaret Landon	The King and I (1956)
Anna and the King of Siam (1944), Margaret Landon	The King and I (1999)
Anna and the King of Siam (1944), Margaret Landon	Anna and the King (1999)
Anna Karenina (serialised 1873–1887, published as a book 1888), Leo Tolstoy	Anna Karenina (1914)
Anna Karenina (serialised 1873–1887, published as a book 1888), Leo Tolstoy	Anna Karenina (1915)
Anna Karenina (serialised 1873–1887, published as a book 1888), Leo Tolstoy	Love (1927)
Anna Karenina (serialised 1873–1887, published as a book 1888), Leo Tolstoy	Anna Karenina (1935)
Anna Karenina (serialised 1873–1887, published as a book 1888), Leo Tolstoy	Anna Karenina (1948)
Anna Karenina (serialised 1873–1887, published as a book 1888), Leo Tolstoy	The River of Love (Arabic: نهر الحب, romanized: Nahr al-Ḥub) (1960)
Anna Karenina (serialised 1873–1887, published as a book 1888), Leo Tolstoy	Anna Karenina (1967)
Anna Karenina (serialised 1873–1887, published as a book 1888), Leo Tolstoy	Anna Karenina (1974)
Anna Karenina (serialised 1873–1887, published as a book 1888), Leo Tolstoy	Anna Karenina (1985)
Anna Karenina (serialised 1873–1887, published as a book 1888), Leo Tolstoy	Anna Karenina (1997)
Anna Karenina (serialised 1873–1887, published as a book 1888), Leo Tolstoy	Anna Karenina (2005)
Anna Karenina (serialised 1873–1887, published as a book 1888), Leo Tolstoy	Anna Karenina (2012)
Anna to the Infinite Power (1979), Mildred Ames	Anna to the Infinite Power (1983)
Anne of Avonlea (1909), Lucy Maud Montgomery	Anne of Avonlea (1987)
Anne of Green Gables (1908), Lucy Maud Montgomery	Anne of Green Gables (1919)
Anne of Green Gables (1908), Lucy Maud Montgomery	Anne of Green Gables (1934)
Anne of Green Gables (1908), Lucy Maud Montgomery	Anne of Green Gables (1956)
Anne of Green Gables (1908), Lucy Maud Montgomery	Anne of Green Gables (1985)
Anne of Green Gables (1908), Lucy Maud Montgomery	Anne of Green Gables: The Continuing Story (2000)
Anne of Green Gables (1908), Lucy Maud Montgomery	Anne of Green Gables: A New Beginning (2009)
Anne of Windy Poplars (1936), Lucy Maud Montgomery	Anne of Windy Poplars (1940)
Annihilation (2014), Jeff VanderMeer	Annihilation (2018)
The Anointed (1937), Clyde Brion Davis	Adventure (1945)
Another (アナザー, Anazā) (2009), Yukito Ayatsuji	Another (2012)
Anthony Adverse (1933), Hervey Allen	Anthony Adverse (1936)
Antikiller (Russian: Антикиллер) (1999), Daniil Koretsky	Antikiller (2002)
Antonieta (1978), Andrés Henestrosa	Antonieta (1982)
Apache Rising (1957), Marvin H. Albert	Duel at Diablo (1966)
The Apocalypse Watch (1995), Robert Ludlum	The Apocalypse Watch (1997)
The Apple Dumpling Gang (1971), Jack Bickham	The Apple Dumpling Gang (1975)
The Apple Dumpling Gang (1971), Jack Bickham	The Apple Dumpling Gang Rides Again (1979)
The Apple Dumpling Gang (1971), Jack Bickham	Tales from the Apple Dumpling Gang (1982)
Appointment with Death (1938), Agatha Christie	Appointment with Death (1988)
Appointment with Venus (1951), Jerrard Tickell	Appointment with Venus (1951)
The Apprenticeship of Duddy Kravitz (1959), Mordecai Richler	The Apprenticeship of Duddy Kravitz (1974)
The Army of Shadows (French: L'Armée des ombres) (1943), Joseph Kessel	Army of Shadows (French: L'Armée des ombres) (1969)
Around the World in Eighty Days (French: Le tour du monde en quatre-vingts jours) (1873), Jules Verne	Die Jagd nach der Hundertpfundnote oder Die Reise um die Welt (1913)
Around the World in Eighty Days (French: Le tour du monde en quatre-vingts jours) (1873), Jules Verne	'Round the World in 80 Days (1914)
Around the World in Eighty Days (French: Le tour du monde en quatre-vingts jours) (1873), Jules Verne	Around the World in Eighty Days (1919)
Around the World in Eighty Days (French: Le tour du monde en quatre-vingts jours) (1873), Jules Verne	Around the World in 80 Days (1956)
Around the World in Eighty Days (French: Le tour du monde en quatre-vingts jours) (1873), Jules Verne	The Three Stooges Go Around the World in a Daze (1963)
Around the World in Eighty Days (French: Le tour du monde en quatre-vingts jours) (1873), Jules Verne	Around the World in Eighty Days (1972; Australian)
Around the World in Eighty Days (French: Le tour du monde en quatre-vingts jours) (1873), Jules Verne	Around the World in Eighty Days (1972; Canadian)
Around the World in Eighty Days (French: Le tour du monde en quatre-vingts jours) (1873), Jules Verne	Around the World in 80 Days (1988)
Around the World in Eighty Days (French: Le tour du monde en quatre-vingts jours) (1873), Jules Verne	Around the World in 80 Days (German: Reise um die Erde in 80 Tagen) (1998)
Around the World in Eighty Days (French: Le tour du monde en quatre-vingts jours) (1873), Jules Verne	Tweety's High-Flying Adventure (2000)
Around the World in Eighty Days (French: Le tour du monde en quatre-vingts jours) (1873), Jules Verne	Globehunters: An Around the World in 80 Days Adventure (2002)
Around the World in Eighty Days (French: Le tour du monde en quatre-vingts jours) (1873), Jules Verne	Around the World in 80 Days (2004)
Around the World in Eighty Days (French: Le tour du monde en quatre-vingts jours) (1873), Jules Verne	Around the World in 80 Days (2021)
Arouse and Beware (1936), MacKinlay Kantor	The Man from Dakota (1940)
Arrowsmith (1925), Sinclair Lewis	Arrowsmith (1931)
Ashes and Diamonds (Polish: Popiół i diament) (1948), Jerzy Andrzejewski	Ashes and Diamonds (1958)
Ask the Dust (1939), John Fante	Ask the Dust (2006)
Asking for Trouble (2001), Elizabeth Young	The Wedding Date (2005)
The Asphalt Jungle (1949), W. R. Burnett	The Asphalt Jungle (1950)
The Asphalt Jungle (1949), W. R. Burnett	The Badlanders (1959)
The Assassination Bureau, Ltd (1963), Jack London	The Assassination Bureau (1969)
The Assassination of Jesse James by the Coward Robert Ford (1983), Ron Hansen	The Assassination of Jesse James by the Coward Robert Ford (2007)
The Assault (Dutch: De Aanslag) (1982), Harry Mulisch	The Assault (1986)
L'Assommoir (1877), Émile Zola	Gervaise (1956)
The Astronauts (Polish: Astronauci) (1951), Stanisław Lem	First Spaceship on Venus (1960)
Asylum (1996), Patrick McGrath	Asylum (2005)
At Play in the Fields of the Lord (1965), Peter Matthiessen	At Play in the Fields of the Lord (1991)
At the Earth's Core (serialised 1914, published 1922), Edgar Rice Burroughs	At the Earth's Core (1976)
At the Étoile du Nord (French: L'Étoile du Nord) (1854), Georges Simenon	L'Etoile du Nord (1982)
Atlantis (1912), Gerhart Hauptmann	Atlantis (1913)
Atomised (French: Les Particules élémentaires) (1998), Michel Houellebecq	Atomised (2006)
Atomised (French: Les Particules élémentaires) (1998), Michel Houellebecq	The Elementary Particles (2021)
Atonement (2001), Ian McEwan	Atonement (2007)
Audrey Rose (1975), Frank De Felitta	Audrey Rose (1977)
The Auction Block (1914), Rex Beach	The Auction Block (1917)
The Auction Block (1914), Rex Beach	The Auction Block (1926)
Audition (オーディション, Ōdishon) (1997), Ryu Murakami	Audition (1999)
Auntie Mame (1955), Patrick Dennis	Auntie Mame (1958)
Avalon High (2005), Meg Cabot	Avalon High (2010)
The Aviator (1981), Ernest K. Gann	The Aviator (1985)
Away All Boats (1953), Kenneth M. Dodson	Away All Boats (1956)
An Awfully Big Adventure (1989), Beryl Bainbridge	An Awfully Big Adventure (1995)
The Ax (1997), Donald E. Westlake	The Axe (French: Le couperet) (2005)

== B ==
Fiction work(s)	Film adaptation(s)
Baby Love (1968), Tina Chad Christian	Baby Love (1968)
Babylon Babies (1999), Maurice Georges Dantec	Babylon A.D. (2008)
Back Street (1931), Fannie Hurst	Back Street (1932)
Back Street (1931), Fannie Hurst	Back Street (1941)
Back Street (1931), Fannie Hurst	Back Street (1961)
Back When We Were Grownups (2001), Anne Tyler	Back When We Were Grownups (2004)
Bad Girl (1928), Viña Delmar	Bad Girl (1931)
The Bad Seed (1954), William March	The Bad Seed (1956)
The Bad Seed (1954), William March	The Bad Seed (1985)
The Bad Seed (1954), William March	The Bad Seed (2018)
Baise-moi (1993), Virginie Despentes	Baise-moi (2000)
The Bait (1968), Dorothy Uhnak	The Bait (1973)
The Ballad of Cat Ballou (1956), Roy Chanslor	Cat Ballou (1965)
The Ballad of the Flim-Flam Man (1965), Guy Owen	The Flim-Flam Man (1967)
The Ballad of the Flim-Flam Man (1965), Guy Owen	The Flim-Flam Man (1969)
The Ballad of the Running Man (1961), Shelley Smith	The Running Man (1963)
Balzac and the Little Chinese Seamstress (French: Balzac et la petite tailleuse chinoise) (2000), Dai Sijie	Balzac and the Little Chinese Seamstress (2002)
Band of Angels (1955), Robert Penn Warren	Band of Angels (1957)
The Bandits of Bombay (Bengali: বোম্বাইয়ের বোম্বেটে, romanized: Bombaiyer Bombete) (1976), Satyajit Ray	Bombaiyer Bombete (2003)
Bank Shot (1972), Donald E. Westlake	Bank Shot (1974)
Banner in the Sky (1900), James Ramsey Ullman	Third Man on the Mountain (1959)
The Barefoot Mailman (1943), Theodore Pratt	The Barefoot Mailman (1951)
Basil of Baker Street (1958), Eve Titus	The Great Mouse Detective (1986)
Bastard Out of Carolina (1992), Dorothy Allison	Bastard Out of Carolina (1996)
Battle Cry (1953), Leon Uris	Battle Cry (1955)
The Battle of the Villa Fiorita (1963), Rumer Godden	The Battle of the Villa Fiorita (1965)
Battle Royale (Japanese: バトル・ロワイアル, romanized: Batoru Rowaiaru) (1999), Koushun Takami	Battle Royale (2000)
Battle Royale (Japanese: バトル・ロワイアル, romanized: Batoru Rowaiaru) (1999), Koushun Takami	Battle Royale II: Requiem (Japanese: バトル・ロワイアルII 鎮魂歌, romanized: Batoru Rowaiaru Tsū: "Rekuiemu") (2003)
Battlefield Earth (1982), L. Ron Hubbard	Battlefield Earth (2000)
Be Cool (1999), Elmore Leonard	Be Cool (2005)
Be Ready with Bells and Drums (1961), Elizabeth Kata	A Patch of Blue (1965)
Be Still, My Love (1947), June Truesdell	The Accused (1949)
The Beach (1996), Alex Garland	The Beach (2000)
Beaches (1985), Iris Rainer Dart	Beaches (1988)
The Beardless Warriors (1960), Richard Matheson	The Young Warriors (1967)
Beast (1991), Peter Benchley	The Beast (1996)
The Beast Master (1959), Andre Norton	The Beastmaster (1982)
The Beast Master (1959), Andre Norton	Beastmaster 2: Through the Portal of Time (1991)
The Beast Master (1959), Andre Norton	Beastmaster III: The Eye of Braxus (1996)
The Beast Must Die (1938), Cecil Day-Lewis (Note: Written as Nicholas Blake.)	The Beast Must Die (Spanish: La bestia debe morir) (1952)
The Beast Must Die (1938), Cecil Day-Lewis	This Man Must Die (French: Que la bête meure) (1969)
The Beast Within (1981), Edward Levy	The Beast Within (1982)
Beat the Devil (1951), Claud Cockburn (Note: Written as James Helvick.)	Beat the Devil (1953)
Beau Brocade (1907), Baroness Emmuska Orczy	Beau Brocade (1916)
Beau Geste (1924), P. C. Wren	Beau Geste (1926)
Beau Geste (1924), P. C. Wren	Beau Geste (1939)
Beau Geste (1924), P. C. Wren	Beau Geste (1966)
Beau Geste (1924), P. C. Wren	The Last Remake of Beau Geste (1977)
Beau Ideal (1927), P. C. Wren	Beau Ideal (1931)
Beau Sabreur (1926), P. C. Wren	Beau Sabreur (1928)
Beautiful Creatures (2009), Kami Garcia and Margaret Stohl	Beautiful Creatures (2013)
Bedelia (1945), Vera Caspary	Bedelia (1946)
Bee Season (2000), Myla Goldberg	Bee Season (2005)
Beer and Blood: The Story of a Couple o' Wrong Guys (1930), John Bright and Kubec Glasmon	The Public Enemy (1931)
Before the Fact (1932), Anthony Berkeley Cox (Note: Written as Francis Iles.)	Suspicion (1941)
The Beginning and the End (Arabic: بداية ونهاية, romanized: Bidaya wa Nihaya) (1960), Naguib Mahfouz	Bidaya wa Nihaya (1960)
The Beguiled (1966), Thomas P. Cullinan	The Beguiled (1971)
The Beguiled (1966), Thomas P. Cullinan	The Beguiled (2017)
Behind That Curtain (1928), Earl Derr Biggers	Behind That Curtain (1929)
Being There (1971), Jerzy Kosinski	Being There (1979)
Bel-Ami (1885), Guy de Maupassant	Bel Ami (1939)
Bel-Ami (1885), Guy de Maupassant	The Private Affairs of Bel Ami (1947)
Bel-Ami (1885), Guy de Maupassant	Bel Ami (2005)
Bel-Ami (1885), Guy de Maupassant	Bel Ami (2012)
Belle de Jour (1928), Joseph Kessel	Belle de Jour (1967)
Belli Moda (Kannada: ಬೆಳ್ಳಿಮೋಡ) (1961), Anasuya Shankar (Note: Written as Triveni.)	Belli Moda (1967)
Belli Moda (Kannada: ಬೆಳ್ಳಿಮೋಡ) (1961), Anasuya Shankar	Swapnabhoomi (Malayalam: സ്വപ്നഭൂമി) (1967)
Bellman and True (1975), Desmond Lowden	Bellman and True (1987)
Beloved (1987), Toni Morrison	Beloved (1998)
Belphégor (1927), Arthur Bernède	Belphégor - Le fantôme du Louvre (2001)
Ben-Hur: A Tale of the Christ (1880), Lew Wallace	Ben-Hur (1925)
Ben-Hur: A Tale of the Christ (1880), Lew Wallace	Ben-Hur (1959)
Ben-Hur: A Tale of the Christ (1880), Lew Wallace	Ben Hur (2003)
Ben-Hur: A Tale of the Christ (1880), Lew Wallace	Ben-Hur (2016)
Benjamin Blake (1941), Edison Marshall	Son of Fury: The Story of Benjamin Blake (1942)
Benjamin Blake (1941), Edison Marshall	Treasure of the Golden Condor (1953)
Beowulf (c. 700–1000 AD), unknown	Beowulf (1999)
Beowulf (c. 700–1000 AD), unknown	Beowulf & Grendel (2005)
Beowulf (c. 700–1000 AD), unknown	Beowulf (2007)
Berlin Alexanderplatz (1929), Alfred Döblin	Berlin — Alexanderplatz (1931)
Berlin Alexanderplatz (1929), Alfred Döblin	Berlin Alexanderplatz (2020)
La bestia nel cuore (Note: lit. 'The Beast in the Heart') (2003), Cristina Comencini	Don't Tell (Italian: La bestia nel cuore) (2005)
La Bête humaine (Note: lit. 'The Human Beast') (1890), Émile Zola	Die Bestie im Menschen (1921)
La Bête humaine (1890), Émile Zola	La Bête Humaine (1938)
La Bête humaine (1890), Émile Zola	Human Desire (1954)
La Bête humaine (1890), Émile Zola	La Bestia humana (1954)
La Bête humaine (1890), Émile Zola	Cruel Train (1995)
The Betsy (1971), Harold Robbins	The Betsy (1978)
Beyond the Forest: The Story of a Man and Woman Destroyed by Love (1948), Stuart D. Engstrand	Beyond the Forest (1949)
Beyond This Place (1953), A. J. Cronin	Sabar Uparey (1955)
Beyond This Place (1953), A. J. Cronin	Kala Pani (1958)
Beyond This Place (1953), A. J. Cronin	Beyond This Place (1959)
Beyond This Place (1953), A. J. Cronin	Poola Rangadu (1967)
Beyond This Place (1953), A. J. Cronin	En Annan (1970)
The BFG (1982), Roald Dahl	The BFG (1989)
The BFG (1982), Roald Dahl	The BFG (2016)
Bhowani Junction (1954), John Masters	Bhowani Junction (1956)
Bid Time Return (1975), Richard Matheson	Somewhere in Time (1980)
The Bilingual Lover (Spanish: El amante bilingüe) (1990), Juan Marsé	The Bilingual Lover (1993)
The Big Bounce (written 1966, published 1969), Elmore Leonard	The Big Bounce (1969)
The Big Bounce (written 1966, published 1969), Elmore Leonard	The Big Bounce (2004)
The Big Clock (1946), Kenneth Fearing	The Big Clock (1948)
The Big Clock (1946), Kenneth Fearing	No Way Out (1987)
Big Fish: A Novel of Mythic Proportions (1998), Daniel Wallace	Big Fish (2003)
The Big Fisherman (1948), Lloyd C. Douglas	The Big Fisherman (1959)
The Big Heat (1952), William P. McGivern	The Big Heat (1953)
Big Red (1945), Jim Kjelgaard	Big Red (1962)
The Big Sleep (1939), Raymond Chandler	The Big Sleep (1946)
The Big Sleep (1939), Raymond Chandler	The Big Sleep (1978)
Big Trouble (1999), Dave Barry	Big Trouble (2002)
Biggles (1932–1968) (series), W. E. Johns	Biggles: Adventures in Time (1986)
Billion-Dollar Brain (1966), Len Deighton	Billion Dollar Brain (1967)
Billy Bathgate (1989), E. L. Doctorow	Billy Bathgate (1991)
Billy Liar (1969), Keith Waterhouse	Billy Liar (1963)
Birdy (1978), William Wharton	Birdy (1984)
The Bishop's Wife (1928), Robert Nathan	The Bishop's Wife (1947)
The Bishop's Wife (1928), Robert Nathan	The Preacher's Wife (1996)
The Bitch (1979), Jackie Collins	The Bitch (1979)
Bitter Moon (French: Lunes de fiel) (1981), Pascal Bruckner	Bitter Moon (1992)
The Bitter Tea of General Yen (1932), Grace Zaring Stone	The Bitter Tea of General Yen (1933)
Black Alibi (1942), Cornell Woolrich	The Leopard Man (1943)
The Black Angel (1943), Cornell Woolrich	Black Angel (1946)
The Black Arrow: A Tale of the Two Roses (1888), Robert Louis Stevenson	The Black Arrow (1943)
The Black Arrow: A Tale of the Two Roses (1888), Robert Louis Stevenson	Black Arrow (1985)
The Black Arrow: A Tale of the Two Roses (1888), Robert Louis Stevenson	The Black Arrow (Russian: Чёрная стрела) (1987)
The Black Arrow: A Tale of the Two Roses (1888), Robert Louis Stevenson	The Black Arrow (1988)
Black Beauty (1877), Anna Sewell	Your Obedient Servant (1917)
Black Beauty (1877), Anna Sewell	Black Beauty (1921)
Black Beauty (1877), Anna Sewell	Black Beauty (1933)
Black Beauty (1877), Anna Sewell	Black Beauty (1946)
Black Beauty (1877), Anna Sewell	Courage of Black Beauty (1958)
Black Beauty (1877), Anna Sewell	Black Beauty (1971)
Black Beauty (1877), Anna Sewell	Black Beauty (1987)
Black Beauty (1877), Anna Sewell	Black Beauty (1994)
Black Beauty (1877), Anna Sewell	Black Beauty (1995)
Black Beauty (1877), Anna Sewell	Black Beauty (2020)
The Black Camel (1929), Earl Derr Biggers	The Black Camel (1931)
The Black Curtain (1941), Cornell Woolrich	Street of Chance (1942)
The Black Dahlia (1987), James Ellroy	The Black Dahlia (2006)
Black Narcissus (1939), Rumer Godden	Black Narcissus (1947)
The Black Path of Fear (1944), Cornell Woolrich	The Chase (1946)
Black Rain (黒い雨, Kuroi Ame) (1965), Masuji Ibuse	Black Rain (1989)
The Black Rose (1945), Thomas B. Costain	The Black Rose (1950)
The Black Stallion (1941–1989) (series) (Note: Works adapted from the series in chronological order: the first (The Black Stallion (1941)), the second (The Black Stallion Returns (1945)), and the twentieth (The Young Black Stallion (1989)) respectively.), Walter Farley	The Black Stallion (1979)
The Black Stallion (1941–1989) (series), Walter Farley	The Black Stallion Returns (1983)
The Black Stallion (1941–1989) (series), Walter Farley	The Young Black Stallion (2003)
Black Sunday (1971), Thomas Harris	Black Sunday (1977)
The Blackboard Jungle (1954), Evan Hunter	Blackboard Jungle (1955)
Blackbeard's Ghost (1965), Ben Stahl	Blackbeard's Ghost (1968)
The Blank Wall (1947), Elisabeth Sanxay Holding	The Reckless Moment (1949)
The Blank Wall (1947), Elisabeth Sanxay Holding	The Deep End (2001)
Blaze of Noon (1946), Ernest K. Gann	Blaze of Noon (1947)
Bleak House (serialised 1852–1853, published as a book 1853), Charles Dickens	Bleak House (1920)
Bleak House (serialised 1852–1853, published as a book 1853), Charles Dickens	Bleak House (1922)
Bless the Beasts and Children (1970), Glendon Swarthout	Bless the Beasts & Children (1971)
Bless the Child (1993), Cathy Cash Spellman	Bless the Child (2000)
The Blessing (1951), Nancy Mitford	Count Your Blessings (1959)
Blood and Chocolate (1997), Annette Curtis Klause	Blood & Chocolate (2007)
Blood and Sand (Spanish: Sangre y arena) (1908), Vicente Blasco Ibáñez	Blood and Sand (1916)
Blood and Sand (Spanish: Sangre y arena) (1908), Vicente Blasco Ibáñez	Blood and Sand (1922)
Blood and Sand (Spanish: Sangre y arena) (1908), Vicente Blasco Ibáñez	Blood and Sand (1941)
Blood and Sand (Spanish: Sangre y arena) (1908), Vicente Blasco Ibáñez	Blood and Sand (1989)
Blood Brother (1947), Elliott Arnold	Broken Arrow (1950)
Blood on the Moon (1984), James Ellroy	Cop (1988)
The Blood Oranges (1970), John Hawkes	The Blood Oranges (1997)
Blood Red Rivers (French: Les rivières pourpres) (1997), Jean-Christophe Grangé	The Crimson Rivers (2000)
Blood Red Rivers (French: Les rivières pourpres) (1997), Jean-Christophe Grangé	Crimson Rivers II: Angels of the Apocalypse (French: Les rivières pourpres II: Les anges de l'apocalypse) (2004)
Blood Work (1998), Michael Connelly	Blood Work (2002)
Blue Boy (French: Jean le Bleu) (1932), Jean Giono	The Baker's Wife (French: La femme du boulanger) (1938)
Blue Fin (1969), Colin Thiele	Blue Fin (1978)
The Blue Lagoon (1908), Henry De Vere Stacpoole	The Blue Lagoon (1923)
The Blue Lagoon (1908), Henry De Vere Stacpoole	The Blue Lagoon (1949)
The Blue Lagoon (1908), Henry De Vere Stacpoole	The Blue Lagoon (1980)
The Blue Lagoon (1908), Henry De Vere Stacpoole	Blue Lagoon: The Awakening (2012)
The Blue Room (French: La Chambre bleue) (1964), Georges Simenon	The Blue Room (Spanish: La habitación azul) (2002)
Blueprint (German: Blaupause) (1999), Charlotte Kerner	Blueprint (2003)
The Body (1983), Richard Sapir	The Body (2001)
The Body Snatchers (1955), Jack Finney	Invasion of the Body Snatchers (1956)
The Body Snatchers (1955), Jack Finney	Invasion of the Body Snatchers (1978)
The Body Snatchers (1955), Jack Finney	Body Snatchers (1993)
The Body Snatchers (1955), Jack Finney	The Invasion (2007)
The Body Snatchers (1955), Jack Finney	Invasion of the Pod People (2007)
Bomba, the Jungle Boy (1926), Roy Rockwood	Bomba, the Jungle Boy (1949)
The Bonfire of the Vanities (1987), Tom Wolfe	The Bonfire of the Vanities (1990)
Bonjour Tristesse (Note: lit. 'Hello Sadness') (1954), Françoise Sagan	Bonjour Tristesse (1958)
Bonjour Tristesse (1954), Françoise Sagan	Bonjour Tristesse (2024)
Boogiepop and Others (1998), Kouhei Kadono	Boogiepop and Others (2000)
The Book of Daniel (1971), E. L. Doctorow	Daniel (1983)
The Book of Magic (2021), Alice Hoffman	Practical Magic 2 (2026)
Das Boot (Note: lit. 'The Boat') (1973), Lothar-Günther Buchheim	Das Boot (1981)
The Border Jumpers (1955), Will C. Brown	Man of the West (1958)
The Border Legion (1916), Zane Grey	The Border Legion (1924)
The Border Legion (1916), Zane Grey	The Last Round-Up (1934)
Border Town (1934), Carroll Graham	Bordertown (1935)
The Borrowers (1952), Mary Norton	The Borrowers (1973)
The Borrowers (1952), Mary Norton	The Borrowers (1997)
The Borrowers (1952), Mary Norton	Arrietty (2010)
The Borrowers (1952), Mary Norton	The Borrowers (2011)
The Bostonians (serialised 1885–1886, published as a book 1886), Henry James	The Bostonians (1984)
Botchan (Japanese: 坊っちゃん) (1906), Natsume Sōseki	Botchan (1935)
Botchan (Japanese: 坊っちゃん) (1906), Natsume Sōseki	Botchan (1953)
Botchan (Japanese: 坊っちゃん) (1906), Natsume Sōseki	Botchan (1958)
Botchan (Japanese: 坊っちゃん) (1906), Natsume Sōseki	Botchan (1966)
Botchan (Japanese: 坊っちゃん) (1906), Natsume Sōseki	Botchan (1977)
Botchan (Japanese: 坊っちゃん) (1906), Natsume Sōseki	Botchan (1980)
Bourne (1980–2012) (series) (Note: Works adapted from the series in chronological order: The Bourne Identity (1980), The Bourne Supremacy (1986) The Bourne Ultimatum (1990) and The Bourne Legacy (2004) respectively.), Robert Ludlum and Eric Van Lustbader	The Bourne Identity (1988)
Bourne (1980–2012) (series), Robert Ludlum and Eric Van Lustbader	The Bourne Identity (2002)
Bourne (1980–2012) (series), Robert Ludlum and Eric Van Lustbader	The Bourne Supremacy (2004)
Bourne (1980–2012) (series), Robert Ludlum and Eric Van Lustbader	The Bourne Ultimatum (2007)
Bourne (1980–2012) (series), Robert Ludlum and Eric Van Lustbader	The Bourne Legacy (2012)
Bourne (1980–2012) (series), Robert Ludlum and Eric Van Lustbader	Jason Bourne (2016)
The Boy in the Striped Pyjamas (2006), John Boyne	The Boy in the Striped Pyjamas (2008)
Boy on a Dolphin (1955), David Divine	Boy on a Dolphin (1957)
The Boys from Brazil (1976), Ira Levin	The Boys from Brazil (1978)
The Bravados (1958), Frank O'Rourke	The Bravados (1958)
The Brave Bulls (1949), Thomas C. Lea III	The Brave Bulls (1951)
The Brave Cowboy (1956), Edward Abbey	Lonely Are the Brave (1962)
The Brave Little Toaster (1986), Thomas M. Disch	The Brave Little Toaster (1987)
The Brave Little Toaster (1986), Thomas M. Disch	The Brave Little Toaster to the Rescue (1997)
The Brave Little Toaster Goes to Mars (1988), Thomas M. Disch	The Brave Little Toaster Goes to Mars (1998)
Brave New World (1932), Aldous Huxley	Brave New World (1980)
Brave New World (1932), Aldous Huxley	Brave New World (1998)
Breakfast of Champions (1973), Kurt Vonnegut, Jr.	Breakfast of Champions (1999)
Breakfast on Pluto (1998), Patrick McCabe	Breakfast on Pluto (2005)
Breakfast with Scot (1999), Michael Downing	Breakfast with Scot (2007)
Breakheart Pass (1974), Alistair MacLean	Breakheart Pass (1975)
Breaking Smith's Quarter Horse (1966), Paul St. Pierre	Smith! (1969)
The Bride Wore Black (1940), Cornell Woolrich	The Bride Wore Black (1967)
Brideshead Revisited, The Sacred & Profane Memories of Captain Charles Ryder (1945), Evelyn Waugh	Brideshead Revisited (2008)
The Bridge of San Luis Rey (1927), Thornton Wilder	The Bridge of San Luis Rey (1929)
The Bridge of San Luis Rey (1927), Thornton Wilder	The Bridge of San Luis Rey (1944)
The Bridge of San Luis Rey (1927), Thornton Wilder	The Bridge of San Luis Rey (2004)
The Bridge over the River Kwai (French: Le Pont de la rivière Kwaï) (1952), Pierre Boulle	The Bridge on the River Kwai (1957)
Bridge to Terabithia (1977), Katherine Paterson	Bridge to Terabithia (1985)
Bridge to Terabithia (1977), Katherine Paterson	Bridge to Terabithia (2007)
The Bridges at Toko-Ri (1953), James A. Michener	The Bridges at Toko-Ri (1953)
The Bridges of Madison County (a. k. a. Love in Black and White) (1992), Robert James Waller	The Bridges of Madison County (1995)
Bridget Jones (1996–2016) (series) (Note: Works adapted from the series in chronological order: Bridget Jones's Diary (1996) and Bridget Jones: The Edge of Reason (1999) respectively.), Helen Fielding	Bridget Jones's Diary (2001)
Bridget Jones (1996–2016) (series), Helen Fielding	Bridget Jones: The Edge of Reason (2004)
Bridget Jones (1996–2016) (series), Helen Fielding	Bridget Jones's Baby (2016)
Bridget Jones (1996–2016) (series), Helen Fielding	Bridget Jones: Mad About the Boy (2025)
Bright Lights, Big City (1984), Jay McInerney	Bright Lights, Big City (1988)
Brighton Rock (1938), Graham Greene	Brighton Rock (1948)
Brighton Rock (1938), Graham Greene	Brighton Rock (2010)
Bringing Out the Dead (1998), Joe Connelly	Bringing Out the Dead (1999)
Broken April (1978), Ismail Kadare	Behind the Sun (Portuguese: Abril Despedaçado) (2001)
Brothers by Blood (Norwegian: Brødre i Blodet) (1996), Ingvar Ambjørnsen	Elling (2001)
Brothers by Blood (Norwegian: Brødre i Blodet) (1996), Ingvar Ambjørnsen	Mors Elling (2003)
Brothers by Blood (Norwegian: Brødre i Blodet) (1996), Ingvar Ambjørnsen	Elsk meg i morgen (2005)
Brothers in Law (1955), Henry Cecil	Brothers in Law (1957)
The Brothers Karamazov (Russian: Братья Карамазовы, romanized: Brat'ya Karamazovy) (1880), Fyodor Dostoyevsky	The Brothers Karamazov (German: Die Brüder Karamasoff) (1921)
The Brothers Karamazov (Russian: Братья Карамазовы, romanized: Brat'ya Karamazovy) (1880), Fyodor Dostoyevsky	The Brothers Karamazov (Italian: I fratelli Karamazoff) (1947)
The Brothers Karamazov (Russian: Братья Карамазовы, romanized: Brat'ya Karamazovy) (1880), Fyodor Dostoyevsky	The Brothers Karamazov (1958)
The Brothers Karamazov (Russian: Братья Карамазовы, romanized: Brat'ya Karamazovy) (1880), Fyodor Dostoyevsky	The Brothers Karamazov (1969)
The Brothers Karamazov (Russian: Братья Карамазовы, romanized: Brat'ya Karamazovy) (1880), Fyodor Dostoyevsky	The Karamazov Brothers (Czech: Karamazovi) (2008)
Brown's Requiem (1981), James Ellroy	Brown's Requiem (1998)
Buddwing (1964), Evan Hunter	Mister Buddwing (1966)
Buffalo Soldiers (1993), Robert O'Connor	Buffalo Soldiers (2003)
Bump in the Night (1988), Isabelle Holland	Bump in the Night (1991)
The Burglar in the Closet (1978), Lawrence Block	Burglar (1987)
The Burmese Harp (Japanese: ビルマの竪琴, romanized: Biruma no tategoto) (1946), Michio Takeyama	The Burmese Harp (1956)
The Burmese Harp (Japanese: ビルマの竪琴, romanized: Biruma no tategoto) (1946), Michio Takeyama	The Burmese Harp (1985)
The Burning Hills (1956), Louis L'Amour	The Burning Hills (1956)
The Burning Shore (1985), Wilbur Smith	Burning Shore (1991)
Burton and Speke (1982), William Harrison	Mountains of the Moon (1990)
The Busy Body (1966), Donald E. Westlake	The Busy Body (1967)
But Gentlemen Marry Brunettes (1927), Anita Loos	Gentlemen Marry Brunettes (1955)
BUtterfield 8 (1935), John O'Hara	BUtterfield 8 (1960)
By the Great Horn Spoon! (1963), Sid Fleischman	The Adventures of Bullwhip Griffin (1967)

== C ==
Fiction work(s)	Film adaptation(s)
The Caine Mutiny (1952), Herman Wouk	The Caine Mutiny (1954)
The Caine Mutiny (1952), Herman Wouk	The Caine Mutiny Court-Martial (1955)
The Caine Mutiny (1952), Herman Wouk	The Caine Mutiny Court-Martial (1988)
The Caine Mutiny (1952), Herman Wouk	The Caine Mutiny Court-Martial (2023)
Cal (1983), Bernard MacLaverty	Cal (1984)
Call for the Dead (1961), John le Carré	The Deadly Affair (1966)
Call It Treason (1949), George L. Howe	Decision Before Dawn (1951)
Call Me By Your Name (2007), André Aciman	Call Me By Your Name (2017)
The Call of the Wild (1903), Jack London	The Call of the Wild (1923)
The Call of the Wild (1903), Jack London	Call of the Wild (1935)
The Call of the Wild (1903), Jack London	The Call of the Wild (1972)
The Call of the Wild (1903), Jack London	The Great Adventure (Italian: Il richiamo del lupo) (1975)
The Call of the Wild (1903), Jack London	The Call of the Wild (1976)
The Call of the Wild (1903), Jack London	The Call of the Wild: Howl, Buck (荒野の叫び声 吠えろバック, Kōya no Sakebigoe: Hoero Bakku) (1981)
The Call of the Wild (1903), Jack London	The Call of the Wild (1990)
The Call of the Wild (1903), Jack London	Buck at the Edge of Heaven (Italian: Buck ai confini del cielo) (1992)
The Call of the Wild (1903), Jack London	The Call of the Wild (1993)
The Call of the Wild (1903), Jack London	Call of the Wild (1996)
The Call of the Wild (1903), Jack London	The Call of the Wild: Dog of the Yukon (1997)
The Call of the Wild (1903), Jack London	Buck and the Magic Bracelet (Italian: Buck e il braccialetto magico) (1999)
The Call of the Wild (1903), Jack London	Call of the Wild (2009)
The Call of the Wild (1903), Jack London	The Call of the Wild (2020)
Candy: A Novel of Love and Addiction (1998), Luke Davies	Candy (2006)
The Canterbury Tales (c. 1400), Geoffrey Chaucer	The Canterbury Tales (1972)
Canyon Passage (1945), Ernest Haycox	Canyon Passage (1946)
Captain Blood: His Odyssey (1922), Rafael Sabatini	Captain Blood (1924)
Captain Blood: His Odyssey (1922), Rafael Sabatini	Captain Blood (1935)
Captain Blood: His Odyssey (1922), Rafael Sabatini	Fortunes of Captain Blood (1950)
Captain Blood: His Odyssey (1922), Rafael Sabatini	Captain Pirate (1952)
Captain Blood: His Odyssey (1922), Rafael Sabatini	The Son of Captain Blood (1962)
Captain Blood: His Odyssey (1922), Rafael Sabatini	Odyssey of Captain Blood (1991)
The Captain's Table (1954), Richard Gordon	The Captain's Table (1959)
The Captain's Table (1954), Richard Gordon	The Captain (1971)
A Captive in the Land (1962), James Aldridge	A Captive in the Land (1990)
The Card (1911), Arnold Bennett	The Card (1952)
Careful, He Might Hear You (1963), Sumner Locke Elliott	Careful, He Might Hear You (1983)
Carlito's Way (1975), Edwin Torres	Carlito's Way (1993) (Note: Film adapted from the sequel novel After Hours (1979) by the same author.)
Carlito's Way (1975), Edwin Torres	Carlito's Way: Rise to Power (2005) (Note: Prequel to the film.)
The Carpetbaggers (1961), Harold Robbins	The Carpetbaggers (1964)
The Carpetbaggers (1961), Harold Robbins	Nevada Smith (1964)
The Carpetbaggers (1961), Harold Robbins	Nevada Smith (1975) (Note: Failed pilot for a proposed TV series of the same title.)
Carrie (1974), Stephen King	Carrie (1976)
Carrie (1974), Stephen King	The Rage: Carrie 2 (1998) (Note: Sequel to the 1976 film.)
Carrie (1974), Stephen King	Carrie (2002)
Carrie (1974), Stephen King	Carrie (2013)
A Case of Need (1968), Michael Crichton (Note: Written as Jeffery Hudson.)	The Carey Treatment (1972)
Case File: FBI (1953), Gordon Gordon and Mildred Gordon (Note: Written as John Ripley.)	Down Three Dark Streets (1954)
Cash McCall (1955), Cameron Hawley	Cash McCall (1960)
Casino Royale (1953), Ian Fleming	Casino Royale (1967)
Casino Royale (1953), Ian Fleming	Casino Royale (2006)
The Castle (German: Das Schloß) (1926), Franz Kafka	The Castle (1968)
The Castle (German: Das Schloß) (1926), Franz Kafka	Linna (1986)
The Castle (German: Das Schloß) (1926), Franz Kafka	The Castle (Russian: Замок, romanized: Zamok) (1994)
The Castle (German: Das Schloß) (1926), Franz Kafka	The Castle (1997)
Cat Chaser (1982), Elmore Leonard	Cat Chaser (1989)
Catch-22 (1961), Joseph Heller	Catch-22 (1970)
Catlow (1963), Louis L'Amour	Catlow (1971)
The Cautious Amorist (1931), Norman Lindsay	Our Girl Friday (1953) (a. k. a. The Adventures of Sadie)
The Caveman's Valentine (1994), George Dawes Green	The Caveman's Valentine (2001)
Cell (2006), Stephen King	Cell (2016)
The Cement Garden (1978), Ian McEwan	The Cement Garden (1993)
A Certain Mr. Takahashi (1985), Ann Ireland	The Pianist (1991)
La chair du maître (1997), Dany Laferrière	Heading South (French: Vers le sud) (2005)
The Chamber (1994), John Grisham	The Chamber (1996)
Charlie and the Chocolate Factory (1964), Roald Dahl	Willy Wonka & the Chocolate Factory (1971)
Charlie and the Chocolate Factory (1964), Roald Dahl	Charlie and the Chocolate Factory (2005)
Charlie and the Chocolate Factory (1964), Roald Dahl	Tom and Jerry: Willy Wonka and the Chocolate Factory (2017)
Charlie and the Chocolate Factory (1964), Roald Dahl	Wonka (2023)
Charlie Chan Carries On (1930), Earl Derr Biggers	Charlie Chan Carries On (1931)
Charlie Chan Carries On (1930), Earl Derr Biggers	There Were Thirteen (Spanish: Eran trece) (1931)
Charlie Chan Carries On (1930), Earl Derr Biggers	Charlie Chan's Murder Cruise (1940)
Charlie M (1977), Brian Freemantle	Charlie Muffin (1979)
Charlotte Gray (1999), Sebastian Faulks	Charlotte Gray (2001)
Charlotte's Web (1952), E. B. White	Charlotte's Web (1973)
Charlotte's Web (1952), E. B. White	Charlotte's Web 2: Wilbur's Great Adventure (2003) (Note: Sequel to the 1973 film.)
Charlotte's Web (1952), E. B. White	Charlotte's Web (2006)
The Chase (1962), Richard Unekis	Dirty Mary, Crazy Larry (1974)
The Cheetah Girls (1999–2006) (series), Deborah Gregory	The Cheetah Girls (2003)
The Cheetah Girls (1999–2006) (series), Deborah Gregory	The Cheetah Girls 2 (2006)
The Cheetah Girls (1999–2006) (series), Deborah Gregory	The Cheetah Girls: One World (2008)
The Children of Light (1960), H. L. Lawrence	The Damned (1963)
The Children of Men (1992), P. D. James	Children of Men (2006)
Children of Pleasure (1932), Larry Barretto	The Crash (1932)
The Children of Sanchez (1961), Oscar Lewis	The Children of Sanchez (1978)
Children of the Covered Wagon (1934), Mary Jane Carr	Westward Ho the Wagons! (1956)
China Seas (1934), Crosbie Garstin	China Seas (1935)
The Chinese Parrot (1926), Earl Derr Biggers	The Chinese Parrot (1927)
Chocolat (1999), Joanne Harris	Chocolat (2000)
The Chocolate War (1974), Robert Cormier	The Chocolate War (1988)
Christine (1983), Stephen King	Christine (1983)
Christmas at Candleshoe (1953), J. I. M. Stewart (Note: Written as Michael Innes.)	Candleshoe (1977)
Christmas at Twenty-Nine (2002), Kamato Toshio	Singles (2003)
The Christmas Blessing (2003), Donna VanLiere	The Christmas Blessing (2005)
A Christmas Gift (a. k. a. The Melodeon) (1977), Glendon Swarthout	Kelly & Dolly: A Christmas to Remember (1984)
Christmas Holiday (1939), W. Somerset Maugham	Christmas Holiday (1944)
The Christmas Hope (2005), Donna VanLiere	The Christmas Hope (2009)
The Christmas Note (2011), Donna VanLiere	The Christmas Note (2015)
The Christmas Secret (2009), Donna VanLiere	The Christmas Secret (2002)
The Christmas Shoes (2002), Donna VanLiere	The Christmas Shoes (2002)
Christopher Strong (1932), Gilbert Frankau	Christopher Strong (1933)
The Chronicles of Narnia (1950–1956) (series) (Note: Plots and elements adapted from three related works: The Lion, the Witch and the Wardrobe (1950), Prince Caspian (1951) and The Voyage of the Dawn Treader (1952) respectively.), C.S. Lewis	The Lion, the Witch and the Wardrobe (1979)
The Chronicles of Narnia (1950–1956) (series), C.S. Lewis	The Chronicles of Narnia: The Lion, the Witch and the Wardrobe (2005)
The Chronicles of Narnia (1950–1956) (series), C.S. Lewis	The Chronicles of Narnia: Prince Caspian (2008)
The Chronicles of Narnia (1950–1956) (series), C.S. Lewis	The Chronicles of Narnia: The Voyage of the Dawn Treader (2010)
The Chronicles of Narnia (1950–1956) (series), C.S. Lewis	Narnia: The Magician's Nephew (2027)
The Chronicles of Prydain (1964—1968) (series) (Note: Plot adapted from two related works: The Book of Three (1964) and The Black Cauldron (1965) respectively, with the latter taken its title.), Lloyd Alexander	The Black Cauldron (1985)
The Cider House Rules (1985), John Irving	The Cider House Rules (1999)
Cimarron (1929), Edna Ferber	Cimarron (1931)
Cimarron (1929), Edna Ferber	Cimarron (1960)
The Cincinnati Kid (1964), Richard Jessup	The Cincinnati Kid (1965)
Cinderella Liberty (1973), Darryl Ponicsan	Cinderella Liberty (1973)
The Circus of Dr. Lao (1935), Charles G. Finney	7 Faces of Dr. Lao (1964)
The Citadel (1937), A. J. Cronin	The Citadel (1938)
The City of Ember (2003), Jeanne DuPrau	City of Ember (2008)
City of God (Portuguese: Cidade de Deus) (1997), Paulo Lins	City of God (2002)
Clair de femme (1977), Romain Gary	Womanlight (1979)
The Clan of the Cave Bear (1980), Jean Auel	The Clan of the Cave Bear (1986)
The Clansman: A Historical Romance of the Ku Klux Klan (1905), Thomas Dixon, Jr.	The Birth of a Nation (1915)
The Clansman: A Historical Romance of the Ku Klux Klan (1905), Thomas Dixon, Jr.	The Fall of a Nation (1916)
Class Reunion (German: Der Abituriententag) (1928), Franz Werfel	Class Reunion (1974)
Clean Break (1955), Lionel White	The Killing (1956)
Clear and Present Danger (1989), Tom Clancy	Clear and Present Danger (1994)
The Client (1993), John Grisham	The Client (1994)
Clockers (1992), Richard Price	Clockers (1995)
A Clockwork Orange (1962), Anthony Burgess	Vinyl (1965)
A Clockwork Orange (1962), Anthony Burgess	A Clockwork Orange (1971)
The Club Dumas (Spanish: El Club Dumas) (1993), Arturo Pérez-Reverte	The Ninth Gate (1999)
Cockfighter (1962), Charles Willeford	Cockfighter (1974)
Cocoon (1985), David Saperstein	Cocoon (1985)
Cocoon (1985), David Saperstein	Cocoon: The Return (1988)
The Code of the West (1934), Zane Grey	Code of the West (1925)
The Code of the West (1934), Zane Grey	Code of the West (1947)
Coins in the Fountain (1952), John Hermes Secondari	Three Coins in the Fountain (1954)
Coins in the Fountain (1952), John Hermes Secondari	The Pleasure Seekers (1964)
Coins in the Fountain (1952), John Hermes Secondari	Coins in the Fountain (1990)
Cold Mountain (1997), Charles Frazier	Cold Mountain (2003)
Colonel Wolodyjowski (Polish: Pan Wołodyjowski) (1888), Henryk Sienkiewicz	Colonel Wolodyjowski (1968)
The Color of Money (1984), Walter Tevis	The Color of Money (1986)
The Color Purple (1982), Alice Walker	The Color Purple (1985)
The Color Purple (1982), Alice Walker	The Color Purple (2023)
The Colors of the Day (1952), Romain Gary	The Man Who Understood Women (1959)
Colossus (1966), Dennis Feltham Jones	Colossus: The Forbin Project (1970)
The Comedians (1966), Graham Greene	The Comedians (1967)
The Comfort of Strangers (1981), Ian McEwan	The Comfort of Strangers (1990)
Compulsion (1956), Meyer Levin	Compulsion (1959)
Comrade Jacob (1961), David Caute	Winstanley (1975)
Comrades: A Story of Social Adventure in California (1909), Thomas Dixon, Jr.	Bolshevism on Trial (1919)
The Constant Nymph (1923), Margaret Kennedy	The Constant Nymph (1928)
The Constant Nymph (1923), Margaret Kennedy	The Constant Nymph (1933)
The Constant Nymph (1923), Margaret Kennedy	The Constant Nymph (1943)
Conagher (1968), Louis L'Amour	Conagher (1991)
Confessions of a Crap Artist (1975), Philip K. Dick	Barjo (French: Confessions d'un Barjo) (1992)
Congo (1980), Michael Crichton	Congo (1995)
A Connecticut Yankee in King Arthur's Court (1889), Mark Twain	A Connecticut Yankee in King Arthur's Court (1921)
A Connecticut Yankee in King Arthur's Court (1889), Mark Twain	A Connecticut Yankee (1931)
A Connecticut Yankee in King Arthur's Court (1889), Mark Twain	A Connecticut Yankee in King Arthur's Court (1949)
A Connecticut Yankee in King Arthur's Court (1889), Mark Twain	Un español en la corte del rey Arturo (1964)
A Connecticut Yankee in King Arthur's Court (1889), Mark Twain	A Connecticut Yankee in King Arthur's Court (1970)
A Connecticut Yankee in King Arthur's Court (1889), Mark Twain	Unidentified Flying Oddball (1979)
A Connecticut Yankee in King Arthur's Court (1889), Mark Twain	New Adventures of a Yankee in King Arthur's Court (Russian: Новые приключения янки при дворе короля Артура) (1988)
A Connecticut Yankee in King Arthur's Court (1889), Mark Twain	A Connecticut Yankee in King Arthur's Court (1989)
A Connecticut Yankee in King Arthur's Court (1889), Mark Twain	A Kid in King Arthur's Court (1995)
A Connecticut Yankee in King Arthur's Court (1889), Mark Twain	A Young Connecticut Yankee in King Arthur's Court (1995)
A Connecticut Yankee in King Arthur's Court (1889), Mark Twain	A Kid in Aladdin's Palace (1998)
A Connecticut Yankee in King Arthur's Court (1889), Mark Twain	A Knight in Camelot (1998)
A Connecticut Yankee in King Arthur's Court (1889), Mark Twain	Black Knight (2001)
The Constant Gardener (2001), John le Carré	The Constant Gardener (2005)
Contact (1985), Carl Sagan	Contact (1997)
Cool Hand Luke (1965), Donn Pearce	Cool Hand Luke (1967)
Cops and Robbers (1972), Donald E. Westlake	Cops and Robbers (1973)
Coroner Creek (1945), Luke Short	Coroner Creek (1948)
The Count of Monte Cristo (French: Le comte de Monte Cristo) (1844–1846), Alexandre Dumas, père	The Count of Monte Cristo (1913)
The Count of Monte Cristo (French: Le comte de Monte Cristo) (1844–1846), Alexandre Dumas, père	A Modern Monte Cristo (1917)
The Count of Monte Cristo (French: Le comte de Monte Cristo) (1844–1846), Alexandre Dumas, père	Monte Cristo (1922)
The Count of Monte Cristo (French: Le comte de Monte Cristo) (1844–1846), Alexandre Dumas, père	Monte Cristo (1929)
The Count of Monte Cristo (French: Le comte de Monte Cristo) (1844–1846), Alexandre Dumas, père	Count Monte Christopher (Korean: 암굴왕; MR: Amgurwang) (1932)
The Count of Monte Cristo (French: Le comte de Monte Cristo) (1844–1846), Alexandre Dumas, père	The Count of Monte Cristo (1934)
The Count of Monte Cristo (French: Le comte de Monte Cristo) (1844–1846), Alexandre Dumas, père	The Son of Monte Cristo (1940)
The Count of Monte Cristo (French: Le comte de Monte Cristo) (1844–1846), Alexandre Dumas, père	The Count of Monte Cristo (Spanish: El Conde de Montecristo) (1942)
The Count of Monte Cristo (French: Le comte de Monte Cristo) (1844–1846), Alexandre Dumas, père	The Count of Monte Cristo (1943)
The Count of Monte Cristo (French: Le comte de Monte Cristo) (1844–1846), Alexandre Dumas, père	The Wife of Monte Cristo (1946)
The Count of Monte Cristo (French: Le comte de Monte Cristo) (1844–1846), Alexandre Dumas, père	The Return of Monte Cristo (1946)
The Count of Monte Cristo (French: Le comte de Monte Cristo) (1844–1846), Alexandre Dumas, père	The Secret of Monte Cristo (French: Le Secret de Monte-Cristo) (1948)
The Count of Monte Cristo (French: Le comte de Monte Cristo) (1844–1846), Alexandre Dumas, père	Treasure of Monte Cristo (1949)
The Count of Monte Cristo (French: Le comte de Monte Cristo) (1844–1846), Alexandre Dumas, père	Prince of Revenge (Arabic: أمير الانتقام, romanized: Amir el-Inteqam) (1950)
The Count of Monte Cristo (French: Le comte de Monte Cristo) (1844–1846), Alexandre Dumas, père	The Sword of Monte Cristo (1951)
The Count of Monte Cristo (French: Le comte de Monte Cristo) (1844–1846), Alexandre Dumas, père	Sword of Venus (1953)
The Count of Monte Cristo (French: Le comte de Monte Cristo) (1844–1846), Alexandre Dumas, père	The Count of Monte Cristo (1953)
The Count of Monte Cristo (French: Le comte de Monte Cristo) (1844–1846), Alexandre Dumas, père	The Count of Monte Cristo (1954)
The Count of Monte Cristo (French: Le comte de Monte Cristo) (1844–1846), Alexandre Dumas, père	The Viscount of Monte Cristo (Spanish: El Vizconde de Montecristo) (1954)
The Count of Monte Cristo (French: Le comte de Monte Cristo) (1844–1846), Alexandre Dumas, père	Vanji Kottai Valipan (Tamil: வஞ்சிக்கோட்டை வாலிபன்) (1958)
The Count of Monte Cristo (French: Le comte de Monte Cristo) (1844–1846), Alexandre Dumas, père	Raj Tilak (Hindi: राज तिलक) (1958)
The Count of Monte Cristo (French: Le comte de Monte Cristo) (1844–1846), Alexandre Dumas, père	The Count of Monte Cristo (1961)
The Count of Monte Cristo (French: Le comte de Monte Cristo) (1844–1846), Alexandre Dumas, père	The Treasure of Monte Cristo (1961)
The Count of Monte Cristo (French: Le comte de Monte Cristo) (1844–1846), Alexandre Dumas, père	The Return of Monte Cristo (French: Sous le signe de Monte-Cristo) (1968)
The Count of Monte Cristo (French: Le comte de Monte Cristo) (1844–1846), Alexandre Dumas, père	The Count of Monte Cristo (1973)
The Count of Monte Cristo (French: Le comte de Monte Cristo) (1844–1846), Alexandre Dumas, père	The Count of Monte Cristo (1975)
The Count of Monte Cristo (French: Le comte de Monte Cristo) (1844–1846), Alexandre Dumas, père	Padayottam (Malayalam: പടയോട്ടം) (1982)
The Count of Monte Cristo (French: Le comte de Monte Cristo) (1844–1846), Alexandre Dumas, père	Veta (Telugu: వేట) (1986)
The Count of Monte Cristo (French: Le comte de Monte Cristo) (1844–1846), Alexandre Dumas, père	The Prisoner of Château d'If (Russian: Узник замка Иф) (1988)
The Count of Monte Cristo (French: Le comte de Monte Cristo) (1844–1846), Alexandre Dumas, père	The Count of Monte-Cristo (1992)
The Count of Monte Cristo (French: Le comte de Monte Cristo) (1844–1846), Alexandre Dumas, père	The Count of Monte Cristo (1997)
The Count of Monte Cristo (French: Le comte de Monte Cristo) (1844–1846), Alexandre Dumas, père	The Count of Monte Cristo (2002)
The Count of Monte Cristo (French: Le comte de Monte Cristo) (1844–1846), Alexandre Dumas, père	The Count of Monte Cristo (2024)
The Cowboys (1971), William Dale Jennings	The Cowboys (1972)
Cracking India (1991), Bapsi Sidhwa	Earth (1998)
Crash (1973), J. G. Ballard	Crash (1996)
Creator (1980), Jeremy Leven	Creator (1985)
The Crime of Father Amaro (Portuguese: O Crime do Padre Amaro) (1875), José Maria de Eça de Queiroz	The Crime of Padre Amaro (Spanish: El crimen del padre Amaro) (2002)
The Crime of Father Amaro (Portuguese: O Crime do Padre Amaro) (1875), José Maria de Eça de Queiroz	O Crime do Padre Amaro (2005)
Crossfire Trail (1954), Louis L'Amour	Crossfire Trail (2001)
Crouching Tiger, Hidden Dragon (Chinese: 卧虎藏龙, Wòhǔ Cánglóng) (1942), Wang Dulu	Crouching Tiger, Hidden Dragon (2000)
Crouching Tiger, Hidden Dragon (Chinese: 卧虎藏龙, Wòhǔ Cánglóng) (1942), Wang Dulu	Crouching Tiger, Hidden Dragon: Sword of Destiny (Chinese: 卧虎藏龙：青冥宝剑) (2016)
The Cruel Sea (1951), Nicholas Monsarrat	The Cruel Sea (1953)
Cry Wolf (a. k. a. The Demarest Inheritance) (1945), Marjorie Carleton	Cry Wolf (1947)
Cutter and Bone (1976), Newton Thornburg	Cutter's Way (1981)
Cyborg (1972), Martin Caidin	The Six Million Dollar Man (1973)
Cycle of the Werewolf (1983), Stephen King	Silver Bullet (1985)
The Cypher (a. k. a. The Cipher) (1961), Gordon Cotler	Arabesque (1966)

== See also ==
- Lists of works of fiction made into feature films
  - List of fiction works made into feature films (D–J)
  - List of fiction works made into feature films (K–R)
  - List of fiction works made into feature films (S–Z)
- Lists of literature made into feature films
  - List of short fiction made into feature films
  - List of children's books made into feature films
  - List of non-fiction works made into feature films
  - List of comics and comic strips made into feature films
  - List of plays adapted into feature films (disambiguation)
