= List of United States Christmas television specials =

The following is a list of Christmas television specials partly or completely originating in the U.S.

== Christmas-related films and specials ==
Dates and networks shown correspond to the special's first telecast.

- 5 More Sleeps ’til Christmas (November 27, 2021, NBC)
- The 12 Days of Christmas Eve (November 26, 2022/Lifetime)
- 12 Dates of Christmas (December 11, 2011, ABC Family)
- 12 Men of Christmas (December 5, 2009, Lifetime)
- 12 Tiny Christmas Tales (December 7, 2001, Cartoon Network)
- The Adventures of Candy Claus (1987)
- Albert (December 9, 2016/Nickelodeon)
- Alien Xmas (November 20, 2020, Netflix)
- Aliens First Christmas (November 28, 1991, Disney Channel)
- Amahl and the Night Visitors (December 24, 1951, NBC) (most of the 1951 cast members stayed with this production until 1963)
- Amahl and the Night Visitors (December 25, 1963, NBC) (all-new production)
- Amahl and the Night Visitors (December 24, 1978, NBC) (all-new production)
- An American Christmas Carol (December 16, 1979, ABC)
- An Angel for Christmas (1996)
- An American Girl Story – Maryellen 1955: Extraordinary Christmas (2016, Prime Video)
- The Angel of Pennsylvania Avenue (December 15, 1996, The Family Channel)
- Angels in the Snow (November 15, 2015, Up TV)
- Annie Claus Is Coming to Town (December 10, 2011, Hallmark Channel)
- The Anta Claus of the South Pole (2026)
- Babes in Toyland (December 25, 1950, NBC) (presented on Musical Comedy Time)
- Babes in Toyland (December 18, 1954)
- Babes in Toyland (December 25, 1960, NBC) (presented on Shirley Temple's Storybook)
- Babes in Toyland (December 19, 1986, NBC)
- Baby's First Christmas (December 15, 2012, Hallmark Channel)
- The Balloonatiks: Christmas Without a Claus (December 14, 1996, Fox)
- Barbie in the Nutcracker (November 1, 2026, Netflix)
- B.C.: A Special Christmas (1981, HBO)
- The Bear Who Slept Through Christmas (December 17, 1973, NBC)
- The Bears Who Saved Christmas (December 8, 1994, syndication)
- Beebo Saves Christmas (December 1, 2021, The CW)
- The Bell Telephone Hour Christmas specials (1959–1968, NBC)
- Benji's Very Own Christmas Story (December 7, 1978, ABC)
- The Berenstain Bears' Christmas Tree (December 3, 1979, NBC)
- The Best Christmas Pageant Ever (December 5, 1983, ABC)
- Blending Christmas (December 12, 2021) (Lifetime)
- Borrowed Hearts (November 30, 1997, CBS)
- A Boyfriend for Christmas (November 27, 2004, Hallmark Channel)
- Brer Rabbit's Christmas Carol (1992)
- The Cabbage Patch Kids' First Christmas (December 7, 1984, ABC)
- Caillou's Perfect Christmas (December 9, 2022, Peacock)
- Call Me Claus (December 2, 2001/TNT)
- Candles in the Dark (December 3, 1993, The Family Channel)
- A Carol Christmas (December 7, 2003, Hallmark Channel)
- Carol for Another Christmas (December 28, 1964, ABC)
- Catch a Christmas Star (November 17, 2013, Hallmark Channel)
- A Chance of Snow (December 7, 1998, Lifetime)
- Charlie's Christmas Secret (December 20, 1984, syndication)
- Chasing Christmas (December 4, 2005, ABC Family)
- A Cherry Pie Christmas (2025)
- A Chipmunk Christmas (December 14, 1981, NBC)
- A Christmas Adventure (1991, syndication)
- Christmas...Again?! (December 3, 2021, Disney Channel)
- Christmas at Walt Disney World (December 10, 1978, NBC)
- The Christmas Blessing (December 18, 2005, Lifetime)
- The Christmas Box (December 17, 1995, CBS)
- A Christmas Calendar (December 18, 1987, PBS)
- Christmas Caper (November 25, 2007, ABC Family)
- The Christmas Card (December 2, 2006, Hallmark Channel)
- The Christmas Carol (December 25, 1949)
- A Christmas Carol (December 23, 1954, CBS) (presented on Shower of Stars)
- A Christmas Carol (December 21, 1971, ABC)
- A Christmas Carol (December 17, 1984, CBS)
- A Christmas Carol (December 5, 1999, TNT)
- A Christmas Carol (November 28, 2004, NBC)
- The Christmas Choir (December 9, 2008, Hallmark Channel)
- Christmas Comes to Willow Creek (December 20, 1987, CBS)
- The Christmas Consultant (November 10, 2012, Lifetime)
- Christmas Cupid (December 12, 2010, ABC Family)
- The Christmas Dinosaur (2004)
- Christmas Do-Over (December 16, 2006, ABC Family)
- Christmas Eve (December 22, 1986, NBC)
- Christmas Every Day (1986, CBS)
- Christmas Every Day (December 1, 1996, The Family Channel)
- A Christmas for Boomer (December 6, 1979, NBC)
- Christmas Bounty (November 26, 2013/ABC Family)
- The Christmas Gift (December 21, 1986, CBS)
- The Christmas Heart (December 2, 2012, Hallmark Channel)
- The Christmas Hope (December 13, 2009, Lifetime)
- The Christmas House (November 22, 2020, Hallmark Channel)
- Christmas in Canaan (December 12, 2009, Hallmark Channel)
- Christmas in Cartoontown (1996)
- Christmas in Connecticut (April 13, 1992, TNT)
- Christmas in Conway (December 1, 2013, ABC)
- Christmas in Disneyland (December 8, 1976, ABC)
- Christmas in Paradise (December 15, 2007, Lifetime)
- Christmas in Rockefeller Center (1998, NBC)
- Christmas in Tattertown (December 21, 1988, Nickelodeon)
- Christmas Is (1970, syndication)
- Christmas Is Here Again (2007)
- Christmas Lilies of the Field (December 16, 1979, NBC)
- The Christmas List (December 1, 1997, The Family Channel)
- A Christmas Melody (December 19, 2015, Hallmark Channel)
- Christmas Miracle in Caufield, U.S.A. (December 26, 1977, NBC)
- The Christmas Note (November 29, 2015, Hallmark Channel)
- Christmas on the Square (November 22, 2020/Netflix)
- The Christmas Ornament (November 16, 2013, Hallmark Channel)
- The Christmas Parade (December 14, 2014, Hallmark Channel)
- The Christmas Path (December 12, 1999, Fox Family)
- A Christmas Romance (December 18, 1994, CBS)
- The Christmas Secret (December 17, 2000, CBS)
- The Christmas Secret (December 7, 2014, Hallmark Channel)
- The Christmas Setup (December 12, 2020, Lifetime)
- The Christmas Shepherd (November 23, 2014, Hallmark Channel)
- The Christmas Shoes (December 1, 2002, Lifetime)
- The Christmas Spirit (December 1, 2013, Hallmark Channel)
- The Christmas Star (December 14, 1986, ABC)
- A Christmas Story Live! (December 17, 2017, Fox)
- A Christmas to Remember (December 20, 1978, CBS)
- The Christmas Train (November 25, 2017, Hallmark Channel)
- The Christmas Tree (December 14, 1991, USA Network)
- The Christmas Tree (December 22, 1996, ABC)
- The Christmas Visitor (December 5, 1987, Disney Channel)
- A Christmas Visitor (December 21, 2002, Hallmark Channel)
- A Christmas Wedding (December 11, 2006, Lifetime)
- The Christmas Wish (December 6, 1998, CBS)
- Christmas with Grubbs (November 1, 2024, YouTube)
- Christmas with Tucker (November 25, 2013, Hallmark Channel)
- A Christmas Without Snow (December 9, 1980, CBS)
- Christopher the Christmas Tree (December 24, 1993, Fox)
- A Chuck E. Cheese Christmas (November 27, 2025/Prime Video)
- The City That Forgot About Christmas (November 29, 1974, syndication)
- A Claymation Christmas Celebration (December 21, 1987, CBS)
- A Clüsterfünke Christmas (December 4, 2021/Comedy Central)
- CMA Country Christmas (2009–present, ABC)
- A Cool Like That Christmas (December 23, 1993, Fox)
- Cranberry Christmas (December 8, 2008, ABC Family)
- Crawford the Cat's Christmas (November 14, 2018, Amazon Prime)
- Crown for Christmas (November 27, 2015, Hallmark Channel)
- Deck the Halls (1994, syndication)
- Deck the Halls with Wacky Walls (December 11, 1983, NBC)
- Defending Santa (November 24, 2013, Ion Television)
- Desperately Seeking Santa (November 27, 2011, ABC Family)
- A Different Kind of Christmas (December 9, 1996, Lifetime)
- Disney Channel Holiday House Party (December 13, 2020)
- A Diva's Christmas Carol (December 13, 2000, VH1)
- A Dog Named Christmas (November 29, 2009, CBS)
- The Dog Who Saved Christmas (November 29, 2009, ABC Family)
- The Dog Who Saved Christmas Vacation (November 28, 2010, ABC Family)
- Dolly Parton's Christmas of Many Colors: Circle of Love (November 30, 2016, NBC)
- Dolly Parton's Mountain Magic Christmas (December 1, 2022, NBC)
- Donner (December 1, 2001, ABC Family)
- Dot & Spot's Magical Christmas Adventure (1996)
- Ebbie (December 4, 1995, Lifetime)
- Edith Ann's Christmas (Just Say Noël) (December 14, 1996, ABC)
- Electric Christmas (1994, Focus on the Family)
- Elf: Buddy's Musical Christmas (December 16, 2014, NBC)
- The Elf and the Magic Key (December 1993, USA Network)
- The Elf Who Saved Christmas (December 10, 1992, USA Network)
- An Elf's Story: The Elf on the Shelf (November 26, 2011, CBS)
- Eloise at Christmastime (November 22, 2003, ABC)
- The Enchanted Nutcracker (December 22, 1961, ABC)
- A Family Circus Christmas (December 18, 1979, NBC)
- The Fat Albert Christmas Special (December 18, 1977/CBS)
- The Flight Before Christmas (December 5, 2015, Lifetime)
- A Freezerburnt Christmas (1997)
- A Fruitcake Christmas (2005, Tommy Nelson, Glue Works Entertainment)
- A Garfield Christmas (December 21, 1987, CBS)
- Ghosting: The Spirit of Christmas (December 4, 2019, Freeform)
- The Ghosts of Christmas Eve (December 14, 1999, Fox Family)
- The Gift of Love: A Christmas Story (December 20, 1983, CBS)
- The Glo Friends Save Christmas (1985, syndication)
- A Golden Christmas (December 13, 2009, Ion Television)
- Good Luck Charlie, It's Christmas! (December 2, 2011, Disney Channel)
- Grandma Got Run Over by a Reindeer (October 31, 2000, The WB)
- A Grandpa for Christmas (November 24, 2007, Hallmark Channel)
- The Great Christmas Light Fight (a recurring reality series) (2013–present, ABC)
- Green Christmas (Big City Greens), (December 7, 2019, Disney Channel)
- Grumpy Cat's Worst Christmas Ever (November 29, 2014, Lifetime)
- The Guardians of the Galaxy Holiday Special (2022, Disney+)
- The Happy Elf (December 2, 2005, NBC)
- His and Her Christmas (December 19, 2005, Lifetime)
- A Hobo's Christmas (December 6, 1987, CBS)
- Holiday Affair (December 15, 1996, USA Network)
- Holiday Heart (December 10, 2000, Showtime)
- Holiday in Your Heart (December 14, 1997, ABC)
- The Holiday Sitter (December 11, 2022, Hallmark Channel)
- A Holiday to Remember (December 12, 1995, CBS)
- Holidays Unwrapped: A Disney Channel Music Event (December 8, 2019)
- A Hollywood Hounds Christmas (December 16, 1994, syndication)
- Home Alone: The Holiday Heist (November 25, 2012, ABC Family)
- Home Alone 4 (November 3, 2002, ABC)
- Home for the Holidays (November 28, 1972, ABC)
- The Homecoming: A Christmas Story (December 19, 1971, CBS)
- Hoops & Yoyo Ruin Christmas (November 25, 2011, CBS)
- Hot Mess Holiday (2021, Comedy Central)
- The House Without a Christmas Tree (December 3, 1972, CBS)
- How the Grinch Stole Christmas! (December 18, 1966, CBS)
- How to Marry a Billionaire: A Christmas Tale (December 20, 2000, Fox)
- How Murray Saved Christmas (December 5, 2014, NBC)
- I Saw Mommy Kissing Santa Claus (December 9, 2001, PAX Network)
- I'll Be Home for Christmas (December 12, 1988, NBC)
- I'll Be Home for Christmas (December 23, 1997, CBS)
- Ice Age: A Mammoth Christmas (November 24, 2011, Fox)
- If You Believe (December 5, 1999, Lifetime)
- In the Nick of Time (December 16, 1991, NBC)
- It Happened One Christmas (December 11, 1977, ABC)
- It's Christmas, Carol! (November 18, 2012, Hallmark Channel)
- It's Christmas, Dr. Joe! (December 18, 2004, syndication)
- Jingle Ballin' (December 6, 2016, YouTube)
- Jingle Bell Rap (1991, syndication)
- Jingle Bell Rock (December 22, 1995, ABC)
- John Grin's Christmas (December 6, 1986, ABC)
- Jolly Old St. Nicholas (1994, syndication)
- Karroll's Christmas (December 14, 2004, A&E)
- The Kid Who Loved Christmas (1990, syndication)
- Ladies of the '80s: A Divas Christmas (December 2, 2023, Lifetime)
- The Life & Adventures of Santa Claus (2000)
- Life-Size 2 (December 2, 2018/Freeform)
- Like Father, Like Santa (December 1, 1998, Fox Family)
- The Little Rascals Christmas Special (December 3, 1979, NBC)
- Little Spirit: Christmas in New York (December 10, 2008, NBC)
- The Littlest Angel (December 6, 1969, NBC)
- Love's Christmas Journey (November 5, 2011, Hallmark Channel)
- The Magic Hockey Skates (December 13, 2012/Amazon Prime)
- The Man in the Santa Claus Suit (December 21, 1979, NBC)
- The Man Who Saved Christmas (December 15, 2002, CBS)
- Maxine's Christmas Carol (2000, PBS)
- Meet the Santas (December 17, 2005, Hallmark Channel)
- A Merry Mirthworm Christmas (December 14, 1984, Showtime)
- Miracle on 34th Street (November 27, 1959, NBC) (presented on NBC Friday Night Special Presentation)
- The Miracle on 34th Street (December 14, 1955, CBS) (presented on The 20th Century Fox Hour)
- Miracle on 34th Street (December 14, 1973, CBS)
- Mister Magoo's Christmas Carol (December 18, 1962, NBC)
- The Mistle-Tones (December 9, 2012, ABC Family)
- A Mom for Christmas (December 17, 1990, NBC)
- The Moo Family Holiday Hoe-Down (November 29, 1992, syndication)
- The Most Wonderful Time of the Year (December 13, 2008, Hallmark Channel)
- A Mouse, a Mystery and Me (December 13, 1987, NBC)
- Mr. Bill's Christmas Special (1996)
- Mr. Krueger's Christmas (December 21, 1980, NBC)
- Mr. St. Nick (November 17, 2002, ABC)
- Mrs. Miracle (December 5, 2009, Hallmark Channel)
- Mrs. Santa Claus (December 8, 1996, CBS)
- Ms. Scrooge (December 10, 1997, USA Network)
- My Christmas Special (December 8, 2009, PBS)
- National Lampoon's Christmas Vacation 2 (December 20, 2003, NBC)
- The National Tree (November 28, 2009, Hallmark Channel)
- The Nativity (December 22, 1952, CBS)
- The Nativity (December 17, 1978, ABC)
- Nickelodeon's Ho-Ho Holiday Special (December 5, 2015)
- Nick & Noel (November 25, 1993, syndication)
- The Night B4 Christmas (2003)
- The Night Before Christmas: A Mouse Tale (2002)
- The Night Before Christmas (1968, syndication)
- The Night the Animals Talked (December 9, 1970, ABC)
- The Night They Saved Christmas (December 13, 1984, ABC)
- The Nine Lives of Christmas (November 8, 2014, Hallmark Channel)
- Noël (December 4, 1992, NBC)
- The Nutcracker (Balanchine) (December 25, 1958, CBS) (presented on Playhouse 90)
- The Nutcracker (December 21, 1965, CBS) (A German-American co-production, with a changed plotline)
- The Nutcracker (Baryshnikov) (December 16, 1977, CBS)
- The Nutcracker (Balanchine) (December 14, 2011, PBS) (presented on Live from Lincoln Center)
- The Nutcracker on Ice (several versions)
- The Nuttiest Nutcracker (December 4, 1999, CBS)
- O Christmas Tree (1994)
- Off Season (December 16, 2001, Showtime)
- Olive, the Other Reindeer (December 17, 1999, Fox)
- One Christmas (December 19, 1994, NBC)
- The Online Adventures of Ozzie the Elf (December 13, 1997, ABC)
- Pillow People Save Christmas (1988)
- The Pink Panther in: A Pink Christmas (December 7, 1978, ABC)
- P.J.'s Unfunnybunny Christmas (December 11, 1993, ABC) (presented on ABC Weekend Special)
- The Poky Little Puppy's First Christmas (December 13, 1992, Showtime)
- A Princess for Christmas (December 3, 2011, Hallmark Channel)
- Raggedy Ann and Andy in The Great Santa Claus Caper (November 30, 1978, CBS)
- Red Boots for Christmas (1995)
- Reindeer in Here (November 29, 2022, CBS)
- Reno 911!: It's a Wonderful Heist (December 3, 2022/Comedy Central)
- Roots: The Gift (December 11, 1988, ABC)
- Roxanne's Best Christmas Ever (1998)
- A Royal Christmas (November 21, 2014, Hallmark Channel)
- Rudolph the Red-Nosed Reindeer and the Island of Misfit Toys (2001)
- Rudolph the Red-Nosed Reindeer: The Movie (1998)
- Santa and the Three Bears (1970, syndication)
- Santa Baby (December 10, 2006, ABC Family)
- Santa Baby 2: Christmas Maybe (December 13, 2009, ABC Family)
- The Santa Claus Brothers (December 14, 2001, Disney Channel)
- Santa Hunters (November 28, 2014, Nickelodeon)
- Santa Jr. (December 6, 2002, ABC Family)
- Santa Mouse and the Ratdeer (2000, Fox Family)
- Santa vs. the Snowman (December 12, 1997, ABC)
- Santa Who? (November 19, 2000, ABC)
- Santa's Little Helper (2015)
- Santa's Magic Book (December 15, 1996)
- Santa's Magic Toy Bag (December 12, 1983, Showtime)
- Santabear's First Christmas (November 22, 1986, ABC)
- Santabear's High Flying Adventure (December 24, 1987, CBS)
- Secret of Giving (November 25, 1999, CBS)
- Secret Santa (December 14, 2003, NBC)
- Scrooge's Rock 'N' Roll Christmas (November 24, 1984)
- Silent Night, Lonely Night (December 16, 1969, NBC)
- Simple Gifts (December 17, 1978, PBS)
- Single Santa Seeks Mrs. Claus (December 11, 2004, Hallmark Channel)
- Skinflint: A Country Christmas Carol (December 18, 1979, NBC)
- A Smoky Mountain Christmas (December 14, 1986, ABC)
- Snow (December 13, 2004, ABC)
- Snow 2: Brain Freeze (December 14, 2008, ABC Family)
- Snowden on Ice (November 28, 1997, CBS)
- The Snowden, Raggedy Ann & Andy Holiday Show (November 27, 1998, CBS)
- Snowden's Christmas (December 3, 1999, CBS)
- A Snow White Christmas (December 19, 1980, CBS)
- A Snow White Christmas (December 8, 2018, Ion Television)
- Special Delivery (December 10, 2000, Fox Family)
- The Spirit of Christmas (1953)
- The Stableboy's Christmas (1979, syndication)
- A Star for Jeremy (1982)
- The Stingiest Man in Town (December 23, 1956, NBC)
- The Story Lady (December 9, 1991, NBC)
- The Story of Santa Claus (December 7, 1996, CBS)
- T.I. & Tiny: Holiday Hustle Special (December 16, 2013/VH1)
- Timothy Tweedle: The First Christmas Elf (December 25, 2000, Toon Disney)
- Tiny Christmas (December 2, 2017, Nickelodeon)
- The Tiny Tree (December 14, 1975, NBC)
- Trading Christmas (November 26, 2011, Hallmark Channel)
- A Trash Truck Christmas (December 11, 2020, Netflix)
- The Tree That Saved Christmas (November 30, 2014, Up TV)
- The True Meaning of Crumbfest (1998, Teletoon)
- 'Twas the Night (December 7, 2001, Disney Channel)
- 'Twas the Night Before Christmas (1992)
- The Twelve Days of Christmas (December 3, 1993, NBC)
- The Twelve Days of Christmas (1995)
- The Ugly Duckling's Christmas Wish (1996, syndication)
- The Ultimate Christmas Present (December 1, 2000, Disney Channel)
- Under the Christmas Tree (December 19, 2021, Lifetime)
- Up on the Housetop (1992, syndication)
- A Very Barry Christmas (2005)
- A Very Boy Band Holiday (2021, ABC)
- A Very Merry Cricket (December 14, 1973, ABC)
- A Very Merry Mix-Up (November 10, 2013, Hallmark Channel)
- A Very Murray Christmas (December 4, 2015, Netflix)
- A Very Pink Christmas (December 7, 2011, ABC Family)
- A Very Retail Christmas (December 24, 1990, NBC)
- A Very School Gyrls Holla-Day (December 3, 2010, Nickelodeon)
- A Very Solar Holiday Opposites Special (2021, Hulu)
- Virtually Christmas (Big City Greens) (December 3, 2022, Disney Channel)
- The Waltons: Homecoming (November 28, 2021, The CW)
- We Wish You a Merry Christmas (1994, syndication)
- When Angels Come to Town (November 28, 2004, CBS)
- Who Killed Santa? A Murderville Murder Mystery (December 15, 2022/Netflix)
- Why the Bears Dance on Christmas Eve (December 12, 1977, ABC)
- A Wish for Wings That Work (December 18, 1991, CBS)
- The Wish That Changed Christmas (December 20, 1991, CBS)
- Wishin' and Hopin' (December 6, 2014, Lifetime)
- The Year Without a Santa Claus (December 11, 2006, NBC)
- A WowieBOZowee Christmas (October 1, 2007, Reel FX Animation, Exclaim Entertainment)
- Yes, Virginia (December 11, 2009, CBS)
- Yes, Virginia, There is a Santa Claus (December 10, 1974, ABC)
- Yes, Virginia, There Is a Santa Claus (December 1, 1991, ABC)
- Young Pioneers' Christmas (December 1976, ABC)
- Ziggy's Gift (December 1, 1982, ABC)
- The Zoomer Crew's First Christmas (December 23, 2000)

== Franchises and groupings ==
=== Mickey Mouse ===
- Mickey's Orphans (December 5, 1931)
- Mickey's Good Deed (December 17, 1932)
- Pluto's Christmas Tree (1952)
- Mickey's Christmas Carol (December 16, 1983/NBC)
- Mickey Mouse Works: "The Nutcracker" (1999/ABC)
  - "Mickey's Christmas Chaos" (2000/ABC)
- Mickey's Once Upon a Christmas (1999)
- House of Mouse:
- Mickey's Magical Christmas: Snowed in at the House of Mouse (2001)
  - "Clarabelle's Christmas List" (December 2, 2002/Toon Disney)
  - "Pete's Christmas Caper" (December 2, 2002/Toon Disney)
- Mickey's Twice Upon a Christmas (2004)
- Duck the Halls: A Mickey Mouse Christmas Special (December 9, 2016/Disney Channel)
- Mickey and Minnie Wish Upon a Christmas (December 2, 2021/Disney Junior)
- Mickey Saves Christmas (2022/Disney Junior)
- Mickey's Christmas Tales: Starstruck (2023/Disney Junior)
- Mickey and the Very Many Christmases (December 1, 2024/Disney Junior)
- Mickey's Home Alone (2026/Disney+ and Disney Junior)

=== Walt Disney ===
- Santa's Workshop (December 10, 1932/Silly Symphony)
- The Night Before Christmas (December 9, 1933/Silly Symphony)
- Toy Tinkers (December 16, 1949/Donald Duck)
- From All of Us to All of You (December 19, 1958/ABC)
- A Magical Disney Christmas (December 5, 1981/CBS)
- A Disney Christmas Gift (December 4, 1982/CBS)
- A Disney Channel Christmas (December 3, 1983/CBS)
- A Goof Troop Christmas (1992/ABC)
- Prep & Landing (December 8, 2009/ABC)
- Prep & Landing: Operation: Secret Santa (December 7, 2010/ABC)
- Prep & Landing: Naughty vs. Nice (December 5, 2011/ABC)
- Prep & Landing: The Snowball Protocol (November 27, 2025)
- Dasher (November 28, 2026)

=== Looney Tunes ===
- The Shanty Where Santy Claus Lives (December 24, 1933)
- Bedtime for Sniffles (1940)
- Gift Wrapped (1952)
- Bugs Bunny's Looney Christmas Tales (1979/CBS)
- Bah, Humduck! A Looney Tunes Christmas (2006)
- Looney Tunes Cartoons: "Bugs Bunny's 24-Carrot Holiday Special" (December 3, 2020/HBO Max)

=== Popeye the Sailor ===
- Seasin's Greetinks! (December 17, 1933)
- Mister and Mistletoe (1955)
- Spinach Greetings (1960)
- Popeye's Voyage: The Quest for Pappy (2004)

=== Tom and Jerry ===
- The Night Before Christmas (December 6, 1941)
- The Tom and Jerry Comedy Show: "Snowbrawl" (1980/CBS)
- Tom and Jerry Tales: "Ho Ho Horrors" (Kids' WB)
- Tom and Jerry Tales: "Doggone Hill Hog" (Kids' WB)
- Tom and Jerry: A Nutcracker Tale (2007)
- The Tom and Jerry Show: "The Plight Before Christmas"
- Tom and Jerry: Santa's Little Helpers (2014)
- The Tom and Jerry Show: "Dragon Down the Holidays"
- Tom and Jerry: Snowman's Land (2022)

=== Rankin/Bass ===
- Rudolph the Red-Nosed Reindeer (December 6, 1964/NBC)
- Cricket on the Hearth (December 18, 1967/NBC)
- The Little Drummer Boy (December 19, 1968/NBC)
- Frosty the Snowman (December 7, 1969/CBS)
- Santa Claus Is Comin' to Town (December 13, 1970/ABC)
- Festival of Family Classics: "A Christmas Tree" (1972/syndication)
- Twas the Night Before Christmas (December 8, 1974/CBS)
- The Year Without a Santa Claus (December 10, 1974/ABC)
- The First Christmas: The Story of the First Christmas Snow (December 19, 1975/NBC)
- Frosty's Winter Wonderland (December 2, 1976/ABC)
- Rudolph's Shiny New Year (December 10, 1976/ABC)
- The Little Drummer Boy, Book II (1976/NBC)
- Nestor, the Long-Eared Christmas Donkey (December 3, 1977/ABC)
- The Stingiest Man in Town (December 23, 1978/ABC)
- Jack Frost (December 13, 1979/NBC)
- Rudolph and Frosty's Christmas in July (1979/ABC)
- Pinocchio's Christmas (December 3, 1980/ABC)
- The Leprechauns' Christmas Gold (December 23, 1981/ABC)
- The Life and Adventures of Santa Claus (December 17, 1985/CBS)
- Frosty Returns (December 1, 1992/CBS)
- Santa, Baby! (December 17, 2001/FOX)
- The Legend of Frosty the Snowman (2005)
- A Miser Brothers' Christmas (December 13, 2008/ABC Family)

==== The Flintstones ====
- The Flintstones: "Christmas Flintstone" (December 25, 1964/ABC)
- A Flintstone Christmas (December 7, 1977/NBC)
- A Flintstone Family Christmas (December 18, 1993/ABC)
- A Flintstones Christmas Carol (1994/ABC)
- Cave Kids: "A Cavekid Christmas" (1997/Syndication)

=== Charlie Brown / Peanuts ===
- A Charlie Brown Christmas (December 9, 1965/CBS)
- It's Christmastime Again, Charlie Brown (November 27, 1992/CBS)
- Charlie Brown's Christmas Tales (December 8, 2002/ABC)
- I Want a Dog for Christmas, Charlie Brown (December 9, 2003/ABC)
- Snoopy Presents: For Auld Lang Syne (December 10, 2021/Apple TV+)
- The Snoopy Show:
  - "Twas The Nest Before Christmas/Happiness is the Gift of Giving/Do Not Open Until" (Season 2, Episode 13) (December 1, 2022)
  - "Happiness is Holiday Traditions/Window Wonderland/Spike’s Old-Fashioned Christmas" (Season 3, Episode 13) (December 1, 2023)
- Snoopy Presents: 12 Days of Snoopy (November 13, 2026/Apple TV+)

=== Davey and Goliath ===
- Davey and Goliath: Christmas Lost and Found (1965/Syndication)
- Davey and Goliath's Snowboard Christmas (2004/Hallmark Channel)

=== Jim Henson / The Muppets / Sesame Street ===
- The Great Santa Claus Switch (December 20, 1970/CBS)
- Emmet Otter's Jug-Band Christmas (December 4, 1977/HBO)
- Christmas Eve on Sesame Street (December 3, 1978/PBS)
- A Special Sesame Street Christmas (December 8, 1978/CBS)
- John Denver and the Muppets: A Christmas Together (December 5, 1979/ABC)
- The Christmas Toy (December 6, 1986/ABC)
- A Muppet Family Christmas (December 16, 1987/ABC)
- Mr. Willowby's Christmas Tree (December 6, 1995/CBS)
- Elmo Saves Christmas (December 2, 1996/PBS)
- It's a Very Merry Muppet Christmas Movie (2002/NBC)
- A Sesame Street Christmas Carol (2006/PBS)
- Elmo's Christmas Countdown (December 23, 2007/ABC)
- A Muppet Christmas: Letters to Santa (December 17, 2008/NBC)
- Lady Gaga and the Muppets Holiday Spectacular (2013/ABC)
- The Muppets: "Single All the Way" (December 8, 2015) (Season 1, Episode 10)
- Once Upon a Sesame Street Christmas (2016/HBO)
- Fraggle Rock: Back to the Rock: "Night of the Lights" (2022/Apple TV+)
- Sesame Street: "The Nutcracker" (December 1, 2022/HBO Max)
- The First Snow of Fraggle Rock (December 4, 2025/Apple TV+)
- Elmo and Mark Rober's Merry Giftmas (December 8, 2025/Netflix)
- Fraggle Rock: A Holiday Gift (December 4, 2026/Apple TV+)

=== Hanna-Barbera ===
- A Christmas Story (December 9, 1972/syndication)
- Silent Night, Holy Night (1976/syndication)
- Casper's First Christmas (December 18, 1979/NBC)
- Christmas Comes to Pac-Land (December 16, 1982/ABC)
- The Little Troll Prince (1987/syndication)
- The Town Santa Forgot (December 3, 1993/NBC)

==== Yogi Bear ====
- Yogi's First Christmas (1980/syndication)
- Yogi Bear's All Star Comedy Christmas Caper (December 21, 1982/CBS)

==== The Smurfs ====
- The Smurfs' Christmas Special (December 12, 1982/NBC)
- 'Tis the Season to Be Smurfy (December 13, 1987/NBC)
- The Smurfs: A Christmas Carol (December 2, 2011)

=== Chucklewood Critters ===
- The Christmas Tree Train (1983, syndication)
- T'was the Day Before Christmas (1993, syndication)

==== Winnie the Pooh ====
- Welcome to Pooh Corner:
  - Christmas at Pooh Corner (1983/Disney Channel)
  - Christmas is for Sharing (1984/Disney Channel)
- Winnie the Pooh and Christmas Too (December 14, 1991/ABC)
- Seasons of Giving (1999)
- A Very Merry Pooh Year (2002)
- Playtime with Winnie the Pooh
  - Piglet's Christmas Tree/Piglet's Christmas Present (2024)

=== Precious Moments, Inc. ===
- Timmy's Gift: A Precious Moments Christmas (1991)
- Timmy's Special Delivery: A Precious Moments Christmas (1993)

=== VeggieTales ===
- The Toy That Saved Christmas (1996)
- The Star of Christmas (2002)
- Saint Nicholas: A Story of Joyful Giving (2009)
- It's a Meaningful Life (2010)
- The Little Drummer Boy (2011)
- Merry Larry and the True Light of Christmas (2013)
- Beauty and the Beet (2014)

=== DreamWorks Animation ===
- Shrek the Halls (2007/ABC)
- Merry Madagascar (2009/NBC)
- Kung Fu Panda Holiday (2010/NBC)
- Trolls Holiday (2017/NBC)
- How to Train Your Dragon: Homecoming (December 3, 2019/NBC)
- Trolls: Holiday in Harmony (2021/NBC)
- The Bad Guys: A Very Bad Holiday (2023/Netflix)
- Sing: Holiday (2026/Netflix)
- Trolls: Holiday in Family Reunion (2026/Netflix)
- Kung Fu Panda: Holiday in Winter (2026/Netflix)

=== Pixar ===
- Toy Story That Time Forgot (December 2, 2014/ABC)

== Celebrity-hosted and variety shows ==
This list includes U.K. productions shown in the U.S.

- The Colgate Comedy Hour - Abbott and Costello Christmas Show (December 14, 1952/NBC)
- The Judy Garland Christmas Show (December 22, 1963/CBS)
- The Ray Conniff Christmas Show (December 20, 1965)
- The Mitzi Gaynor Christmas Show (December 20, 1967/NBC)
- John Denver's Rocky Mountain Christmas (with The Muppets) (December 10, 1975/ABC)
- The Captain and Tennille Christmas Show (1976)
- The Johnny Cash Christmas Special (1976–1979)
- Paul Lynde: 'Twas the Night Before Christmas (December 7, 1977/ABC)
- A Christmas Special With Love, Mac Davis (December 24, 1979/NBC)
- Rich Little's Christmas Carol (1978)
- Freddie the Freeloader's Christmas Dinner (December 13, 1981/HBO)
- The George Burns Early, Early, Early Christmas Special (1981/NBC)
- A Christmas Dream (December 16, 1984/NBC)
- Barbara Mandrell's Christmas: A Family Reunion Special (December 22, 1986)
- Motown Merry Christmas (1987)
- Dolly Parton: Home For Christmas (December 21, 1990/ABC)
- John Denver: Montana Christmas Skies (1991)
- Vanessa Williams & Friends: Christmas in New York (December 1, 1996/ABC)
- U2: Beautiful Day (November 23, 2001/CBS)
- Victoria's Secret Fashion Show (2002-03, 2015-18 and 2021-present/ABC and 2005-14/CBS)
- Dave Foley's The True Meaning of Christmas Specials (December 22, 2002)
- The Osbourne Family Christmas Special (December 11, 2003/MTV)
- Nick & Jessica's Family Christmas (December 1, 2004/ABC)
- Denis Leary's Merry F#%$in' Christmas (2005/Comedy Central)
- A Colbert Christmas: The Greatest Gift of All (2008/Comedy Central)
- Jeff Dunham's Very Special Christmas Special (2008/Comedy Central)
- CMA Country Christmas (2010–present)
- Jessica Simpson: Happy Christmas (December 4, 2010/PBS)
- A Russell Peters Christmas (December 1, 2011)
- Kelly Clarkson's Cautionary Christmas Music Tale (December 11, 2013/NBC)
- A Pentatonix Christmas Special (December 14, 2016/NBC)
- Gwen Stefani's You Make It Feel Like Christmas (December 12, 2017/NBC)
- A Legendary Christmas with John and Chrissy (November 28, 2018/NBC)
- Darci Lynne: My Hometown Christmas (December 11, 2018/NBC)
- Ken Jeong Cracks Christmas (December 12, 2018/YouTube)
- The Kacey Musgraves Christmas Show (2019/Amazon Prime)
- Holidays with the Houghs (December 16, 2019/NBC)
- A Holly Dolly Christmas (December 6, 2020/CBS)
- Kelly Clarkson Presents: When Christmas Comes Around (December 1, 2021/NBC)
- Michael Bublé's Christmas in the City (December 6, 2021/NBC)
- LCD Soundsystem Holiday Special (2021/Amazon Prime)
- Hannah Waddingham: Home for Christmas (2023/Apple TV+)
- A Very Demi Holiday Special (2023/Roku)
- Barry Manilow's A Very Barry Christmas (December 11, 2023/NBC)
- Jimmy Fallon's Holiday Seasoning Spectacular (December 4, 2024/NBC)
- A Nonsense Christmas with Sabrina Carpenter (December 6, 2024/Netflix)
- Nate Bargatze's Nashville Christmas (December 19, 2024/CBS)
- Josh Groban & Friends Go Home for the Holidays (December 20, 2024/CBS)
- Christmas with Snoop (December 2, 2026/NBC)

=== Bob Hope ===
- The Bob Hope Christmas Special (1953, 1968, 1970, 1980, 1981)
- The Bob Hope Christmas Show (1965, 1985)
- The Bob Hope Vietnam Christmas Show (1966)
- The Bob Hope Christmas Special: Around the World with the USO (1969)
- The Bob Hope Vietnam Christmas Show (1971)
- The Bob Hope All Star Christmas Comedy Special (1977)
- Bob Hope's USO Christmas in Beirut (1984)
- Bob Hope Winterfest Christmas Show (1987)
- Bob Hope's USO Christmas from the Persian Gulf: Around the World in Eight Days (1987)
- Bob Hope's Jolly Christmas Show (1988)
- Bob Hope's Christmas Special from Waikoloa, Hawaii (1989)
- Bob Hope's Christmas Cheer from Saudi Arabia (1991)
- Hope for the Holidays - A Bob Hope Christmas (1993)

=== Bing Crosby ===
- Happy Holidays with Frank and Bing starring Frank Sinatra and Bing Crosby (1957)
- The Bing Crosby Christmas Show (1961, 1962, 1965)
- Christmas with Andre, Bing, and Mary (1962)
- The Hollywood Palace with Bing Crosby (1965, 1966, 1967, 1968)
- Bing and Carol Together Again for the First Time (1969) Bing Crosby, with Carol Burnett
- Goldilocks (1969) Bing Crosby with Kathryn Crosby, Mary Frances Crosby and Nathaniel Crosby along with Avery Schreiber and Paul Winchell
- Bing Crosby's Christmas Show (1970)
- Bing Crosby and the Sounds of Christmas (1971)
- A Christmas with the Bing Crosbys (1972)
- Bing Crosby's Sun Valley Christmas Show (1973)
- A Christmas with the Bing Crosbys (1974)
- Merry Christmas, Fred, from the Crosbys (1975) Bing Crosby, with Fred Astaire
- The Bing Crosby White Christmas Special (1976)
- Bing Crosby's Merrie Olde Christmas (1977) with David Bowie, Twiggy, and Ron Moody
- The Christmas Years (1978) tribute program

=== Perry Como ===
This is only a partial list of Perry Como Christmas programs. He would always include a Christmas-themed program every year while his television series was on the air.

- Perry Como's Christmas In New York (1959)
- The Perry Como Holiday Special (1967)
- Christmas At The Hollywood Palace (1969)
- Perry Como's Winter Show (1971)
- The Perry Como Winter Show (1972, 1973)
- Perry Como's Christmas Show (1974)
- Perry Como's Christmas In Mexico (1975)
- Perry Como's Christmas In Austria (1976)
- Perry Como's Olde Englishe Christmas (1977)
- Perry Como's Early American Christmas (1978)
- Perry Como's Christmas In New Mexico (1979)
- Perry Como's Christmas In The Holy Land (1980)
- Perry Como's French-Canadian Christmas (1981)
- Perry Como's Christmas In Paris (1982)
- Perry Como's Christmas In New York (1983)
- Perry Como's Christmas In London (1984)
- Perry Como's Christmas In Hawaii (1985)
- Perry Como's Christmas In San Antonio (1986)
- Perry Como's Irish Christmas (1994)

=== Andy Williams ===
- The Andy Williams Christmas Special (1964)
- The Andy Williams Christmas Special (1965)
- The Andy Williams Christmas Special (1966)
- The Andy Williams Christmas Special (1967)
- The Andy Williams Christmas Special (1968)
- The Andy Williams Christmas Special (1969)
- The Andy Williams Christmas Special (1970)
- The Andy Williams Christmas Special (1971)
- The Andy Williams Christmas Special (1973)
- The Andy Williams Christmas Show (1974)
- Andy Williams' Early New England Christmas (1982)
- Andy Williams Christmas from Washington (1983)
- Andy Williams and the NBC Kids Search for Santa (NBC/1985)
- The Andy Williams Christmas Show (1994)
- The Daily Show Andy Williams Christmas Special (1997)
- Happy Holidays: The Best of the Andy Williams Christmas Specials (2001)

=== Dean Martin ===
- The Dean Martin and Frank Sinatra Family Christmas Show (1967/NBC)
- Dean Martin's California Christmas (1975)
- Dean Martin's Christmas in California (1977, 1979)
- Dean Martin Christmas Special (1980)
- Dean Martin's Christmas at Sea World (1981)

=== The Osmonds ===
- The Osmond Family Christmas Special (1976/ABC)
- The Osmond Family Christmas Special (1977)
- The Donny and Marie Christmas Special (1977/ABC)
- The Osmond Family Christmas Special (1978/ABC)
- The Donny and Marie Christmas Special (1979/ABC)
- The Osmond Family Christmas Special (1980/NBC)
- Marie Osmond's Merry Christmas (1986)

=== The Carpenters ===
- The Carpenters at Christmas (1977/ABC)
- The Carpenters: A Christmas Portrait (1978)

=== Jackie Gleason ===
- Jackie Gleason's Honeymooners Christmas (1978/CBS)
- The Honeymooners Christmas Special (1977)

=== Julie Andrews ===
- Merry Christmas... with Love, Julie (1979)
- Julie Andrews: The Sound of Christmas (1987/ABC)

=== Amy Grant ===
- Headin' Home For The Holidays (1986/NBC)
- A Christmas To Remember (1999)

=== Kathie Lee Gifford ===
- Kathie Lee Gifford: Looking for Christmas (1994/CBS)
- Kathie Lee Gifford: Home for Christmas (1995/CBS)
- Kathie Lee Gifford: Just in Time for Christmas (1996/CBS)
- Kathie Lee Gifford: We Need a Little Christmas (1997/CBS)
- Kathie Lee Gifford: Christmas Every Day (1998/CBS)

=== Larry the Cable Guy ===
- Larry the Cable Guy's Christmas Spectacular (December 5, 2007/VH1)
- Larry the Cable Guy's Star Studded Christmas Extravaganza (2008/VH1)
- Larry the Cable Guy's Hula-Palooza Christmas Luau (2009/CMT)

=== Mariah Carey ===
- Mariah Carey: Merry Christmas to You (December 13, 2010/ABC)
- Mariah Carey's Merriest Christmas (December 19, 2015/Hallmark Channel)
- Mariah Carey's Magical Christmas Special (December 4, 2020/Apple TV+)
- Mariah Carey: Merry Christmas to All! (December 20, 2022/CBS)

== Television series-related ==
Specials based on a television series but which were not a regular time-slot episode.

- Puff the Magic Dragon Christmas (1980/CBS)
- He-Man and She-Ra: A Christmas Special (December 25, 1985/syndication)
- Care Bears Nutcracker Suite (December 25, 1988/Disney Channel; Canadian production)
- Pee-wee's Playhouse Christmas Special (1988/CBS)
- Shining Time Station: 'Tis a Gift (1990/PBS)
- Inspector Gadget Saves Christmas (December 4, 1992/NBC)
- A Pinky and the Brain Christmas (December 13, 1995/The WB)
- The Munsters' Scary Little Christmas (December 17, 1996/Fox)
- Strawberry Shortcake's Berry Merry Christmas (2003)
- A Very Merry Curb Appeal
- A Very Venture Christmas (December 19, 2004/Cartoon Network-Adult Swim)
- A Colbert Christmas: The Greatest Gift of All! (2008/Comedy Central)

== See also ==
- Apollo 8 Genesis reading
- Christmas in the media
- List of Christmas television specials
- List of United States Christmas television episodes
- List of A Christmas Carol adaptations
- List of Christmas films
- Christmas music
- Santa Claus in film
- List of Halloween television specials
- List of Thanksgiving television specials
