= The Far Arena =

1978 novel by Richard Sapir

- First edition
- Author: Richard Sapir (writing as Richard Ben Sapir)
- Language: English
- Genre: Science fiction
- Published: 1978
- Publication place: United States

The Far Arena is a 1978 novel by Richard Sapir, writing under the slightly modified pen name of Richard Ben Sapir. It chronicles the adventures of Eugeni, a Roman gladiator from the age of Domitian, who, due to a highly unlikely series of events, is frozen in ice for nineteen centuries before being found by the Houghton Oil Company on a prospecting mission in the north Atlantic.

== Plot ==
Lew McCardle is a geologist working for Houghton Oil, which has reason to believe that there is oil in the far north. While running a test drill, the machine accidentally uncovers the frozen body of a man. Lew is given charge of the body, and he immediately calls Semyon Petrovitch, who is a Soviet scientist. Petrovitch, who specializes in cryonics (but not cryogenics, as he explains) immediately takes the body to be revived, explaining that it is easier to treat such a case as alive until it is proven that life cannot be restored. The blood is pumped from the body, and various treatments are administered until, amazingly, he does come back to life. He spends the next fifteen days in a deep sleep, muttering to himself. The mutterings are recorded, but no-one can figure out the language. Finally, Lew McCardle, who has eight years of Latin, sends for a Catholic nun, who joins him and Petrovitch on their quest to sort out the mysteries of the revived man.

== Reception ==
John Wiseman, writing in The Los Angeles Times, found the book a "marvelous read" which moved "like wildfire", despite what some of what he described as "gimmicks"—such as the cameo appearance of Saint Peter. Roy Katz, of The News Beacon, similarly thought the story a "fast paced novel which grabs the reader from first page to last."

== See also ==
- Cryonics
- Ötzi the Iceman
- Haraldskær Woman
