= The Body (2001 film) =

2001 film directed by Jonas McCord

- Theatrical release poster
- Directed by: Jonas McCord
- Written by: Jonas McCord
- Based on: The Body by Richard Sapir
- Produced by: Rudy Cohen
- Starring: Antonio Banderas; Olivia Williams; Jason Flemyng; John Shrapnel; Lillian Lux; John Wood; Derek Jacobi
- Cinematography: Vilmos Zsigmond
- Edited by: Alain Jakubowicz; Lesley Walker
- Music by: Serge Colbert
- Production companies: Avalanche Films; Helkon Media AG; MDP Worldwide
- Distributed by: TriStar Pictures
- Release date: April 20, 2001
- Running time: 109 minutes
- Countries: United States; Israel; Germany
- Language: English
- Budget: $30 million
- Box office: $36,845

The Body is a 2001 mystery thriller drama film written and directed by Jonas McCord. Based on the 1983 novel of the same name by Richard Sapir, it stars Antonio Banderas, Olivia Williams, Jason Flemyng, Lillian Lux, John Wood, and Derek Jacobi. It is a joint American-Israeli-German co-production, shot on-location in Jerusalem, Tel Aviv and Italy.

The plot follows Father Matt Gutierrez (Banderas), a Jesuit priest sent by the Vatican to investigate an archaeologic finding by Dr. Sharon Golban (Williams) which is suspected to be the remains of the body of Jesus Christ. This finding puts Gutierrez's faith and his doubts in constant confrontation with Golban's scientific views, and stirs political tensions between Palestine and Israel, while also shaking the foundations of Christianity itself.

The film was released on April 20, 2001, by TriStar Pictures and received mixed critical reviews.

== Plot summary ==
Dr. Sharon Golban finds an ancient skeleton in Jerusalem in a rich man's tomb. Coloration of the wrist and ankle bones indicates the cause of death was crucifixion. Several artifacts, including a gold coin bearing the marks of Pontius Pilate and a jar dating to 32 AD, date the tomb to the year Jesus died. Faint markings on the skull consistent with thorns, the absence of broken leg bones, occupational markers suggesting the deceased was a carpenter, and a nick on the ribs from a pointed object lead authorities to suspect that these could be the bones of Jesus. The different reactions of politicians, clerics, religious extremists—some prepared to use terror to gain their ends—to the religious, cultural and political implications of the find, make life difficult and dangerous for the investigators as they seek to unearth the truth.

Father Matt Gutierrez is assigned by the Vatican to investigate the case and to protect the Christian faith. He sets out to prove that the bones are not those of Jesus, but as there is more and more evidence to support the claim, his faith begins to waver. Troubled by the case, he turns to Father Lavelle who commits suicide because he cannot reconcile the scientific evidence with his faith. This event causes Father Gutierrez to turn from his faith, but he comes back to it in the end when it is revealed that the body is in fact not Jesus's body but one of his followers who died in a similar way during the First Jewish–Roman War. He also comes to understand that it is the power of the cardinals of the Catholic Church that he is protecting and not the faith, and decides to resign from his priesthood.

== Cast ==
- Antonio Banderas as Father Matt Gutierrez
- Olivia Williams as Dr. Sharon Golban
- Jason Flemyng as Father Walter Winstead
- John Shrapnel as Moshe Cohen
- Derek Jacobi as Father Lavelle
- Lillian Lux as Mrs. Kahn
- John Wood as Cardinal Pesci
- Mohammad Bakri as Abu Yusef
- Makram Khoury as Nasir Hamid
- Sami Samir as Ahmed
- Vernon Dobtcheff as Monsignore
- Jordan Licht as Dorene Golban
- Limor Goldstein as Galic
- Ariel Horowitz as Reb Nechtal
- Arieh Elias as Fahri
- John Glover as Street Performer

== Themes ==
The film deals mainly with two subjects:

- The Israeli–Palestinian conflict in the region where the body is found. Both sides believe that control of the site will give them an upper hand in the conflict.
- The importance of the resurrection of Jesus Christ in the Christian faith.
