= Snowden on Ice =

- Written by: Nancy Carlson, Buz Kohan, Gary Smith, Tony Michelman
- Directed by: Dwight Hemion
- Starring: Ekaterina Gordeeva, Daria Grinkova, Kurt Browning, Kenny Rogers
- Music by: Randy Goodrum
- Country of origin: United States
- Original language: English

Production
- Producers: Dann Netter, Gary Smith, Scott Hamilton
- Editor: Bruce Motyer

Original release
- Network: CBS
- Release: 1997

Snowden on Ice is a musical holiday special aired on CBS in 1997. It was funded by Target Corporation.

== Plot ==
Kate (Ekaterina Gordeeva) and her daughter, Lizzie (Daria Grinkova), moved to Kate's old hometown where Kate was taught to skate by her Grandpa Albert. His spirit lives on in Snowden, a snowman, who wears Albert’s old hat and scarf.

Kate knows that Lizzie will not be accepted if she doesn't know how to skate, so she pushes Lizzie onto the ice. Kate's bitter rival, Shana (Josée Chouinard), and her students give Lizzie the cold shoulder and laugh at her when she falls. Lizzie comes off the ice in tears and Kate is reminded of when she fell down in one of her performances while attempting a difficult movement during her first competition for the Albert Trophy. Kate's fall allowed Shana to win the competition and all succeeding competitions except one that Bret (Kurt Browning) won only because Shana had a broken ankle and pneumonia. However, she still came in second place. This discouraged Kate, leading her to vow never to skate again.

One night, while no one is watching, Kate summons up the courage to finally attempt skating once again. As she puts on her skates, Snowden comes to life. As Kate steps onto the ice her costume dramatically changes. Snowden skates with her, and as he does so changes into a cartoon.

During the competition, Kate decides to spontaneously enter as a late entry. As there are no rules to the competition, she is allowed to perform. She wins and is promptly given the trophy by Shana, who has become less hostile. Scootch (Scott Hamilton), the narrator, Zamboni man, and old friend of Albert's, carries Lizzie to Kate.

At the end, Lizzie goes out on the ice in an attempt to skate, encouraged by her mother's earlier performance. She skates with Snowden for a while before he transforms back into Albert (Kurt Browning), who starts teaching Lizzie how to skate as he had done with Kate. She sees this and smiles.

== Cast ==
- Ekaterina Gordeeva as Kate
- Daria Grinkova as Lizzie
- Josée Chouinard as Shana
- Scott Hamilton as Scootch
- Kurt Browning as Bret
