= The Christmas Shoes (film) =

2002 American-Canadian made-for-television drama film

- Based on: The Christmas Shoes by Donna VanLiere
- Written by: Wesley Bishop
- Directed by: Andy Wolk
- Starring: Rob Lowe; Kimberly Williams
- Music by: Lawrence Shragge
- Countries of origin: United States; Canada
- Original language: English

Production
- Executive producers: Beth Grossbard; Craig Anderson
- Producer: Michael Mahoney
- Cinematography: John Berrie
- Editor: Drake Silliman
- Running time: 94 minutes
- Production companies: Beth Grossbard Productions; Craig Anderson Productions; FremantleMedia North America

Original release
- Network: CBS
- Release: December 1, 2002

Related
- The Christmas Blessing

The Christmas Shoes is a 2002 American-Canadian made-for-television drama film based on the song and the novel of the same name which was broadcast on CBS on December 1, 2002. It was shot in Halifax, Nova Scotia. It is the first in a series of ten books by VanLiere and the first movie made from the series. There have been four additional movies made from the series, The Christmas Blessing (2005), The Christmas Hope (2009), The Christmas Secret (2014) and The Christmas Note (2015).

== Plot ==
Attorney Robert Layton visits a local cemetery before Christmas. He sees a younger man wearing a Boston Red Sox cap visiting a grave.

Years earlier, in the days leading up to Christmas, workaholic Robert sees a pair of red shoes having fallen out of a delivery truck. He returns the shoes to a store owned by Tom Wilson. When Robert's car fails to start, Tom tells him about a repair shop owned by Jack Andrews, whose wife Maggie has congestive heart failure and needs a transplant. Robert's wife Kate takes over Maggie's volunteer job directing the local school's Christmas choir.

Nathan, Jack and Maggie's young son, overhears Maggie telling Kate that she and Jack would go dancing on their anniversary. Nathan goes to Wilson's store and finds the red shoes Robert returned and saves money to buy the shoes by collecting empty cans. Nathan opens up about Maggie's story to his teacher Dalton Gregory, a neighbor of Robert's mother Ellen who consoles him. Ellen gives Nathan her son's old Red Sox cap, then writes a note and puts it in Robert's childhood lunch box.

Maggie does not receive a heart transplant. Ellen sees Dalton loading bags of cans into his car and says she is going to leave the Christmas lights on for a while. When the lights are still on the next morning, Dalton discovers that Ellen has died. Dalton tells Nathan that his wife died eleven years ago, then directs him to find the cans in an alley.

On Christmas Eve, Nathan runs to Tom's store, and Robert arrives shortly after. They convince the store clerk to open the door. Nathan wants to buy the shoes, but the clerk tells him he does not have enough money. Nathan explains that he wants the shoes for his mother, so that she will be beautiful in heaven. Robert pays for the shoes. Overjoyed, Nathan runs home.

Robert leaves the store without the last-minute gifts he had planned to buy. Unable to start his car, he asks Tom for a ride. Nathan gives Maggie the shoes. Robert and Tom arrive at the new location for the Christmas concert and discover that Kate, as well as her and Robert's daughter Lily, are caroling for Maggie. Robert and Kate reconcile. The family sees the light go off in Maggie's room. Robert sees the package his mother Ellen had sent and reads the note inside.

Back in the present, Robert tells the younger man that he likes his Red Sox cap. After the younger man leaves, Robert sees the red shoes on the grave. He realizes the younger man is a now-grown Nathan and calls after him, but Nathan has driven off. Robert smiles.

== Cast ==
- Rob Lowe as Robert Layton
- Kimberly Williams as Maggie Elizabeth Andrews
- Max Morrow as Nathan Andrews, Maggie & Jack's son
- Maria del Mar as Kate Layton, Robert's wife
- Hugh Thompson as Jack Andrews, Maggie's husband
- Dorian Harewood as Dalton Gregory
- Shirley Douglas as Ellen G. Layton, Robert's mother
- Amber Marshall as Lily Layton, Robert & Kate's daughter
- Jeremy Akerman as Tom Wilson
- John Dunsworth as Dr. Julian

== See also ==
- List of Christmas films
