= The Christmas Blessing =

2005 American-Canadian television film

- Based on: The Christmas Blessing by Donna VanLiere
- Written by: Wesley Bishop
- Directed by: Karen Arthur
- Starring: Neil Patrick Harris; Rebecca Gayheart; Rob Lowe; Angus T. Jones; Blake Shelton
- Music by: Lawrence Shragge
- Countries of origin: United States; Canada
- Original language: English

Production
- Executive producers: Beth Grossbard; Craig Anderson
- Producer: Larry Rapaport
- Cinematography: Tom Neuwirth
- Editor: Bridget Durnford
- Running time: 96 minutes
- Production companies: Craig Anderson Productions; Beth Grossbard Productions; FremantleMedia North America

Original release
- Network: CBS
- Release: December 18, 2005

Related
- The Christmas Shoes; The Christmas Hope

The Christmas Blessing is a 2005 American-Canadian made-for-television romantic drama film directed by Karen Arthur which was broadcast on CBS on December 18, 2005. It also featured songs by country artist Blake Shelton, including the hit "Nobody But Me", and "The Christmas Blessing" by Newsong. It is the second in a series of ten books and the second movie made, preceded by The Christmas Shoes (2002). There have been three additional movies made from the book series, The Christmas Hope (2009), The Christmas Secret (2014) and The Christmas Note (2015).

== Plot ==
When Nathan (Neil Patrick Harris), a doctor, loses a patient on the operating table, he decides that being a doctor isn't meant for him, and he wants to give it up. He decides to take a vacation to his hometown, and stay with his father (Hugh Thompson).

While volunteering at the local grade school, he meets Charlie (Angus T. Jones), a young boy who has also lost his mother, and Meghan (Rebecca Gayheart), Charlie's teacher. Charlie and his father have also just arrived in town, to work at estates doing chores. Nathan, searching for the shoes he gave his mother the Christmas she died (Even though in the "17 years later" epilogue of The Christmas Shoes he left them on her grave and walked away), learns that Charlie now has them. And Meghan, wanting to buy a house for those in need, may not be able to.

Soon after his arrival, Nathan learns that Charlie is ailing from an irregular heart defect, and Meghan has cirrhosis of the liver, and will die unless she has a transplant. In the end, it is Charlie who saves her life, by giving her his liver. As a dying wish, he asks Nathan, whom he calls coach, to give her the shoes. And Robert (Rob Lowe), Meghan's friend, buys the house for her. In honor of Charlie, Meghan names the house after him.

== Selected cast ==
- Neil Patrick Harris as Nathan Andrews
- Rebecca Gayheart as Meghan Sullivan, Nathan's love interest
- Angus T. Jones as Charlie Bennett
- Hugh Thompson as Jack Andrews, Nathan's widowed father
- Shaun Johnston as Tucker Bennett, Charlie's father
- Wanda Cannon as Lydia Jones
- Rob Lowe as Robert Layton
- Carey Feehan as Sean Addison
- Blake Shelton as Himself

== Reception ==
CineMagazine rated the film 3 stars.

== See also ==
- List of Christmas films
