= The Body (Sapir novel) =

1983 novel by Richard Ben Sapir

- Author: Richard Sapir
- Genre: Mystery; Thriller
- Publisher: Doubleday
- Publication date: February 11, 1982

The Body (1983) is a mystery/thriller novel by American writer Richard Ben Sapir, co-author of Destroyer series. The book was later made into a 2001 film, The Body, starring Antonio Banderas and Olivia Williams.

== Plot summary ==
When a female archaeologist discovers an ancient skeleton of a man and an Aramaic inscription which reads Melek Yehudayai (King of the Jews), the Israel government invites the Vatican to investigate the matter, as they suspect the body could be that of Jesus Christ. When one of the renowned archaeologist-priests of Vatican committed suicide as a man of broken faith, former soldier and Catholic priest Jim Folan is assigned to continue the investigation. Father Folan arrives in Israel to work with the reluctant archaeologist Sharon Golban, and the mystery deepens with danger and intrigue. Suddenly they find that the Vatican, the United States, the Soviets, Mossad and the Mafia are after the truth.
