= The Christmas Hope =

2009 American-Canadian television film

- Based on: The Christmas Hope by Donna VanLiere
- Written by: Wesley Bishop
- Directed by: Norma Bailey
- Starring: Madeleine Stowe; James Remar; Ian Ziering
- Music by: Lawrence Shragge
- Countries of origin: United States; Canada
- Original language: English

Production
- Producers: Craig Anderson; Beth Grossbard
- Cinematography: Mathias Herndl
- Editor: Robert Lower
- Running time: 90 minutes
- Production company: Beth Grossbard Productions

Original release
- Network: Lifetime
- Release: December 13, 2009

Related
- The Christmas Blessing

The Christmas Hope is a 2009 American-Canadian made-for-television drama film directed by Norma Bailey and starring Madeleine Stowe which was broadcast on Lifetime on December 13, 2009.

The Christmas Hope is the third movie based on a series of ten books by the author. It was preceded by The Christmas Shoes (2002) and The Christmas Blessing (2005). There have been two additional movies made from the series, The Christmas Secret (2014) and The Christmas Note (2015).

== Plot ==
After the recent loss of her son Sean—a minor character in The Christmas Blessing—Patty Addison (Madeleine Stowe) devotes herself to finding homes for needy children. The loss of Sean has strained Patty's relationship with her husband Mark, an airline pilot. But they reconnect emotionally when they take in Emily, a 9-year-old orphaned in a car accident similar to the one that killed Sean.

At the same time Dr. Nathan Andrews—the one character that connects the entire film trilogy—is trying to find the parents of a boy who died in the ER, and Mark is trying to help one of his son's friends. By the end of the film, all three stories are intertwined as they all look for Emily, who has run away.

== Cast ==
- Madeleine Stowe as Patricia Addison
- James Remar as Mark Addison, Patricia's husband
- Ian Ziering as Dr. Nathan Andrews
- Tori Barban as Emily Adams
- Phillip Jarrett as Roy
- Jayne Eastwood as Charlotte
- Devon Weigel as Traci Adams, Emily's mother
- Rebecca Gibson as Megan Andrews (née Sullivan), Nathan's wife
- Daniel Boiteau as Justin
- Garth Merkeley as Sean Addison
- Aaron Hughes as Larry Adams

== See also ==
- List of Christmas films
