= The Christmas Note =

2015 made-for-television film

The Christmas Note is a Christmas film originally broadcast on the Hallmark Movies & Mysteries Channel in 2015. The film is based on the 2011 book of the same name by Donna VanLiere. The Christmas Note is the fifth film from a series of ten books written by VanLiere. It was preceded by four movies made from the series, The Christmas Shoes (2002), The Christmas Blessing (2005), The Christmas Hope (2009), and The Christmas Secret (2014).

== Plot ==
Gretchen Daniels moves back to her hometown of Wilsonville with her son Ethan, at the urging of her husband and Ethan's father, Kyle, who was injured while on deployment and is recovering at a military hospital in Germany.

Ethan wants his dad to come home for Christmas; he writes a letter to Santa asking for such (even saying that he didn't want a bicycle, a baseball glove, or an Xbox). But although Kyle's condition improves, and is originally told he will be able to come home for Christmas, a last minute change threatens those plans.

In the house next door resides Melissa McCreary, who works all the time and doesn't socialize with anyone. One day, Gretchen is approached by a local landlord with a message for Melissa: her mother (Ramona) has died and the apartment needs to be cleared out by the weekend. Gretchen is reluctant to pass along the message, as she barely knows Melissa, but does so anyway, and offers to help her clean out the apartment.

While initially going through the apartment, and later at Ramona's memorial service, Melissa shares that she was not aware that Ramona was ill or had moved back to town; the two hadn't spoken in ten years. Ramona was a workaholic who frequently left Melissa alone with babysitters and was constantly forcing Melissa to move to accommodate her job situation; therefore, they never lived in one place long enough to settle down and make friends. The two fought constantly, which ultimately came to a head when Melissa turned 18; after Ramona announced yet another job relocation this time Melissa refused to go, resulting in her and Ramona having one final argument which broke ties between the two. Melissa tells Gretchen that Ramona left and she moved back to Wilsonville (the only place she ever stayed long enough to feel at home).

While going through Ramona's belongings, Melissa discovers an unfinished note Ramona was writing to her, asking for her forgiveness and telling her that before she was born, Ramona had a previous child that she gave up for adoption. Gretchen (who herself was adopted) convinces the reluctant Melissa to go on a search to find her sibling (convincing her that she could be giving both of them an amazing gift – the gift of family). During the search the two become friends along the way, and Melissa realizes that her decision to isolate herself from Ramona (and anyone else – as she had become a workaholic just like Ramona) was a huge mistake. Ultimately Melissa admits to Gretchen that she lied about her estrangement with Ramona: what really happened is when she and Ramona argued over the planned move, Ramona didn't leave – Melissa simply moved out and asked Ramona never to contact her again. Melissa wishes she could take back her original decision to cut ties with Ramona, and realizes that the note about her sibling was giving Melissa a chance to forgive herself.

Initially believing that her sibling is male, Melissa asks Bruce (a volunteer at a local food pantry, featured in one of her mother's photos) if he is her brother. It turns out he is not, but convinces one of the pantry's main supporters, a local attorney (for whom Gretchen works part time) to assist in the search. At the end, the attorney locates the adoptive records, which reveal that Melissa's sibling is not a brother, but a sister – Gretchen (Ramona had given birth to a girl and immediately turned her over to an adoption agency, who had a prearranged adoption with Gretchen's adoptive parents).

At the town's Christmas event, Kyle surprises everyone by appearing, thanks in part to Melissa who asks Bruce, who was a former soldier, to use any connections he had so that Kyle could come home to recuperate.

== Cast ==
- Jamie-Lynn Sigler—Gretchen Daniels (nee White)
- Leah Gibson—Melissa McCreary
- Greg Vaughan—Kyle Daniels
- Lynda Boyd—Vivian White (mentioned in dialogue as "Vivian Lloyd').
- Dylan Kingwell -- Ethan Daniels
- Barclay Hope -- Phil White (mentioned in dialogue as "Phil Lloyd").
- Nicola Cavendish—Betty
- Lochlyn Munro—Robert Layton (a local attorney who solves the mystery)
- Zachary Gulka—Josh Cooley
- Jeremy Guilbaut—Jason
- William Vaughan—Bruce Adler (credited as William C. Vaughan)
- Gillian Barber—Mrs. Schweiger
- Jessie Fraser—Meegan Andrews (credited as Jessica Fraser)
- Karen Kruper—Kay
- Johanna Marlowe—Kelly
- Iris Quinn—Fern
- Paul Herbert—Landlord
- BJ Harrison—Laurie
- Gelsea Mae—Clerk (uncredited)
- Kelsey Marsland-Anderson—Food Bank Volunteer (uncredited)
- John Specogna—Christmas Fair Attendee (uncredited)

== Differences between the book and film ==
- In the book Gretchen has two children (Ethan and Emma); in the film she has only one (Ethan).
- In the book the family moves to Grandon; in the film the town is Wilsonville. (Wilsonville is also the setting for several other films taken from Donna VanLiere books, such as The Christmas Secret which was produced the year prior, while Grandon is the primary setting for VanLiere's Christmas book series.)
- In the book Ramona is described as a substance abuser (mainly alcohol), sexually promiscuous, and verbally and physically abusive toward Melissa, living in a barren, shoddy and unkempt apartment when she died; in the film she is portrayed as a workaholic (though her relationship with Melissa was troubled) and living in a well-kept apartment with a decent amount of possessions at the time of her death.
- In the book Melissa works for both Wilson's (a local store) and the attorney; in the film Melissa only works for Wilson's. Gretchen has a part-time job with the attorney.
- In the book Ramona reveals in the note that Melissa has two siblings (a brother and a sister); in the film her note only mentions one sibling of undisclosed gender. Also, in the book Melissa reveals the adoptive records to Gretchen disclosing that they are siblings; in the film the attorney does so.
- In the TV-movie, Gretchen's maiden name is "Lloyd".

== See also ==
- List of Christmas films
