= Richard Sapir =

American novelist (1936–1987)

- Born: July 27, 1936; New York City, New York, United States
- Died: January 27, 1987 (aged 50); New Hampshire, United States
- Occupation: Writer
- Writing career
- Notable work: The Destroyer

Richard Ben Sapir (/səˈpɪər/; July 27, 1936 – January 27, 1987) was an American author, best known for The Destroyer series of novels that he co-created with Warren Murphy.

The first Destroyer was written in 1963, while Sapir worked as a city hall reporter in Jersey City and Murphy served as secretary to the city's mayor. Ahead of its time with a plot centered upon a brash young westerner trained in the martial arts by a master assassin from North Korea, they failed to get it published because, according to Murphy, none of them knew anything about publishing. But Sapir's father was a dentist, and one of his patients was a secretary at Pinnacle Books, which agreed to show the manuscript to a Pinnacle editor. The novel was eventually published in June 1971, spawning a highly successful adventure series with over 30 million copies in print by the late 1990s.

Prior to co-creating The Destroyer, Sapir worked as an editor and in public relations. In addition to The Destroyer series, Sapir wrote five novels: Bressio (1975), The Far Arena (1978), The Body (1983), Spies (1984), and Quest (1987), a modern-day search for the Holy Grail. The Body, which was made into a movie in 2001, is about a Jewish archaeologist who finds a skeleton underneath an Arab shopkeeper's basement that might be the body of Jesus and the American Jesuit priest who is sent by the Vatican to investigate.

Richard Sapir was a graduate of Columbia University and lived with his wife in New Hampshire until his death in 1987 from a heart attack.
