= Donna VanLiere =

American writer

Donna VanLiere is an American author of fiction, primarily novels about Christmas.

Her first book, The Christmas Shoes, was a New York Times bestseller, as was The Christmas Blessing, The Christmas Hope, The Christmas Secret, and The Christmas Note, all of which have been adapted into television movies.

== Bibliography ==
- The Christmas Shoes, St. Martin's Press, 2001
- The Christmas Blessing, St. Martin's Press, 2003
- The Christmas Hope, St. Martin's Press, 2005
- The Christmas Promise, St. Martin's Press, 2007
- The Angels of Morgan Hill, St. Martin's Press, 2008
- The Christmas Secret, St. Martin's Press, 2009
- Finding Grace, St. Martin's Press, 2009
- The Christmas Journey, St. Martin's Press, 2010
- The Christmas Note, St. Martin's Press, 2011
- The Good Dream, St. Martin's Press, 2012
- The Christmas Light, St. Martin's Press, 2014
- The Christmas Town, St. Martin's Press, 2016
- The Christmas Star, St Martin's Press, 2018
- The Christmas Table, St Martin's Press, 2020
- The Time of Jacob's Trouble, Harvest House Publishers, 2020
- The Day of Ezekiel's Hope, Harvest House Publishers, 2021
- Daniel's Final Week, Harvest House Publishers, 2022
