= Victor Sen Yung =

American actor (1915–1980)

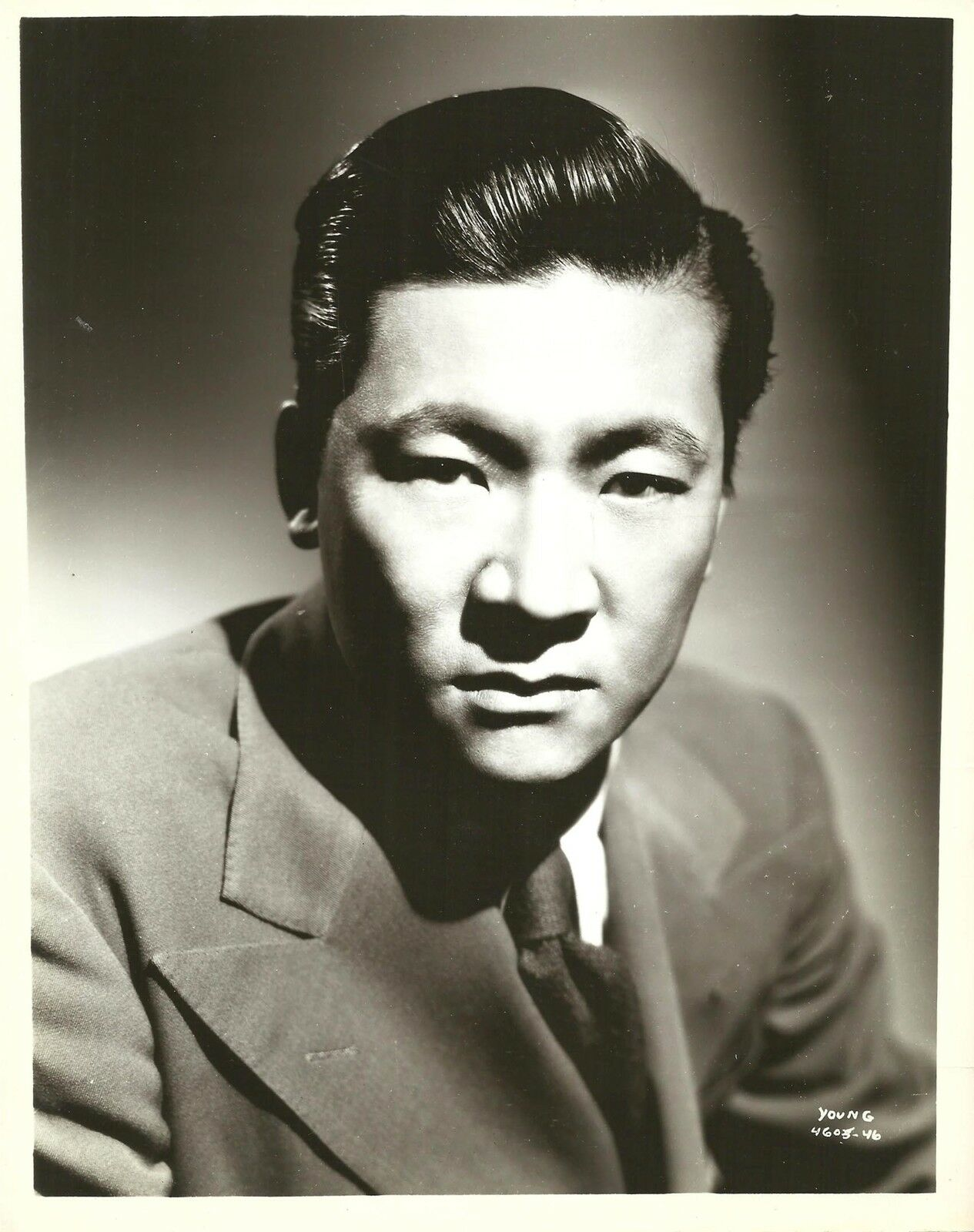
- Sen Yung, c. 1946
- Born: Sen Yew Cheung or Victor Cheung Young; October 18, 1915; San Francisco, California, U.S.
- Died: c. October 31, 1980 (aged 65); North Hollywood, California, U.S.
- Resting place: Greenlawn Memorial Park, Colma, California, U.S.
- Other names: Sen Yung; Sen Young; Victor Sen Young; Victor Young
- Occupation: Actor
- Years active: 1937–1980

Signature
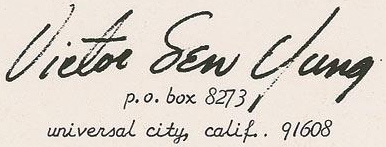

Victor Sen Yung (born Victor Cheung Young or Sen Yew Cheung; Chinese: 森耀祥; October 18, 1915 – c. October 31, 1980) was an American character actor, best known for playing Jimmy Chan in the Charlie Chan films and Hop Sing in the western series Bonanza.

== Early life ==
Sen Yung was born in San Francisco, California, to Gum Yung Sen and his first wife, both immigrants from China. When his mother died during the flu epidemic of 1919, his father placed Victor and his younger sister, Rosemary, in a children's shelter, and returned to his homeland to seek another wife. He returned in 1922 with his new wife, Lovi Shee, once again forming a household with his two children.

== Career ==
=== Charlie Chan films and military service ===
Sen Yung made his first significant acting debut in the 1938 film Charlie Chan in Honolulu, as the Chinese detective's "number two son", Jimmy Chan. In this movie, Sidney Toler replaced the recently deceased Warner Oland as Charlie Chan and Sen Yung replaced Oland's "number one son" Lee, who had been played by Keye Luke. Luke left the series in 1938, leading to the need for a "number two son". Sen Yung played Jimmy Chan in 11 Charlie Chan films between 1938 and 1942. Sen Yung played the character of Jimmy Chan very much as Luke played Lee Chan, namely as the bumbling, Americanized son who constantly hinders his father's work. The cultural clash between Chan père, a Chinese immigrant whose values were fundamentally those of China as expressed in his amusing pseudo-Confucian aphorisms vs. his well meaning, but inept Americanized sons gave the series much of its appeal, together with the fact that for all of Charlie Chan's putdowns of his sons there was a genuine paternal love and warmth being expressed.

Moonlighting from the popular Chan series, Sen Yung won critical acclaim playing the nuanced role of Ong Chi Seng, a young attorney assisting Howard Joyce (played by James Stephenson), defending Leslie Crosbie (played by Bette Davis), accused of murder in the classic Warner Bros. film noir melodrama, The Letter (1940), directed by William Wyler. In common with other Chinese-American actors, Sen Yung was cast in Japanese parts during World War II, such as his role as the treacherous Japanese-American Joe Totsuiko in the 1942 Humphrey Bogart film Across the Pacific.

During World War II he joined the U.S. Army Air Forces just as his erstwhile co-star Sidney Toler was set to revive the dormant Charlie Chan series at Monogram Pictures. According to author James L. Neibaur, Sen Yung's military obligations forced him to decline rejoining the series immediately, but Monogram gave him a standing invitation to work there when his tour of duty was up. He was temporarily replaced in the Charlie Chan series by Benson Fong, who played "number three son" Tommy Chan (and once by Keye Luke's real-life brother, Edwin Luke, as "number four son" Eddie Chan). Sen Yung's military service included work in training films at the First Motion Picture Unit and a role in the Army Air Forces' play and film Winged Victory.

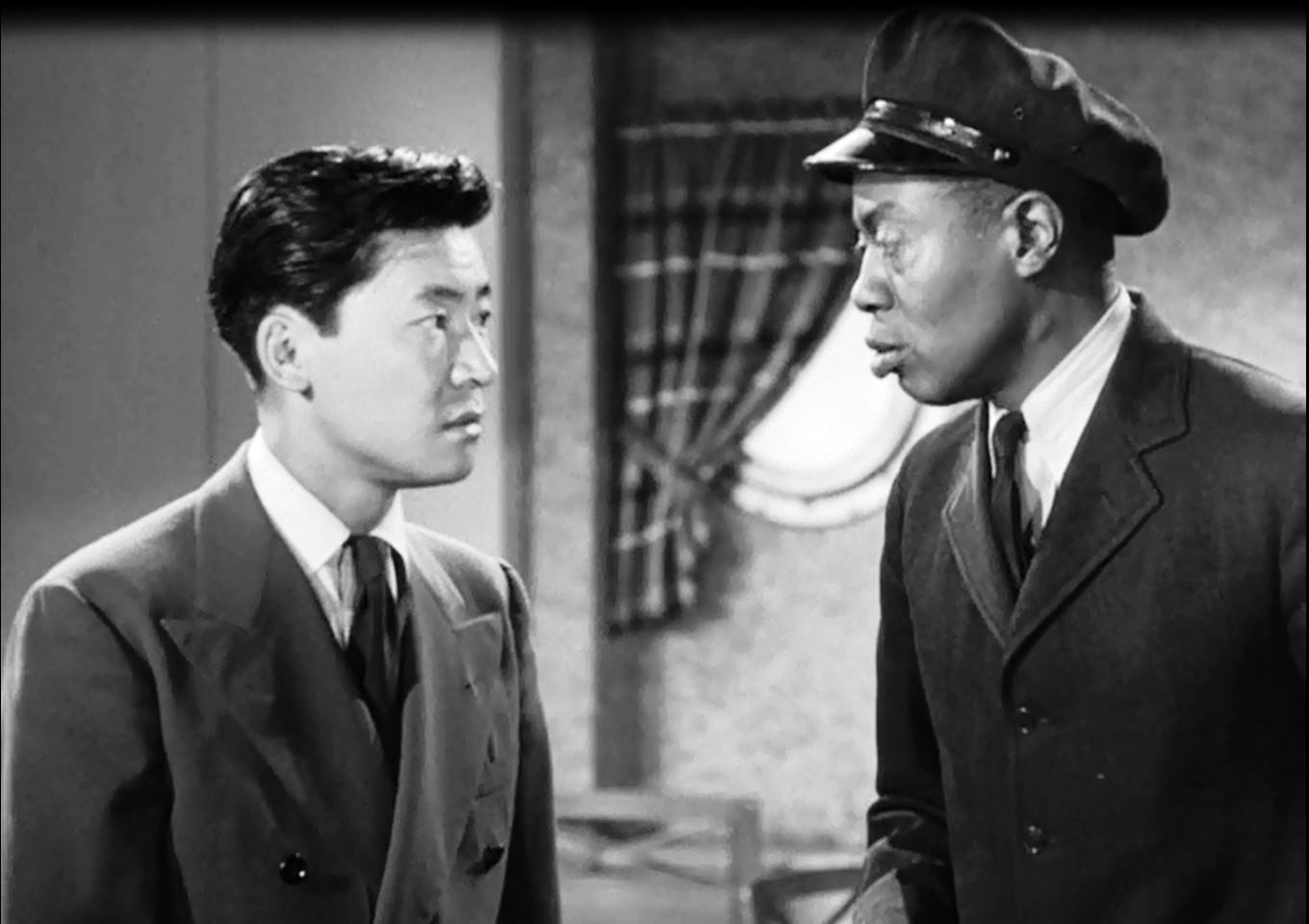
Victor Sen Young and Willie Best in Dangerous Money (1946)

In 1946 Sen Yung resumed his Hollywood career at Monogram, now billed as Victor Sen Young and reunited with Sidney Toler. Toler's health was failing; Monogram was conserving Toler's waning energy, limiting his scenes and giving him long rest periods during filming. To relieve the burden on Toler, Monogram entrusted much of the action to Victor Sen Young; he and either Mantan Moreland or Willie Best shared much of the footage in Toler's final three films, Dangerous Money, Shadows Over Chinatown, and The Trap. The addition of Moreland as Chan's black chauffeur, Birmingham Brown, reflected the fact that by this time the Chan pictures had a significant following among black Americans, who liked a film series that for once did not feature a white hero. Moreland's popularity in the Chan pictures was so great that he was booked for a nationwide vaudeville tour, forcing him to be replaced in Dangerous Money by Willie Best.

Following Toler's death in 1947, Victor Sen Young appeared in five of the remaining six Charlie Chan features. His character "Jimmy" was renamed "Tommy" (author Scott MacGillivray contends that "Jimmy" was so closely associated with Sidney Toler that audiences would miss seeing Toler opposite him, resulting in Monogram making the change).

=== Bonanza ===
Arguably even more than for his work in the Charlie Chan films, Victor Sen Yung is well remembered as "Hop Sing," the irascible cook and general factotum on the iconic television series Bonanza, appearing in 107 episodes between 1959 and 1973. Bonanza series creator David Dortort told the Archive of American Television that the "Hop Sing" character generated massive fandom - "Victor was just absolutely delightful. He loved the part; he loved doing it. In fact, he began to develop fans, to the extent that I wrote him in as the featured part in a number of shows.”

=== Other roles ===
Victor Sen Young had roles in numerous motion pictures and television series, ranging from featured players (affable or earnest Asian characters) to bit roles (clerks, houseboys, waiters, etc.). He was cast as the compassionate Chinese restaurant owner "Quong Kee" in Tombstone, Arizona, in the 1957 episode, "Quong Kee", of the syndicated television anthology series Death Valley Days, hosted by Stanley Andrews. In the story, an aging Quong Kee recalls how in 1881 he brought together the Bostonians Art Gresham (Walter Kelley) and his mother (played by Mary Newton) with the saloon musician Ann Bailey (Eugenia Paul), who after a topsy-turvy romance became Mrs. Art Gresham.

In Bachelor Father (1957–62), Victor Sen Yung had a recurring role as the scheming "Uncle Charlie", a character that Asian rights activist Guy Aoki commends as "a slick, Americanized character. I thought it was great that way back in the ’50s, audiences saw a Chinese American who acted just like anyone else."

In the early 1970s, Sen Yung had a role in seven episodes of the television series Kung Fu. While appearing on the show, he worked alongside actor David Carradine.

== Skilled chef ==
Sen Yung was also an accomplished and talented chef. He frequently appeared on cooking programs, and authored The Great Wok Cookbook in 1974.

== Plane hijacking ==
In 1972, Sen Young was on Pacific Southwest Airlines Flight 710, which was hijacked. The FBI stormed the plane, and in the ensuing gunfire Sen Young was shot in the lower back. He and another wounded passenger survived, but a third passenger and the two hijackers were killed.

In 1975, he appeared on Garry Moore's To Tell The Truth and related the events of the hijacking. With Sen Young dressed in a sportcoat and flanked by two dissimilar imposters, none of the four panelists chose him as the character actor.

== Death and legacy ==
Victor Sen Young died in his North Hollywood home in 1980, aged 65. The actor, who ran a small mail-order Chinese pottery business, was creating clayware and curing the items with an oven, and died of natural gas poisoning from a gas leak. His body was found November 9, but he had reportedly been dead at least ten days, from possibly around October 31.

Some reports suggested that he was murdered, but police ultimately ruled the death accidental. The eulogy at his funeral was given by fellow Bonanza actor Pernell Roberts, who also paid the funeral expenses. He is buried at Greenlawn Memorial Park in Colma, California.

The Victor Sen Young memorial scholarship is awarded each year by the Chinese Alumni Association of the University of California, Berkeley, where Sen Young majored in animal husbandry.

== Selected filmography ==
- The Good Earth (1937) .... Chinese peasant boy (uncredited)
- Double or Nothing (1937) .... Minor Role (uncredited)
- Thank You, Mr. Moto (1937) .... Onlooker with Street Acrobats / Chinese Elevator Operator (uncredited)
- International Settlement (1938) .... Bellboy / Onlooker in Street (uncredited)
- Mr. Moto Takes a Chance (1938) .... Khmer soldier (uncredited)
- Shadows Over Shanghai (1938) .... Wang (as Victor Young)
- Charlie Chan in Honolulu (1938) .... James Chan (as Sen Yung)
- Torchy Blane in Chinatown (1939) .... Chinese Entertainer with Sword (uncredited)
- Charlie Chan in Reno (1939) .... James Chan (as Sen Yung)
- Charlie Chan at Treasure Island (1939) .... Jimmy Chan (as Sen Yung)
- 20,000 Men a Year (1939) .... Harold Chong
- Barricade (1939) .... Minor Role (uncredited)
- Escape to Paradise (1939) .... (uncredited)
- Charlie Chan in Panama (1940) .... Jimmy Chan (as Sen Yung)
- Charlie Chan's Murder Cruise (1940) .... Jimmy Chan (as Sen Yung)
- Charlie Chan at the Wax Museum (1940) .... Jimmy Chan (as Sen Yung)
- The Letter (1940) .... Ong Chi Seng (as Sen Yung)
- Murder Over New York (1940) .... Jimmy Chan (as Sen Yung)
- Dead Men Tell (1941) .... Jimmy Chan (as Sen Yung)
- They Met in Bombay (1941) .... Gin Long (uncredited)
- Charlie Chan in Rio (1941) .... Jimmy Chan (as Sen Yung)
- A Yank on the Burma Road (1942) .... Wing (as Sen Yung)
- Castle in the Desert (1942) .... Jimmy Chan (as Sen Yung)
- Secret Agent of Japan (1942) .... Fu Yen (as Sen Yung)
- Moontide (1942) .... Takeo (as Sen Yung)
- The Mad Martindales (1942) .... Jefferson Gow
- Little Tokyo, U.S.A. (1942) .... Okono
- Across the Pacific (1942) .... Joe Totsuiko (as Sen Yung)
- Manila Calling (1942) .... Armando
- China (1943) .... Lin Wei-third brother (as Sen Yung)
- Night Plane from Chungking (1943) .... Captain Po (as Sen Yung)
- Lost Angel (1943) .... Chinese Man (uncredited)
- Winged Victory (1944) .... Lee Chang (uncredited)
- Betrayal from the East (1945) .... Omaya (as Sen Young)
- Shadows Over Chinatown (1946) .... Jimmy Chan (as Victor Sen Young)
- G.I. War Brides (1946) .... Chinese Waiter (uncredited)
- Dangerous Money (1946) .... Jimmy Chan (as Victor Sen Young)
- Dangerous Millions (1946) .... Lin Chow (as Victor Sen Young)
- The Trap (1946) .... Jimmy Chan (as Victor Sen Young)
- Web of Danger (1947) .... Sam
- The Crimson Key (1947) .... Wing, houseboy
- The Flame (1947) .... Chang (as Victor Sen Young)
- The Chinese Ring (1947) .... Tommy Chan (as Victor Sen Young)
- Intrigue (1947) .... Western Union clerk (uncredited)
- To the Ends of the Earth (1947) .... Chinese pilot (uncredited)
- Docks of New Orleans (1948) .... Tommy Chan (as Victor Sen Young)
- Half Past Midnight (1948) .... Sam, hotel porter
- Shanghai Chest (1948) .... Tommy Chan (as Victor Sen Young)
- The Golden Eye (1948) .... Tommy Chan (as Victor Sen Young)
- Rogues Regiment (1948) .... Rickshaw boy (uncredited)
- The Feathered Serpent (1948) .... Tommy Chan (as Victor Sen Young)
- State Department: File 649 (1949) .... Johnny Han
- Boston Blackie's Chinese Venture (1949) .... Movie Theatre Ticket Taker (uncredited)
- Tuna Clipper (1949) .... Oriental dock worker
- The Sickle or the Cross (1949) .... Major
- Red Light (1949) .... Vincent, Houseboy (uncredited)
- Oh, You Beautiful Doll (1949) .... Houseboy (uncredited)
- Chinatown at Midnight (1949) .... Hotel proprietor
- And Baby Makes Three (1949) .... Lem Kee (uncredited)
- Key to the City (1950) .... Chinese MC at the Blue Duck (uncredited)
- A Ticket to Tomahawk (1950) .... Long Time
- The Breaking Point (1950) .... Mr. Sing
- Woman on the Run (1950) .... Sammy Chung
- Grounds for Marriage (1951) .... Oscar, Chris' valet
- The Groom Wore Spurs (1951) .... Ignacio
- Secrets of Monte Carlo (1951) .... Chinese clerk (uncredited)
- Peking Express (1951) .... Chinese captain (uncredited)
- The Law and the Lady (1951) .... Chinese Manager (uncredited)
- Valley of Fire (1951) .... Laundryman Ching Moon (uncredited)
- Hong Kong (1952) .... Mr. Howe (uncredited)
- The Sniper (1952) .... Tom (uncredited)
- Cripple Creek (1952) .... Chinese interpreter (uncredited)
- Target Hong Kong (1953) .... Johnny Wing (uncredited)
- The Blue Gardenia (1953) .... Waiter (uncredited)
- Forbidden (1953) .... Allan Chung
- Trader Tom of the China Seas (1954) .... Wang
- Jubilee Trail (1954) .... Mickey-Chinese man (uncredited)
- The Shanghai Story (1954) .... Sun Lee
- Port of Hell (1954) .... Detonation Ship Radioman
- Jump Into Hell (1955) .... Lt. Thatch (uncredited)
- Soldier of Fortune (1955) .... Goldie - Hotel Waiter (uncredited)
- The Left Hand of God (1955) .... John Wong
- Blood Alley (1955) .... Cpl. Wang (uncredited)
- The Rawhide Years (1955) .... Chang, steward (uncredited)
- Flight to Hong Kong (1956) .... Airline Ticket Clerk (uncredited)
- Accused of Murder (1956) .... Hank-Bayliss' houseboy (uncredited)
- Men in War (1957) .... North Korean prisoner / sniper
- She Demons (1958) .... Sammy Ching
- Jet Attack (1958) .... Capt. Chon
- The Hunters (1958) .... Korean farmer
- The Saga of Hemp Brown (1958) .... Chang - Bartender (uncredited)
- Flower Drum Song (1961) .... Frankie Wing
- Confessions of an Opium Eater (1962) .... Wing Young
- A Flea in Her Ear (1968) .... Oke Saki
- The Hawaiians (1970) .... Chun Fat (uncredited)
- The Killer Elite (1975) .... Wei Chi
- The Man with Bogart's Face (1980) .... Mr. Wing (final film role)

== Television ==
- Terry and the Pirates 2 episodes (Oriental in "Little Mandarin") (Taiwan in "The Randall Affair") (1953)
- Adventures of Superman 1 episode (Harry Wong in "The Riddle of the Chinese Jade") (1953)
- Chevron Theatre 1 episode (Yin Yun in "Black Lead") (1953)
- Waterfront 1 episode (Cecil Imai in "Fog Bound") (1954)
- Biff Baker, U.S.A. 1 episode (Yin Yun in "Black Lead") (1954)
- Stories of the Century 1 episode (Chang (uncredited) in "Black Bart") (1954)
- Your Favorite Story 1 episode ("The Man Trap") (1954)
- Captain Midnight 1 episode (Ling in "The Lost Moon") (1954)
- Medic 1 episode (Dr. Nagano in "Flash of Darkness") (1955) as Victor Sen-Yung
- The Star and the Story 1 episode (Peng in "The Back to Beyond") (1955)
- Crusader 1 episode (Lu Chen in "A Little Friend") (1956)
- The Lone Ranger (ABC) 1 episode (Lee Po in "The Letter Bride") (1956) as Victor Sen Young
- Crossroads 1 episode (Sam Lu in "Big Sombrero") (1957)
- Richard Diamond, Private Detective 1 episode (Magan in "Chinese Honeymoon") (1958)
- Navy Log 1 episode (Red Officer in "One Grand Marine") (1958)
- Broken Arrow 1 episode (Ling Tang in "Courage of Ling Tang") (1958)
- Death Valley Days 1 episode (Quon Lee in "Quon Lee") (1958)
- Mike Hammer 1 episode ("The Last Aloha") (1959)
- Yancy Derringer 1 episode (Hon Lee in "The Quiet Firecracker") (1959)
- Man Without a Gun 1 episode (Ho Wang in "Daughter of the Dragon") (1959)
- Bronco 1 episode (Mr. Fong in "Game at the Beacon Club") (1959)
- Shotgun Slade 1 episode (Willy Sing - Tong man in "Sudden Death") (1960)
- Thriller 1 episode (Bartender in "The Twisted Image") (1960)
- Checkmate 1 episode (Han in "Terror From the East") (1961)
- Hong Kong 2 episodes (Yang in "Blind Bargain") (1960) (Tung Poy in "Nightcry") (1961)
- The Rifleman 1 episode (Wang Chi in "The Queue") (1961)
- Perry Mason (CBS) 2 episodes (Mickey Fong in "The Case of the Garrulous Gambler") (1959) (Sheng in "The Case of the Malicious Mariner") (1961)
- Bachelor Father 6 episodes (Cousin Charlie Fong/Lee) (1960–1961)
- The Jack Benny Program 1 episode (Chinese cafeteria employee in "Jack Goes to Cafeteria") (1961)
- Follow the Sun 1 episode (Wong in "Annie Beeler's Place") (1962)
- Ensign O'Toole 1 episode (Shopkeeper in "Operation Kowana") (1962)
- Hawaiian Eye 3 episodes (Archibald Chu Sin in "Secret of the Second Door") (1959) (Al in "Vanessa Vanishes") (1960) (Sam in "Blow Low, Blow Blue") (1963)
- Mickey 1 episode (Fu Chu man in "The Way the Fortune Cookie Crumbles") (1964)
- Kraft Suspense Theatre 1 episode (Captain Fong in "Jungle of Fear") (1965)
- Mister Ed 1 episode (Waiter in "Coldfinger") (1965)
- The Man From U.N.C.L.E. 1 episode (Servant in "The Abominable Snowman Affair") (1966)
- The F.B.I. 2 episodes (Joseph Sakanishi in "The Hiding Place") (1966) (Mayor Eto in "The Death Wind") (1966)
- Gomer Pyle, USMC 1 episode (Businessman in "You Bet Your Won Ton") (1967)
- I Spy 2 episodes (Li Wing in "Weight of the World") (1965) (Han in "Pinwheel") (1968)
- The Wild Wild West 1 episode (Baron Kyosai in "The Night of the Camera" (1968)
- Hawaii Five-O 1 episode (Dr. Leo Kuh in "Face of the Dragon") (1969)
- Here's Lucy 2 episodes (Waiter in "Lucy's Birthday") (1968) (Murphy in "Lucy and the Generation Gap") (1969)
- Get Smart 2 episodes (Yamasaki in "A Tale of Two Tails") (1968) (Abe Fu Yung in "I Am Curiously Yellow") (1970)
- Night Gallery 1 episode (Joseph the butler in "Rare Objects") (1972)
- Bonanza 106 episodes Hop Sing (1959–1973)
- The Paul Lynde Show 1 episode (Mr. Fong in "Back Talk") (1973)
- The Red Pony (TV movie) (Mr. Sing/Carni man/Mr.Green) (1973)
- Kung Fu 7 episodes (1972–1974)
- Police Woman 1 episode (Ah Choy in "Nothing Left to Lose") (1975)
- Barbary Coast 1 episode (Soong in "Guns for a Queen") (1975)
- Isis 1 episode (Mr. Chen in "Year of the Dragon") (1976)
- How the West Was Won 1 episode (Hospital attendant in "China Girl") (1979)

== Books ==
- Backer, Roy (2012). Mystery Movie Series of 1930s Hollywood. Jefferson: McFarland. ISBN 9780786490189.
- Huang, Yunte (2010). Charlie Chan: The Untold Story of the Honorable Detective and His Rendezvous with American History. New York: Norton. ISBN 9780393079166.
