= The Jade Mask =

1945 film by Phil Rosen

- Directed by: Phil Rosen
- Written by: Earl Derr Biggers (characters); George Callahan
- Produced by: James S. Burkett
- Starring: Sidney Toler
- Cinematography: Harry Neumann
- Edited by: Richard C. Currier
- Music by: Dave Torbett
- Production company: Monogram Pictures
- Distributed by: Monogram Pictures
- Release date: January 26, 1945
- Running time: 66 minutes
- Country: United States
- Language: English

The Jade Mask is a 1945 film featuring Sidney Toler as Charlie Chan and the only appearance of Number Four Son, Eddie Chan, played by Edwin Luke, the real-life younger brother of Keye Luke, who had depicted Number One Son throughout the 1930s.

== Plot ==
Charlie Chan, along with #4 son Eddie and chauffeur, Birmingham Brown, looks into the apparent murder of an eccentric scientist in a spooky mansion.

Although the scientist had been shot with a silenced pistol, further murders are committed with poison darts, with one narrowly missing Chan. Later, Chan discovers the dead scientist's huge collection of ventriloquist dummies are the key to the murders.

== Cast ==
- Sidney Toler as Charlie Chan
- Edwin Luke as Eddie Chan
- Mantan Moreland as Birmingham Brown
- Hardie Albright as Walter Meeker
- Frank Reicher as Harper
- Janet Warren as Jean Kent
- Cyril Delevanti as Roth
- Alan Bridge as Sheriff Mack
- Dorothy Granger as Stella Graham
