= The Feathered Serpent (1948 film) =

1948 film by William Beaudine

- Theatrical release poster
- Directed by: William Beaudine
- Written by: Oliver Drake (story and adaptation); Earl Derr Biggers (character); Hal Collins (uncredited)
- Produced by: James S. Burkett
- Starring: Roland Winters
- Music by: Edward J. Kay
- Production company: Monogram Productions
- Distributed by: Monogram Distributing Corp.
- Release date: December 19, 1948
- Running time: 60 minutes
- Country: United States
- Language: English

The Feathered Serpent (also titled Charlie Chan in the Feathered Serpent) is a 1948 American mystery film, the fifth of six in which Roland Winters portrayed Charlie Chan. It is the only Chan film which featured both Keye Luke and Victor Sen Yung together. Luke had been cast in the later Warner Oland Chan films while Yung appeared primarily in the Sidney Toler Chan movies. This was Yung's last Chan movie. Luke appeared in one more with Roland Winters, the last of the Chan films, Sky Dragon (1949).

== Plot ==
In Mexico, an expedition prepares to look for two missing archeologists, Professors Scott and Farnsworth, who had been searching for a lost Aztec temple, but have been missing for two months. Charlie Chan, is on his way to Mexico City for a vacation with sons one and two, Lee and Tommy, along with chauffeur and assistant, Birmingham Brown. As they near the town of San Pablo, they sight Professor Scott who is delirious and collapsed near the road. Later, in town, the revived Scott explains that he and Farnsworth had found the lost temple, but they were held hostage and forced to assist with the looting of priceless Aztec artifacts from the temple. However, before Scott can reveal the name his captor, he is murdered. Chan, his sons, and Birmingham join the search party that has been organized to find Farnsworth and the lost temple.

== Cast ==
- Roland Winters as Charlie Chan
- Mantan Moreland as Birmingham Brown
- Keye Luke as Lee Chan
- Victor Sen Yung as Tommy Chan
- Carol Forman as Sonia Cabot
- Robert Livingston as John Stanley
- Nils Asther as Professor Paul Evans
- Beverly Jons as Joan Farnsworth
- Martin Garralaga as Pedro Lopez
- George J. Lewis as Captain Juan Gonzalez
- Leslie Denison as Professor Henry Farnsworth
