= Flight 710 =

Flight 710 may refer to:

- Northwest Orient Airlines Flight 710, crashed on 17 March 1960
- Pacific Southwest Airlines Flight 710, hijacked on 5 July 1972
- Air Illinois Flight 710, crashed on 11 October 1983
- Widerøe Flight 710, crashed on 6 May 1988
