= Dead Men Tell =

1941 film by Harry Lachman

- Movie poster
- Directed by: Harry Lachman
- Written by: Earl Derr Biggers (characters); John Larkin
- Produced by: Ralph Dietrich; Walter Morosco
- Starring: Sidney Toler; Sheila Ryan; Victor Sen Yung
- Cinematography: Charles G. Clarke
- Edited by: Harry Reynolds
- Music by: Emil Newman
- Production company: Twentieth Century-Fox
- Distributed by: Twentieth Century-Fox
- Release date: March 28, 1941
- Running time: 61 minutes
- Country: United States
- Language: English

Dead Men Tell is a 1941 American mystery film directed by Harry Lachman and starring Sidney Toler, Sheila Ryan and Victor Sen Yung. Toler played Charlie Chan in 22 feature films, beginning with Charlie Chan in Honolulu (1938), and ending with The Trap (1946). The first 11 Charlie Chan films with Toler were produced by 20th Century Fox Studios, thereafter sold to Monogram Pictures.

The interiors for Dead Men Tell were filmed in 1941 at Fox Studios in Hollywood. Exterior shots were filmed on the 20th Century Fox backlot, which is now Century City.

== Plot ==
Charlie Chan is engaged by an heir to solve a mystery on a boat. Miss Nodbury seeks a pirate treasure on Cocos Island, and her ship has recently hosted a museum of pirate lore. For safety, she has split her map into four pieces, which she gave to some of the passengers whom she has invited, but tells no one who they are. When she is given a fright and succumbs to her heart disease, Chan must clear up the mystery while the ship is still at the dock.

Miss Nodbury is the granddaughter of notorious pirate "The Black Hook", whose ghost supposedly is haunting the ship—and the sight of it was supposedly what killed her. Charlie Chan has arrived to retrieve his No.2 son, who had intended to stow away on the ship for the adventure of it. After being released from a locked coffin, Jimmy wanders into a tough waterfront bar and is lucky to leave in one piece(he is thrown in the water).

All of the passengers were summoned to the ship by mysterious anonymous notes. Movie actor Charles Thursday was hoping to take a quiet honeymoon with his new wife. Bill Lydig, ostensibly a newspaper reporter; is quickly revealed to be an escapee from San Quentin. And psychiatrist Anne Bonney is doing a poor job of keeping track of her patient Gene La Farge;a cadaverous-looking mental case. Lydig is found smothered to death below decks---he had picked somebody's pocket for part of the treasure map and the murderer stole it back. The Captain of the ship refuses to meet his passengers for good reason. He is convinced one of them abandoned him on an island to die years ago and that the bait of the treasure will lure him back. Revenge is heavily on the Captain's mind.

Eventually, the murderer has 3 pieces of the map and Chan the 4th. The killer is caught trying to regain the fourth piece, with the help of The Captain.

== Cast ==
- Sidney Toler as Charlie Chan
- Sen Yung as Jimmy Chan
- Sheila Ryan as Kate Ransome
- Robert Weldon as Steve Daniels
- Don Douglas as Jed Thomasson
- Katharine Aldridge as Laura Thursday
- Paul McGrath as Charles Thursday / Mr. Parks
- George Reeves as Bill Lydig
- Ethel Griffies as Miss Patience Nodbury
- Lenita Lane as Dr. Anne Bonney
- Milton Parsons as Gene La Farge, patient of Dr. Bonney
- Stanley Andrews as Inspector Vesey (uncredited)
- Lee Tong Foo as Wu Mei, Ship's Cook (uncredited)
- Truman Bradley as Ship's Captain
- GERTIE The Talking Parrot

== Critical reception ==
A review of the film in The New York Times described it as "all tricked out in spooky atmosphere and enough false scents to give a bloodhound a bad case of schizophrenia," and noted that "[w]isps of plot, like the fog over the treasure hunter's ship, trail across the screen and evaporate" and "[m]ost of the proceedings, however, have precious little connection with the plot." Variety reported that the film "is a standard entry in the Charlie Chan series," that it "sticks close to the Chan formula, but drags in too many suspects for general credulity," and "No. 2 son weaves in and out to assist the audience in tabbing the wrong suspect."
