= Tuna Clipper =

1949 film by William Beaudine

- Directed by: William Beaudine
- Written by: Scott Darling
- Produced by: Lindsley Parsons
- Starring: Roddy McDowall; Elena Verdugo; Roland Winters; Peter Mamakos
- Cinematography: William A. Sickner
- Edited by: Ace Herman
- Music by: Edward J. Kay
- Production company: Monogram Pictures
- Distributed by: Monogram Pictures
- Release date: April 10, 1949
- Running time: 77 minutes
- Country: United States
- Language: English

Tuna Clipper is a 1949 American drama film directed by William Beaudine and starring Roddy McDowall, Elena Verdugo and Roland Winters. It was one of a series of films McDowall made for Monogram.

== Plot ==
A young man goes to work on a tuna boat to earn money to pay off debts. When his friend Frankie Pereira fails to place the wager of a ruffian named Ransom at the racetrack and the 10-to-1 longshot wins, Alec MacLennan is left holding the bag after Frankie flees. Forced to pay off the debt, Alec takes a job on the Pereira family's tuna fishing boat.

Frankie's tough brother Silvestre objects to Alec's presence and bullies him. After a while, their sister Bianca notices that the hard-working Alec never has any of his salary. She finds out how he is being extorted by Ransom, who is doing likewise to her brother after finding Frankie working as a stable boy at the track. Ransom's chicanery discovered, Alec is forgiven by all.

== Cast ==
- Roddy McDowall as Alec MacLennan
- Elena Verdugo as Bianca Pereira
- Roland Winters as E.J. Ransom
- Peter Mamakos as Capt. Manuel Pereira
- Rick Vallin as Silvestre Pereira
- Michael Vallon as Papa Pereira
- Russell Simpson as Capt. Fergus MacLennan
- Doris Kemper as Anne MacLennan
- Dickie Moore as Frankie Pereira
- Richard Avonde as Pete, a Pereira crewman
- Victor Sen Yung as Oriental Dock Worker

== Reception ==
The film was reviewed by François Truffaut who described it as "A scenario whose charm lies in its modesty and honesty".

== Bibliography ==
- Dixon, Wheeler Winston. Early Film Criticism of François Truffaut. Indiana University Press, 1993.
- Marshall, Wendy L. William Beaudine: From Silents to Television. Scarecrow Press, 2005.
