= Roland Winters =

American actor (1904–1989)

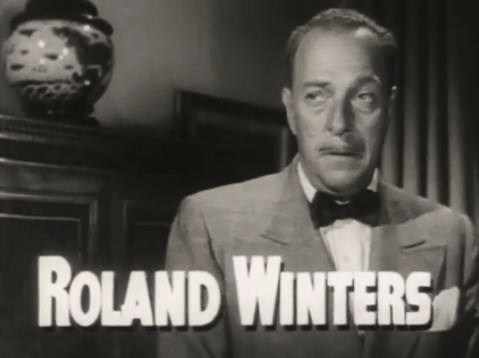
- Roland Winters in A Dangerous Profession (1949) trailer
- Born: Roland Winternitz; November 22, 1904; Boston, Massachusetts, U.S.
- Died: October 22, 1989 (aged 84); Englewood, New Jersey U.S.
- Occupation: Actor
- Years active: 1924–1982
- Known for: Charlie Chan
- Spouse: Ada Howe

Roland Winters (born Roland Winternitz; November 22, 1904 – October 22, 1989) was an American actor who played many character parts in films and television but today is best remembered for portraying Charlie Chan in six films in the late 1940s.

== Early years ==
Winters was born Roland Winternitz on November 22, 1904, in Boston, Massachusetts, the son of Antoinette (Iversen) and Felix Winternitz, a violinist and composer who was teaching at New England Conservatory of Music. His father was born in Austria and his mother in Germany.

== Charlie Chan films ==
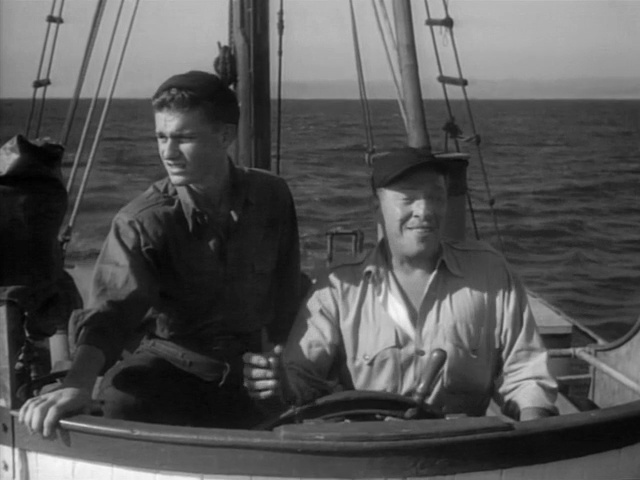
Roddy McDowall and Roland Winters in Killer Shark (1950)

Monogram Pictures selected Winters to replace Sidney Toler in the Charlie Chan film series after Toler's death just as Toler had been chosen to succeed Warner Oland after Oland's death.

Winters was 44 when he made the first of his six Chan films, The Chinese Ring in 1947. His other Chan films were Docks of New Orleans (1948), Shanghai Chest (1948), The Golden Eye (1948), The Feathered Serpent (1948), and Sky Dragon (1949). He also had character roles in three other feature films while he worked on the Chan series.

Yunte Huang, in Charlie Chan: The Untold Story of the Honorable Detective and His Rendezvous with American History, noted differences in the actors' appearances, especially that Winters's "tall nose simply could not be made to look Chinese." Huang also cited the actor's age, writing, "at the age of forty-four, he also looked too young to resemble a seasoned Chinese sage." Keye Luke, who played Chan's son opposite Winters, was actually five months older than Winters.

Roland Winters is considered by some fans to be the least effective of the Chan impersonators, but other observers are quick to defend Winters's portrayals. Ken Hanke wrote in his book Charlie Chan at the Movies: History, Filmography, and Criticism: "Roland Winters has never received his due ... Winters brought with him a badly needed breath of fresh air to the series." He cited "the richness of the approach and the verve with which the series was being tackled" during the Winters era." Similarly, Howard M. Berlin, in his book, Charlie Chan's Words of Wisdom, commented that "Winters brought a much needed breath of fresh air to the flagging film series with his self-mocking, semi-satirical interpretation of Charlie, which is very close to the Charlie Chan in Biggers' novels."

== Later films and television ==
After the series finished, Winters continued to work in film and television until 1982. He was in the movies So Big and Abbott and Costello Meet the Killer, Boris Karloff, and played Elvis Presley's father in Blue Hawaii and a judge in the Elvis film Follow That Dream. He made appearances as the boss on the early TV series Meet Millie, guest-starred in the premiere episode ("Adventures of a Model") of Colgate Theatre in 1958 and in a 1965 episode ("Anywhere I Hang My Hat Is Home") of The Cara Williams Show, and made appearances in the courtroom drama Perry Mason. In 1965 he played murderer Archer Bryant in "The case of the Telltale Tap". In the 1965-66 season he was a TV series regular, playing publisher Leonard Costello, boss of Dick Smothers on the short-lived sitcom The Smothers Brothers Show. In one 1968 episode of the television series Bewitched ("Man of the Year"), he played the normally unseen McMann of McMann and Tate. He also portrayed Mr. Gimbel in Miracle on 34th Street in 1973.

== Death ==
Winters died at the age of 84 as the result of a stroke at the Actor's Fund Nursing Home in Englewood, New Jersey on October 22, 1989.

== Selected filmography ==
- Citizen Kane (1941) – Newspaperman at Trenton Town Hall (uncredited)
- 13 Rue Madeleine (1946) – Van Duyval (uncredited)
- The Chinese Ring (1947) – Charlie Chan
- Docks of New Orleans (1948) – Charlie Chan
- Shanghai Chest (1948) – Charlie Chan
- The Golden Eye (1948) – Charlie Chan
- Cry of the City (1948) – Ledbetter
- The Return of October (1948) – Colonel Wood
- Kidnapped (1948) – Captain Hoseason
- The Feathered Serpent (1948) – Charlie Chan
- Tuna Clipper (1949) – E.J. Ransom
- Sky Dragon (1949) – Charlie Chan
- Abbott and Costello Meet the Killer, Boris Karloff (1949) – T. Hanley Brooks
- Once More, My Darling (1949) – Colonel Head
- A Dangerous Profession (1949) – Jerry McKay
- Malaya (1949) – Bruno Gruber
- Guilty of Treason (1950) – Soviet Comissar Belov
- Captain Carey, U.S.A. (1950) – Manfredo Acuto
- Killer Shark (1950) – Jeffrey White
- Underworld Story (1950) – Stanley Becker
- Convicted (1950) – Vernon Bradley, Attorney
- Between Midnight and Dawn (1950) – Leo Cusick
- To Please a Lady (1950) – Dwight Barrington
- The West Point Story (1950) – Harry Eberhart
- Sierra Passage (1950) – Sam Cooper
- Inside Straight (1951) – Alexander Tomson
- Raton Pass (1951) – Sheriff Périgord
- Follow the Sun (1951) – Dr. Graham
- She's Working Her Way Through College (1952) – Fred Copeland
- A Lion Is in the Streets (1953) – Prosecutor (uncredited)
- So Big (1953) – Klaas Pool
- Bigger Than Life (1956) – Dr. Ruric
- Top Secret Affair (1957) – Senator Burdick
- Jet Pilot (1957) – Colonel Sokolov
- Never Steal Anything Small (1959) – Doctor
- The Iceman Cometh (1960) (TV movie) - Jimmy Tomorrow
- Everything's Ducky (1961) – Captain Lewis Bollinger
- Blue Hawaii (1961) – Fred Gates
- The Alfred Hitchcock Hour (1962) (Season 1 Episode 5: "Captive Audience") - Ivar West / Ivar Waverly
- Follow That Dream (1962) – Judge
- Loving (1970) – Plommie
- Miracle on 34th Street (1973) (TV Movie) – Mr. Gimbel
- The Dain Curse (1978) (TV Mini-Series) – Hubert Collinson
