= Docks of New Orleans =

1948 film by Derwin Abrahams

- Directed by: Derwin Abrahams
- Written by: William Scott Darling
- Based on: Charlie Chan by Earl Derr Biggers
- Produced by: James S. Burkett
- Starring: Roland Winters; Virginia Dale; Mantan Moreland
- Cinematography: William A. Sickner
- Edited by: Ace Herman; Otho Lovering
- Music by: Edward J. Kay
- Production company: Monogram Pictures
- Distributed by: Monogram Pictures
- Release date: March 21, 1948
- Running time: 64 minutes
- Country: United States
- Language: English

Docks of New Orleans is a 1948 American mystery film directed by Derwin Abrahams and starring Roland Winters, Virginia Dale and Mantan Moreland. It featured Winters in his second appearance as Charlie Chan, having replaced Sidney Toler in the role.

== Plot ==
Plot follows very closely that of Mr. Wong, Detective.

== Cast ==
- Roland Winters as Charlie Chan
- Virginia Dale as Rene Blanchette
- Mantan Moreland as Birmingham Brown
- John Gallaudet as Capt. Pete McNalley
- Victor Sen Yung as Tommy Chan
- Carol Forman as Nita Aguirre
- Douglas Fowley as Grock
- Harry Hayden as Oscar Swenstrom
- Howard Negley as Andre Pereaux
- Stanley Andrews as Theodore Von Scherbe
- Emmett Vogan as Henri Castanaro
- Boyd Irwin as Simon Lafontanne
- Rory Mallinson as Thompson
- George J. Lewis as Police Sgt. Dansiger
- Ferris Taylor as Dr. Doobie
- Haywood Jones as Mobile Jones
- Dian Fauntelle as Mrs. Swenstrom
- Eric Wilton as Watkins the Butler
- Wally Walker as LaFontanne's Chauffeur
- Larry Steers as Doctor

== Bibliography ==
- Drew, Bernard A. Motion Picture Series and Sequels: A Reference Guide. Routledge, 2013.
