= Let's Go Collegiate =

1941 film by Jean Yarbrough

- Directed by: Jean Yarbrough
- Written by: Edmond Kelso (story and screenplay)
- Produced by: Lindsley Parsons
- Starring: Frankie Darro; Marcia Mae Jones; Jackie Moran; Keye Luke
- Cinematography: Mack Stengler
- Edited by: Arthur Roberts
- Music by: Edward Kay; Harry Tobias (Lyrics)
- Production company: Monogram Pictures
- Distributed by: Monogram Pictures
- Release date: September 12, 1941
- Running time: 62 minutes
- Country: United States
- Language: English

Let's Go Collegiate is a 1941 American musical comedy film directed by Jean Yarbrough and starring Frankie Darro, Marcia Mae Jones, Jackie Moran and Keye Luke. It was produced and distributed by Monogram Pictures. It was released under the alternative title Farewell to Fame in the United Kingdom.

== Plot ==
Frankie is the coxswain on the rowing team at Rawley University. His friend Tad is a stroke on the crew, president of the Kappa Psi Delta fraternity, and leader of the campus swing band. Rawley's administrators are eagerly awaiting the arrival of renowned athletic star Bob Terry. Tad learns that Terry has been drafted to the army and will not be joining the crew, nor will he be attending the party welcoming him. Frankie and Tad don't have the hearts to tell their girlfriends Midge and Bess, who have worked hard to prepare the party, and instead look for a replacement for Bob for the evening. They find truck driver Hercules "Herk" Bevans loading a safe onto his truck singlehanded. After some convincing, Herk reluctantly accepts the offer to pose as Bob. Herk enjoys the party and flirts with both Bess and Midge, using guttersnipe slang in contrast to the actual students. He decides to stay on campus and join the team as "Bob Terry," despite his aversion to boats. Frankie cures Herk's nautical nausea with seasick pills.

The fraternity gang of Frankie, Tad, Buck, and Jeff work frantically behind the scenes to keep the fake Terry on the team. They coach him not to make social errors with his uncultured speech, and they tutor him in his homework so thoroughly that they themselves risk failing their college courses. Bess breaks up with Tad and lets him know that she is going to marry "Bob Terry." Midge breaks up with Frankie as well, giving the same reason.

On the day of the regatta, Bess and Midge learn of their mutual engagement to Herk. During the race, Frankie runs out of seasick pills and gives Herk moth balls instead. This energizes Herk tremendously and the crew wins. After the race, Herk is arrested for bank robbery. Frankie and Tad reunite with their girlfriends, and explain that "Bob Terry" has been drafted. As Herk is led away, an announcer explains that Terry will be spending the next few years "in federal service."

== Cast ==
- Frankie Darro as Frankie Monahan
- Marcia Mae Jones as Bess Martin
- Jackie Moran as Tad
- Keye Luke as Buck Wing
- Mantan Moreland as Jeff
- Frank Sully as Hercules "Herk" Bevans
- Gale Storm as Midge
- Billy Griffith as Prof. Whitaker
- Barton Yarborough as Coach Walsh
- Frank Faylen as Speed
- Marguerite Whitten as Malvina
- Paul Maxey as Bill Miller
- Tristram Coffin as Slugger Wilson
- Gene O'Donnell as Announcer
- Jackie Moran's Band as Orchestra
- Marvin Jones as Homer (uncredited)

== Soundtrack ==
- Gale Storm - "Look What You've Done to Me"
- Jackie Moran, Marcia Mae Jones, Mantan Moreland, and Marguerite Whitten - "Let's Do a Little Dreamin'"
- Gale Storm - "Sweet Sixteen"

== Reception ==
Let's Go Collegiate received unusually good notices when first released. Motion Picture Herald raved, "This comedy with music, produced on a budget which wouldn't get the camera started on a so-called major lot, outstrips [most B pictures] in point of freshness, spirit, liveliness, humor, and the essentials of entertainment generally... Millions have been spent on less worthwhile college plots with a fraction of the results obtained with this one."

== Bibliography ==
- Fetrow, Alan G. Feature Films, 1940-1949: a United States Filmography. McFarland, 1994.
