= Shanghai Chest =

1948 film by William Beaudine

- Shanghai Chest poster
- Directed by: William Beaudine
- Written by: Earl Derr Biggers (character); Samuel Newman (original story); Samuel Newman; W. Scott Darling (screenplay)
- Produced by: James S. Burkett
- Starring: see below
- Cinematography: William A. Sickner
- Edited by: Ace Herman
- Music by: Edward J. Kay
- Production company: Monogram Pictures
- Distributed by: Monogram Pictures
- Release date: 1948
- Running time: 65 minutes
- Country: United States
- Language: English

Shanghai Chest is a 1948 American mystery film directed by William Beaudine and featuring Roland Winters in his third appearance as Charlie Chan.

== Plot ==
As Victor Armstrong visits his uncle, Judge Wesley Armstrong, in San Francisco, he is knocked unconscious by an unknown attacker. When he wakes up, Victor finds out that his uncle has been stabbed to death. The judge's private secretary, Phyllis Powers, finds the two men and calls the police to the scene. When Victor wakes up he has the knife that stabbed his uncle in his hand.

In another part of the city, Tommy Chan and his chauffeur Birmingham, discover a man trying to burglar his way into a house as they are walking home from the movies. They make a citizens arrest of the man, who turns out to be the house owner, district attorney Frank Bronson, trying to climb in through the window. Tommy, who is the son of private detective Charlie Chan, and his chauffeur are put in jail because of their unlawful action.

Bronson is head of investigating the judge's murder, and hears from the judge's butler, Bates, that Victor wasn't allowed into the judge's home, and had to climb in through the window in the same way Bronson did. In an interview with the police, Phyllis also tells them that Victor, who is her boyfriend, argued with the judge about the purchase Victor had made of some stock worth $30,000.

Phyliis also heard how the judge contacted his lawyer Ed Seward and asked for a meet the following day, in order to update his will, to exclude Victor. This information gives Victor the most plausible motive for murdering the judge.

Famous detective Chan visits Bronson, his old acquaintance, to apologize for his son and Birmingham and their behavior the other night. At his visit, Chan overhears that two sets of fingerprints were found on the knife used to kill the judge; one set belonging to Victor and one to hardened criminal Tony Pindello.

Chan happens to know that Pindello was executed for another murder at San Quentin six months earlier. Pindello got his death sentence from Judge Armstrong. Chan is then asked by police investigator Ruark to help the police out on the case.

When district attorney Bronson is shot and killed soon after, Pindello's fingerprints are again found on the scene, on Bronson's desk. While investigating the case at judge Armstrong's office, Chan and Ruark catch the judge's clerk Walter Somervale looking through the judge's files.

The two men also find out that Seward, the judge's attorney, defended Pindello in the trial which ultimately sent him to the electric chair. From the judge's documents they find that Seward is also working on a commission against racketeering.

A letter addressed to Victor, to be opened in case the judge died, states that the judge had found evidence that Pindello may have been innocent of the murder for which he was convicted, and that Bronson was to be informed of this.

Chan and Ruark go to find Tony's buried body, but finds his coffin has been dug up and removed. Fearing that Pindello's murder trial is connected to the judge's murder and racketeering, Chan sees to it that all the jurors involved in the ruling are taken into protective custody for the time being. They locate everyone but one, Thomas Cartwright, who is attacked in his home and killed before the policemen get there. Pindello's fingerprints are once again found on the murder scene.

Chan looks into the fingerprints and learns that it is in fact possible to forge someone else's prints. He gathers Phyllis, Victor and Seward at the judge's home to confront them about the fake fingerprints.

When all are gathered in the judge's study, the power is cut and everything turns dark. They are locked in by an unknown man holding a gun, but manage to break out again, and find all documents related to the racketeering, insurance fraud and Pindello gone.

Chan discovers that Pindello has a brother, Joseph, who got a letter from Tony when he was in jail, saying he was about to be sentenced to death for a murder he didn't commit. Chan tells everyone that Joseph, to revenge his brother, was planning on killing everyone involved in the wrong sentencing of his brother, and dug up his brother's coffin.

While Chan explains this, Joseph enters the room with a gun and explains that his real purpose for digging up the coffin was simply to give his brother a proper burial. Joseph is then overpowered by Seward, who grabs Joseph's gun.

Chan goes on to explain the real murderer is Seward, because he was involved in an insurance scam with Pindello and wanted all the money for himself, thus framing Pindello for a murder to get rid of him.

Seward, sure to get away now that he has a gun, explains how he copied Pindello's prints to lead the police on a false trail. Chan tells Seward that the gun isn't loaded, since he gave it to Joseph earlier, and that it was all part of a set-up. Seward tries to flee but is stopped by Birmingham and arrested.

== Cast ==
- Roland Winters as Charlie Chan
- Victor Sen Yung as Tommy Chan
- Mantan Moreland as Birmingham Brown
- Russell Hicks as Dist. Atty. Frank Bronson
- Tim Ryan as Lt. Mike Ruark
- Pierre Watkin as Judge Wesley Armstrong
- John Alvin as Victor Armstrong, nephew of Judge Armstrong
- Deannie Best as Phyllis Powers, Judge Armstrong's secretary
- Tristram Coffin as Edward Seward, Judge Armstrong's lawyer
- Milton Parsons as Mr. Grail, undertaker
- Dimples Cooper (Elizabeth Cooper) as Miss Lee - Receptionist (uncredited)
