= The Golden Eye =

1948 film by William Beaudine

- Directed by: William Beaudine
- Written by: Earl Derr Biggers (characters); Scott Darling
- Produced by: James S. Burkett
- Starring: Roland Winters
- Cinematography: William A. Sickner
- Edited by: Ace Herman
- Music by: Edward J. Kay
- Production company: Monogram Pictures
- Distributed by: Monogram Pictures
- Release date: August 29, 1948
- Running time: 69 minutes
- Country: United States
- Language: English

The Golden Eye

The Golden Eye is a 1948 American film directed by William Beaudine and starring Roland Winters in his fourth appearance as Charlie Chan. The working title was The Mystery of the Golden Eye.

== Plot ==
Mr. Manning, owner of the Golden Eye Mine in Arizona, persuades Charlie Chan to help him. To avoid alerting Manning's murderous enemies, Chan registers as a guest at a nearby dude ranch along with his number two son, Tommy, and his black chauffeur, Birmingham Brown. There he meets San Francisco police lieutenant Mike Ruark, posing as drunken fellow guest "Vincent O'Brien" to investigate why the mine has suddenly become valuable.

When Chan goes to see Manning, he finds that he has supposedly fallen down a mineshaft, leaving him in a coma. While there, he is recognized by assayer Talbot Bartlett, who knows him from a previous case.

Later, Chan guesses that prospector Pete is stealing ore from the mine. Pete agrees to guide Chan, Tommy, and Birmingham to the mine through his secret passageway. However, when they arrive, Tommy and Birmingham find Pete's body. Chan eventually surmises that much cheaper Mexican gold is being smuggled into the United States and sold at a huge profit. The detective exposes the ringleader and his confederates.

== Cast ==
- Roland Winters as Charlie Chan
- Victor Sen Yung as Tommy Chan
- Mantan Moreland as Birmingham Brown
- Wanda McKay as Evelyn Manning
- Bruce Kellogg as Talbot Bartlett
- Tim Ryan as Lt. Mike Ruark, alias "Vincent O'Brien"
- Evelyn Brent as Sister Teresa
- Ralph Dunn as Jim Driscoll, superintendent of the Golden Eye
- Lois Austin as Mrs. Margaret Driscoll
- Forrest Taylor as Mr. Manning
- Lee 'Lasses' White as Pete
- Lee Tung Foo as Wong Fai, owner of a curio shop (uncredited)

== Production ==
The film was made in seven days.

== Reception ==
The Exhibitor gave The Golden Eye good marks: "This entry in the Charlie Chan series has a western setting, and what with mystery, murder, and gold smuggling combined, it makes for one of the better episodes in the Oriental sleuth's cinematic career. Mantan Moreland provides his usual effective type of comedy relief." On the other hand, trade publisher Pete Harrison disliked the mixture of the various story elements, and graded the film "no better and no worse than the others in the series. Those who are the least bit discriminating will probably find it pretty tiring, for the far-fetched story winds its way through a maze of so many clues that not even a mastermind will have the patience to figure it out."

== Copyright status ==
While some presume the film to be in the public domain, due to the omission of a valid copyright notice on original-release prints, The Golden Eye was indeed registered for copyright by Monogram Pictures on August 22, 1948 (certificate number LP1857).
