= Keye Luke =

Chinese-born American actor (1904–1991)

- 陸錫麒
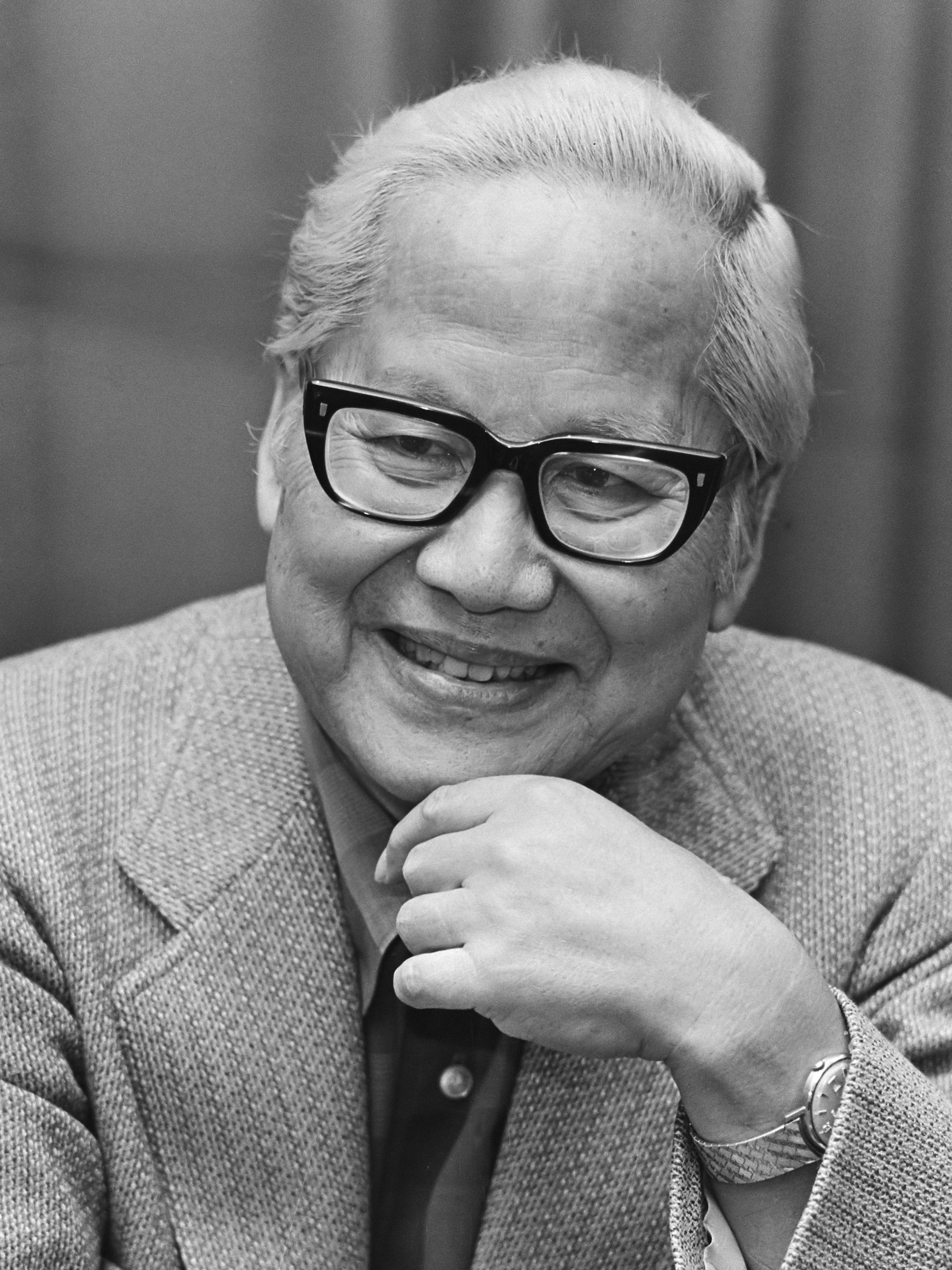
- Luke in 1976
- Born: June 18, 1904; Guangzhou, Guangdong, China
- Died: January 12, 1991 (aged 86); Whittier, California, U.S.
- Resting place: Rose Hills Memorial Park in Whittier
- Occupations: Actor, artist
- Years active: 1934–1990
- Spouse: Ethel Davis (m. 1942; died 1979)
- Children: 1
- Relatives: Edwin Luke (brother); Wing Luke (cousin)

Signature (Chinese)

Chinese name
- Traditional Chinese: 陸錫麒
- Simplified Chinese: 陆锡麒
Transcriptions
Standard Mandarin
- Hanyu Pinyin: Lù Xīqí
Yue: Cantonese
- Jyutping: Luk^{6} Sek^{3}kei^{4}

Signature
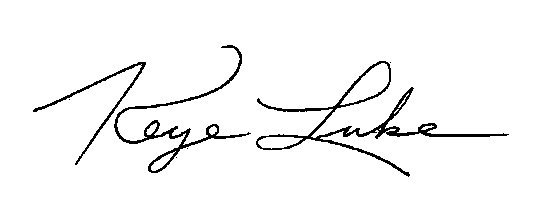

Keye Luke (Chinese: 陸錫麒; pinyin: Lù Xīqí; Jyutping: Luk^{6} Sek^{3}kei^{4}; June 18, 1904 – January 12, 1991) was a Chinese-born American actor and visual artist. He was the first Chinese-American contract player signed by RKO, Universal Pictures, 20th Century-Fox and Metro-Goldwyn-Mayer; a founding member of the Screen Actors Guild, and was one of the most prominent Asian actors of American cinema in the mid-20th century.

Luke notably portrayed Lee Chan, the "Number One Son" in the Charlie Chan films, the original Kato in the Green Hornet film serials (1939–41), the voice of Brak on the animated television series Space Ghost cartoons (1966–67), Kwai Chang Caine's mentor Master Po on the television series Kung Fu (1972–75), and Mr. Wing in the Gremlins (1984) and its sequel Gremlins 2: The New Batch (1990).

== Early life ==
Luke was born in Canton (Guangzhou) in 1904, during the Qing dynasty. His father, Lee Luke, was a second-generation Chinese American born in San Francisco in 1880. His mother, Down Cook, was from Guangzhou. Luke's parents met while his father was on one of several trips to China. When he was still a young child, he and his family moved back to the United States, settling in Seattle, Washington. Luke was raised in Seattle Chinatown, where Luke's father established an art/import shop in Seattle Chinatown.

In Seattle, Luke attended Franklin High School, where he contributed cartoons and illustrations to school publications. He attended the University of Washington for a brief time, studying engineering. He became a naturalized citizen of the United States in 1944.

Luke had four siblings who all moved from Seattle to California during the Great Depression. His younger brother Edwin Luke also became an actor in the Charlie Chan series. The Luke family includes Washington assistant attorney-general Wing Luke.

== Career ==
=== Artist ===
Before becoming an actor, he was an artist in Seattle and, later, Hollywood. Luke worked on several of the murals inside Grauman's Chinese Theatre. He did some of the original artwork for the pressbook of the original King Kong (1933). Luke also painted a mural for the casino set in The Shanghai Gesture (1941).

He published a limited edition set of pen and ink drawings of the Rubaiyat of Omar Khayyam in the 1950s. He also created illustrations for the books The Unfinished Song of Achmed Mohammed by Earle Liederman, Blessed Mother Goose by Frank Scully and an edition of Messer Marco Polo by Brian Oswald Donn-Byrne (unpublished). Other artwork completed by Luke included the dust jackets for books published in the 1950s and 1960s. It was through his studio art work that he was recruited for his earliest movie roles.

=== Acting ===
Luke made his film debut for Metro-Goldwyn-Mayer in The Painted Veil (1934), and played his first major role, as Charlie Chan's eldest son, Lee Chan (called "Number One Son" by his father) in Charlie Chan in Paris (1935). He became a regular in the series, where Lee Chan alternately helped and distracted his father in each of his murder cases. Lee Chan is culturally American and was an Olympic Gold Medalist in 100-metre swimming in Charlie Chan at the Olympics (1937). Luke appeared seven times as Lee Chan opposite Warner Oland's Charlie Chan. He left the Charlie Chan series in 1938, shortly after Oland died. The unfinished Oland-Luke film Charlie Chan at the Ringside was completed as Mr. Moto's Gamble (1938), with Luke now opposite Peter Lorre.

Luke worked prolifically with several Hollywood studios. Metro-Goldwyn-Mayer cast him in a recurring role in its Dr. Kildare film series, and Monogram Pictures featured him in its Frankie Darro comedies and starred him as Mr. Wong in Phantom of Chinatown. Unlike Boris Karloff, who preceded him in the Mr. Wong role, Luke played the detective without any exotic touches. His Mr. Wong, of Chinese descent and able to speak Chinese, was otherwise an ordinary American detective with no trace of a foreign accent.

RKO Radio Pictures used Luke in its The Falcon series and Mexican Spitfire. Luke also worked at Universal Pictures, where he played the valet/chauffeur Kato, the title character's sidekick in its Green Hornet serials. Universal mounted a low-budget serial consisting largely of action footage from older films; Luke was hired to match old footage of Sabu in the serial Lost City of the Jungle (1946).

Luke returned to the Chan mysteries, which were then being produced by Monogram and starred Roland Winters as Chan. "Number One Son" appeared in the last two Chan features, The Feathered Serpent (1948), along with "Number Two Son" Tommy Chan (Victor Sen Yung) in their only appearance together, and Sky Dragon (1949). In both of these films, Luke was older than the actor playing his father. Luke had a featured Broadway role in the Rodgers and Hammerstein musical Flower Drum Song, directed by Gene Kelly in 1958. In the original cast album he sang the part of Mr. Wang, the family patriarch.

Luke continued to play character parts in motion pictures. He had a featured role in The Chairman (1969) starring Gregory Peck. He dubbed the voice of the evil Mr. Han (played by Shih Kien) in Enter the Dragon (1973) starring Bruce Lee. Luke played the mysterious old Chinatown shopowner Mr. Wing in the two Gremlins movies and he had a significant role in Woody Allen's movie Alice (1990).

Luke also worked extensively in television, making numerous guest appearances, including four on The F.B.I. and seven TV movies. He was a regular cast member in two short lived sitcoms, Anna and the King (1972) starring Yul Brynner and Sidekicks (TV 1986–87). He appeared as Lin Fong (a jade merchant) in an episode of Dragnet 1967.

In 1972, he played the voice of Charlie Chan, in the animated television series The Amazing Chan and the Chan Clan (1972–73), becoming the first actor of Chinese descent to play the role. He voiced other animated characters including Brak in Space Ghost (1966-68) and Zoltar/The Great Spirit/Colonel Cronus in Battle of the Planets (1978-80).

Luke played Master Po in the television series Kung Fu (1972–75). In 1985, Luke appeared as "The Ancient One" in the ABC soap opera General Hospital, for the Asian Quarter storyline, which showcased Luke and young actress Kimberly McCullough, whom he mentored. In 1986 Luke appeared in season two of The Golden Girls as Sophia's love interest. He played two separate roles in the sitcom Night Court, first as a defendant and later as Mac Robinson's grandfather-in-law.

Luke played Governor Donald Cory in episode 71 of the original Star Trek entitled "Whom Gods Destroy" (1969), and was originally cast as Doctor Noonien Soong in the Star Trek: The Next Generation episode "Brothers"; Brent Spiner ultimately took over the role after Luke became ill.

In the Fractured Fairy Tales episode "The Enchanted Fly," one of the rewards offered to the man who would rescue and marry the princess is "an autographed picture of Keye Luke."

== Honors ==
Luke was awarded the Lifetime Achievement Award by Asian/Pacific American Artists in 1986. For his contribution to show business, he was also honored with a star on the Hollywood Walk of Fame, on the sidewalk in front of 7000 Hollywood Blvd.

== Personal life ==
Luke married his wife Ethel Davis in 1942, who predeceased him in 1979. They had one child.

=== Death ===
Luke died of a stroke on January 12, 1991, at the age of 86. He is buried at Rose Hills Memorial Park in Whittier, California.

== Legacy ==
Writer and filmmaker Timothy Tau wrote, directed and produced a short film about Keye Luke's earlier life and work, entitled Keye Luke, which premiered at the 2012 Los Angeles Asian Pacific Film Festival as a Visual Communications Armed with a Camera Fellowship film. The film was also the Closing Night choice of the inaugural 2013 Seattle Asian American Film Festival. Feodor Chin starred as Keye Luke. Archie Kao starred as Edwin Luke, Keye Luke's brother. Kelvin Han Yee starred as Lee Luke, Keye Luke's father.

== Filmography ==
=== Film ===
- The Painted Veil (1934) as Shay Key Fong (uncredited)
- Charlie Chan in Paris (1935) as Lee Chan
- The Casino Murder Case (1935) as Taki - Casino Pageboy (uncredited)
- Eight Bells (1935) as Interpreter (uncredited)
- Murder in the Fleet (1935) as Consul's Secretary (uncredited)
- Oil for the Lamps of China (1935) as Chinese soldier
- Mad Love (1935) as Dr. Wong
- Shanghai (1935) as Chinese Ambassador's son
- Here's to Romance (1935) as Saito
- Charlie Chan in Shanghai (1935) as Lee Chan
- King of Burlesque (1936) Wong
- Anything Goes (1936) as Ching (uncredited)
- Charlie Chan at the Circus (1936) as Lee Chan
- Charlie Chan at the Race Track (1936) as Lee Chan
- Charlie Chan at the Opera (1936) as Lee Chan
- Between Two Women (1937) as Dr. Lee
- The Good Earth (1937) as Elder son
- Charlie Chan at the Olympics (1937) as Lee Chan
- Charlie Chan on Broadway (1937) as Lee Chan
- Charlie Chan at Monte Carlo (1937) as Lee Chan
- International Settlement (1938) as Dr. Wong
- Mr. Moto's Gamble (1938) as Lee Chan
- North of Shanghai (1939) as Jimmy Riley
- Disputed Passage (1939) as Andrew Abbott
- Sued for Libel (1939) as Chang Howe
- Barricade (1939) as Ling - Cady's secretary
- The Green Hornet (1940, serial) as Kato
- Wildcat Bus (1940) as Tai (uncredited)
- Phantom of Chinatown (1940) as James Lee Wong
- Comrade X (1940) as World Press Attendee with Glasses (uncredited)
- No, No, Nanette (1940) as Sung, Oriental Cafe Manager (uncredited)
- The Green Hornet Strikes Again! (1940, Serial) as Kato
- Footlight Fever (1941) as Chinese Restaurant Waiter (uncredited)
- The Gang's All Here (1941) as George Lee
- They Met in Bombay (1941) as Mr. Toy (scenes deleted)
- Bowery Blitzkrieg (1941) as Clancy (as Key Luke)
- Passage from Hong Kong (1941) as Charlie, Chinese Waiter (uncredited)
- Let's Go Collegiate (1941) as Buck Wing
- Burma Convoy (1941) as Lin Taiyen
- No Hands on the Clock (1941) as Severino (uncredited)
- North to the Klondike (1942) as K. Wellington Wong
- Mr. and Mrs. North (1942) as Kumi
- A Yank on the Burma Road (1942) as Kim How
- A Tragedy at Midnight (1942) as Ah Foo
- Spy Ship (1942) as Koshimo Haru
- Submarine Raider (1942) as Tesei (uncredited)
- Invisible Agent (1942) as Surgeon
- Somewhere I'll Find You (1942) as Thomas Chang (uncredited)
- Across the Pacific (1942) as Steamship Office Clerk
- Mexican Spitfire's Elephant (1942) as Lao Lee - Chinese Magician (uncredited)
- The Falcon's Brother (1942) as Jerry - Gay's Houseboy
- Destination Unknown (1942) as Secretary
- Dr. Gillespie's New Assistant (1942) as Dr. Lee Wong Howe
- Journey for Margaret (1942) as Japanese Statesman (uncredited)
- The Adventures of Smilin' Jack (1943, Serial) as Capt. Wing
- Dr. Gillespie's Criminal Case (1943) as Dr. Lee Wong Howe
- Salute to the Marines (1943) as Flashy Logaz
- Andy Hardy's Blonde Trouble (1944) as Dr. Lee Wong Howe
- Three Men in White (1944) as Dr. Lee Wong Howe
- Dragon Seed (1944)
- Between Two Women (1945) as Dr. Lee Wong Howe
- Secret Agent X-9 (1945, Serial) as Ah Fong
- First Yank into Tokyo (1945) as Haan Soo
- How Doooo You Do!!! (1945) as Chinese Detective
- Tokyo Rose (1946) as Charlie Otani
- Lost City of the Jungle (1946, Serial) as Tal Shan
- Dark Delusion (1947) as Dr. Lee Wong Howe
- Sleep, My Love (1948) as Jimmie Lin
- Waterfront at Midnight (1948) as Loy
- The Feathered Serpent (1948) as Lee Chan
- Sky Dragon (1949) as Lee Chan
- Manhandled (1949) as Chinese Laundry Owner (uncredited)
- Young Man with a Horn (1950) as Ramundo the Houseboy (uncredited)
- Macao (1952) (uncredited)
- The Congregation (1952)
- Hong Kong (1952) as Taxicab Driver (uncredited)
- Fair Wind to Java (1953) as Pidada
- South Sea Woman (1953) as Japanese Deck Officer (uncredited)
- World for Ransom (1954) as Wong
- Hell's Half Acre (1954) as Police Chief Dan
- The Bamboo Prison (1954) as Comrade-Instructor Li Ching
- Godzilla Raids Again (1955) as Shoichi Tsukioka (English version, voice, uncredited)
- Love is a Many-Splendored Thing (1955) as Lee Foo (uncredited)
- Around the World in 80 Days (1956) as old man at Yokohama travel office (uncredited)
- Rodan (1956) as Narrator (English version, voice, uncredited)
- Yangtse Incident: The Story of H.M.S. Amethyst (1957) as Capt. Kuo Tai
- Gigantis the Fire Monster (1959) as VA for Shoichi Tsukioka (uncredited)
- Nobody's Perfect (1968) as Gondai-San
- Project X (1968) as Sen Chiu (as Key Luke)
- The Chairman (1969) as Prof. Soong Li
- Noon Sunday (1970) as Colonel Oong
- The Hawaiians (1970) as Foo Sen
- Won Ton Ton, the Dog Who Saved Hollywood (1976) as Cook in kitchen
- The Amsterdam Kill (1977) as Chung Wei
- Just You and Me, Kid (1979) as Dr. Device
- Wonders of China at Walt Disney World's EPCOT Center (1982) as philosopher Li Bai
- Gremlins (1984) as Mr. Wing
- A Fine Mess (1986) as Ishimine
- Dead Heat (1988) as Mr. Thule
- The Mighty Quinn (1989) as Dr. Raj
- Gremlins 2: The New Batch (1990) as Mr. Wing
- Alice (1990) as Dr. Yang

=== Television ===
- Mysteries of Chinatown 1 episode (Shadow of the Avenger) (1950)
- The Stu Erwin Show 1 episode (Lin Yang in What Paper Do You Read?) (1951)
- Schlitz Playhouse 1 episode (Souvenir from Singapore) (1952)
- Chevron Theatre 1 episode (One Thing Leads to Another) (1952)
- Your Jeweler's Showcase 1 episode (Juice Man) (1952)
- Terry and the Pirates 3 episodes (Okura in Macao Gold) (1952) (Lt. Leong in The Green God) (1953) (Police Captain in Compound 3-C Theft) (1953)
- Biff Baker, U.S.A. 1 episode (Tom Ling in The Hawaii Story) (1953)
- Fireside Theatre 2 episodes (The Traitor) (1953) (The Reign of Amelika Joe) (1954)
- The New Adventures of China Smith 4 episodes (Aban in The Sign of the Scorpion) (Tony Wan in The Talons of Tongking) (Wong in Plane to Tainan) (The Proverbs of Shen-Tze) (1954)
- Studio 57 1 episode (Sam Kee in Ring Once for Death) (1954)
- December Bride 1 episode (Waiter in The Chinese Dinner) (1954)
- The Ray Milland Show 1 episode (Professor Wong in Chinese Luck) (1954)
- My Little Margie 1 episode (Mr. Chang/Fake Mr. Lee in San Francisco Story) (1954)
- Cavalcade of America (Ordeal in Burma) (1954) (Call Home the Heart) (1956)
- Big Town 1 episode (The Sniper) (1955)
- Annie Oakley 1 episode (Li Wong in Annie and the Chinese Puzzle) (1955)
- Soldiers of Fortune 1 episode (Captain Kopan in Jungle Rebel) (1955)
- The Lineup 1 episode (The Chinatown Case) (1955)
- Gunsmoke 1 episode (Chen in The Queue) (1955)
- Crusader 1 episode (Lin Suchow in Christmas in Burma) (1955)
- Crossroads 2 episodes (Leang Fan in Calvary in China) (1956) (Wang-Red Soldier in The Inner Light) (1956)
- Jungle Jim 1 episode (Jolong in Power of Darkness) (1956)
- Buffalo Bill, Jr. 1 episode (The Golden Plant) (1956)
- Telephone Time 1 episode (Time Bomb) (1956)
- TV Reader's Digest 1 episode (Mr. Ling in The Smuggler) (1956)
- The Adventures of Dr. Fu Manchu 1 episode (Lum Sen in The Golden God of Dr. Fu Manchu) (1956)
- Wire Service 1 episode (Young General in No Peace in Lo Dao) (1957)
- Panic! 1 episode (Honolulu in Mayday) (1957)
- Climax! 1 episode (Chen in Jacob and the Angel) (1957)
- The Gale Storm Show 2 episodes (Chong in Singapore Fling) (1957) (Henry Ling in The Case of the Chinese Puzzle) (1958)
- Alcoa Theatre 1 episode (Mike in In the Dark) (1958)
- The Californians 1 episode (China Doll) (1958)
- Mike Hammer 1 episode (Sammy Wong in So That's Who It Was) (1958)
- Richard Diamond, Private Detective 1 episode (Dr. Lin Chang in Chinese Honeymoon) (1958)
- Trackdown 1 episode (Wong in Chinese Cowboy) (1958)
- The Case of the Dangerous Robin 1 episode (The China Passage) (1961)
- Follow the Sun 1 episode (Sumarit in Little Girl Lost) (1961)
- Target: The Corruptors 1 episode (Chang Sui in Chase the Dragon) (1962)
- Fair Exchange 1 episode (Mr. Fong in The Exchange) (1962)
- Perry Mason 2 episodes (C.C. Chang in The Case of the Weary Watchdog) (1962) (Choy in The Case of the Feather Cloak) (1965)
- The Littlest Hobo 1 episode (Wu Chang in Chinese Puzzle) (1963)
- Mickey 1 episode (Grandpa Kwan in The Way the Fortune Cookie Crumbles)(1964)
- Kentucky Jones 2 episodes (Thomas Wong in Ike's Song (1964) and My Old Kwantungy Home (1965))
- Jonny Quest (animated) 2 episodes (voice) (Commissioner Wah/Panel truck passenger/Sentry-post 4 in The Quetong Missile Mystery) (1965) (Charlie in The Sea Haunt) (1965)
- I Spy 1 episode (Lt. How in Danny Was a Million Laughs) (1965)
- The Wackiest Ship in the Army 1 episode (Last Path to Garcia) (1965)
- My Brother the Angel 1 episode (Mr. Togosaki in The Hawaiian Caper) (1966)
- Bob Hope Presents the Chrysler Theatre 1 episode (Han in Wind Fever) (1966)
- Space Ghost (animated) 3 episodes (voice) (Brak in The Lure (1966), The Looters (1967), and The Two Faces of Doom (1967))
- The Green Hornet 1 episode (Mr. Chang in The Preying Mantis) (uncredited) (1966)
- The F.B.I. 4 episodes (General How in The Spy-Master) (1966) (Ken Torii in The Hiding Place) (1966) (Captain Cheiu in The Courier) (1967) (Mr. Seito in Memory of a Legend) (1973)
- Coronet Blue 1 episode (Yasito Omaki in Tomoyo) (1967)
- The Andy Griffith Show 1 episode (Charlie Lee in Aunt Bee's Restaurant) (1966)
- Family Affair 1 episode (Grandfather Chang in The Great Kow-Tow) (1967)
- Dragnet 2 episodes (The Jade Story) (1967) (The Big Amateur) (1968)
- The Big Valley 1 episode (Mike Chang in The Emperor of Rice) (1968)
- The Outsider 1 episode (Won Ah-Kam in Cold as Ashes) (1968)
- It Takes a Thief 2 episodes (Dubek in When Good Friends Get Together) (1968) (Dr. Tanu Woo in Project X) (1970)
- Star Trek: The Original Series S3:E14 (Donald Cory in Whom Gods Destroy) (1969)
- Hawaii Five-O 1 episode (Senator John Oishi in All the King's Horses) (1969)
- Marcus Welby, M.D. 2 episodes (Dr. George Braley in A Woman's Place) (1971) (David Yen in A Portrait of Debbie) (1971)
- Adam-12 2 episodes (George Lum in Log 56: Vice Versa) (1971) (Sing Hong in Mary Hong Loves Tommy Chen) (1972)
- Here's Lucy 1 episode (Quon Fong in Lucy and the Chinese Curse) (1972)
- The Amazing Chan and the Chan Clan (1972) (animated) 14 episodes (voice) (Charlie Chan)
- Anna and the King 13 episodes (Kralahome) (1972)
- Kung Fu 46 episodes (Master Po) (1972-1975)
- The Cat Creature TV movie (The Thief-Joe Sung) (1973)
- Love, American Style 1 episode segment (Hi Ching in Love and the Golden Worm) (1973)
- Judgement: The Court Martial of the Tiger of Malaya-General Yamashita TV movie (1974)
- Judge Dee and the Monastery Murders TV movie (Lord Sun Ming) (1974)
- Cannon 2 episodes (Sam in Where's Jennifer?) (1974) (Lu Chin in The Melted Man) (1975)
- Harry-O 1 episode (Dr. Creighton Fong in The Mysterious Case of Lester and Dr. Fong) (1976)
- Hunter 1 episode (The Back-Up) (Never broadcast)
- Quincy M.E. 1 episode (Hitoshi Hiyato in Touch of Death) (1977)
- Battle of the Planets (animated) 85 episodes (voice) (Zoltar/The Great Spirit/Colonel Cronus) (1978-1980)
- M*A*S*H 3 episodes (Mr. Shin in Patent 4077) (1978) (Cho Kim in A Night at Rosie's) (1979) (headmaster in Death Takes a Holiday) (1980)
- Vega$ 1 episode (Henry Matsimura in Death Mountain) (1979)
- Scooby-Doo and Scrappy-Doo (animated) unknown episode(s) (voices) (1979-1983)
- How the West Was Won 1 episode (Leong Chung Hua in China Girl) (1979)
- Thundarr the Barbarian (animated) 2 episodes (voice) (Additional voices in Secret of the Black Pearl) (1980) (Zevon in The Brotherhood of Night) (1980)
- Charlie's Angels 1 episode (Lin in Island Angels) (1980)
- Fly Away Home TV movie (Duc) (1981)
- Spider-Man and His Amazing Friends (animated) 1 episode (voice) (Genju in Sunfire) (1981)
- Bret Maverick 1 episode (Lu Sung in The Yellow Rose) (1981)
- Remington Steele 1 episode (Tanaka in Your Steele the One for Me) (1982)
- Voyagers! 1 episode (Kublai Khan in The Travels of Marco...and Friends) (1982)
- Cocaine and Blue Eyes TV movie (Tan Ng) (1983)
- Magnum P.I. 1 episode (Goto in Forty Years from Sand Island) (1983)
- Falcon Crest 2 episodes (Wilson Fong in Separate Hearts and Maelstrom) (1983)
- Faerie Tale Theatre 1 episode (Imperial Doctor in The Nightingale) (1983)
- Mister T (animated) unknown episode(s) (voice) (1983)
- Alvin and the Chipmunks (animated) 13 episodes (voice) (1983)
- The A-Team 1 episode (Sam Yeng in The Maltese Cow) (1984)
- The New Mike Hammer 1 episode (Sun Woo in Hot Ice) (1984)
- Trapper John, M.D. 1 episode (Ronald Kwan Mein in Eternally Yours) (1984)
- Miami Vice 1 episode (Lao Li in Golden Triangle (Part II)) (1985)
- Street Hawk 1 episode (Mr. Ming in Chinatown Memories) (1985)
- Blade in Hong Kong TV movie (1985)
- Crazy Like a Fox 1 episode (Requiem for a Fox) (1985)
- Jem 1 episode (voice) (Battle of the Bands) (1985)
- MacGyver 2 episodes (Prasert in Episode 1.2 "The Golden Triangle") (1985) (Adam Chen in Murderers' Sky) (1988)
- General Hospital (The Ancient One in Asian Quarter) (1985)
- Kung Fu: The Movie (TV movie) (Master Po) (1986)
- T.J. Hooker 1 episode (Dr. Kenji Yakimura in Blood Sport) (1986)
- The Golden Girls 1 episode (Toshiro Mitsumo in Vacation) (1986)
- The New Adventures of Jonny Quest (animated) unknown episode(s) (voices) (1986/87)
- Sidekicks 13 episodes (Sabasan) (1986-87)
- Night Court 2 episodes (Grandfather Ho in The Apartment) (1986) (Mr. Shibata in Mac's Dilemma) (1987)
- Beauty and the Beast 1 episode (Master in China Moon) (1988)
- Friday the 13th: The Series 1 episode (Lum Chen in Tattoo) (1988)
- Superboy 1 episode (Sensei in The Power of Evil) (1989)

== See also ==
Preceded by None	Actors portraying Brak; 1966-1968	Succeeded by C. Martin Croker
