= Shadows Over Chinatown =

- Directed by: Terry O. Morse
- Written by: Raymond L. Schrock; Ralph Bettinson (uncredited)
- Based on: Characters created by Earl Derr Biggers
- Produced by: James S. Burkett
- Starring: Sidney Toler; Victor Sen Yung; Mantan Moreland
- Cinematography: William A. Sickner
- Edited by: Ralph Dixon
- Music by: Edward J. Kay
- Production company: Monogram Pictures
- Distributed by: Monogram Pictures
- Release date: June 27, 1946
- Running time: 64 minutes
- Country: United States
- Language: English

Shadows Over Chinatown is a 1946 American mystery film directed by Terry O. Morse. The film stars Sidney Toler as Charlie Chan, and features Victor Sen Yung as Number Two Son Jimmy and Mantan Moreland as Chan's chauffeur.

== Plot ==
Late one night, Charlie Chan is shot at a San Francisco bus station. While on a missing-persons case, he investigates a series of sensational slayings—publicized as "the torso murders," in which only the victim's torso remains at the crime scene. Chan is assisted officially by detective Jeff Hay and police captain Allen, and unofficially by his Number Two Son Jimmy and chauffeur Birmingham Brown.

== Cast ==
- Sidney Toler as Charlie Chan
- Victor Sen Yung as Jimmy Chan
- Mantan Moreland as Birmingham Brown
- Tanis Chandler as Mary Conover, former employee of an escort service
- Mary Gordon as Mrs. Conover, Mary's grandmother
- Bruce Kellogg as Cpl. Joe Thomas, Mary's sweetheart
- Paul Bryar as Mike Rogan, Mary's former boss
- John Gallaudet as Jeff Hay, private investigator
- Alan Bridge as Capt. Allen
- George Eldredge as Chief Lanigan
- Jack Norton as Cosgrove, pickpocket
- Mira McKinney as Kate Johnson
- Dorothy Granger as Joan Mercer, escort-bureau receptionist
- Lou Mercelle as narrator

== Production ==
The working title was The Mandarin Secret. The Shadows Over Chinatown title had been coined in 1940 for Doomed to Die, one of Monogram's Mr. Wong mysteries, but discarded at that time. Doomed to Die was written by British author Ralph Bettinson, who had also written the 1939 British film The Torso Murder Mystery. The theme of The Torso Murder Mystery is reused in Shadows over Chinatown, although Bettinson receives no screen credit.

The 72-year-old Sidney Toler had been diagnosed with terminal cancer, but insisted on continuing his commitment to the film series. The studio accommodated him by granting him prolonged breaks, and staging the scenes so as not to tax his strength. According to Mantan Moreland, "Mr. Toler couldn't stand for very long and had to rest a lot. I told him he should be in a hospital. And he said to me, 'Manny, if I quit the picture I'll put all these people out of work.'" Toler is seated during much of the film, and the character being wounded spared the actor from extended movement. Although Toler remains the central actor, some of the action is diverted to Jimmy (Victor Sen Yung) and Birmingham (Mantan Moreland). To lengthen the running time of the film, a two-minute prologue was added, detailing the workings of a bureau of missing persons. None of the film's featured players appeared in this sequence.

== Reception ==
Trade publisher Pete Harrison noticed all the pains Monogram took to extend the film to feature length: "Although the picture runs only 64 minutes, considerable padding had to be done to give it that footage, which is an indication of how thin is the story." Tom Loy of Motion Picture Daily reported, "Sidney Toler pilots the police through the latest in his detective series with the usual skilled touch, both as a stylized actor and a mastermind, while Mantan Moreland and Victor Sen Young provide a satisfactory brand of witless comedy. The fans should respond." Variety called the picture "standard Charlie Chan fare. A slimly budgeted film, Shadows Over Chinatown is cooked up from the familiar recipe of Oriental epigrams and occasional corpses which have been the trademark of this series since the late Warner Oland first quoted Confucius. Plot originality in this one is negligible but dialoguing is snappy and film is well paced."

Shadows Over Chinatown became controversial when a small distributor, Nathan Saland of Mercury Film Laboratory in New York, filed an injunction against Monogram. Saland was then handling the 1937 Bela Lugosi-Herman Brix serial Shadow of Chinatown, and objected to what he considered the theft of his title. State Supreme Court judge Edward R. Koch found in favor of Saland, ruling that Monogram's title constituted an "active invasion of the plaintiff's rights," and awarded damages, to be computed by a neutral referee from Monogram's gross and profits from Shadows Over Chinatown.
