= She's Too Mean for Me =

Comedy film

She's Too Mean for Me is a 1948 American film starring comedian Mantan Moreland. It was one of two Goldmax productions. It is a comedy. In the movie, the character portraying Moreland's on-screen wife is after him in the film. It and Come On, Cowboy! were the last two films Ted Toddy produced. Irving Hartley was the cinematographer.

It was marketed as having an all-star colored cast. Ted Toddy's Toddy Pictures distributed the film. A poster for the film is extant.

== Cast ==
- Mantan Moreland
- F. E. Miller
- Johnny Lee
