= Footlight Fever =

1941 film

- Theatrical release poster
- Directed by: Irving Reis
- Screenplay by: Bert Granet; Ian McLellan Hunter
- Produced by: Howard Benedict
- Starring: Alan Mowbray; Donald MacBride; Elisabeth Risdon; Lee Bonnell; Elyse Knox; Charles Quigley
- Cinematography: Robert De Grasse
- Edited by: Theron Warth
- Production company: RKO Radio Pictures
- Distributed by: RKO Radio Pictures
- Release date: March 21, 1941 (USA)
- Running time: 69 minutes
- Country: United States
- Language: English

Footlight Fever is a 1941 American comedy film directed by Irving Reis and starring Alan Mowbray, Donald MacBride, Elisabeth Risdon and Elyse Knox. Produced and distributed by RKO Pictures, it is a sequel to the 1940 film Curtain Call.

== Plot ==
Theatrical producers Donald Avery and Geoffrey "Jeff" Crandall try to con a millionairess into funding their latest show by posing as old friends of her lost love.

== Cast ==
- Alan Mowbray as Donald Avery
- Donald MacBride as Geoffrey "Jeff" Crandall
- Elisabeth Risdon as Hattie Drake
- Lee Bonnell as John Carter
- Elyse Knox as Eileen Drake
- Charles Quigley as Spike
- Georgia Backus as Imogene
- Eddie Borden as Joe
- Chester Clute as Mr. Holly
- Charles Halton as Mr. E.J. Fingernogle
- Lew Kelly as Jarvis
- Mantan Moreland as Willie Hamsure
- Bradley Page as Harvey Parker
- Keye Luke as Waiter

== Reception ==
It lost $40,000 at the box office. A reviewer in Variety felt the film was predictable as "there's not an unexpected moment in it".

== Bibliography ==
- Tucker, David C. Gale Storm: A Biography and Career Record. McFarland, 2018.
