= Edwin Luke =

American actor

- Born: Edwin Sylvester Luke; July 23, 1911; Seattle, Washington, U.S.
- Died: January 18, 1986 (aged 74); Los Angeles, California, U.S.
- Education: University of Washington
- Occupation(s): Actor, journalist, typographer, social worker
- Spouse: Sun Lin “Lennie” Wong (1914–1986)
- Relatives: Keye Luke (brother)

Edwin Sylvester Luke (July 23, 1911 – January 18, 1986) was a Chinese American character actor who had a career in Hollywood during the 1940s and 1950s. He played Charlie Chan's Number Four Son, Eddie Chan, in the 1945 feature "The Jade Mask", starring Sydney Toler. He was the son of first generation Chinese American Lee Luke (born in San Francisco in 1880) and the younger brother of actor Keye Luke. He was one of three Chinese Americans - the first cohort - to receive a bachelor's degree in journalism from the University of Washington in 1936. While a student there, he played on the championship team in the Northwest Chinese Basketball Tournament. Subsequently, he was the first Chinese American member of the International Typographical Union (Los Angeles #174) in 1941. In addition to acting, he also worked for The Hollywood Reporter as a typographer, writer, editor and later forged a successful career as a social worker for Los Angeles County. In the 2012 award winning short film "Keye Luke", by Taiwanese-American Director Timothy Tau, Edwin Luke was portrayed by actor Archie Kao.

== Filmography ==
Year	Title	Role	Notes
1945	The Jade Mask	Eddie Chan	
1945	Secret Agent X-9	Japanese Sailor	Serial, Uncredited
1945	First Yank Into Tokyo	Ling Wan	Uncredited
1947	Singapore	Clerk	Uncredited
1953	Forbidden	Chinese Clerk	Uncredited
1954	The Shanghai Story	Police Officer	Uncredited
1955	Blood Alley	Feng's #2 Nephew	Uncredited
1956	The King and I	Messenger	Uncredited
1957	The Seventh Sin	Houseboy	Uncredited
1958	Live Fast, Die Young	Phillip	Uncredited, (final film role)
