= Sky Dragon =

1949 film by Lesley Selander

- Theatrical release poster
- Directed by: Lesley Selander
- Written by: Oliver Drake; Clint Johnston
- Based on: Based on characters created by Earl Derr Biggers
- Produced by: James S. Burkett
- Starring: Roland Winters; Mantan Moreland; Keye Luke
- Cinematography: William A. Sickner
- Edited by: Roy Livingston; Ace Herman
- Music by: Edward J. Kay
- Production company: Monogram Pictures
- Distributed by: Monogram Pictures
- Release date: April 27, 1949
- Running time: 64 minutes
- Country: United States
- Language: English

Sky Dragon (also titled The Sky Dragon and Murder in the Air) is a 1949 American mystery film, the sixth in which Roland Winters portrayed Charlie Chan. Directed by Lesley Selander, it is the last Chan film in the long-running series that originated in 1930 with Fox Film Corporation production of Charlie Chan Carries On, starring Warner Oland. Mantan Moreland provides comic relief as Chan's assistant and chauffeur, Birmingham Brown.

== Plot ==
Charlie Chan and Number One Son, Lee, are passengers aboard a commercial airliner headed for San Francisco. Also on board are two insurance couriers who are carrying a shipment of $250,000. Minutes after drinking coffee that was served, everyone on board the plane falls asleep, including the crew. Lee is the first to awaken and he notices a limp hand protruding from the cockpit door. A closer look reveals that one of the couriers has been stabbed to death and that the insurance money he was carrying is missing. After the plane safely arrives, Chan and son, along with assistant, Birmingham Brown, take on the case.

== Cast ==
- Roland Winters as Charlie Chan
- Mantan Moreland as Birmingham Brown
- Keye Luke as Lee Chan
- Milburn Stone as pilot Capt. Tim Norton
- Joel Marston as copilot Don Blake
- Lyle Talbot as Andrew Barrett, passenger on DC-3
- Iris Adrian as Wanda LaFern, burlesque dancer and airline passenger
- Elena Verdugo as Wanda's sister Connie LaFern and former wife of Andrew Barrett, stewardess using the alias Marie Burke
- Paul Maxey as John Anderson, investigator for the insurance company
- John Eldredge as William French, owner of the insurance company
- Tim Ryan as Lt. Mike Ruark
- Noel Neill as Jane Marshall
- Lyle Latell as Ed Davidson
