= Mantan Moreland =

American actor and comedian (1902–1973)

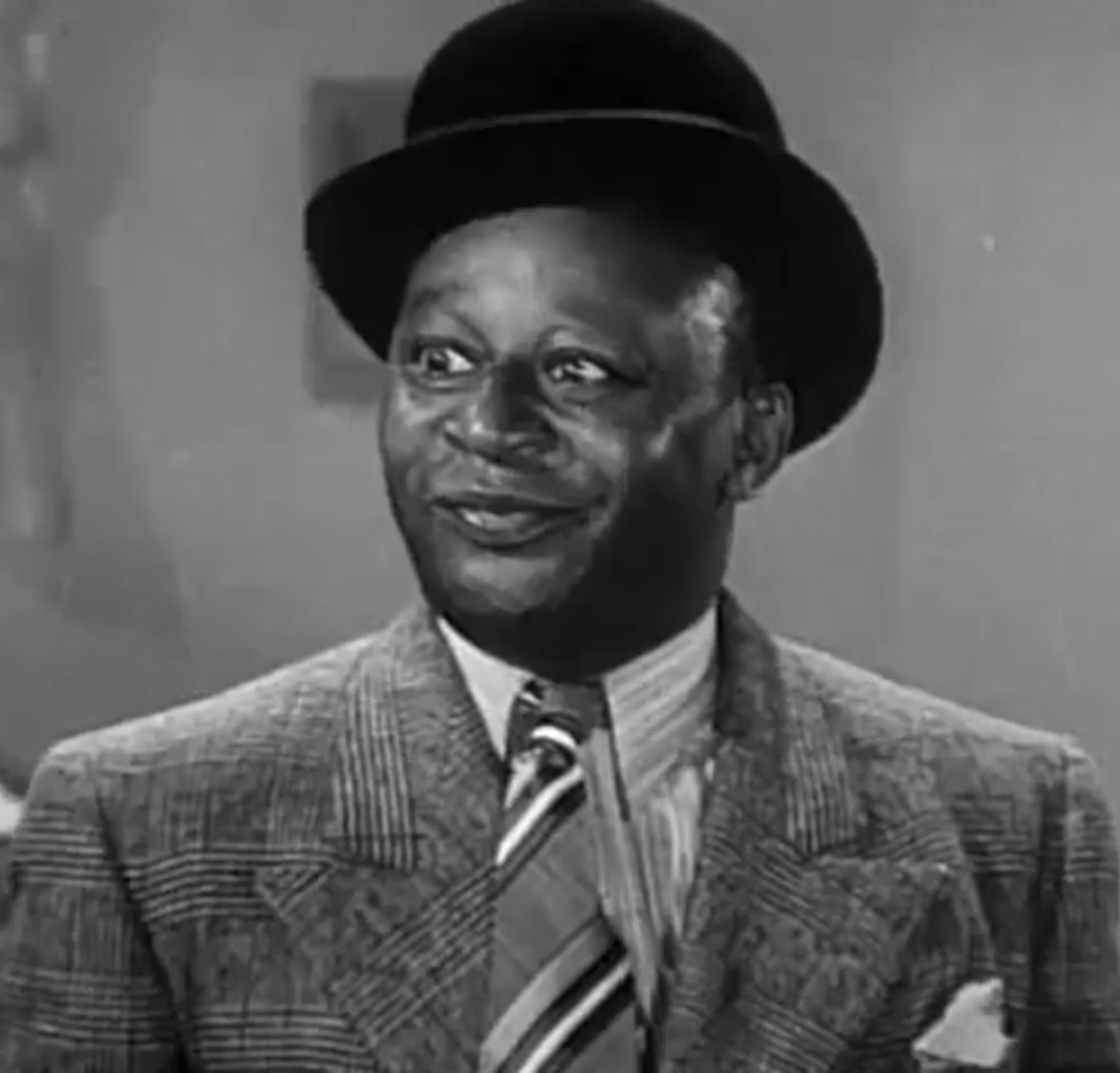
- Moreland in Let's Go Collegiate (1941)
- Born: Manton Moreland; September 3, 1902; Monroe, Louisiana, U.S.
- Died: September 28, 1973 (aged 71); Hollywood, Los Angeles, California, U.S.
- Resting place: Valhalla Memorial Park Cemetery
- Other names: Man Tan Moreland; Manton Moreland
- Occupations: Actor; comedian
- Years active: 1933–1973
- Spouse: Hazel Moreland
- Children: 1

Mantan Moreland (born Manton Moreland, September 3, 1902 – September 28, 1973) was an American actor and comedian most popular in the 1930s and 1940s. He starred in numerous films, and is best known to today's audiences as Birmingham Brown, the chauffeur in the Charlie Chan movies of the 1940s. His daughter Marcella Moreland appeared as a child actor in several films.

== Early years ==
He was born in Monroe, Louisiana, to Frank, an old-time Dixieland bandleader, and Marcella. Moreland began acting by the time he was an adolescent; some sources say he ran away to join a minstrel show in 1910, at age eight, but his daughter told Moreland's biographer she doubts this date is correct. She and other sources agree it is more likely he left home when he was fourteen.

== Career ==
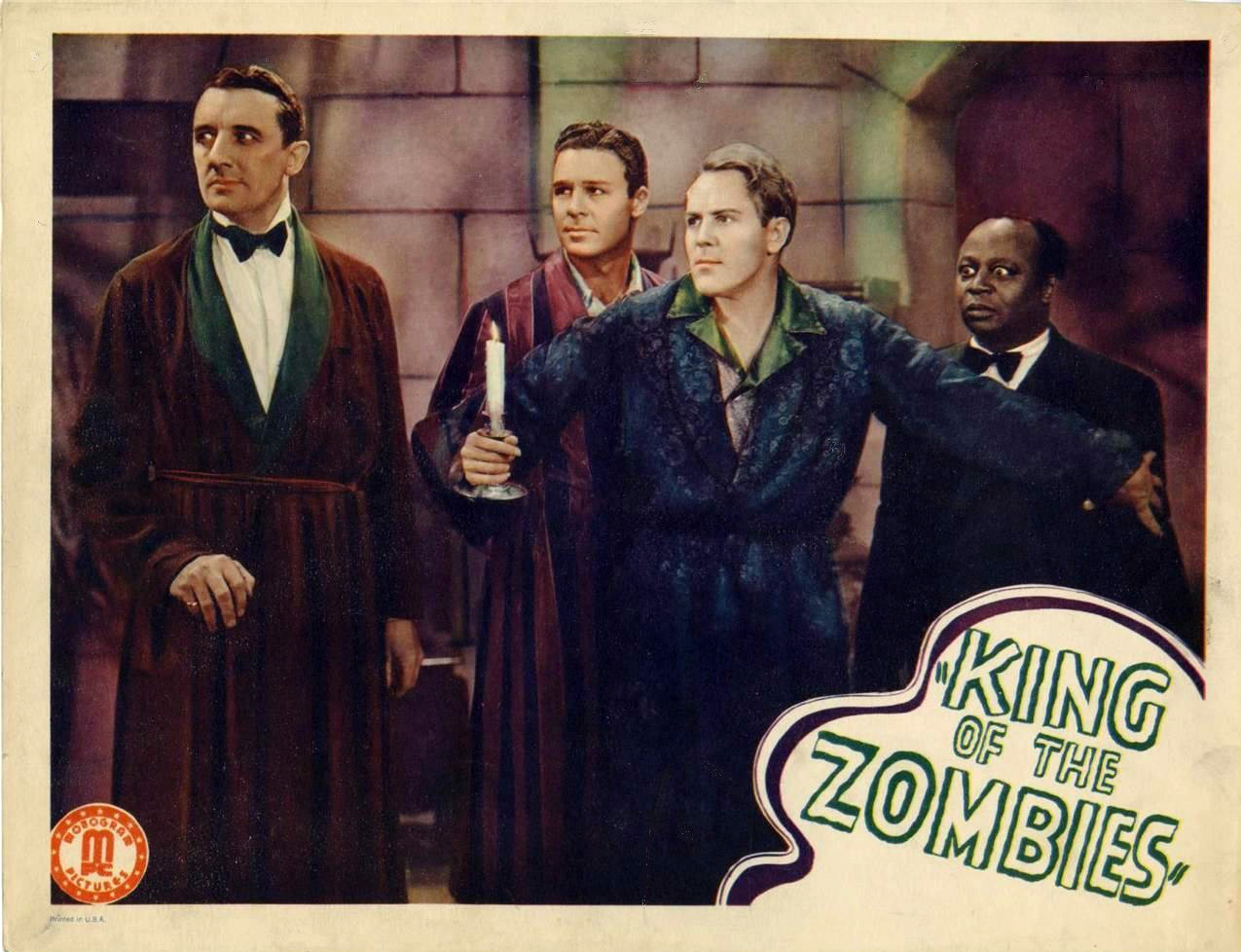
Mantan Moreland (right) in King of the Zombies

The earliest surviving notice for Manton Moreland dates from 1923, when the 21-year-old actor was part of the Shuffle Along roadshow company, touring America in an all-black-cast revue. Moreland's specialty was then dancing: "Manton Moreland is a dancing phenomenon." In 1925 he was in Jimmie Cooper's Revue, with a company of both white and black entertainers. "Jimmie is not content with staging a 'white and black' show, but departs a bit further from the beaten path by staging a 'ramble' every Friday night at midnight. In this midnight offering Jimmie promises the regular performance and some 'extras'." During the mid-1920s Moreland was listed variously in newspaper reviews as "Manton" or "Mantan".

The musical revue Blackbirds of 1928 reached Broadway and ran for 518 performances. Drama critic Brooks Atkinson commented on "Manton Moreland's nervous card-concealing art in the poker game." However, when listing the cast members in the same review, either Atkinson or the typographer spelled the actor's name as "Mantan Moreland." Moreland himself continued to be billed as Manton Moreland through 1940, but he adopted "Mantan" as his permanent professional name in 1941.

By the late 1920s, Moreland had made his way through vaudeville, working with various shows and revues, performing on Broadway and touring Europe. Following the death of Aubrey Lyles, one half of African American vaudeville act Miller and Lyles, in 1932, Flournoy Miller asked Moreland to team up with him for personal appearances. With Moreland, Miller performed comedy routines he had done with Lyles. The pair performed together in the one-reel short film That's the Spirit (1933) as a pair of night watchmen and for stage productions by Miller, Dixie Goes High Hat (1938) and Hollywood Revue (1939). Moreland appeared in low-budget "race movies" aimed at African American audiences, including One Dark Night (1939) with Bette Treadville, Lucky Ghost (1941), Mr. Washington Goes to Town (1941) and Mantan Runs for Mayor (1946), again with Miller.

As his comedic talents became recognized, Moreland appeared in larger productions. At the height of his career, Moreland received steady work from major film studios, as well as from independent producers who starred Moreland in low-budget, all-African American-cast comedies. Monogram Pictures signed Moreland to appear opposite Frankie Darro in the studio's popular action pictures. Moreland, with his bulging eyes and cackling laugh, quickly became a favorite supporting player in Hollywood movies. In 1940's Drums of the Desert, Moreland played a more serious role as the sergeant in charge of a squad of Senegalese Tirailleurs in French colonial Algeria alongside Ralph Byrd, known for appearing in Republic Pictures' Dick Tracy serials.

In 1944 he joined Monogram's new Charlie Chan series, and appeared in all but two of the popular features. (Willie Best took over his role temporarily while Moreland and his comedy-team partner Ben Carter were away from the studio, on a vaudeville tour.)

During the 1940s, Moreland and Carter made personal appearances in the nation's movie theaters. They performed comedy routines that Moreland learned when he became Flournoy Miller's understudy in the 1930s, including the famous "indefinite talk" routine, in which they would conduct entire conversations while speaking only in fragments:

MORELAND: I saw old --

CARTER: Is he still out there?

MORELAND: Yeah.

CARTER: I thought he was --

MORELAND: He was, but he got out.

CARTER: You know what I heard?

MORELAND: Not until Christmas!

CARTER: No?

MORELAND: I never did believe --

CARTER: I don't believe anything he says, either.

Moreland and Carter had developed an excellent rapport and impeccable timing. During World War II, they performed at the then segregated USOs such as one in Riverside, California. Their version of "indefinite talk" can be seen in two Charlie Chan pictures, The Scarlet Clue and Dark Alibi, as well as in the big-budget Universal musical Bowery to Broadway. The partnership lasted until Carter died in 1946. Moreland and Nipsey Russell performed this routine in two all-black variety films in 1955.

During the second half of the 1940s, the public attitudes toward the portrayals of African Americans in the cinema had changed. When filmmakers began to reassess roles given to black actors, Moreland's characterization in his film appearances was considered demeaning to the African-American community, resulting in his being offered fewer roles in the 1950s.

Moreland's steady employment in the Charlie Chan film series came to an end in 1949. With no other screen offers, and facing financial difficulties, Moreland made personal appearances during the late 1940s and the early 1950s with Bud Harris, Tim Moore, Redd Foxx, and Nipsey Russell as his straight men.

According to Moreland's biographer Michael Price, Moreland was briefly considered as a possible addition to the Three Stooges. After Shemp Howard died of a cerebral hemorrhage on November 22, 1955, at age 60, Moe Howard was said had been observing Moreland's act for years and offered Moreland a chance to join the act as the new "third stooge" at the behest of his late brother Shemp. Moreland was reported to be enthusiastic about the offer, but Columbia Pictures insisted on a comedian already under contract. Joe Besser, one of a few comedians still making comedy shorts at the studio, was eventually recruited to join the act in 1956.

== Later career and death ==
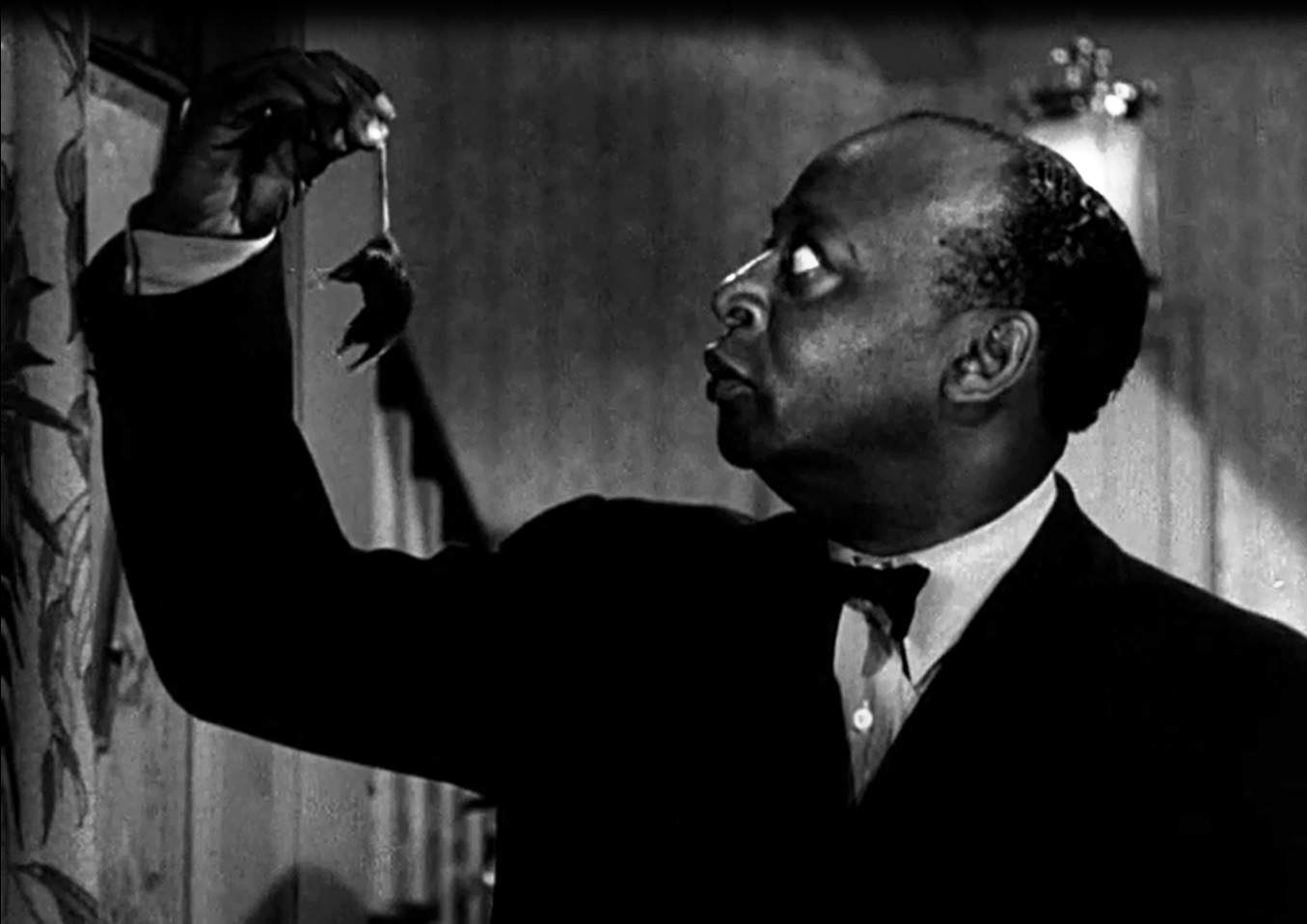
Mantan Moreland as Birmingham Brown in The Trap

Moreland's last featured role was in the darkly humorous horror film Spider Baby (1968, filmed in 1964), which was patterned after Universal's thrillers of the 1940s. After suffering a stroke in the early 1960s, Moreland took on a few minor comedic roles, working with Bill Cosby, Moms Mabley and Carl Reiner. He later partnered with Roosevelt Livingood to form the comedic team of Mantan and Livingood; they recorded a number of albums for Laff Records.

Moreland died of a cerebral hemorrhage in 1973 in Hollywood, aged 71, and is interred at Valhalla Memorial Park Cemetery in North Hollywood, Los Angeles, California.

== Recognition ==
In 2004, Moreland was inducted into the National Multicultural Western Heritage Museum Hall of Fame.

== Selected filmography ==
- That's the Spirit (1933) as Night Watchman
- The Green Pastures (1936) as Angel Removing Hat (uncredited)
- Harlem on the Prairie (1937) as Mistletoe
- Spirit of Youth (1938) as Creighton 'Crickie' Fitzgibbons
- Two-Gun Man from Harlem (1938) as Bill Blake
- Frontier Scout (1938) as Norris Family Butler
- Next Time I Marry (1938) as Tilby
- Gang Smashers (1938) as Gloomy
- There's Always a Woman (1939) as Porter (uncredited)
- Tell No Tales (1939) as Sport Black at the Wake (uncredited)
- Riders of the Frontier (1939) as Chappie (Cookie in credits)
- Irish Luck (1939) as Jefferson
- One Dark Night (1939) as Samson Brown
- The Man Who Wouldn't Talk (1940) as Robbins (uncredited)
- City of Chance (1940) as Anxious Man (uncredited)
- Chasing Trouble (1940) as Thomas H. Jefferson
- Millionaire Playboy (1940) as Bellhop
- Viva Cisco Kid (1940) as Memphis - The Cook (uncredited)
- Star Dust (1940) as George, Dining Car Steward (uncredited)
- Girl in 313 (1940) as Porter
- On the Spot (1940) as Jefferson White
- Maryland (1940) (uncredited)
- Pier 13 (1940) as Sam - Elevator Operator (uncredited)
- Laughing at Danger (1940) as Jefferson
- Up in the Air (1940) as Jeff
- While Thousands Cheer (1940) as Nash
- Drums of the Desert (1940) as Sergeant 'Blue' Williams
- Four Shall Die (1940) as Beefus - Touissant's Chauffeur
- Lady from Louisiana (1941) as Servant (uncredited)
- You're Out of Luck (1941) as Jeff Jefferson
- Sleepers West (1941) as Porter (uncredited)
- Footlight Fever (1941) as Willie Hamsure - Elevator Operator (uncredited)
- Ellery Queen's Penthouse Mystery (1941) as Roy
- Sign of the Wolf (1941) as Ben
- Mr. Washington Goes to Town (1941) as Schenectady Jones
- King of the Zombies (1941) as Jeff
- Hello, Sucker (1941) as Elevator Boy
- Bachelor Daddy (1941) as Club Janitor (uncredited)
- The Gang's All Here (1941) as Jefferson 'Jeff' Smith
- Cracked Nuts (1941) as Burgess
- Accent on Love (1941) as Prisoner in Courtroom (uncredited)
- Dressed to Kill (1941) as Rusty
- World Premiere (1941) as Train Porter (uncredited)
- Let's Go Collegiate (1941) as Jeff
- It Started with Eve (1941) as Railway Porter (uncredited)
- Birth of the Blues (1941) as Black Trumpet Player (uncredited)
- Marry the Boss's Daughter (1941) as Cook (uncredited)
- Up Jumped the Devil (1941) as Washington
- Freckles Comes Home (1942) as Jeff - the Hotel Porter
- Treat 'Em Rough (1942) as 'Snake-Eyes'
- Four Jacks and a Jill (1942) as Cicero - Wash Room Attendant (uncredited)
- Law of the Jungle (1942) as Jefferson 'Jeff' Jones
- Lucky Ghost (1942) as Washington
- Professor Creeps (1942) as Washington
- The Strange Case of Doctor Rx (1942) as Horatio B.Fitz Washington
- Tarzan's New York Adventure (1942) as Sam, the Nightclub Janitor (uncredited)
- Mexican Spitfire Sees a Ghost (1942) as Lightnin'
- Footlight Serenade (1942) as Amos. Tommy's Dresser
- A-Haunting We Will Go (1942) as Porter (uncredited)
- Phantom Killer (1942) as Nicodemus
- Girl Trouble (1942) as Edward
- Eyes in the Night (1942) as Alistair
- The Palm Beach Story (1942) as Diner Waiter (uncredited)
- Andy Hardy's Double Life (1942) as Prentiss the Benedict Butler (uncredited)
- It Comes Up Love (1943) as Janitor (uncredited)
- The Crime Smasher (1943) as Eustace Smith
- Cabin in the Sky (1943) as First Idea Man
- Slightly Dangerous (1943) as Waiter at Swade's (uncredited)
- He Hired the Boss (1943) as Shoeshine Man (uncredited)
- Sarong Girl (1943) as Maxwell
- Hit the Ice (1943) as Porter with Snowshoes (uncredited)
- We've Never Been Licked (1943) as Willie
- Melody Parade (1943) as Skidmore
- Revenge of the Zombies (1943) as Jeff
- Hi'ya, Sailor (1943) as Sam
- You're a Lucky Fellow, Mr. Smith (1943) as Porter
- My Kingdom for a Cook (1943) as Train Porter (uncredited)
- Swing Fever (1943) as Woody, Nick's Valet (uncredited)
- She's for Me (1943) as Sam
- Chip Off the Old Block (1944) as Porter
- Charlie Chan in the Secret Service (1944) as Birmingham Brown
- See Here, Private Hargrove (1944) as Porter on Train (uncredited)
- Moon Over Las Vegas (1944) as Porter
- Pin-Up Girl (1944) as Red Cap #2 (uncredited)
- This Is the Life (1944) as Porter (uncredited)
- The Chinese Cat (1944) as Birmingham Brown
- South of Dixie (1944) as The Porter
- Black Magic (1944) as Birmingham Brown
- Mystery of the River Boat (1944, serial) as Napoleon the ship steerer
- Bowery to Broadway (1944) as Alabam
- The Jade Mask (1945) as Birmingham Brown
- The Scarlet Clue (1945) as Birmingham Brown
- The Shanghai Cobra (1945) as Birmingham Brown
- Captain Tugboat Annie (1945) as Pinto
- She Wouldn't Say Yes (1945) as porter (uncredited)
- The Spider (1945) as Henry
- Mantan Messes Up (1946) as Mantan
- Riverboat Rhythm (1946) as Mantan
- Dark Alibi (1946) as Birmingham Brown
- Shadows Over Chinatown (1946) as Birmingham Brown
- The Trap (1946) as Birmingham Brown
- Tall, Tan, and Terrific (1946) as Mantan Moreland
- Mantan Runs for Mayor (1946)
- The Chinese Ring (1947) as Birmingham Brown
- Ebony Parade (1947) as Mantan
- What a Guy (1947)
- The Dreamer (1947)
- Docks of New Orleans (1948) as Birmingham Brown
- Best Man Wins (1948) as Ice Cream Vendor (uncredited)
- Shanghai Chest (1948) as Birmingham Brown
- The Golden Eye (1948) as Birmingham Brown
- The Feathered Serpent (1948) as Birmingham Brown
- The Return of Mandy's Husband (1948)
- She's Too Mean for Me (1948)
- Come on, Cowboy! (1948)
- Sky Dragon (1949) as Birmingham Brown
- Rock 'n' Roll Revue (1955) as Himself
- Rockin' the Blues (1956) as Himself
- Basin Street Revue (1956) as Himself
- The Patsy (1964) as Barbershop Porter (uncredited)
- Spider Baby (filmed in 1964, released in 1968) as Messenger
- Alvarez Kelly (1966) as Bartender (uncredited)
- Enter Laughing (1967) as Subway Rider
- The Comic (1969) as Passerby at Billy's Funeral (uncredited)
- Watermelon Man (1970) as Counterman
- The Biscuit Eater (1972) as Waiter
- The Young Nurses (1973) as Old Man (final film role)

Television

- 1957 Hallmark Hall of Fame (1 episode)
- 1969 Julia (1 episode)
- 1969 Love, American Style (1 episode)
- 1970 The Bill Cosby Show (1 episode)
- 1970 Adam-12 (1 episode)

== Recordings ==
- That Ain't My Finger (Laff Records)
- Elsie's Sportin' House (Laff Records)
- Tribute to the Man (Laff Records)

== Cultural references ==
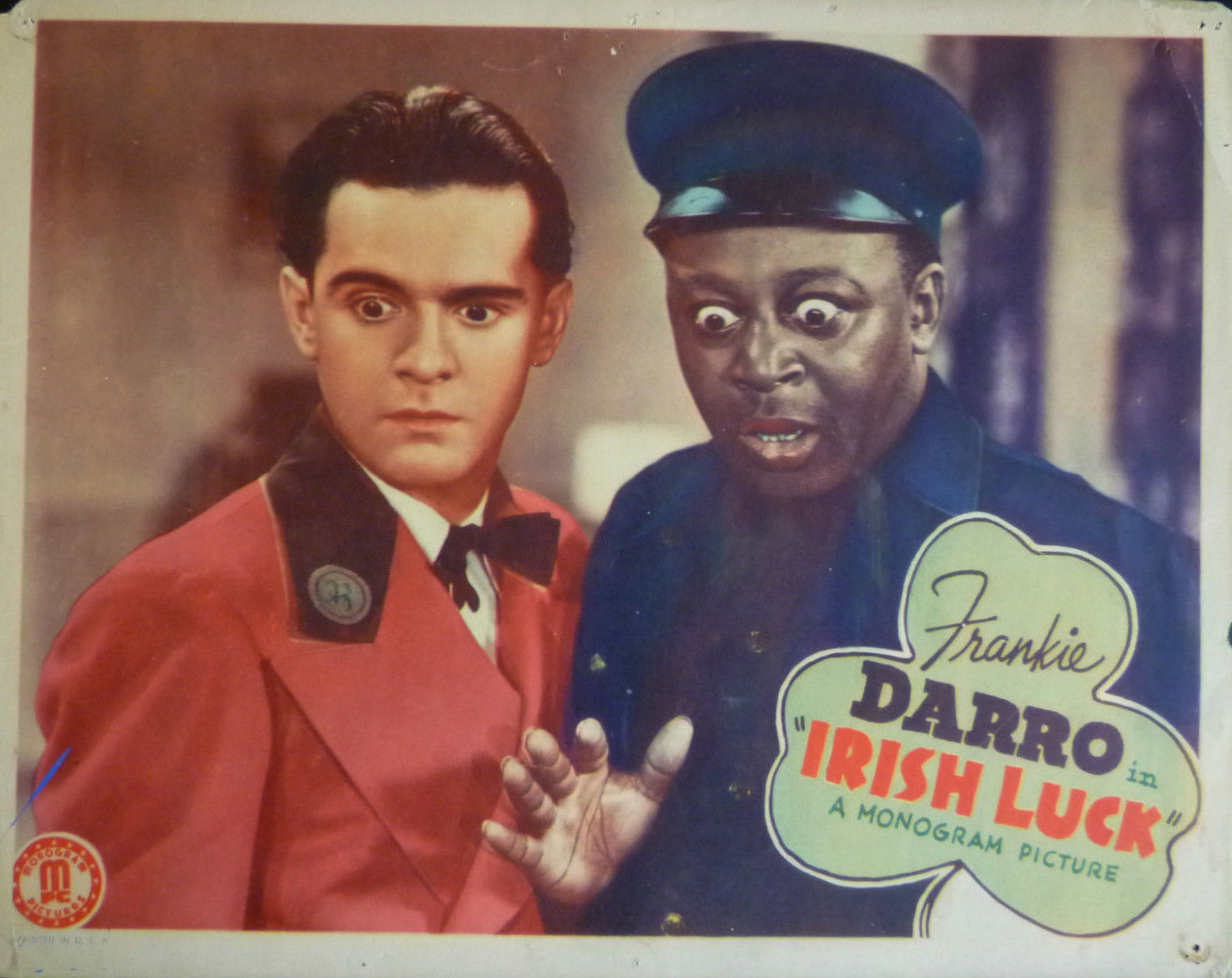
Mantan Moreland (right) in the film Irish Luck

Robert B. Parker makes allusions to Moreland in A Catskill Eagle and Hush Money, both being part of his long-running series of Spenser novels.

Bamboozled, a 2000 film directed by Spike Lee, centers around a fictional television show called Mantan: The New Millennium Minstrel Show featuring stereotypes of minstrel theater and starring a tap dancing character, played by Savion Glover, named Mantan. Clips of Moreland are featured during a montage at the end of the film.

"B-Boys Makin with the Freak Freak", a song by Beastie Boys featured on their 1994 album Ill Communication, samples a line from Mantan's comedy album That Ain't My Finger, referencing a bit about a party and mashed potatoes.
