= Pacific Southwest Airlines Flight 710 =

1972 aircraft hijacking

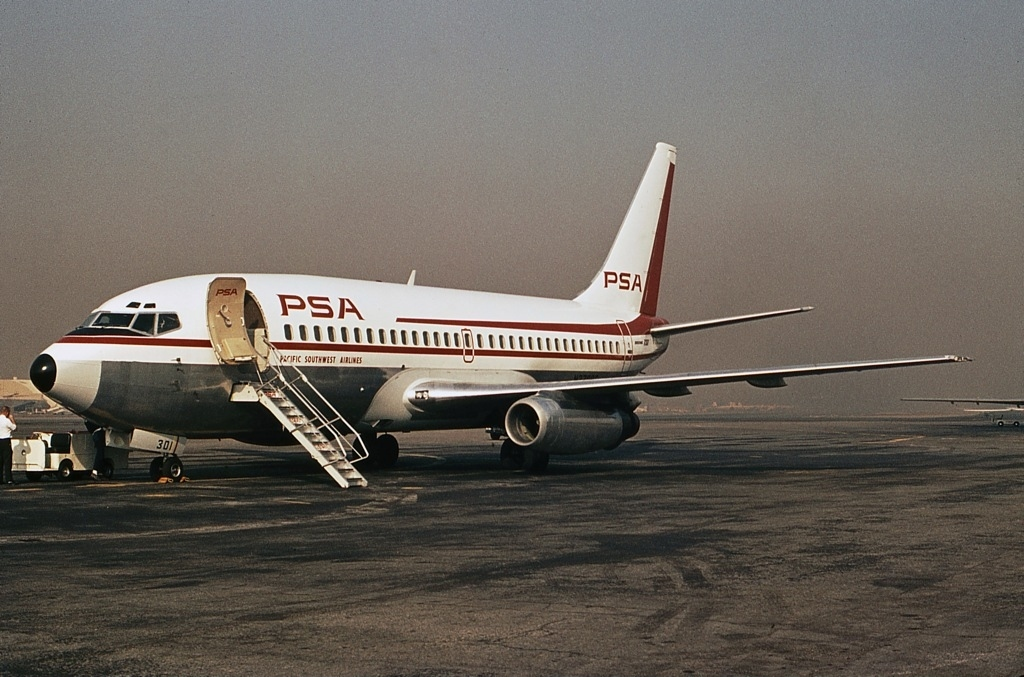
- A PSA Boeing 737-200 in c. 1972 livery

Incident
- Date: July 5, 1972
- Summary: Hijacking
- Site: over California

Aircraft
- Aircraft type: Boeing 737-200
- Operator: Pacific Southwest Airlines
- IATA flight No.: PS710
- ICAO flight No.: PSA710
- Call sign: PSA 710
- Flight origin: Sacramento Airport
- Stopover: San Francisco International Airport
- Destination: Los Angeles International Airport
- Passengers: 77
- Crew: 7
- Fatalities: 3 (including both hijackers)
- Injuries: 2
- Survivors: 81

Pacific Southwest Airlines Flight 710 was a Boeing 737-200 flight between the California cities of Sacramento and Burbank, with a stop in San Francisco, that was hijacked by two Bulgarian nationals on July 5, 1972, shortly after take-off from Sacramento Airport. The hijackers demanded $800,000, two parachutes and to be taken to the Soviet Union. The plane landed at the San Francisco Airport, then took off after 20 minutes and spent the next hour circling while the hijackers waited for the airline to accept their demands.

The hijacking ended on the runway at San Francisco International Airport when four agents from the Federal Bureau of Investigation stormed the plane, killing both hijackers. Passenger E. H. Stanley Carter, a 66-year-old retired railroad conductor from Montreal, was also killed; passengers Leo R. Gormley, a recently retired railroad conductor of Los Angeles, and actor Victor Sen Yung were wounded but survived. They were the first passengers killed or wounded in a hijacking in the United States. The hijackers were identified as 28-year-old Dimitr Alexiev of Hayward, California, and 28-year-old Michael Dimitrov Azmanoff, of unknown residence.

== Hijacking ==
Azmanoff, a 28-year-old Bulgarian refugee who had once served as an Army truck driver, boarded the Boeing 737 in San Francisco with his friend, Dimitr Alexiev. As soon as the seat-belt sign was switched off, the hijackers produced pistols and made their demands: $800,000 in small bills, two parachutes, and the navigation charts necessary to get them to Siberia. The plane returned to San Francisco, where the hijackers agreed to take on a new pilot with international experience. As the pilot approached the idling plane, the hijackers forced him to strip down to his underwear, to make sure he wasn't armed. The pilot, who was an FBI agent in disguise, did so slowly, so that a team of agents armed with shotguns could sneak up on the aircraft; these agents had evaded detection by approaching in a boat in the surrounding bay. The faux pilot was eventually cleared to board; he was followed by his fellow agents, who wildly opened fire in the cabin. Alexiev, who was standing by the cockpit, was killed instantly, but Azmanoff hunkered down in the rear of the plane and conducted a gun battle with the agents. He was killed in the melee, along with Carter, the retired railroad conductor. Two more passengers were injured, including Victor Sen Yung, the San Francisco-born actor who played the popular cook, Hop Sing, on the long-running Western television series Bonanza and the character Jimmy Chan in the popular Charlie Chan series of films starting in 1938.

== Plan of the hijackers ==
Azmanoff and Alexiev were revealed to have an elaborate scheme in mind, which involved an accomplice named Lubomir Peichev. The pair had planned to jettison two inflatable dummies from the plane, then land at a rural airstrip in British Columbia. Peichev was supposed to meet them there, in a light plane he would hijack; the trio would then head back south across the border, to enjoy their $800,000. Peichev was sentenced to life in prison for his role in the bizarre plot.

Over the weekend of June 16–19, 1972, Peichev, Azmanoff and Alexiev traveled by car to Washington state, allegedly in search of gold. During this trip they also traveled to Vancouver and to Hope, British Columbia and Puntzi Mountain Airport, two remote landing sites, both over 100 miles from Vancouver. While on this trip, plans were made for Azmanoff and Alexiev to hijack an airplane and to fly it to a remote airport in Canada. There, a fourth person would be waiting with a car ready to take the skyjackers to an apartment hide-out on the outskirts of Vancouver. Peichev was to rent a private plane and meet them at an auxiliary landing strip in case the hijacked plane was unable to land at the preferred airport.

The three men returned to San Francisco and, on July 1, 1972, met at the San Francisco International Airport with Illia Shishkoff who agreed to meet Peichev at noon on July 4, at the Vancouver Airport and to rent an apartment in the outskirts of the city. On July 3, Peichev withdrew $1,700 from his bank account and borrowed a gun under the guise of a need to protect himself while hunting for gold. Later the same day, he met with Alexiev and Azmanoff at the San Francisco International Airport. They gave him a plane ticket to Seattle and told him to take a bus to Vancouver.

After meeting Shishkoff in Vancouver, Peichev rented two cars and traveled with Shishkoff to Hope Airport, approximately 100 miles, and returned to Vancouver. The following day, July 5, Peichev rented a private plane and hired a pilot to fly him to Bella Coola and then to Anahim Lake. While at Anahim Lake, Peichev learned by radio that the hijack attempt had failed. He proceeded to Puntzi airstrip where he spent the night and then returned to Vancouver. In Vancouver he met Shishkoff and arranged for the return of the rental cars and then returned to San Francisco.

On July 5, the same day that Peichev flew to Puntzi airstrip, Azmanoff and Alexiev hijacked the Pacific Southwest Airlines flight. After the gunfight, the F.B.I. agents found on the bodies of the hijackers a map of British Columbia, Canada, and a small piece of note paper containing the map coordinates of the Puntzi airstrip.

== Accomplices ==
Peichev concedes that he rented a plane and flew to the Puntzi airstrip by prearrangement with Azmanoff and Alexiev, but contends that he was coerced to do so. His statements as reported by the other witnesses belie this contention. Shishkoff testified that when he met Peichev in Vancouver, Peichev was clearly in charge of directing the car rentals, surveying the Hope airport and directing where to hide the cars. Shishkoff also testified that Peichev, after meeting him at the Vancouver Airport following the failure of the hijacking plan, stated: "They are stupid... I'd planned everything so good. They are stupid. They ask for too much money."

Peichev argued that the evidence was insufficient to support his conviction of aiding and abetting aircraft piracy. Under count one, Peichev was charged with only aiding and abetting aircraft piracy, not additionally with counseling, commanding, inducing or procuring its commission as is also provided in 18 U.S.C. 2. He conceded for the sake of argument that the evidence was sufficient to show a conspiracy, but argued that the government did not show that he aided and abetted in the perpetration of the crime. His appeal failed and he was sentenced to life imprisonment.
