= The Trap (1946 film) =

1946 film by Howard Bretherton

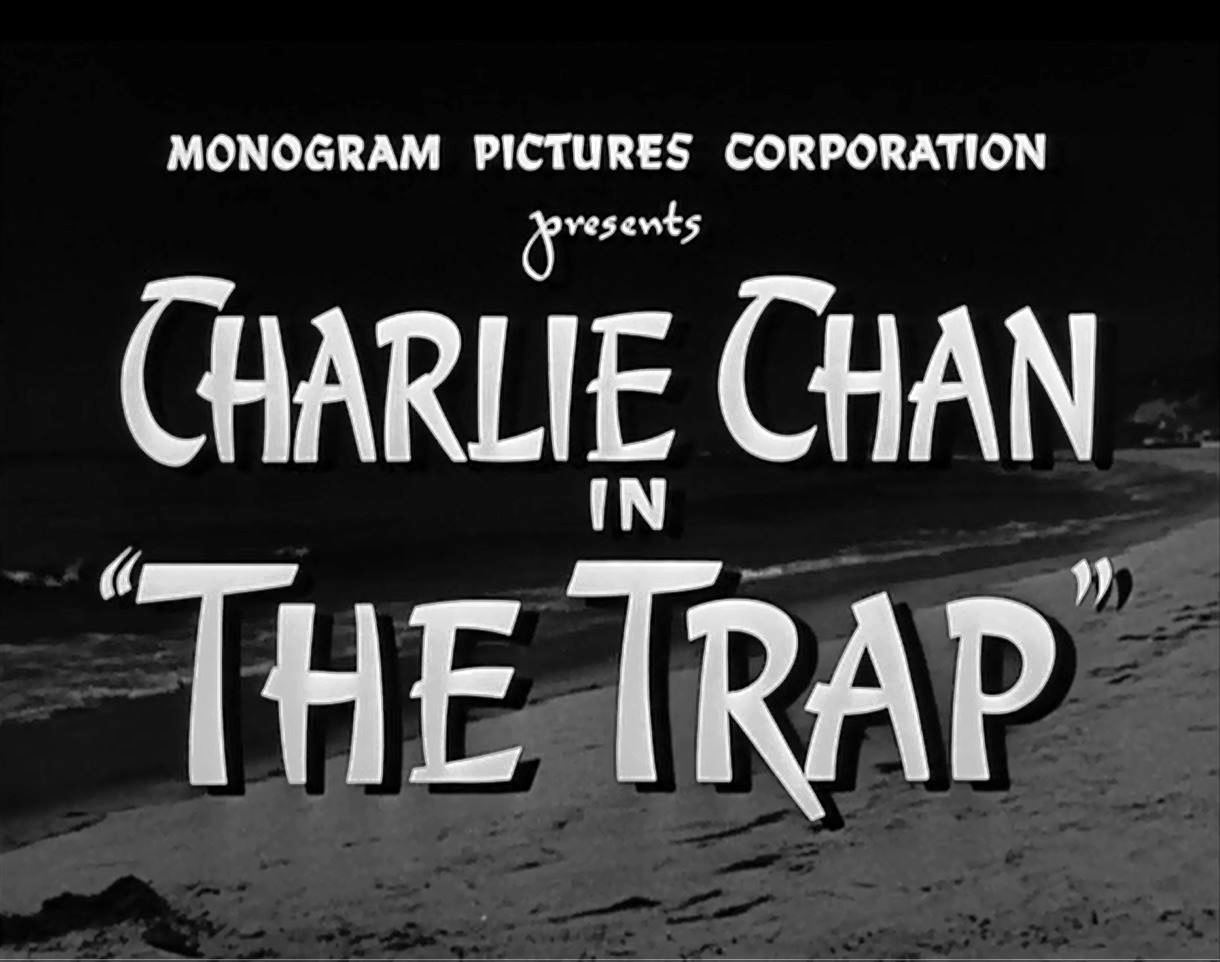
- title from film
- Directed by: Howard Bretherton
- Written by: Miriam Kissinger; Earl Derr Biggers
- Produced by: James S. Burkett
- Starring: Sidney Toler; Victor Sen Yung
- Cinematography: James S. Brown Jr.
- Edited by: Ace Herman
- Music by: Edward J. Kay
- Production company: Monogram Pictures
- Distributed by: Monogram Pictures
- Release date: November 30, 1946
- Running time: 62 minutes
- Country: United States
- Language: English

The Trap is a 1946 American mystery crime film directed by Howard Bretherton and starring Sidney Toler and Victor Sen Yung. This was Toler's 22nd and final appearance as Chan, and his final performance of any kind.

== Plot ==
Cole King's theatrical ensemble resides at a beach house in Malibu, California. Adelaide, one of the showgirls, challenges Cole's girl Marcia. Marcia retaliates by threatening to reveal Adelaide's secret marriage to disgraced doctor George Brandt. She also steals a letter to Adelaide from Brandt. Marcia also knows that one of the other showgirls, Lois, is hiding the fact that she is under eighteen.

Another member of the troupe, San Toy, finds a dead body: Lois. Marcia has become a suspect, having fled the scene. The cause of death is strangulation, and the technique is often used by the French and the Chinese. Immediately, the French Adelaide and Chinese San Toy are placed under suspicion as possible perpetrators.

San Toy contacts her friend Jimmy Chan, son of famous sleuth Charlie Chan, asking for help. Jimmy rushes to the crime scene and tries to launch an investigation himself, but the elder Chan arrives and takes charge. A mysterious assailant attacks Chan's chauffeur Birmingham, and then San Toy. Marcia is found dead, strangled on the beach, with a silk cord still around her neck.

Suspicion points to many members of the Cole King company, but Chan sets a trap to catch the real killer. Everything works as planned: the killer tries to strangle San Toy that night. Jimmy comes to San's rescue but foils the trap.

Chan, Birmingham, and Jimmy then chase and confront the killer. Dr. Brandt is cleared of all suspicion, and Chan promises to restore Brandt's license by talking to the Board of Medical Examiners.

== Production ==
The Trap was a troubled production, filmed in July and August 1946. Star Sidney Toler, suffering from cancer during his last few films, was now so weak that he could hardly walk, and could stand for only short periods of time. The film was structured to accommodate Toler's fragile condition: his scenes are limited (he doesn't make his entrance until 16 minutes into the picture), and the script often concentrates on his assistants to relieve Toler of the physical action.

When the film was released in November 1946, trade comments were generally negative, noting the film's patchwork construction. Trade publisher Pete Harrison was blunt: "A new low for the series. The picture does not have one redeeming feature." Toler, now too ill to work in pictures, was forced into retirement and died in February 1947.

== Cast ==
- Sidney Toler as Charlie Chan
- Victor Sen Yung as Jimmy Chan (as Victor Sen Young)
- Mantan Moreland as Birmingham Brown
- Tanis Chandler as Adelaide Brandt
- Larry J. Blake as Rick Daniels (as Larry Blake)
- Kirk Alyn as Sgt. Reynolds
- Rita Quigley as Clementine
- Anne Nagel as Marcia
- Helen Gerald as Ruby
- Howard Negley as Cole King, impresario
- Lois Austin as Mrs. Thorn
- Barbara Jean Wong as San Toy
- Minerva Urecal as Miss Weebles, housekeeper
- Margaret Brayton as Madge Mudge
- Bettie Best as Winifred
- Jan Bryant as Lois
- Walden Boyle as Dr. George Brandt

== Copyright status ==
While some presume the film to be in the public domain, due to the omission of a valid copyright notice on original-release prints, The Trap was indeed registered for copyright by Monogram Pictures on November 26, 1946 (certificate number LP728).
