= Barricade (1939 film) =

1939 film by Gregory Ratoff

- Theatrical release poster
- Directed by: Gregory Ratoff
- Written by: Granville Walker
- Produced by: Edward Kaufman
- Starring: Alice Faye; Warner Baxter; Charles Winninger; Arthur Treacher; Keye Luke
- Cinematography: Karl Freund
- Edited by: Jack Dennis
- Music by: David Buttolph
- Production company: 20th Century Fox
- Release date: December 8, 1939
- Running time: 71 minutes
- Country: United States
- Language: English

Barricade is a 1939 adventure film directed by Gregory Ratoff and starring Alice Faye, Warner Baxter, Charles Winninger, Arthur Treacher, and Keye Luke.

== Plot ==
A singer named Emmy meets broken-down journalist Hank Topping while travelling across Mongolia by train. A romance sparks, but is soon interrupted by a fierce group of murderous bandits. Fleeing, Emmy and Hank team up with others, eventually culminating in a fierce shootout with the marauders. A youngster of ten years, the Emmy and Hank team seek safety in a small fort or an antiquated country home located on barren lands. As the bandits approach, they hide in a basement level, protected only by a floorboard cover. As the bandits enter the building, the baby of Emmy and Hank begins to cry, thereby revealing the location of the couple and their team. As the bandits begin to chop their way through the floorboards, a rescue squad on motorcycles speeds over a nearby hill towards the building, then succeeding to rescue those trapped below the floor.

== Cast ==
- Alice Faye as Emmy Jordan
- Warner Baxter as Hank Topping
- Charles Winninger as Samuel J. Cady
- Arthur Treacher as Upton Ward
- Keye Luke as Ling - Cady's Secretary
- Willie Fung as Yen - Cady's Major Domo
- Doris Lloyd as Mrs. Ward
- Eily Malyon as Mrs. Little - Head of Mission
- Joan Carroll as Winifred Ward (as Joan Carol)
- Leonid Snegoff as Boris - Russian Consul
- Philip Ahn as Col. Wai Kang
- Jonathan Hale as Assistant Secretary of State
- Moroni Olsen as Shanghai Managing Editor
- Harry Hayden as Shanghai Telegraph Manager

== Production ==
20th Century Fox considered the film mediocre and it was shelved. A year later, with actress Alice Faye's popularity booming, the film was released to expected sub-par success. There were extensive revisions and retakes which eliminated actors J. Edward Bromberg and Joseph Schildkraut from the cast. The song "There'll Be Other Nights" by Lew Brown and Lew Pollack, recorded by Alice Faye, was cut from the final print.
