= Chevron Theatre =

American TV anthology series (1952–1954)

Chevron Theatre is an American, 30-minute, filmed television anthology series, produced by MCA/Revue Productions for first-run syndication. A total of 105 episodes aired from 1952 to 1954.

Among its guest stars were Natalie Wood (in her TV debut), Raymond Burr, Bonita Granville, Buddy Ebsen, Mona Freeman, Craig Stevens, Tommy Rettig, Carolyn Jones, Barbara Billingsley, and Peter Graves.

Richard Irving produced the series for Revue Productions. Carl Hiecke was production manager. The program was filmed at Republic Studios.
