= Chester Gan =

American actor (1908–1959)

Chester Bue Gan
- Born: July 4, 1908; Grass Valley, California, U.S.
- Died: June 29, 1959 (aged 50); San Francisco, California, U.S.
- Occupation: Actor
- Years active: 1932–1959
- Spouse: Mei Heong Lee

Chester Gan (1908-1959) was an American character actor of Chinese descent who worked in Hollywood from the 1930s through the 1950s.

== Biography ==
Chester Gan was born in Grass Valley, California, to Wing Hong Gan and Wong Shee. He went to China for a university education, where he developed an interest in acting. Upon his return to the United States, he headed to Los Angeles, where he worked as an engineer.

In 1932, Gan's acting career in Hollywood began as a Chinese guard in Secrets of the French Police. Gan played almost a hundred roles, typically portraying Asian stereotypes, from the Chinese cook or waiter to the Japanese enemy soldier. (He once joked that as an actor, he was responsible for hundreds of on-screen deaths.) He also worked as an interpreter and a consultant on Chinese culture and customs on Hollywood films like The Good Earth.

Aside from his acting career, owned a slipper store and a restaurant in Los Angeles's Chinatown neighborhood. World War II put a pause on his career as an actor, as he joined the navy. He died in San Francisco—where he operated a photography business—in 1959 after a brief illness. He was survived by his wife, his four children, and his father.

== Selected filmography ==
| Year | Title | Role | Notes |
|---|---|---|---|
| 1931 | Prestige | Soldier in Indo-China | Uncredited |
| 1932 | War Correspondent | Bandit | Uncredited |
| 1932 | Secrets of the French Police | Chinese Guard | Uncredited |
| 1933 | The World Gone Mad | Alpha Delta - Houston's Servant | Uncredited |
| 1933 | Meet the Baron | Chinese Man | Uncredited |
| 1934 | Lazy River | Sam Kee's Henchman | Uncredited |
| 1934 | Monte Carlo Nights | Larry's Valet | Uncredited |
| 1934 | The Red Rider | Wing | Serial, Uncredited |
| 1934 | Fighting Through | Wong | |
| 1934 | Tailspin Tommy | Flapjack - the Cook | Serial, Ch. 1, Uncredited |
| 1934 | The Mysterious Mr. Wong | Tung's Secret Service Agent | Uncredited |
| 1935 | The Case of the Curious Bride | Ping - Perry's Servant at Party | Uncredited |
| 1935 | Vagabond Lady | Japanese Fisherman | Uncredited |
| 1935 | Shadows of the Orient | Chinaman at Canton House | Uncredited |
| 1935 | China Seas | Rickshaw Boy | Uncredited |
| 1935 | Wanderer of the Wasteland | Ling | |
| 1935 | The Bishop Misbehaves | Chinese Man Smoking | Uncredited |
| 1935 | Stormy | Chinaman | Uncredited |
| 1935 | Moonlight on the Prairie | Chinese Cook | Uncredited |
| 1935 | East of Java | Crewman | Uncredited |
| 1935 | Last of the Pagans | Chinese Cook | Uncredited |
| 1936 | The Adventures of Frank Merriwell | Lumber Camp Cook | Serial, Uncredited |
| 1936 | Drift Fence | Clarence | Uncredited |
| 1936 | Klondike Annie | Ship's Cook | Uncredited |
| 1936 | Sutter's Gold | Charlie - Chinese Waiter | Uncredited |
| 1936 | Small Town Girl | Wing | Uncredited |
| 1936 | The Country Beyond | Chinese Cook | Uncredited |
| 1936 | San Francisco | Jowl Lee | Uncredited |
| 1936 | Sea Spoilers | Oil | |
| 1936 | Ace Drummond | Kai-Chek | Serial |
| 1936 | Mad Holiday | Vendor | Uncredited |
| 1936 | Hideaway Girl | Chinese cook | |
| 1936 | Arizona Mahoney | Chinese Man at Sing-a-Long | Uncredited |
| 1936 | Crack-Up | House Boy | Uncredited |
| 1936 | Stowaway | Chinese Merchant | Uncredited |
| 1936 | After the Thin Man | Chinese Waiter | Uncredited |
| 1937 | The Mighty Treve | Chang | |
| 1937 | The Good Earth | Teahouse Singer | Uncredited, (credited as Chester Gann) |
| 1937 | China Passage | Rooftop Marauder | Uncredited |
| 1937 | Slave Ship | Crew Member | Uncredited |
| 1937 | Wild West Days | Wong, 1st Cook | Serial, (Ch's. 4-5) |
| 1937 | West of Shanghai | Kung Nui | |
| 1937 | Mannequin | Chinese Waiter | Uncredited |
| 1937 | Thank You, Mr. Moto | Wing | Uncredited |
| 1937 | Wells Fargo | Chinese Workman | Uncredited |
| 1938 | Love Is a Headache | Louie, Peter's Butler | Uncredited |
| 1938 | International Settlement | Green Dragon Proprietor | Uncredited |
| 1938 | Gold Is Where You Find It | Wong - McCooey's Servant | Uncredited |
| 1938 | Air Devils | Hotel Waiter | Uncredited |
| 1938 | Speed to Burn | Chung | Uncredited |
| 1938 | The Mexicali Kid | Mo Cort - Chinese Cook | |
| 1938 | Too Hot to Handle | Chinese Sergeant | Uncredited |
| 1938 | Shadows Over Shanghai | Lun Sat Li | |
| 1939 | North of Shanghai | Policeman 'C' | |
| 1939 | Blackwell's Island | Wong, Prison Laundryman | Uncredited |
| 1939 | Nancy Drew... Reporter | Waiter | Uncredited |
| 1939 | The Mystery of Mr. Wong | Sing, the Butler | |
| 1939 | King of Chinatown | Mr. Foo | |
| 1939 | Torchy Runs for Mayor | Ling - Ward's Assistant | Uncredited |
| 1939 | No Place to Go | Cheng | Uncredited |
| 1939 | Barricade | Mongol Bandit Leader | Uncredited |
| 1939 | Westbound Stage | Charlie | |
| 1940 | My Little Chickadee | Chinese Train Passenger | Uncredited |
| 1940 | 'Til We Meet Again | Hong Kong Policeman | Uncredited |
| 1940 | Pals of the Silver Sage | Ling | |
| 1940 | The Carson City Kid | Wong Lee | |
| 1940 | Victory | Wang | |
| 1941 | Ellery Queen's Penthouse Mystery | Henchman | Uncredited |
| 1941 | Man-Made Monster | Wong | |
| 1941 | Singapore Woman | Waiter at Crow's Nest | Uncredited |
| 1941 | The Get-Away | Sam | |
| 1941 | They Met in Bombay | Woo Tau Woo | Uncredited |
| 1941 | Rawhide Rangers | Sing Lo - the Cook | |
| 1941 | Passage from Hong Kong | Chung | |
| 1941 | The Maltese Falcon | Bit Part | Uncredited |
| 1941 | Burma Convoy | Keela | |
| 1942 | All Through the Night | Gloves' Rescuer at Nazi Meeting | Uncredited |
| 1942 | A Yank on the Burma Road | Doctor | Uncredited |
| 1942 | To the Shores of Tripoli | Chinese Man Watching Parade | Uncredited |
| 1942 | Moontide | Henry Hirota | |
| 1942 | The Tuttles of Tahiti | Emily's servant | Uncredited |
| 1942 | Escape from Hong Kong | Tamoto | |
| 1942 | Submarine Raider | Yoshiwara | Uncredited |
| 1942 | Busses Roar | Yamanito | |
| 1942 | Across the Pacific | Captain Higoto | |
| 1942 | Flying Tigers | Mike the Mechanic | |
| 1942 | Heart of the Golden West | Chinese Cook | Uncredited |
| 1942 | China Girl | Japanese Officer | Uncredited |
| 1943 | The Amazing Mrs. Holliday | Young Farmer | Uncredited |
| 1943 | China | Japanese General | |
| 1943 | Crash Dive | Lee Wong | Uncredited |
| 1943 | Salute to the Marines | Japanese Officer | Uncredited |
| 1959 | Blood Alley | Ferry Boat Captain | Uncredited |
