= Eddie Lee =

American character actor (1899–1979)

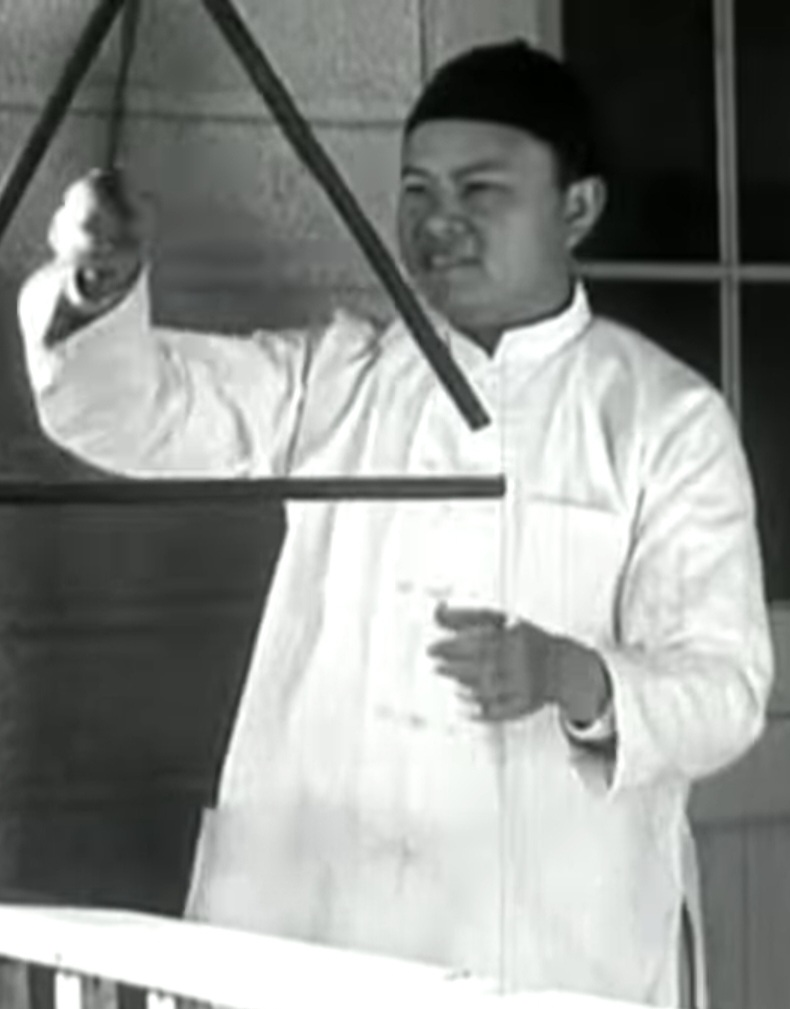
- Lee in Sunset Range (1935)
- Born: July 28, 1899; Los Angeles, California, U.S.
- Died: August 20, 1979 (aged 80); Los Angeles, California, U.S.
- Occupation: Character actor
- Years active: 1932–1955

Eddie Lee (July 28, 1899 – August 20, 1979) was a character actor from the 1930s through the 1950s. Of Asian descent, he played mainly bit parts such as cooks and soldiers. While most of his over 80 roles were uncredited, he did have a few significant roles, such as in 1935's Sunset Range, Panic on the Air (1936), and 1943's The Man From Thunder River.

== Filmography ==
(Per AFI database)

- I'll Cry Tomorrow (1955) as Chinese Grocer
- Soldier of Fortune (1955) as Sentry
- Hell and High Water (1953) as Chinese Submarine Commander
- China Venture (1953) as Guerrilla
- Target Hong Kong (1953) as Pirate
- I Was an American Spy (1951) as Japanese MP
- Mask of the Dragon (1951) as Chin Koo - Korean Curio Shop Owner
- Mister 880 (1950) as Chinese Interpreter
- Bells of Coronado (1949) as Shanghai, the Cook
- Malaya (1949) as Japanese Aide
- The Clay Pigeon (1949) as White Lotus Cashier
- Boston Blackie's Chinese Venture (1948) as Fantan Player
- Half Past Midnight (1948) as Chinese Man in Alley
- To the Ends of the Earth (1947) as Chian Soo
- Saigon (1947) as Teahouse Merchant
- Singapore (1946) as Waiter
- Calcutta (1946) as Jim Wong, Bank Clerk
- Frontier Gal (1945) as Wing Lee
- Nob Hill (1945) as Chinese Man
- God Is My Co-Pilot (1944) as Kichiburo's Staff Officer
- Dragon Seed (1944) as City Man
- Marine Raiders (1944) as Japanese Officer
- And the Angels Sing (1944) as Manager of Chinese Café
- Broadway Rhythm (1944) as Chinese Waiter
- The Purple Heart (1943) as Army Aide
- Rookies in Burma (1943) as Japanese Radio Operato
- Destination Tokyo (1943) as Japanese at Listening Post
- Jack London (1943) as Japanese Sergeant
- Headin' for God's Country (1943) as Gim Lung
- Salute to the Marines (1943) as Japanese Officer
- Behind the Rising Sun (1943) as Sergeant
- The Man from Thunder River (1943) as Wong
- China (1943) as Guerrilla
- Reunion in France (1942) as Japanese Man
- China Girl (1942) as Doctor
- Across the Pacific (1942) as Chinese Hotel Clerk
- Submarine Raider (1942) as Takeo
- Tarzan's New York Adventure (1942) as Sun Lee's Assistant
- Pacific Rendezvous (1942) as Japanese Man
- A Tragedy at Midnight (1942) as Chinese Laundry Worker
- A Yank on the Burma Road (1942) as Chinese Lieutenant
- Man from Cheyenne (1941) as Houseboy
- Moonlight in Hawaii (1941) as Charlie
- Burma Convoy (1941) as Leon
- The Stork Pays Off (1941) as Chinese Man
- The Big Store (1941) as Chinese Father
- Girls Under 21 (1940) as Chinese Waiter
- Barricade (1939) as Wah - Consulate Servant
- Torchy Blane in Chinatown (1938) as Chinese Boy
- Too Hot to Handle (1938) as Chinese Officer
- International Settlement (1938) as Rickshaw Driver
- West of Shanghai (1936) as Wang Chung - the Assassin
- The Cowboy and the Kid (1936) as Chinese Laundryman
- Roaming Lady (1936) as Chinese Seaman
- Panic on the Air (1936) as McNulty
- Charlie Chan in Shanghai (1935) as Servant
- Without Regret (1935) as Chinese Officer
- Here Comes Cookie (1935) as Chang
- Mary Jane's Pa (1935) as Chinese Man
- Sunset Range (1935) as Lee Fong the Cook
- George White's 1935 Scandals (1935) as Chinese Man
- The Painted Veil (1934) as Fane's Chinese Servant
- She Learned About Sailors (1933) as Rickshaw Driver
