= Victor Wong (actor, born 1906) =

American actor

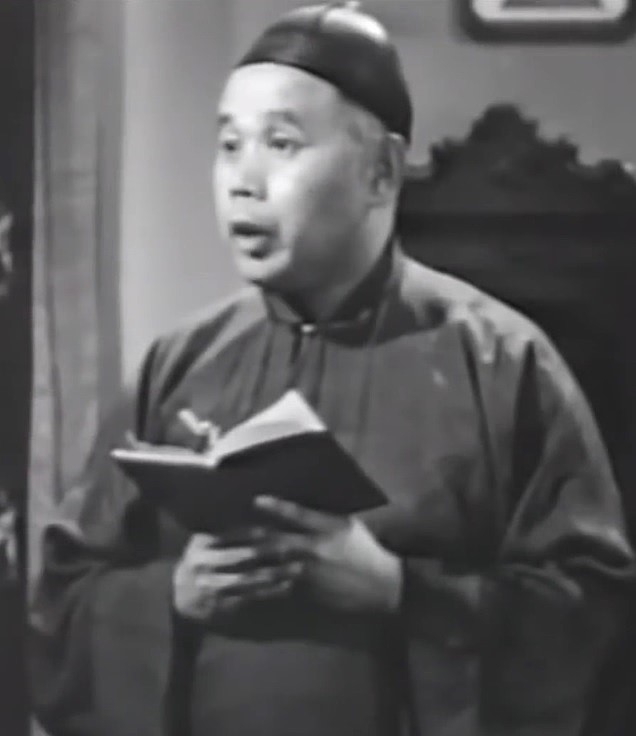
- Born: September 24, 1906; Los Angeles, California, U.S.
- Died: April 7, 1972 (aged 65); Los Angeles, California, U.S.
- Years active: 1932–1945

Victor Wong (September 24, 1906 – April 7, 1972) was a Chinese American actor. While Wong appeared in numerous films through the 1930s and 1940s, they were largely small uncredited parts. His memorable role was as Charlie the Cook in the movies King Kong (1933) and Son of Kong (1933). Wong's most memorable scene came in the original film when he finds evidence that natives have kidnapped Ann Darrow. He yells, "All hands on deck! Everybody on deck!" This causes panic aboard ship which begins the quest for Ann's whereabouts. The Charlie character in the sequel was more prominent to the story and included significantly more screen time for Wong. The character has since been criticized for being a racist stereotype, particularly for his exclamation of "Crazy black man been here!". He died of natural causes in 1972.

== Filmography ==
- Shanghai Express (1932) - Chinese Officer (uncredited)
- War Correspondent (1932) - Wu Sun
- King Kong (1933) - Charlie the Chinese Cook (uncredited)
- White Woman (1933) - Waiter (uncredited)
- Son of Kong (1933) - Charlie - Chinese Cook
- Vagabond Lady (1935) - Japanese Fisherman (uncredited)
- Without Regret (1935) - Soldier (uncredited)
- The Leathernecks Have Landed (1936) - Cheng (uncredited)
- Hair-Trigger Casey (1936) - Lee Fin - Karney's Enemy
- Brilliant Marriage (1936) - Wong
- Shadow of Chinatown (1936) - Bystander [Ch. 2] (uncredited)
- Lost Horizon (1937) - Bandit Leader (uncredited)
- Waikiki Wedding (1937) - Gardener (uncredited)
- Dangerous Holiday (1937) - Charlie, Chinese Boy (uncredited)
- Thank You, Mr. Moto (1937) - Street Peddler (uncredited)
- The Beloved Brat (1938) - Gardener (uncredited)
- The Fighting Devil Dogs (1938) - Mikichan (uncredited)
- Shadows Over Shanghai (1938) - Wu Chang
- Too Hot to Handle (1938)
- North of Shanghai (1939) - Cop
- Second Fiddle (1939) - Chinese Radio Broadcaster (uncredited)
- Mr. Moto Takes a Vacation (1939) - Restaurant Proprietor (uncredited)
- The Taming of the West (1939) - Cholly Wong
- Barricade (1939) - Second Bandit (uncredited)
- Phantom of Chinatown (1940) - Charley Won (uncredited)
- No, No, Nanette (1940) - John, Tom's Houseboy (uncredited)
- The Phantom Submarine (1940) - Willie Ming
- Passage from Hong Kong (1941) - Rickshaw Driver (uncredited)
- A Yank on the Burma Road (1942) - Chinese Man at Bridge (uncredited)
- Remember Pearl Harbor (1942) - Japanese Junior Officer (uncredited)
- Wake Island (1942) - Japanese Commander (uncredited)
- Flying Tigers (1942) - Chinese Passenger (uncredited)
- Destination Unknown (1942) - Trainman (uncredited)
- The Adventures of Smilin' Jack (1943) - Radio Operator in Hong Kong [Chs. 5-6] (uncredited)
- Mission to Moscow (1943) - Japanese Diplomat (uncredited)
- Dragon Seed (1944) - Japanese Officer (uncredited)
- Betrayal from the East (1945) - Joe (uncredited) (final film role)
