= Luke Chan =

Canadian actor

- Born: Luke Tin Chan; April 16, 1896; Victoria, British Columbia, Canada
- Died: September 30, 1983 (aged 87); Los Angeles, California, USA
- Education: Columbia University
- Occupation: Actor
- Spouse: Mary Vanvliet (m. 1936)

Luke Chan (April 16, 1896-September 30, 1983) was a Canadian character actor and designer who worked in Hollywood in the 1930s and 1940s. He was also a prominent figure in the development of Los Angeles's Chinatown neighborhood.

== Biography ==
Chan was born in Victoria, British Columbia, Canada, to parents of Chinese origin. His father, Chan Yu Tan, was a minister and his mother was a doctor.

Chan graduated from Columbia University, and later married Mary Alice Van Vleet in 1936; she died several years later. He was known for his intellectual manner, and he struck up an enduring friendship with actress Elissa Landi. Like a lot of Chinese actors during this period, he often played Japanese roles.

Chan opened the Chinese Junk Cafe in Los Angeles's Chinatown in the late 1930s. He and fellow actor Johnson Sing spent time designing a large replica of a Chinese pirate ship that adorned the restaurant at 733 N. Main St. (The building later burned down in a fire.) Chan also served as president of the neighborhood's China City Merchants' Association and as Chinatown's unofficial mayor, and helped design the look of the area.

== Selected filmography ==
- Saigon (1948)
- Singapore (1947)
- Ladies' Man (1947)
- The Show-Off (1946)
- The Well Groomed Bride (1946)
- Secret Agent X-9 (1945)
- God Is My Co-Pilot (1945)
- Thirty Seconds Over Tokyo (1944)
- Dragon Seed (1944)
- The Chinese Cat (1944)
- The Story of Dr. Wassell (1944)
- The Purple Heart (1944)
- The Man from Down Under (1943)
- Behind the Rising Sun (1943)
- Night Plane from Chungking (1943)
- Mission to Moscow (1943)
- The Adventures of Smilin' Jack (1943)
- Destination Unknown (1942)
- Somewhere I'll Find You (1942)
- Wake Island (1942)
- Submarine Raider (1942)
- Remember Pearl Harbor (1942)
- A Yank on the Burma Road (1942)
- They Met in Bombay (1941)
- The Real Glory (1939)
- Too Hot to Handle (1938)
- West of Shanghai (1937)
- Roaming Lady (1936)
- Charlie Chan in Shanghai (1935)
- Without Regret (1935)
- The Mysterious Mr. Wong (1934)
- Now and Forever (1934)
- The Secrets of Wu Sin (1932)
- War Correspondent (1932)
