= Sleepy Lagoon =

Sleepy Lagoon may refer to:

- "Sleepy Lagoon" (song), a 1930 light orchestral music written by Eric Coates and adapted into a song by Jack Lawrence, used as a theme in Desert Island Discs radio series
- The 1942 Sleepy Lagoon murder, which led to the Zoot Suit riots
- Sleepy Lagoon (film), a 1943 American musical comedy film
