= Kitty McHugh =

American actress (1906–1954)

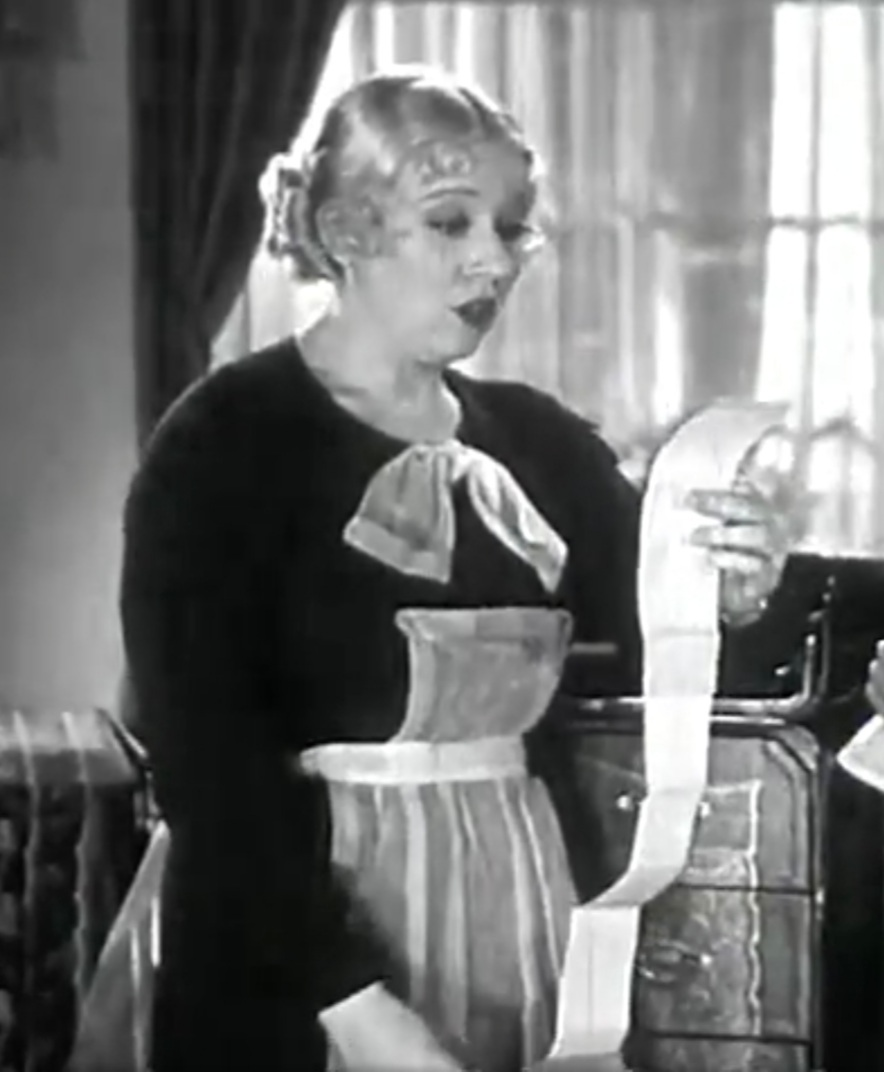
- McHugh in Sunset Range (1935)
- Born: Katherine McHugh; October 3, 1902; Harmony, Pennsylvania, U.S.
- Died: September 3, 1954 (aged 51); North Hollywood, California, U.S.
- Occupation: Actress
- Years active: 1934–1953
- Spouse: Ned Glass (m. 1935)

Kitty McHugh (born Katherine McHugh; October 3, 1902 – September 3, 1954) was an American actress. She appeared in more than 50 films between 1934 and 1953.

== Early years ==
McHugh was the daughter of Mr. and Mrs. Ed McHugh. She had three brothers, Frank, Matt, and Ed, Jr., and the six formed a family vaudeville comedy act.

== Career ==
When she was 4 years old, McHugh starred in a theatrical production of Little Lord Fauntleroy. She went on to act on stage as an adult, including work with the Actors Lab company on the Pacific coast.

McHugh appeared in the Three Stooges short subjects Hoi Polloi, Listen, Judge, and Gents in a Jam. It was in the latter film that she portrayed Mrs. McGruder, the Stooges' irate landlady who delivers the trio a triple slap and a right hook to wrestler Rocky Duggan (Mickey Simpson).

McHugh toured the European theatre of World War II performing in an Actors' Laboratory Theatre production of Three Men on a Horse.

== Personal life ==
McHugh committed suicide by taking an overdose of pills on September 3, 1954. She was married to character actor Ned Glass until her death.

== Partial filmography ==
- I've Got Your Number (1934) - Telephone Operator (uncredited)
- Registered Nurse (1934) - Switchboard Operator (uncredited)
- Sunset Range (1935) - Della (the Maid)
- Hoi Polloi (1935) - Duchess (uncredited)
- Hot Tip (1935) - Queenie
- Follow the Fleet (1936) - Minor Role (uncredited)
- Absolute Quiet (1936) - Florine, Axton's Secretary (uncredited)
- Three Cheers for Love (1936) - Wardrobe Mistress
- Women Are Trouble (1936) - Della Murty
- The Longest Night (1936) - Midge Riley, a Salesgirl
- The Accusing Finger (1936) - Waiter's Wife (uncredited)
- Oh, Doctor (1937) - Nurse (uncredited)
- Make Way for Tomorrow (1937) - Head Usherette (uncredited)
- On Again-Off Again (1937) - Miss Parker
- Blonde Trouble (1937) - Goldie Foster
- Youth on Parole (1937) - Salesgirl (uncredited)
- My Old Kentucky Home (1938) - Peggy Price
- Double Danger (1938) - Nurse Agnes Smith (uncredited)
- Goodbye Broadway (1938) - Blonde (uncredited)
- Men with Wings (1938) - Nurse (uncredited)
- Letter of Introduction (1938) - Girl Singer (uncredited)
- Orphans of the Street (1938) - (uncredited)
- Broadway Serenade (1939) - Kitty - the Maid
- When Tomorrow Comes (1939) - Gladys, a Waitress (uncredited)
- Here I Am a Stranger (1939) - Patsy - Waitress (uncredited)
- Disputed Passage (1939) - Telephone Operator (uncredited)
- The Grapes of Wrath (1940) - Mae
- The House Across the Bay (1940) - Prisoner's Wife (uncredited)
- Ma! He's Making Eyes at Me (1940) - Brooklyn Girl (uncredited)
- Sailor's Lady (1940) - Proprietress (uncredited)
- Pier 13 (1940) - Mary - Waitress (uncredited)
- Young People (1940) - Vaudevillian (uncredited)
- Secret Evidence (1941) - Mazie
- The Cowboy and the Blonde (1941) - Wardrobe Woman (uncredited)
- The Magnificent Dope (1942) - Sadie (uncredited)
- Dixie Dugan (1943) - (uncredited)
- Slightly Dangerous (1943) - Salesgirl (uncredited)
- Sleepy Lagoon (1943) - Mrs. Small
- A Scream in the Dark (1943) - Maisie
- The Street with No Name (1948) - Waitress (uncredited)
- Miss Mink of 1949 (1949) - Mrs. Wiggins (uncredited)
- Tension (1949) - Agnes (uncredited)
- Listen, Judge (1952, Short) - Mrs. Henderson
- Gents in a Jam (1952, Short) - Mrs. McGruder, Landlady
- Come Back, Little Sheba (1952) - Pearl Stinson (uncredited)
- Jennifer (1953) - Landlady
