= Gents in a Jam =

1952 American short film by Edward Bernds

- Directed by: Edward Bernds
- Written by: Edward Bernds
- Produced by: Hugh McCollum
- Starring: Moe Howard; Larry Fine; Shemp Howard; Emil Sitka; Kitty McHugh; Dani Sue Nolan; Mickey Simpson
- Cinematography: Fayte Browne
- Edited by: Edwin Bryant
- Distributed by: Columbia Pictures
- Release date: July 4, 1952 (U.S.)
- Running time: 16:15
- Country: United States
- Language: English

Gents in a Jam is a 1952 short subject directed by Edward Bernds starring American slapstick comedy team The Three Stooges (Moe Howard, Larry Fine and Shemp Howard). It is the 141st entry in the series released by Columbia Pictures starring the comedians, who released 190 shorts for the studio between 1934 and 1959.

== Plot ==
The Stooges find themselves in a predicament when facing eviction from their landlady, Mrs. MacGruder, due to their inability to afford the rent. In an attempt to rectify the situation, they offer to repaint her apartment. Despite Mrs. MacGruder's warning about the expense of the furnishings, the Stooges inadvertently destroy her property in their clumsy efforts. However, their fortunes seem to change when Shemp receives news of his wealthy Uncle Phineas Bowman's impending visit, with Shemp as the sole heir to his $6 million fortune. Upon learning of Uncle Phineas's wealth, Mrs. MacGruder allows them to remain in the apartment.

As events unfold, Shemp encounters the attractive new neighbor, Mrs. Duggan, while preparing an Upside Down Cake. Through their conversation, Shemp learns that she is married to Rocky Duggan, a formidable strongman known for his prowess in tearing telephone books. A series of mishaps lead to the Stooges attempting to conceal Mrs. Duggin from Rocky, who becomes enraged upon discovering her in their apartment. However, Mrs. MacGruder intervenes, physically confronting Rocky and asserting her authority. Amidst the chaos, it is revealed that Uncle Phineas and Mrs. MacGruder share a romantic history, leading to their reconciliation and decision to marry.

Ultimately, the Stooges find themselves without an inheritance, and Rocky is left toothless after a confrontation with Mrs. MacGruder. As Rocky pursues the Stooges in retaliation, Uncle Phineas is inadvertently knocked down and kicked by Mrs. Duggan. Semi-conscious, Phineas receives a compassionate embrace from MacGruder, expressing his desire for a tranquil and undisturbed visit.

== Cast ==
=== Credited ===
- Moe Howard as Moe
- Larry Fine as Larry
- Shemp Howard as Shemp & Radio (voice)
- Emil Sitka as Phineas Bowman
- Kitty McHugh as Mrs. McGruder
- Dani Sue Nolan as Mrs. Duggan
- Mickey Simpson as Rocky Duggan

=== Uncredited ===
- Snub Pollard as Telegram messenger

== Production notes ==
Gents in a Jam was filmed on December 17–19, 1951. It was the last Stooge short directed by Edward Bernds, long considered the Stooges' finest director. Producer Hugh McCollum was discharged and, as a result, Bernds resigned out of loyalty to McCollum, leaving only director/short subject head Jules White to both produce and direct the Stooges' remaining Columbia comedies.

Gents in a Jam marks the final appearance of longtime actor Snub Pollard. The comedy actor appeared in many shorts of the Curly Howard era. This was his final appearance in the Shemp era.
