= Redheads on Parade =

1935 film by Norman Z. McLeod

- Directed by: Norman Z. McLeod
- Screenplay by: Don Hartman; Rian James
- Story by: Gertrude Purcell; Jay Gorney; Don Hartman
- Produced by: Jesse L. Lasky; Sol M. Wurtzel
- Starring: John Boles; Dixie Lee; Jack Haley; Raymond Walburn; Alan Dinehart; Patsy O'Connor
- Cinematography: Barney McGill; John F. Seitz
- Music by: Jay Gorney
- Production company: Fox Film Corporation
- Distributed by: 20th Century Fox
- Release date: August 30, 1935
- Running time: 78 minutes
- Country: United States
- Language: English

Redheads on Parade is a 1935 American musical film directed by Norman Z. McLeod and written by Don Hartman and Rian James. The film stars John Boles, Dixie Lee, Jack Haley, Raymond Walburn, Alan Dinehart and Patsy O'Connor. The film was released on August 30, 1935, by 20th Century Fox and produced by Fox Film Corporation.

== Plot ==
George Magnus, John Bruce and their publicity agent, Peter Mathews, attempt to make a new picture, Beauties on Parade, but halfway through filming, their backer goes bankrupt.

== Cast ==
- John Boles as John Bruce
- Dixie Lee as Ginger Blair
- Jack Haley as Peter Mathews
- Raymond Walburn as Augustus Twill
- Alan Dinehart as George Magnus
- Patsy O'Connor as Patsy Blair
- Herman Bing as Lionel Kunkel
- William Austin as Trelawney Redfern
- Wilbur Mack as Henry Johnson

== Reviews ==
"Hardly living up to the excellence of its title and exploitation possibilities, ‘Redheads on Parade’ is relegated to subsequent-run assignments by its weak and unexciting story. . . Interwoven with this is the love story affecting Boles and Dixie Lee, extremely muddled and placing Mrs. Bing almost solely in the role of a good listener except for a couple of songs. . . Picture doesn't contain an outstanding performance or moment, though each member of the cast contributes his best."
