= Limehouse Blues (film) =

1934 film by Alexander Hall

- Directed by: Alexander Hall
- Written by: Cyril Hume; Arthur Phillips; Grover Jones; Philip MacDonald
- Produced by: Arthur Hornblow Jr.
- Starring: George Raft; Jean Parker; Anna May Wong; Kent Taylor
- Cinematography: Harry Fischbeck
- Edited by: William Shea
- Music by: Sam Coslow; John Leipold
- Production company: Paramount Pictures
- Distributed by: Paramount Pictures
- Release date: December 11, 1934
- Running time: 63 minutes
- Country: United States
- Language: English

Limehouse Blues (also known as East End Chant) is a 1934 American crime film, directed by Alexander Hall. The film is set in the Limehouse district in the East End of London and its Chinatown. Among the stars of the film were George Raft and Anna May Wong. The film is named after the song "Limehouse Blues".

== Plot ==
The film starts in a riverfront slum in Limehouse. The Lily Gardens, a local club, is owned by Chinese-American immigrant Harry Young. Young uses the club as a center of operations for his lucrative smuggling operation. Young is a recent arrival in London, but he has managed to take over crime operations in his area. Rival criminal Pug Talbot is increasingly driven out of business. Talbot is enraged over the situation, and his anger causes him to abuse his own daughter, Toni. The girl has been raised to be a pickpocket and is under her father's control.

At one point, Toni is about to be arrested, and Young helps her out. She is grateful for his help and grows fond of him. Talbot alerts the police about one of Young's operations, in the hope of hurting his rival's business. Toni overhears the plan and warns Young in time. Young manages to evade the police. Talbot is furious at his treacherous daughter and beats her. Young finds out about the abuse and vows revenge against Talbot.

Young pretends that he wants to negotiate with Talbot, and invites him for a meeting at his apartment. Talbot accepts the offer, unaware that it is a trap. When Talbot arrives from the meeting, Young has him stabbed to death. The corpse is abandoned in the street. Young offers Toni a job at his organization as a "watchdog", in exchange for room and board. Toni takes the offer and gets hired.

Young has a Chinese lover, Tu Tuan, who is suspicious of his relationship with Toni. She believes her lover has fallen in love with the "white girl" and warns him against fruitlessly pursuing her. Worried that a jealous Tu Tuan might hurt Toni, Young removes the pickpocket from his operations. He gives Toni an allowance for her living expenses, which she sees as charity.

Away from her life of crime and with free time in her hands, Toni goes sight-seeing in London. She soon befriends pet-shop owner Eric Benton, and starts spending her afternoons with him. Toni and Benton fall in love. Toni starts thinking about getting a job to stop depending on Young financially.

Young prevents her from doing so, in fear of losing her. Tu Tuan finds out about Toni's love life and warns Young about it. Tu Tuan derides Young for his unrequited love for a white woman, before ending her own relationship with him.

Toni confesses her criminal past to Benton. Benton visits The Lily Gardens and asks for an appointment with Young. In response, Young makes arrangements to have Benton killed in a manner similar to Talbot. Young personally goes on a smuggling mission, and has Toni escort him. He is unaware the police are expecting him this time—the distraught Tu Tuan had betrayed him to the police, before committing suicide.

During the mission, Toni finds out about Young's plans to have Benton killed. She is terrified for the safety of her loved one. From her reaction, Young realizes that Toni really loves the other man. He decides to call off the murder plans, and tries to warn his hired assassins in time. He is pursued by the police while trying to reach them, and is mortally wounded by gunfire.

Young calls off the murder in time, and manages to clear Toni's name from any involvement in crime. He then dies because of his wounds. Due to Young's self-sacrifice, Toni and Benton are safe and free to further pursue their relationship.

== Cast ==
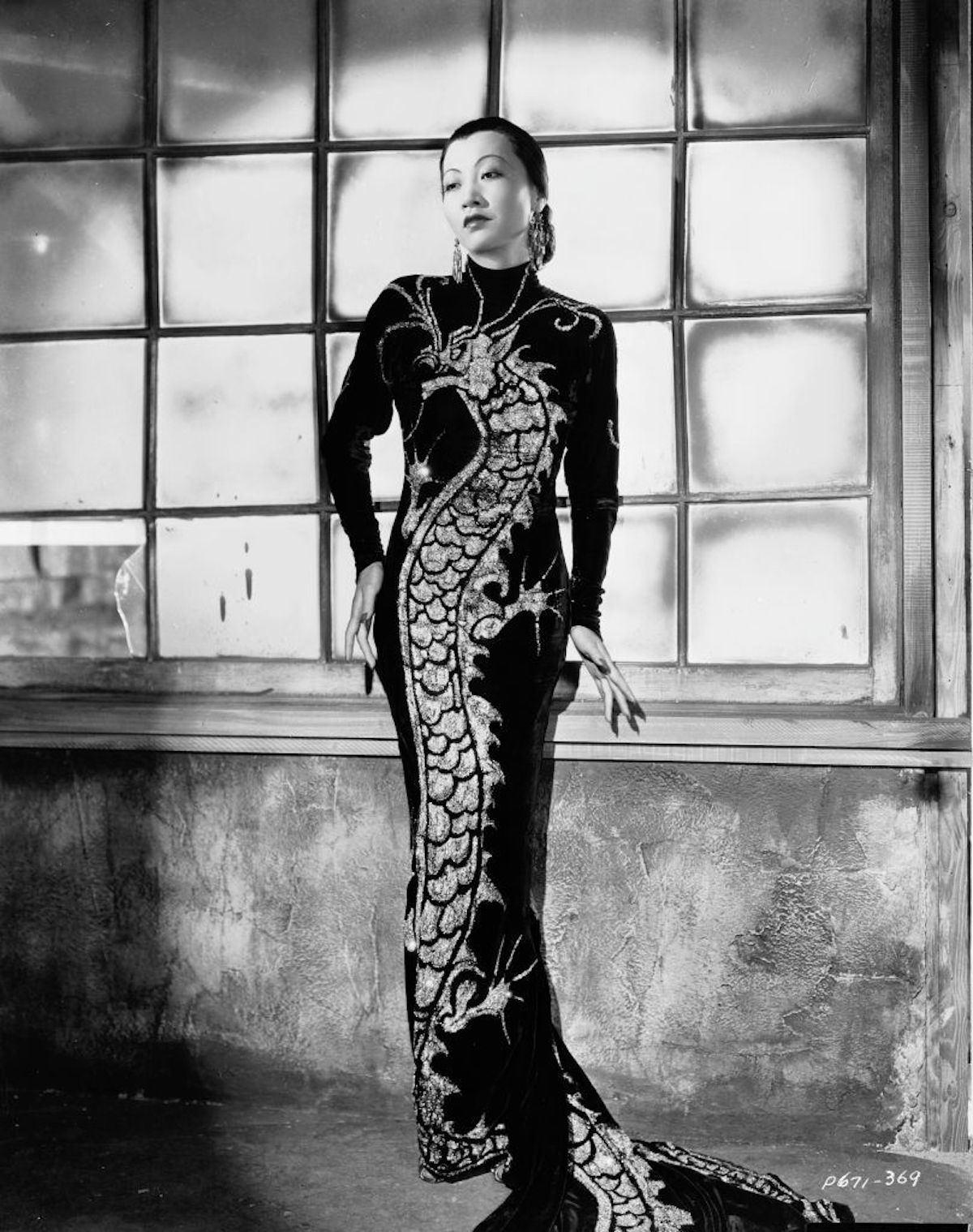
Anna May Wong in Limehouse Blues, gown by Travis Banton

- George Raft as Harry Young
- Jean Parker as Toni
- Anna May Wong as Tu Tuan
- Kent Taylor as Eric Benton
- Montagu Love as Pug Talbot
- Billy Bevan as Herb
- John Rogers as Smokey
- Robert Loraine as Inspector Sheridan
- E. Alyn Warren as Ching Lee
- Wyndham Standing as Assistant Commissioner Kenyon
- Louis Vincenot as Rhama
- Forrester Harvey as McDonald
- Tempe Pigott as Maggie
- Eric Blore as Slummer
- Robert Adair as Policeman
- Desmond Roberts as Constable
- Eily Malyon as Woman Who Finds Pug
- Colin Tapley as Man Fighting with Wife
- Otto Yamaoka as Chinese Waiter on Boat

== Production ==
=== Development ===
The working title of the film was Limehouse Nights, which was also the title of a book by Thomas Burke.

The role of Toni went through casting changes before filming begun. The role was originally intended for Sylvia Sidney, but she turned down offers to play in the film. Heather Angel was tested for the role, without getting hired. The role was eventually offered to Jean Parker. Parker was under contract with Metro-Goldwyn-Mayer at the time, and Paramount Pictures had to come to an agreement to get the actress "loaned" to them.

Anna May Wong was brought out from England to play an important role. Wong told the press the real Limehouse wasn't "fully Chinese it was more Asiatic."

George Raft wore yellowface.

=== Shooting ===
Filming took place in October 1934. According to news articles from the 1930s, some scenes of the film were filmed at the port of San Pedro, Los Angeles. The scenes were reportedly directed by William Shea, who is credited as the second unit director.

There are some contradictions in the credits of the film. The pressbook of the film mentions Grover Jones among the screenwriters, but not all sources agree. Idwal Jones also reportedly worked on the script.

Most sources credit the art direction of the film to Hans Dreier and Robert Usher. However, another source does not mention Usher's involvement. It credits the art direction to Hans Dreier and Roland Anderson.

The film reportedly includes genuine "oriental artwork" in its scenes. The pressbook reports that the artwork was provided by importer Tom Gubbins.

An early version of the script is preserved at the library files of the Academy of Motion Picture Arts and Sciences (AMPAS). It mention the role of "Ching Lee", which was intended for James Wing.

During filming the title was changed to Limehouse Blues.

== Reception ==
In a contemporary review in The New York Times, film critic Andre Sennwald described the film as a "clutching-hand melodrama," with Raft having "difficulty in persuading us that he is a gallant half-breed Chinaman who is the great scourge of Scotland Yard [...] he suffers from an unhappy habit of pronouncing his words like the dance-hall vaqueros of lower Broadway." The review also notes that the film "owns the most childlike scenario that the grown-up Broadway area has seen in many weeks and its chief virtue is to remind some of us novagenarians of the Yellow Peril literature of an earlier day." A review of the film in The Boston Globe reported that "as a half-caste [Raft] is able to look stolid and be right in the part," that "the story is exciting enough to appeal to the most thrill-loving members of the audience," and that "there is a brilliant supporting cast." In describing the film for The Chicago Tribune, Mae Tinée wrote that "the picture, as a whole, is about as enjoyable as the dark brown taste and the cold, gray dawn of a morning after [...] there is little to commend 'Limehouse Blues' save satisfactory acting."

The film was not a commercial success when first released.
