= Midnight Mary =

1933 film by William A. Wellman

- Directed by: William A. Wellman
- Written by: Anita Loos (story); Gene Markey; Kathryn Scola
- Produced by: Lucien Hubbard (assoc. producer)
- Starring: Loretta Young; Ricardo Cortez; Franchot Tone
- Cinematography: James Van Trees
- Edited by: William S. Gray
- Music by: William Axt
- Distributed by: Metro-Goldwyn-Mayer
- Release date: June 30, 1933
- Running time: 74 minutes
- Country: United States
- Language: English

Midnight Mary is a 1933 American pre-Code crime drama film directed by William A. Wellman and starring Loretta Young, Ricardo Cortez, and Franchot Tone.

== Plot ==
The story begins with an indifferent Mary Martin sitting in a courtroom on trial for murder. As the jury leaves to deliberate her fate, the story depicts flashbacks on Mary's hard life as a woman living in a large city of the 1930s as well as on the two lusty men—a gangster, Leo Darcy, and a lawyer, Tom Mannering, Jr.—with whom she is involved.

== Cast ==
- Loretta Young as Mary Martin ("Midnight Mary")
- Ricardo Cortez as Leo Darcy
- Franchot Tone as Tom Mannering, Jr.
- Andy Devine as Sam Travers
- Una Merkel as Bunny
- Frank Conroy as the District Attorney
- Warren Hymer as Angelo Ricci
- Ivan F. Simpson as Tindle (credited as Ivan Simpson)
- Harold Huber as 'Puggy' Nestle
- Sandy Roth as Blimp
- Martha Sleeper as Barbara Loring Mannering
- Charley Grapewin as Clerk (credited as Charles Grapewin)
- Halliwell Hobbes as Churchill
- Robert Emmett O'Connor as Charlie, the Cop
- Ernie Adams as Court Photographer
- Reginald Barlow as Trial Judge
- Louise Beavers as Anna, Mary's Maid
- Lynton Brent as Court Photographer
- Don Brodie as Court Photographer
- Mike Donlin as Guard at Club Imperial
- Robert Dudley as Mannering's Night Watchman
- Bill Elliott as Party Guest
- Robert Greig as Potter - Tom's Butler
- Wilfred Lucas as Nightclub Bouncer
- Philo McCullough as Masher
- Nelson McDowell as Salvation Army Leader
- Miki Morita as Chinese Restaurant Owner
- Bob Perry as Head Waiter at Club Saraband
- Lee Phelps as Club Imperial Floor Manager
- Charles Sellon as Night Watchman
- Phillips Smalley as Defense Attorney
- Richard Tucker as Club Imperial Manager
- Otto Yamaoka as Chinese Proprietor

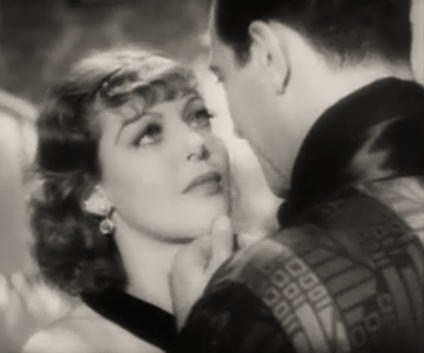
Young and Cortez in trailer from Midnight Mary
