= Otto Yamaoka =

American actor

- Born: Otto Han Yamaoka; April 25, 1904; Seattle, Washington, USA
- Died: June 5, 1967 (aged 63); New York, New York, USA
- Spouse: Irene
- Parents: Ototaka Yamaoka (father); Jho Watanabe (mother)
- Relatives: Iris Yamaoka (sister); George Yamaoka (brother)

Otto Yamaoka (April 25, 1904 – June 5, 1967) was an American actor and businessman who worked in Hollywood primarily during the 1930s. He was one of only a handful of Japanese-descended actors working in the industry at the time. His sister, Iris, was an actress too.

== Biography ==
Otto was born in Seattle, Washington, to Ototaka Yamaoka and Jho Watanabe.

The family moved to Los Angeles in the 1920s, and he and his sister Iris both developed an interest in acting; both primarily played smaller roles. His brother, George Yamaoka, became a prominent lawyer.

Otto's career in Hollywood ended around 1940, and he then began working as an importer in the Los Angeles area. The Yamaoka family was sent to the Heart Mountain internment camp in Wyoming during World War II following the signing of Executive Order 9066.

== Partial filmography ==
- The Ship from Shanghai (1930) - Shanghai Nightclub Patron (uncredited)
- The Benson Murder Case (1930) - Sam (uncredited)
- The Hot Heiress (1931) - Chinese Waiter (uncredited)
- The Black Camel (1931) - Kashimo
- The Hatchet Man (1932) - Chung Ho (uncredited)
- Westward Passage (1932) - Chong (uncredited)
- War Correspondent (1932) - Bandit (uncredited)
- The Racing Strain (1932) - Togo
- Midnight Mary (1933) - Chinese Proprietor (uncredited)
- Morning Glory (1933) - Servant (uncredited)
- Before Midnight (1933) - Kono
- The Sin of Nora Moran (1933) - Kito - John Grant's Houseboy (uncredited)
- We're Rich Again (1934) - Fugi
- Student Tour (1934) - Casino Patron (uncredited)
- Limehouse Blues (1934) - Chinese Waiter on Boat (uncredited)
- Death Flies East (1935) - Japanese Chauffeur (uncredited)
- The Wedding Night (1935) - Taka (uncredited)
- The Affair of Susan (1935) - Spieler (uncredited)
- Petticoat Fever (1936) - Kimo
- Rhythm on the Range (1936) - Chinese Houseboy (uncredited)
- Hollywood Boulevard (1936) - Thomas (uncredited)
- Libeled Lady (1936) - Ching
- Easy to Take (1936) - Japanese Instructor (uncredited)
- Night Waitress (1936) - Fong
- Criminal Lawyer (1937) - Mitzu - Brandon's House Boy (uncredited)
- Thin Ice (1937) - Japanese Reporter (uncredited)
- Song of the City (1937) - Wilbur - Paul's Butler (uncredited)
- Stand-In (1937) - Quintain's Houseboy (uncredited)
- Next Time I Marry (1938) - Joe - Nancy's Butler (uncredited)
- Trouble in Sundown (1939) - Foo Yung
- Two Girls on Broadway (1940) - Ito
- The Letter (1940) - Bartender at Party (uncredited) (final film role)
