= Paul Sutton =

American actor (1920–1970)

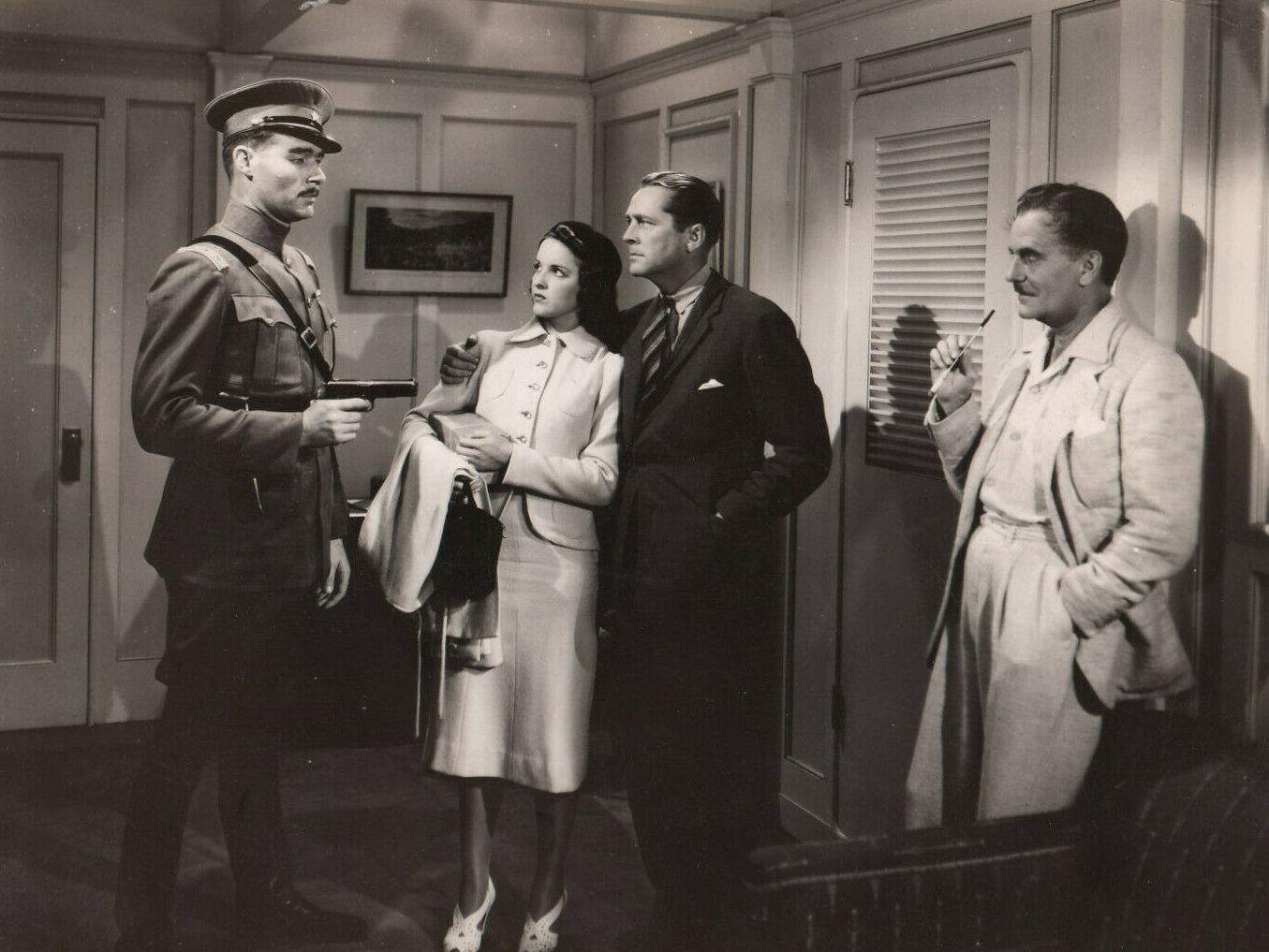
- Still from Shadows Over Shanghai (1938) with Sutton at left
- Born: May 14, 1910; Albuquerque, New Mexico, U.S.
- Died: January 31, 1970 (aged 59); Ferndale, Michigan, U.S.
- Occupation: actor
- Years active: 1936–1945

Paul Sutton (May 14, 1910 – January 31, 1970) was an American radio writer and actor who also acted in film.

== Biography ==
He was born in Albuquerque, New Mexico.

He is perhaps best known as one of the actors who portrayed Sergeant William Preston on the radio serial Challenge of the Yukon. He has been credited with creating Challenge of the Yukon and writing episodes of The Green Hornet. He collaborated on The Life of Mary Sothern, a 13-week serial on WMCA and WLW in 1938. As of July 26, 1938, he was at WXYZ in Detroit.

In film, he appeared in westerns and low budget B-movies during the 1930s and 1940s, sometimes in uncredited roles. He was in The Pinto Kid; a Variety review stated that "As the menace, Paul Sutton is one of the more convincing types." About his performance in North of the Yukon, Variety wrote, "Paul Sutton lends realism to the fable with his characterization of the husky French trapper." He was in the Hopalong Cassidy films In Old Mexico and Bar 20 Justice; a Variety review called him "miscast" in his role of villain in the latter.

He married Margaret Schwamm, a secretary to the general manager at the radio station at which he worked, on April 27, 1945.

He departed his acting career in 1947, and later entered politics. In 1954 and 1956 he ran for a seat in the United States House of Representatives from Michigan. He was residing in Ferndale, Michigan at the time of his death on January 31, 1970. He was survived by three children.

== Selected filmography ==
- Rio Grande Ranger (1936)
- Jungle Jim (1937)
- Under Strange Flags (1937)
- The Spy Ring (1938)
- Bar 20 Justice (1938)
- In Old Mexico (1938)
- Shadows Over Shanghai (1938)
- North of the Yukon (1939)
- The Pinto Kid (1941)
- The Great Awakening (1941)
- Wild Geese Calling (1941)
- Riders of the Northland (1942)
- Tombstone, the Town Too Tough to Die (1942)
