= Patsy O'Connor =

American actress and entertainer (1930–2017)

- Born: January 23, 1930; Bay Shore, New York, U.S.
- Died: July 4, 2017 (aged 87); New Jersey, U.S.
- Occupation: Actress
- Years active: 1935–1950

Patsy O'Connor (January 23, 1930 – July 4, 2017) was an American actress and entertainer who achieved fame as a young child for her vaudeville performances. She also performed on Broadway and in film.

== Early life ==
O'Connor was born in 1930 in Bay Shore, New York. Her parents were Mildred and John "Jack" O'Connor, members of "The O'Connor Family – Royal Family of Vaudeville".

The O'Connor family act was established in 1907 by her paternal grandparents, John Edward "Chuck" O'Connor who had been an acrobat with Ringling Bros. and Barnum and Bailey Circus and Effie Irene (née Crane) O'Connor who was a dancer and bareback rider in the circus. All four of their children joined the act, including Patsy's father and her uncle, actor and tap dancer Donald O'Connor. Chuck O'Connor died on stage from a heart attack in 1926 on and his daughter was killed by a car that same year, but the act continued to perform under the leadership of Effie O'Connor with her three sons and daughter-in-law.

The O'Connor family was friends with fellow vaudevillians Bud Abbott and Lou Costello.

== Career ==
O'Connor made her stage debut at three months of age alongside family members. She joined The Royal Family of Vaudeville act permanently at age two. When she was three, O'Connor performed at the Irish Village in A Century of Progress International Exposition, also known as the Chicago World's Fair of 1933–1934, alongside her parents, her grandmother, and her two uncles. Her young age, along with that of her nine-year-old uncle Donald, brought complaints from the Juvenile Protective Association of Chicago.

O'Connor started her film career in 1935, at age four, appearing in Redheads on Parade. She became known as a singer, dancer, and comedian. In 1936, she continued to perform with her family, singing, and dancing under the stage name "Baby Patsy". In 1940, she had a year-long contract with Columbia Pictures. She was part of a vaudeville tour through Canada with her family in 1941. That same year, she performed in her first Broadway show, the Cole Porter musical Panama Hattie. She replaced Joan Carroll in the role of Hattie and performed "Let's Be Buddies" with Ethel Merman.

In 1942 when she was eleven years old, O'Connor and Universal Studios entered into a long-term contract; this was facilitated by Abbott and Costello. She had a featured role in the film with the duo in It Ain't Hay, singing "Sunbeam Serenade" and "Old Timer".

In 1946, critics praised her singing in the vaudeville act; her performances included renditions of "Yes, My Darling Daughter", "My Buddy", and "Come Rain or Come Shine".

== Death ==
O'Connor died in New Jersey on July 4, 2017, of complications from Alzheimer's disease.

== Filmography ==
Following is a list of O'Connor's films, with the role.

- Redheads on Parade (1935) – Patsy Blair
- I Promise to Pay (1937) – Judy Lang
- Girl Loves Boy (1937) – Penny McCarthy
- Saratoga (1937) – Katie Hurley (uncredited)
- Too Hot to Handle (1938) – "Fake" Hulda Harding
- It Ain't Hay (1943) – Peggy / Princess O'Hara
- Mister Big (1943) – Genius' dancing partner (uncredited)
- You're a Lucky Fellow, Mr. Smith (1943) – Peggy Crandall
- Moonlight in Vermont (1943) – Alice
- Pardon My Rhythm (1944) – Doodles
- Patrick the Great (1945) – Member, Jivin' Jills (uncredited)
- Oil's Well That Ends Well (1949) – uncredited
- Quicksand (1950) – Millie
