= Burma Convoy =

1942 film by Noel M. Smith

- Directed by: Noel M. Smith
- Written by: Stanley Rubin; Roy Chanslor
- Produced by: Marshall Grant
- Starring: Charles Bickford; Evelyn Ankers; Frank Albertson; Cecil Kellaway
- Cinematography: John W. Boyle
- Edited by: Ted J. Kent
- Music by: Hans J. Salter
- Production company: Universal Pictures
- Distributed by: Universal Pictures
- Release date: October 6, 1941
- Running time: 67 minutes
- Country: United States
- Language: English

Burma Convoy is a 1941 American war film directed by Noel M. Smith and starring Charles Bickford, Evelyn Ankers and Frank Albertson. Produced and distributed by Universal Pictures as a second feature, it is about a truck convoy on the Burma Road. It was also known by the alternative title Halfway to Shanghai.

== Plot ==
In the Burmese town of Lashio, the convoys of an American transport company keep being attacked. Head driver is Cliff Weldon. His brother Mike comes to visit. They deal with a Eurasian spy, a Chinese agent and enemy attacks.

== Cast ==
- Charles Bickford as Cliff Weldon
- Evelyn Ankers as Ann McBragel
- Frank Albertson as Mike Weldon
- Cecil Kellaway as Angus McBragel
- Willie Fung as Smitty
- Keye Luke as Lin Taiyen
- Turhan Bey as Mr. Yuchau
- Truman Bradley as Victor Harrison
- Ken Christy as Hank
- C. Montague Shaw as Major Hart
- Harry Stubbs as Hubert
- Chester Gan as Keela
- Vyola Vonn as Mazie
- Eddie Lee as Leon
- Dorothy Vaughan as Mrs. Hubert
- Grace Lem as Mrs. Wong Lee
- Dave Thursby as Constable
- Duke York as Bartender
- Loo Loy as Rebel leader

== Production ==
The film was announced in April 1941 as Halfway to Shanghai. It was an early lead role for Evelyn Ankers who had joined the studio after being on stage in Ladies in Retirement. Filming took place in April and May 1941.

The film was one of a number being set in the Burma Road around this time, others including A Yank on the Burma Road, Burma Road and Over the Burma Road, with the latter two not being filmed.

== Reception ==
The New York Times thought the film was "too tame".
