= Mask of the Dragon =

1951 film

- Directed by: Sam Newfield
- Written by: Orville H. Hampton
- Produced by: Sigmund Neufeld
- Starring: Richard Travis; Sheila Ryan; Michael Whalen
- Cinematography: Jack Greenhalgh
- Edited by: Carl Pierson
- Music by: Bert Shefter; Dudley Chambers
- Production company: Sigmund Neufeld Productions
- Distributed by: Lippert Pictures; Exclusive Films (UK)
- Release date: March 10, 1951
- Running time: 53 minutes
- Country: United States
- Language: English

Mask of the Dragon is a 1951 American mystery thriller film directed by Sam Newfield and starring Richard Travis, Sheila Ryan and Michael Whalen. It was released by the independent company Lippert Pictures.

== Plot ==
An American army officer in South Korea agrees to deliver a jade dragon statuette to an address in Los Angeles. He is murdered soon after arriving in the city and his friend, private detective Phil Ramsey, investigates with the assistance of his girlfriend Ginny.

== Cast ==
- Richard Travis as Phil Ramsey
- Sheila Ryan as Ginny O'Donnell
- Sid Melton as Manchu Murphy
- Michael Whalen as Maj. Clinton
- Lyle Talbot as Lt. "Mack" McLaughlin
- Dee Tatum as Terry Newell
- Richard Emory as Army Lt. Daniel Oliver
- Jack Reitzen as Prof. Kim Ho
- Masura "Charles" Iwamoto as Simo
- Karl Davis as Kingpin
- Johnny Grant as Johnny Grant
- Carla Martin as Sarah
- Ray Singer as Grantland
- Eddie Lee as Chin Koo
- Margia Dean as Television Actress
