= I Promise to Pay =

1937 film

- Directed by: D. Ross Lederman
- Written by: Lionel Houser; Mary C. McCall Jr.
- Produced by: Myles Connolly
- Starring: Chester Morris
- Cinematography: Lucien Ballard
- Edited by: James Sweeney
- Music by: M. W. Stoloff
- Distributed by: Columbia Pictures
- Release date: April 21, 1937
- Running time: 68 minutes
- Country: United States
- Language: English

I Promise to Pay is a 1937 American drama film directed by D. Ross Lederman.

== Plot ==
Eddie Lang, a decent family man making $27.50 a week, borrows fifty-dollars from Richard Farra in order to take his wife, Mary and two small children on a vacation. He soon finds himself in the merciless clutches of Marra and his loan-shark gang. In desperation he tells his story to the district attorney, J.E.Curtis—only to be shot down on the steps of the Hall of Justice.

== Cast ==
- Chester Morris as Eddie Lang
- Leo Carrillo as Richard Farra
- Helen Mack as Mary Lang
- Thomas Mitchell as District Attorney J.E. Curtis
- Thurston Hall as Police Captain Hall
- John Gallaudet as Al Morton - aka Johnson
- Patsy O'Connor as Judy Lang
- Wallis Clark as B.G. Wilson
- James Flavin as Bill Seaver
- Edward Keane as Mike Reardon
- Harry Woods as Henchman Fats
- Henry Brandon as Henchman Fancyface
- Marc Lawrence as Henchman Whitehat
