= Charlie Chan in Honolulu =

1938 film by H. Bruce Humberstone

- Directed by: H. Bruce Humberstone
- Written by: Charles S. Belden
- Produced by: John Stone
- Starring: Sidney Toler; Phyllis Brooks; Victor Sen Yung
- Cinematography: Charles G. Clarke
- Edited by: Nick DeMaggio
- Music by: Samuel Kaylin
- Production company: 20th Century Fox
- Distributed by: 20th Century Fox
- Release date: January 13, 1939
- Running time: 67 minutes
- Country: United States
- Language: English

Charlie Chan in Honolulu is a 1939 American mystery film directed by H. Bruce Humberstone, starring Sidney Toler as the fictional Chinese-American detective Charlie Chan. The film is the first appearance of both Toler as Chan and Victor Sen Yung as "number two son" Jimmy.

== Plot ==
Detective Charlie Chan's daughter prepares to give birth to his first grandchild. While Chan waits at the hospital, his "number two" son Jimmy intercepts a message intended for Charlie about a murder aboard the freighter Susan B. Jennings.

The freighter is on its way from Shanghai to Honolulu under the command of Captain Johnson (Robert Barrat). Jimmy, wanting to prove his investigative skills, boards the ship pretending to be his father, with his younger brother Tommy (Layne Tom Jr.) in tow. The ruse doesn't last long and soon the real Chan arrives on board, interrogating a motley assortment of crooks, heiresses, and crew members as he works to solve a crime whose only witness is secretary Judy Hayes (Phyllis Brooks).

The suspects include the eccentric scholar Dr. Cardigan (George Zucco), who claims to have kept a human brain alive in formaldehyde for six months and is always looking for new subjects; Mrs. Carol Wayne (Claire Dodd), embroiled in a bitter divorce settlement involving $300,000 in stolen cash; and criminal Johnny McCoy (Marc Lawrence), who is being extradited to the United States in the custody of detective Joe Arnold (Richard Lane).

Captain Johnson is eager to unload his cargo, which is mostly a shipment of lions destined for the San Francisco Zoo. Deckhand Al Hogan is fond of walking his pet lion Oscar on the main deck, to nobody's pleasure.

Jimmy starts a fire on the ship, hoping to panic the killer in grabbing the hidden money and making a run for it. Chan's anger is cooled when Jimmy shoves him out of the way of an assassin's bullet. Chan recovers the gun and announces that the murderer will be revealed by the fingerprints on the gun. The lights go out for a few moments, and now the gun is gone. But while stealing the gun in darkness, the guilty party triggered an infra-red camera that identifies the culprit.

The story ends with the remaining passengers gathered around the ship-to-shore phone, listening to the coos and cries of Charlie Chan's first grandchild.

== Cast ==
- Sidney Toler as Charlie Chan
- Sen Yung as Jimmy Chan
- Phyllis Brooks as Judy Hayes
- Eddie Collins as Al Hogan
- John King as Randolph
- Claire Dodd as Mrs. Carol Wayne
- George Zucco as Dr. Cardigan
- Robert Barrat as Captain Johnson
- Marc Lawrence as Johnny McCoy
- Richard Lane as Joe Arnold
- Layne Tom Jr. as Tommy Chan
- Philip Ahn as Wing Foo, Chan's son-in-law
- Paul Harvey as Inspector Rawlins
- James Flavin as Homicide Desk Sergeant
- J. Anthony Hughes as Ship's Doctor
- Al Kikume as Officer Molokai
- James Pierce as Policeman
- Richard Alexander as Crew Member
- Constantine Romanoff as Crew Member
- Blue Washington as Crew Member
- Oscar the Lion

Rest of the Chan Family

- Barbara Jean Wong as Chan Daughter (uncredited)
- Allan Hoo as Chan Son
- Eugene Hoo as Chan Son
- Frances Hoo as Chan Daughter
- Hippie Hoo as Chan Son
- Florence Ung as Ling Chan
- Grace Lem as Mama Chan

== Critical reception ==
Producer Sol Wurtzel was testing Toler's appeal as Charlie Chan. Author Scott MacGillivray comments on Wurtzel's strategy: "It was actually a one-shot proposition, true to the Sol Wurtzel way of working. Wurtzel often introduced a new screen personality or character in a single picture; if it was accepted by audiences, the producer turned it into a series."

Sidney Toler's interpretation of the Chinese detective was very well received. Box Office Digest said "Charlie Chan is in safe hands. Charlie will go marching on to cheerful tunes in the person of Sidney Toler. It isn't an imitation Warner Oland characterization that Toler delivers, but it is a thoroughly satisfying, neatly shaded Charlie Chan." Independent Exhibitors Film Bulletin said "As for Toler, he does a superlative job. He has sensibly formulated his own characterization, a lighter, more affable and less formal Charlie Chan. We think audiences will accept him." Motion Picture Herald said "[The preview was] attended by top-ranking executives, the most sought-after reviewers and commentators, and invited guests... quite a few of these strangers to Chan went into ecstasies." Frank Nugent of The New York Times described the film as "practically a letter-perfect duplicate of all the other Chan films" and "the usual, red-herring scented, passably diverting mystery film," saying that Toler was "respectful of Mr. Oland's interpretation," and reported that the "comic relief, which isn't always, is Eddie Collins, who has the plastic face of an old burlesque comedian."
