= The Phantom Submarine (film) =

- Theatrical release poster
- Directed by: Charles Barton
- Screenplay by: Joseph Krumgold
- Based on: Ocean Gold by Augustus Muir
- Produced by: Ralph Cohn
- Starring: Anita Louise; Bruce Bennett; Oscar O'Shea; John Tyrrell; Pedro de Cordoba; Victor Wong
- Cinematography: Barney McGill
- Edited by: William Lyon
- Production company: Columbia Pictures
- Distributed by: Columbia Pictures
- Release date: December 20, 1940
- Running time: 70 minutes
- Country: United States
- Language: English

The Phantom Submarine is a 1940 American adventure film directed by Charles Barton and written by Joseph Krumgold. The film stars Anita Louise, Bruce Bennett, Oscar O'Shea, John Tyrrell, Pedro de Cordoba and Victor Wong. The film was released on December 20, 1940, by Columbia Pictures.

== Plot ==
Journalist and US Navy frogman investigate U-boat terror.

== Cast ==
- Anita Louise as Madeleine Neilson
- Bruce Bennett as Paul Sinclair
- Oscar O'Shea as Captain Velsar
- John Tyrrell as Dreaux
- Pedro de Cordoba as Henri Jerome
- Victor Wong as Willie Ming
- Charles McMurphy as 2nd Mate
- Harry Strang as Chief Engineer
- Don Beddoe as Bartlett
