= Layne Tom Jr. =

American actor

- Born: June 19, 1927; Los Angeles, California, U.S.
- Died: January 14, 2015 (aged 87); Huntington Beach, California, U.S.
- Occupation: Actor
- Years active: 1936–1945
- Spouse: Marilynn Chow
- Children: Kiana Tom; Laurie Tom

Layne Tom Jr. (born Richard Layne Tom, Jr.) (June 19, 1927 – January 14, 2015) was an American actor.

== Career ==
He holds the distinction of having played three different Charlie Chan sons: as Charlie Chan Jr. in Charlie Chan at the Olympics (1937), as Tommy Chan in Charlie Chan in Honolulu (1938), and in 1940's Charlie Chan's Murder Cruise as Willie Chan, Chan's number seven son.

He also appeared with child star Shirley Temple in Stowaway (1936) as an uncredited Chinese Boy in the Musical Band. He was credited as Mako with Dorothy Lamour, Jon Hall, and C. Aubrey Smith in The Hurricane (1937), and as an uncredited extra in San Francisco (1936) with stars Clark Gable, Jeanette MacDonald, and Spencer Tracy.

Tom attended John H. Francis Polytechnic High School in Los Angeles. After he got out of the Navy when World War II ended, he turned down a five-year movie contract with Monogram Pictures to attend the University of Southern California instead to become an architect. He designed the flagship Bank of America building in Los Angeles' Chinatown, as well as fire stations, banks, courthouses, libraries, shopping centers, civic centers.

Tom only returned to show business to film two documentaries about Charlie Chan: Layne Tom, Jr: The Adventures of Charlie Chan, Jr. and Legacy of Charlie Chan as himself.

== Personal life and death ==
Tom died in 2015 in his home in Huntington Beach, California, age 87.

His daughter Kiana Tom is a television host, star of Kiana's Flex Appeal fitness series and one of the most widely recognized fitness experts in the world.

== Filmography ==
Year	Title	Role	Notes
1936	Stowaway	Chinese Boy in Musical Band	Uncredited
1937	The Hurricane	Mako	
1937	Charlie Chan at the Olympics	Charlie Chan Jr.	
1937	The Good Earth	Chinese Boy	Uncredited
1937	Daughter of Shanghai aka Daughter of the Orient (UK)	Chinese Candy Vendor	Uncredited
1938	Shadows Over Shanghai	Chinese Boy at School	Uncredited
1938	Charlie Chan in Honolulu	Tommy Chan	
1939	Mr. Smith Goes to Washington	Boy Ranger	Uncredited
1940	Charlie Chan's Murder Cruise	Willie Chan	
1945	China Sky		Uncredited
2006	The Legacy of Charlie Chan	Himself	Video documentary short
2006	Layne Tom, Jr: The Adventures of Charlie Chan, Jr.	Himself	Video documentary short
