= War Correspondent (film) =

1932 film by Paul Sloane

- Film poster
- Directed by: Paul Sloane
- Written by: Keene Thompson (story); Jo Swerling (adaptation)
- Starring: Jack Holt; Ralph Graves; Lila Lee
- Cinematography: Benjamin H. Kline
- Edited by: Gene Havlick
- Production company: Columbia Pictures
- Distributed by: Columbia Pictures
- Release date: June 25, 1932
- Running time: 76 minutes
- Country: United States
- Language: English

War Correspondent is a 1932 American drama film directed by Paul Sloane. The film stars Jack Holt, Ralph Graves and Lila Lee. Although set in war-torn China, War Correspondent was entirely shot in California.

This film is not to be confused with Foreign Correspondent, a UA film by Alfred Hitchcock.

== Plot ==
Outside of Shanghai, famous war correspondent Franklyn Bennett, part of an unofficial branch of the U.S. military, broadcasts over the radio an eyewitness report of an air battle won by China's ace, "General Ching," flying for the nationalist forces of Wu Sun.

"General Ching" is Jim Kenyon, a cynical American soldier of fortune. Wu Sun presents Jim with the Order of the Golden Dragon, China's highest medal for defeating the forces of General Fang. The airman excuses himself to meet Julie March, a former prostitute.

When Julie's rickshaw is smashed by an automobile, the passenger is a former client. Franklyn rescues her and escorts her back to the Cathay Hotel. A short time later, he places a notice in The North China Times announcing his engagement to Julie, exaggerating her "rescue" from a "mob of howling coolies."

Jim is jealous, and during a party at the hotel, Jim denounces the reporter as a liar and coward. Jim orders Franklyn imprisoned, and creates a false statement saying that the journalist attacked him. Jim forces Franklyn to leave China within 24 hours or face a firing squad. Frank tells Julie that he really is a coward, but she implores him to take her with him.

That night, bandit leader General Fang's thugs kidnap Julie and when Franklyn learns of her capture, he pleads with Jim to rescue her. Jim flies his aircraft to Fang's headquarters but Fang, bitter that Jim had switched allegiances for money, wants to make a bargain for Julie's life.

Jim offers Franklyn but relents and kills Fang. The two men prop Fang's limp bodies between their own and flee to the nearby airfield. Franklyn and Julie drive away, while Jim takes to the sky and attacks the forces pursuing their car but is wounded by enemy fire.

After his aircraft crashes, Jim is comforted by Julie. Along with her husband, she places the Order of the Golden Dragon on the chest of their dead friend.

== Cast ==
- Jack Holt as Jim Kenyon
- Ralph Graves as Franklyn Bennett
- Lila Lee as Julie March
- Victor Wong as Wu Sun
- Tetsu Komai as Fang
- Luke Chan as Bandit
- Chester Gan as Bandit
- Richard Loo as Bandit
- William V. Mong as Man with Marked Shoe
- Miki Morita as Bandit
- James Wang as Bandit
- Otto Yamaoka as Bandit

== Production ==
Principal photography on War Correspondent began on May 31 with the production wrapped on June 25, 1932. The locales used were the Wilson Airport transformed into a military base, while other location shooting took place at the Dry Lake, 20 miles east of Victorville, California in the Mojave Desert. Roy and Tave Wilson were the stunt pilots hired for the film, flying Speedwing Travelairs. (Note: Stunt pilot Roy Wilson who was dubbing for Jack Holt was killed during the production.)

== Reception ==
Mordaunt Hall in his review for The New York Times, described War Correspondent as, "An amateurish melodrama revelling in the title of 'War Correspondent' is the present film feature at the Paramount. If it possesses anything interesting, it is Chinese atmosphere, but it would take a great deal more than this to make up for the absurdities in the story."
