= The Pinto Kid (1941 film) =

1941 film by Lambert Hillyer

- Directed by: Lambert Hillyer
- Written by: Fred Myton
- Produced by: Jack Fier
- Starring: Charles Starrett; Louise Currie; Bob Nolan
- Cinematography: George Meehan
- Edited by: Mel Thorsen
- Production company: Columbia Pictures
- Distributed by: Columbia Pictures
- Release date: February 5, 1941
- Running time: 61 minutes
- Country: United States
- Language: English

The Pinto Kid is a 1941 American Western film directed by Lambert Hillyer and starring Charles Starrett, Louise Currie and Bob Nolan. It was produced and distributed by Columbia Pictures.

== Cast ==
- Charles Starrett as Jud Calvert
- Louise Currie as Betty Ainsley
- Bob Nolan as Bob
- Paul Sutton as Vic Landreau
- Hank Bell as Hank
- Francis Walker as Curt Harvey
- Ernie Adams as Ed Slade
- Jack Rockwell as Marshal
- Roger Gray as Dan Foster
- Dick Botiller as Henchman Cheyenne
- Sons of the Pioneers as Musicians

== Bibliography ==
- Pitts, Michael R. Western Movies: A Guide to 5,105 Feature Films. McFarland, 2012.
