= In Old Mexico =

1938 movie

- Theatrical release poster
- Directed by: Edward D. Venturini
- Screenplay by: Harrison Jacobs
- Based on: Corson of the JC; 1927 novel by Clarence E. Mulford
- Produced by: Harry Sherman
- Starring: William Boyd; George "Gabby" Hayes; Russell Hayden; Paul Sutton; Al Ernest Garcia; Jan Clayton; Trevor Bardette
- Cinematography: Russell Harlan
- Edited by: Robert B. Warwick Jr.
- Music by: Gregory Stone
- Production company: Paramount Pictures
- Distributed by: Paramount Pictures
- Release date: September 9, 1938
- Running time: 67 minutes
- Country: United States
- Language: English

In Old Mexico is a 1938 American Western film directed by Edward D. Venturini and written by Harrison Jacobs. The film stars William Boyd, George "Gabby" Hayes, Russell Hayden, Paul Sutton, Al Ernest Garcia, Jan Clayton and Trevor Bardette. The film was released on September 9, 1938, by Paramount Pictures.

== Plot ==
Hoppy (William Boyd) and his pals must journey to Mexico after receiving a summons. Upon arrival, they realize that it was fake and that a good friend has been mysteriously murdered. They solve the puzzle with the assistance of the killer's feisty sister and a band of helpful caballeros.

== Cast ==
- William Boyd as Hopalong Cassidy
- George "Gabby" Hayes as Windy Halliday
- Russell Hayden as Lucky Jenkins
- Paul Sutton as The Fox
- Al Ernest Garcia as Don Carlos Gonzales
- Jan Clayton as Anita Gonzales
- Trevor Bardette as Rurales Colonel Gonzales
- Betty Amann as Janet Leeds
- Anna Demetrio as Elena
- Glenn Strange as Henchman Burke
- Tony Roux as Pancho
