= Shadows Over Shanghai =

1938 film by Charles Lamont

- Directed by: Charles Lamont
- Written by: Richard Sale (story); Joseph Hoffman (screenplay)
- Produced by: Charles Lamont (associate producer); Franklyn Warne (producer)
- Starring: James Dunn; Ralph Morgan; Robert Barrat; Paul Sutton
- Cinematography: Arthur Martinelli
- Edited by: Bernard Loftus
- Music by: Screen Music, Inc.
- Production company: Franklyn Warner Productions
- Distributed by: Grand National Pictures
- Release date: October 14, 1938
- Running time: 65 minutes
- Country: United States
- Language: English

Shadows Over Shanghai is a 1938 American drama film directed by Charles Lamont and starring James Dunn, Ralph Morgan, Robert Barrat, and Paul Sutton. Set in Shanghai during the Second Sino-Japanese War, the plot centers on the efforts of Japanese and Russian espionage agents to get their hands on an amulet which is the key to a $5 million fund meant to help China purchase munitions. Footage from the bombing of Shanghai during the 1937–1945 war was incorporated into several scenes.

== Plot ==
Russian agent Igor Sargoza shoots down Peter Roma's biplane over an orphanage in China where Roma's sister Irene teaches. Badly wounded, Peter entrusts Irene with a broken amulet that he needs to get to San Francisco; the other half is being held there, where the two halves will unlock $5 million to be used for the purchase of munitions for China to defend itself during the Second Sino-Japanese War. With Sargoza on her trail, Irene misses the last ship of the day evacuating foreigners and goes to see Howard Barclay, whom her brother says will help her. Barclay’s friend Johnny McGinty, an Irish-American photojournalist who also wants to leave Shanghai the next day, is asked to assist Irene. Since Irene lacks an American passport, Barclay suggests she and Johnny get married so she can be added to Johnny’s passport. They can annul the marriage when they reach San Francisco.

Johnny happily goes into his adjoining room to pack and is accosted by a gun-wielding Chinese man, who escorts him out into Sargoza’s car. At the border of the international zone, however, Japanese officers led by Fuji Yokohama stop the car and release Johnny. Yokohama warns Johnny to stay away from Irene and lets him go.

Johnny finds Barclay and Irene at the home of Wu Chang, a minister who performs the marriage ceremony. Back at the hotel, a wedding present, a Mandarin incense burner, is delivered from Lun Sat Li, a friend of Johnny's. Unbeknownst to them, the courier was waylaid and an explosive device planted inside. Barclay suggests they hide the amulet in the incense burner. Suddenly, Japanese bombers invade the city. As the bombing continues, the three escape the city to the home of Lun Sat Li. Sargoza and his men barge into the house and the three escape in a power launch through a trap door in the floor. They receive permission to board the ship that will evacuate American citizens in the morning.

Entering their stateroom, they find Yokohama waiting for them, demanding the amulet. He grabs the box from Irene and prepares to open it when Sargoza appears. Sargoza takes the incense burner from Yokohama and locks the four in a room while he lights a match to melt the candle and retrieve the amulet. The incense burner explodes, killing Sargoza. Yokohama then explains to the others that he was the one who had planned the interception of the gift and the planting of the bomb. Yokohama also tells Johnny that Barclay is a Chinese agent who was empowered to purchase munitions with the funds waiting in San Francisco. However, now that President Roosevelt has declared an embargo on government shipments to nations at war, the funds cannot be used for that purpose. Barclay bids goodbye to Johnny and Irene and slips the amulet—which he never placed in the incense burner—into Irene's hand. Johnny and Irene make plans to sail for San Francisco and stay married for real.

== Cast ==
- James Dunn as Johnny McGinty
- Ralph Morgan as Howard Barclay
- Linda Grey as Irene Roma
- Robert Barrat as Igor Sargoza
- Paul Sutton as Fuji Yokahama
- Edward Woods as Peter Roma
- Edwin Mordant as Dr. Adams
- Chester Gan as Lun Sat Li
- Victor Wong as Wu Chang
- Edward Keane as American Consul
- Billy Bevan as Gallicuddy, the bartender
- William Haade as Captain Murphy
- Richard Loo as Fong
- Victor Sen Yung as Wang (billed as Victor Young)
- Layne Tom Jr. as Chinese boy at school (uncredited)

== Production ==
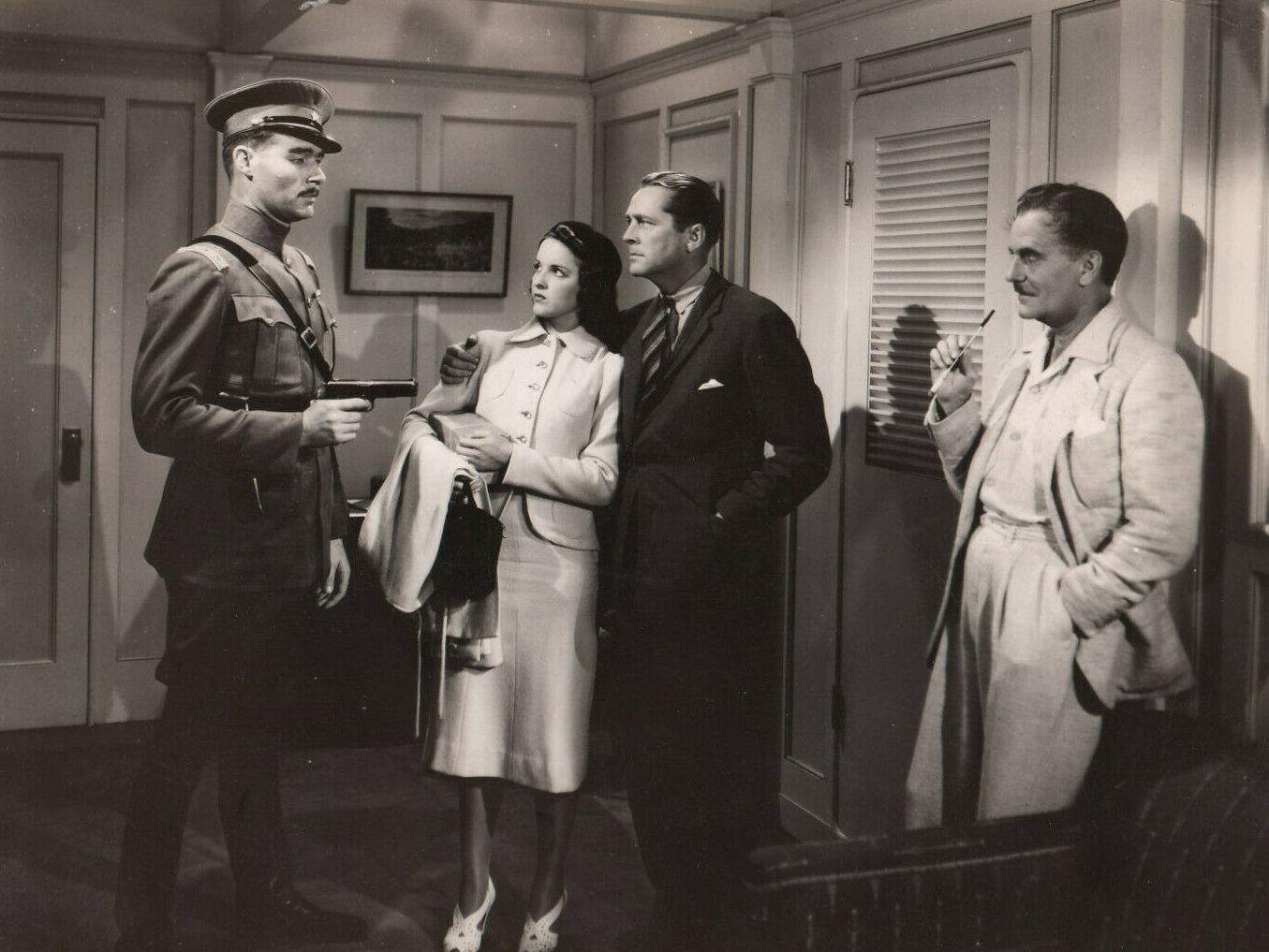
(L. to r.) Paul Sutton, Linda Grey, James Dunn, and Ralph Morgan in a scene from the film

=== Development ===
Shadows Over Shanghai was based on an original story by Richard B. Sale; the screenplay was written by Joseph Hoffman. The film was produced under the working titles of Shadows over China, Shadows over China Seas, and Thunder over China.

=== Casting ===
This was the first leading role for actress Linda Grey, who had previously performed in stock theatre in the Midwestern United States.

=== Filming ===
Filming began in mid-July 1938. Footage from the bombing of Shanghai during the Second Sino-Japanese War of 1937–1945 was incorporated into several scenes.

== Release ==
Shadows Over Shanghai was released on October 14, 1938. It was the first production by Fine Arts Pictures to be released under the auspices of Grand National Pictures.

== Critical reception ==
Contemporary critics cited James Dunn's engaging personality and the footage of aerial bombing from the Second Sino-Japanese War as the film's highlights. The New York Daily News, which gave the film 2 ½ stars, complimented Dunn's "particular brand of engaging nonchalance and smart talk", and said Linda Grey was "a pretty foil for James Dunn's clowning". The Brooklyn Daily Eagle similarly noted that Dunn had his "usual sparkling personality". Davenport Daily Times called Dunn "half of the show", adding that the film "would be relegated to second place fare without the carefree James Dunn and the best bombing photography of the Sino-Japanese war yet to be shown here". The StarPhoenix, however, called the plot "pretty standard stuff", and said that "Jimmy Dunn tries desperately to be facetious under the strain of war". The Morning Herald reserved praise for Paul Sutton, who in appearance and demeanor plays a scheming Japanese officer.

A modern review in TV Guide gave the film one out of four stars, criticizing the production as "confusing and uneven ... it is hard to figure out what is going on". This review also decried the use of stock footage from the Sino-Japanese War, and called some of the comedy "very unfitting".

McLaughlin and Parry note that Shadows Over Shanghai was part of a trend in 1930s Hollywood productions which "at least indirectly sympathized with the victims of fascism and criticized to a lesser or greater degree the aggressors. This is most clearly seen in the films that depict the Chinese as victims of Japan". The film follows this approach by presenting scenes of the Japanese bombardment of Shanghai, refugees fleeing the city, and children in a Chinese orphanage.
