= The Mysterious Mr. Wong =

1934 film by William Nigh

- Theatrical poster to The Mysterious Mr. Wong
- Directed by: William Nigh
- Written by: Harry Stephen Keeler (story); Lew Levenson
- Produced by: George Yohalem
- Starring: Bela Lugosi; Wallace Ford; Arline Judge; E. Alyn Warren
- Cinematography: Harry Neumann
- Edited by: Jack Ogilvie
- Production company: Monogram Pictures
- Distributed by: Sono Art-World Wide Pictures
- Release date: December 22, 1934
- Running time: 63 min
- Country: United States
- Language: English

The Mysterious Mr. Wong is a tongue-in-cheek 1934 mystery film starring Bela Lugosi as a powerful Fu Manchu type criminal mastermind of the Chinatown underworld, and Wallace Ford as a wisecracking reporter. The film is based on Harry Stephen Keeler's 1928 short story "The Strange Adventure of the Twelve Coins of Confucius" one of three stories in Keeler's book Sing Sing Nights. Despite the name of the title character and being directed by William Nigh, it has no relation to Monogram Pictures later Mr Wong film series. The character of Mr. Wong does not appear in the original story.

== Plot ==
Bela Lugosi stars as Mr. Wong, a "harmless" Chinatown shopkeeper by day and relentless blood-thirsty pursuer of the Twelve Coins of Confucius by night. With possession of the coins, Mr. Wong will be supreme ruler of the Chinese province of Keelat, and his evil destiny will be fulfilled. A killing spree follows in dark and dangerous Chinatown as Wong gets control of 11 of the 12 coins. Though played up as a Tong war, ace reporter Jason Barton and his girl Peg are hot on his trail as is the Chinese Secret Service. All parties soon find themselves in serious trouble when they stumble onto Wong's headquarters.

== Cast ==
- Bela Lugosi as Mr. Fu Wong, alias Li See
- Wallace Ford as Jason H. Barton
- Arline Judge as Peg
- E. Alyn Warren as Philip Tsang
- Lotus Long as Moonflower
- Robert Emmett O'Connor as Officer McGillicuddy
- Chester Gan as Tung aka "Hi Strung"
- Edward Peil Sr. as Jen Yu - Wong Henchman
- Luke Chan as Professor Chan Fu
- Lee Shumway as Editor Steve Brandon
- Etta Lee as Lu San
- Ernest F. Young as Reporter Chuck Roberts
