= Hair-Trigger Casey =

1936 film

- Theatrical release poster
- Directed by: Harry L. Fraser
- Written by: Harry L. Fraser (story) (as Monroe Talbot); Harry L. Fraser (screenplay) (as Weston Edwards)
- Produced by: William Berke (producer)
- Starring: Jack Perrin
- Cinematography: Robert E. Cline
- Edited by: Arthur A. Brooks
- Distributed by: Berke-Perrin Productions
- Release date: 1936
- Running time: 59 minutes
- Country: United States
- Language: English

Hair-Trigger Casey is a 1936 American Western film directed by Harry L. Fraser.

== Cast ==
- Jack Perrin as Capt. Jim "Hair-Trigger" Casey
- Starlight the Horse as Casey's Horse
- Betty Mack as Jane Elkins
- Ed Cassidy as Karney
- Fred "Snowflake" Toones as Snowflake
- Hal Taliaferro as Dave Casey
- Phil Dunham as Abner
- Robert Walker as Colton (Border Patrol)
- Dennis Moore as Lt. Brooks
- Victor Wong as Lee Fin - Karney's Enemy
