= Charlie Chan in the Chinese Cat =

1944 film by Phil Rosen

The Chinese Cat
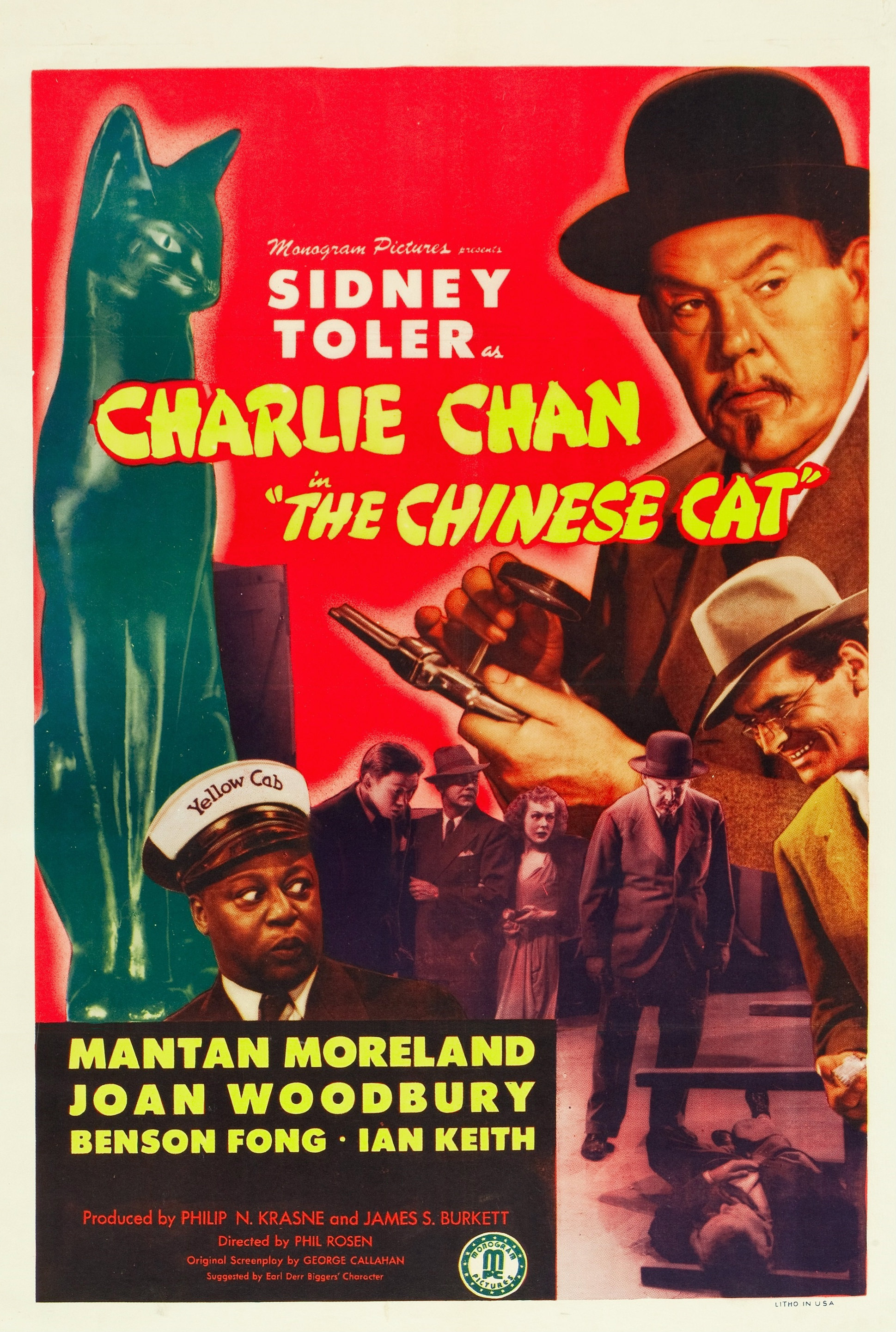
- Directed by: Phil Rosen
- Written by: Earl Derr Biggers (characters); George Callahan (screenplay)
- Produced by: Phillip N. Krasne; James S. Burkett
- Starring: Sidney Toler; Joan Woodbury; Mantan Moreland
- Cinematography: Ira H. Morgan
- Edited by: John Link
- Music by: David Chudnow
- Production company: Monogram Pictures
- Distributed by: Monogram Pictures
- Release date: May 20, 1944
- Running time: 66 minutes
- Country: United States
- Language: English

The Chinese Cat (also titled Murder in the Funhouse) is a 1944 mystery film starring Sidney Toler as Charlie Chan.

== Plot ==
Mr. Manning is murdered in his study while the door is locked from the inside. Police close the case after 6 months. Mr. Manning's step-daughter contacts Charlie Chan to try to solve the case before he leaves in 48 hours because a rival criminologist has published a book Manning Murder Solved which implicates Mrs. Manning as the murderer. Mr. Manning's business partner confronts Mrs. Manning demanding that the murder investigation be dropped. Later he is found dead by Mr. Chan while following up on clues. Identical twins are involved in a diamond-smuggling ring after the Kohinoor Diamonds are stolen; one twin is killed and the other living twin masquerades as a ghost tricking Birmingham Brown and Number 3 son. Mr. Manning had the largest stone stored in the secret compartment of a Chinese cat statue, and double-crossed his associates. Movie ends in a carnival funhouse with police arresting the diamond-smuggling ring for three murders. Rival author of Manning Murder Solved book must now pay $20,000 to Chinese War Relief after a lost bet with Charlie Chan about the murderer's identity.

== Cast ==
- Sidney Toler as Charlie Chan
- Mantan Moreland as Birmingham Brown, Taxi Driver
- Joan Woodbury as Leah Manning
- Benson Fong as Tommy Chan, #3 Son
- Ian Keith as Dr. Paul Reknik
- Sam Flint as Thomas Manning
- Betty Blythe as Mrs. Manning
- Cy Kendall as Webster Deacon
- John Davidson as twins Karl Karzos/Kurt Karzos
- Weldon Heyburn as Detective Lt. Harvey Dennis
- Anthony Warde as Catlen
- Jack Norton as hotel desk clerk
- Luke Chan as Wu Sang, curio shop owner
- George Chandler as hotel doorman (uncredited)
- Daisy Bufford as Carolina, the maid (uncredited)

== Production ==
The film was the second Charlie Chan movie from Monogram. It was originally called Charlie Chan and the Perfect Crime and filming started on 4 January 1944.

This is the film where Birmingham Brown is permanently hired as Charlie Chan's chauffeur. He is looking for a new job after the guilty criminals blow up his taxicab with a bomb.

== See also ==
- List of American films of 1944
