= Sunset Range =

1935 film by Ray McCarey

- Film poster
- Directed by: Ray McCarey
- Screenplay by: Paul Schofield (story)
- Starring: Hoot Gibson
- Cinematography: Gilbert Warrenton
- Edited by: Ralph Dietrich
- Production company: First Division Pictures
- Distributed by: First Division Pictures
- Release date: April 3, 1935
- Running time: 60 minutes
- Country: United States
- Language: English

Sunset Range is a 1935 American Western film set in modern times directed by Ray McCarey and starring Hoot Gibson. The film received a mostly positive reception, with praise for Gibson's acting and delivery of humor in what was his first western film in two years.

The film was regarded by some as being the "high point" in the filmmaking activity of the First Division Pictures studio, alongside another western, Rainbow's End, in the same year.

== Plot ==
The story starts in New York City where gangsters who have Bonnie's brother Eddie under their control travel to Arizona to visit Bonnie's recently purchased ranch called Sunset Range. The gangsters involve Bonnie in a case of kidnapping where she unknowingly hides the gangster's ransom money. The ranch she owns is managed by Reasonin' Bates, who saves both her, Eddie and the ransom money from the villain Grant.

== Cast ==
- Hoot Gibson as Reasonin' Bates
- Mary Doran as Mary "Bonnie" Shea
- James Eagles as Eddie Shea
- Walter McGrail as Grant
- John Elliott as Dan Caswell
- Ralph Lewis as Sheriff
- Eddie Lee as Lee Fong the cook
- Kitty McHugh as Della (the Maid)

== Casting ==
Gibson was cast in the leading role of Reasonin' Bates in what was his first western film in two years and the first since he had signed for First Division Pictures. The role was a departure from his usual western films, instead acting in a story with comedy and drama which was described as being one of his best performances. Gibson, who was a stunt performer in films prior to starring in westerns, performed "many feats of daring" in the film.

The villain Grant was played by Walter McGrail, who was well known in that type of character role in many previous western movies.

== Reception ==
The Sydney Morning Herald noted that despite the film's "exciting opening", the film became "leisurely" and described the acting, dialogue and humor as "feeble". The Intelligencer Journal offered a more positive review of the film, suggesting that it "will satisfy every theatregoer with entertainment and thrills", noting that the film had much comedy and dramatic situations which made for excitement. A positive assessment was also given by The News and Observer, suggesting that the film was "one of the finest westerns ever made" which was packed with "fast action, fast shooting and hard riding from beginning to end". The Reading Times had considerably praise for Gibson's performance, noting it was one of his best and that he proves himself as being an excellent rider with his handling of comedy and drama. The Casper Star-Tribune also praised the film, remarking that the film takes the audience "back to the real days of motion pictures", with praise for Gibson's delivery of humor and noting that he "has never been better than he appears in 'Sunset Range'".
