= Sleepy Lagoon (film) =

1943 film by Joseph Santley

- Directed by: Joseph Santley
- Screenplay by: Frank Gill. Jr. George Carleton Brown
- Story by: Prescott Chaplin
- Produced by: Albert J. Cohen
- Starring: Judy Canova; Dennis Day; Ruth Donnelly
- Cinematography: Bud Thackery
- Edited by: Richard Van Enger
- Music by: Mort Glickman (uncredited); Walter Scharf (uncredited); Marlin Skiles (uncredited)
- Production company: Republic Pictures
- Distributed by: Republic Pictures
- Release date: September 5, 1943 (United States)
- Running time: 65 minutes
- Country: United States
- Language: English

Sleepy Lagoon is a 1943 American musical comedy film directed by Joseph Santley and featuring comedian Judy Canova and singer Dennis Day. The film was written by Prescott Chaplin, and Frank Gill, Jr. and George Carleton Brown wrote the screenplay. It was Canova's final feature for Republic until 1951.

The setting of the film, the fictional town of Sleepy Lagoon, was possibly inspired by the song of the same name, which was popular at the time. The content of the film, however, is totally unrelated to the Sleepy Lagoon murder, which took place at a now-defunct Southern California reservoir and led to the Zoot Suit Riots.

== Plot ==
Newly elected mayor Judy Joyner takes charge of a growing but corrupt small town.

== Cast ==
- Judy Canova as Judy Joyner
- Dennis Day as Lancelot Hillie
- Ruth Donnelly as Sarah Rogers
- Joe Sawyer as Lumpy
- Ernest Truex as Dudley Joyner
- Douglas Fowley as J. "The Brain" Lucarno
- Will Wright as Cyrus Coates
- Forrest Taylor as Samuel
- Kitty McHugh as Mrs. Small
- Eddie Chandler as Ticket Seller
- Herbert Corthell as Sheriff Bates
- Ellen Lowe as Mrs. Simms
- Jack Raymond as Joe, the Clown
- Margaret Reid as Mrs. Crumm
- Mike Riley as Bandleader
- Rondo Hatton as Hunchback (uncredited)
