= Salute to the Marines =

1943 film by S. Sylvan Simon

- Theatrical release poster
- Directed by: S. Sylvan Simon
- Written by: George Bruce
- Produced by: John W. Considine Jr.
- Starring: Wallace Beery
- Cinematography: Charles Schoenbaum; W. Howard Greene
- Edited by: Fredrick Y. Smith
- Music by: Lennie Hayton
- Distributed by: Metro-Goldwyn-Mayer
- Release date: 1943
- Running time: 101 minutes
- Country: United States
- Language: English

Salute to the Marines is a 1943 World War II war film drama in Technicolor from MGM, produced by John W. Considine Jr., directed by S. Sylvan Simon, and starring Wallace Beery.

Salute to the Marines co-stars Fay Bainter, Reginald Owen, Ray Collins, Keye Luke, and Marilyn Maxwell. Beery's older brother Noah Beery, Sr. also appears in the film, which is set in the Philippines just prior to the beginning of the Pacific War.

== Plot ==
Sergeant Major William Bailey (Beery) is a longtime member of the United States Marine Corps who in early 1941 is stationed in the Philippines. His wife Jennie and daughter Helen are also living there. Bailey is a trainer and friend of "Flashy" Logaz, a Filipino boxing champion trying to make a comeback.

Bailey's commanding officer, Colonel John Mason, assigned Bailey to train a unit of Filipino civilians who are now part of a militia. Bailey hate the assignment, but after a month of training, his troops are ready for assignment. When the militia is assigned to duty in Shanghai, China, the Marines leave Bailey at home because he is too old. Deeply disappointed, Bailey gets drunk. When he and Flashy get involved in a barroom fight, Bailey is arrested by the shore patrol and sent to the brig. Helen then persuades Mason to give his father an honorable discharge from the Marines to avoid prosecution.

Bailey retires in the city of Balanga with his wife and daughter. Two Marines, Rufus Cleveland and Randall James, start vying for Helen's affection. One day in early December, some members of the Japanese merchant marine arrive in Balanga. Casper, the local store owner, says they are peaceful Bailey and Flashy suspect that their ship is actually a Japanese Navy vessel. Helen eventually accept's Rufus' marriage proposal.

On December 7, 1941, Rufus is flying when he sees Japanese planes in Philippines airspace and hears on the radio that the Japanese have bombed the Pearl Harbor naval base in Hawaii. Balanga then comes under a bombing attack. When Casper starts telling everyone they should fight the Americans, Bailey strangles him. Rufus lands at Balanga and flies out the women and children

Bailey then learns that the so-called Japanese merchant ships carry soldiers, who are now streaming ashore to attack Balanga. Bailey lead the local Filipino militia to a strategic bridge, where they fight off the Japanese advance. While in Marine full dress uniform, Bailey single-handedly takes our a Japanese machine gun emplacement. American reinforcements finally arrive and blow up the bridge. Knowing that the Japanese are going the capture the islands, Bailey tells the militia to scatter into the hills and conduct guerilla warfare. Bailey is then killed by a bomb burst.

Later on, at the Marine Corps Recruit Depot in San Diego, California, a ceremony is being held to posthumously award Bailey the Congressional Medal of Honor. Helen, now a member of the United States Marine Corps Women's Reserve, accepts the medal for her late father as the assembled corps passes in review.

== Cast ==
- Wallace Beery as Sgt. Maj. William Bailey
- Fay Bainter as Jenny Bailey
- Reginald Owen as Henry Caspar
- Ray Collins as Col. John Mason
- Keye Luke as Flashy Logaz
- Marilyn Maxwell as Helen Bailey
- William Lundigan as Rufus Cleveland
- Donald Curtis as Randall James
- Noah Beery, Sr. as Adjutant
- Dick Curtis as Cpl. Moseley
- Russell Gleason as Pvt. Hanks
- Rose Hobart as Mrs. Carson
- Hugh Beaumont as Sergeant (uncredited)
- Robert Blake as Junior Carson (uncredited)
- Jim Davis as Pvt. Saunders (uncredited)
- Chester Gan as Japanese Officer

== Production ==
Portions of the film were shot at Camp Pendleton near San Diego. The battle at the bridge was filmed at the Feather River Gateway Bridge near Oroville, California.

== Reception ==
(Review by T.S., New York Times, August 30, 1943)

"That old saurian-countenanced leatherneck, Wallace Beery, is back in uniform and fighting trim in Salute to the Marines, which burst into the Globe on Saturday. We say burst because MGM hasn't spared any ammunition in making Mr. Beery's personal defense of the Philippines a wild, rootin-tootin, bang-up affair, and in Technicolor, too. Many a model set has been demolished, many an extra smeared with scarlet, and many a Japanese blown sky-high before this extravagant yarn is over. Mr. Beery's language, now that the lid is off, is hardly less colorful: "little yellow mustard-colored monkeys" is merely one of his several definitions of our Pacific enemy".

"Briefly, it is a story tailored to Mr. Beery's familiar dimensions. An overgrown bad boy with a gilt-edged heart and a coy way of confessing his numerous sins, Mr. Beery is a bellows-lunged marine sergeant who never won a citation though he would dearly love one. He is a service chauvinist to the core; when anyone so much as breathes a word against the Marines he polishes them off even if its costs him the brig. Finally retired, amid the pacifist inhabitants of the Philippine settlement, the old sergeant calls all the shots on the Japanese game of duplicity and is finally vindicated when the Zeros come. Hollywood hindsight makes unconvincing foresight in the movies. But at any rate, Mr. Beery and some stout Filipinos fight their roaring battle and Mr. Beery, at least, wins".

"It is all Rover Boy drama in the bellowing, homespun fashion that has come to be associated with Mr. Beery, and there are many who like it. But displays of patriotism, no less than acting, can be guilty of the same cheaply theatrical excesses that, in the theatre, are defined as "ham." Mr. Beery's "Salute to the Marines" has many a hectic, as well as embarrassing moment, but he is still fighting a small boy's war".

== Home media ==
Salute to the Marines was released December 15, 2012 on Region 1 DVD by the Warner Archive.
