= Mickey Simpson =

American actor (1913–85)

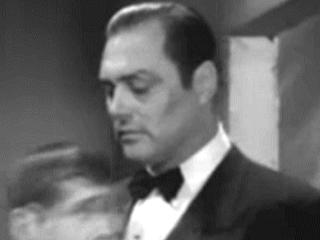
- Simpson in Bela Lugosi Meets a Brooklyn Gorilla, 1952
- Born: Charles Henry Simpson; December 3, 1913; Rochester, New York, U.S.
- Died: September 23, 1985 (aged 71); Northridge, California, U.S.
- Years active: 1921–1966
- Height: 6 ft 5 in (196 cm)
- Spouse: Maxine McFall (m 1941, d 1968)

Mickey Simpson (December 3, 1913 – September 23, 1985) was an American supporting actor of burly roles, probably most familiar as "Sarge," the bigoted diner owner in the 1956 film Giant. He appeared in over 175 films and television episodes.

== Early life ==
Simpson was born Charles Henry Simpson to Fred and Bertha Rogers Simpson. His paternal heritage was Irish. He was the eldest of four sons, one of whom, Richard, died in childhood. When his father, a contractor, was unable to work following the 1929 stock market crash, his mother supported the family as a waitress.

By his twenties, Simpson had grown into a hulking figure and considered a boxing career. He has been referred to in some sources as the 1935 "New York City Heavyweight Boxing Champion," but the only official records of his ring work are for two fights in Los Angeles in 1939, both of which he lost. Simpson, nicknamed "Mickey," arrived in Los Angeles in the late 1930s. Some unconfirmed stories have him working as a chauffeur for Claudette Colbert.

== Career ==
In 1939, he reportedly played a tiny bit part in his first film, Stagecoach. The director, John Ford, would loom large in Simpson's career.

Simpson found fairly steady movie work in various roles as guards, cops, bouncers, and thugs until his career was interrupted by World War II, in which he served in the United States Navy as a Shore Patrolman, keeping drunken sailors and townies from killing each other, while patrolling the many L.A. bars and strip clubs. When he returned to Hollywood, it was Ford who resurrected his career, giving Simpson a small but notable role as one of Walter Brennan's sons in My Darling Clementine. Simpson would appear in a total of nine Ford films. He appeared in 13 episodes of the TV series The Lone Ranger between 1950 and 1956, including episode 117 in 1953 and episode 141 in 1954. During the late 1950s, he portrayed the role of Boley on the television series Captain David Grief. In 1957, Simpson appeared as Johnny Hines on the TV western Cheyenne in the episode titled "Decision at Gunsight." In 1960, he played bully cowboy Donovan in Bat Masterson.

Simpson appeared as Rocky Duggan in the Three Stooges film Gents in a Jam in which he played a wrestler dubbed "the strongest man in the world." He even offered to tear a telephone book in half for the Stooges, who were hiding his unclothed wife (Dani Sue Nolan).

Simpson worked, primarily in lesser roles, until his late 50s.

== Death ==
Simpson died from heart failure in Northridge, California on September 23, 1985, at the age of 71.

== Selected filmography ==
- Stagecoach (1939) - (uncredited)
- Panama Lady (1939) - Rodrigo (uncredited)
- Free, Blonde and 21 (1940) - Cop (scenes deleted)
- In the Navy (1941) - Combative Civilian in Dance Hall (uncredited)
- Tight Shoes (1941) - Guard (uncredited)
- Sea Raiders (1941, Serial) - Angry Motorist [Ch. 2] (uncredited)
- Swing It Soldier (1941) - Speciality Act (uncredited)
- Keep 'Em Flying (1941) - Mickey - Academy Gate Guard (uncredited)
- Honolulu Lu (1941) - Dental Patient (uncredited)
- Lady for a Night (1942) - Big Mike, the Floorman (uncredited)
- A Date with the Falcon (1942) - Policeman (uncredited)
- Obliging Young Lady (1942) - Motorcycle Policeman (uncredited)
- Gang Busters (1942, Serial) - Ludoc's Doorman-Henchman [Chs. 5, 8] (uncredited)
- The Spoilers (1942) - Disgruntled Miner (uncredited)
- Syncopation (1942) - Policeman at Country Club (uncredited)
- The Falcon Takes Over (1942) - Bartender (uncredited)
- Timber (1942) - Lumberjack (uncredited)
- Boss of Hangtown Mesa (1942) - Tom (uncredited)
- Highways by Night (1942) - Motorcycle Policeman (uncredited)
- Behind the Eight Ball (1942) - Third Thug (uncredited)
- Arabian Nights (1942) - Hangman (uncredited)
- No Time for Love (1943) - Doctor (uncredited)
- My Darling Clementine (1946) - Sam Clanton (uncredited)
- Calendar Girl (1947) - Swedish Tug of War Man (uncredited)
- Trail Street (1947) - Man at Saloon Doors (uncredited)
- Song of Scheherazade (1947) - The Orderly (uncredited)
- Tarzan and the Huntress (1947) - Monak (uncredited)
- Slave Girl (1947) - Head Guard (uncredited)
- The Bachelor and the Bobby-Soxer (1947) - Cop in Court (uncredited)
- The Wistful Widow of Wagon Gap (1947) - Big Miner (uncredited)
- The Fabulous Texan (1947) - Sentry (uncredited)
- Road to the Big House (1947) - Case
- The Judge Steps Out (1948) - Dining Truck Driver (uncredited)
- Joe Palooka in Fighting Mad (1948) - Henchman (uncredited)
- Are You with It? (1948) - Mug (uncredited)
- Fort Apache (1948) - NCO at Dance (uncredited)
- Half Past Midnight (1948) - Husky Man (uncredited)
- The Argyle Secrets (1948) - Gil Hobrey
- River Lady (1948) - Logger (uncredited)
- The Street with No Name (1948) - Policeman at Arcade (uncredited)
- They Live by Night (1948) - Shadow (uncredited)
- Angel in Exile (1948) - Prison Guard (uncredited)
- The Three Musketeers (1948) - Executioner (uncredited)
- Adventures of Don Juan (1948) - Sergeant (uncredited)
- That Wonderful Urge (1948) - Workman (uncredited)
- Wake of the Red Witch (1948) - Second Officer (uncredited)
- A Woman's Secret (1949) - Hospital Policeman Guard (uncredited)
- Adventure in Baltimore (1949) - Townsman at Brawl (uncredited)
- It Happens Every Spring (1949) - Stadium Policeman (uncredited)
- She Wore a Yellow Ribbon (1949) - Cpl. Wagner (uncredited)
- The Fighting Kentuckian (1949) - Jacques
- When Willie Comes Marching Home (1950) - Military Policeman Kerrigan (uncredited)
- Cargo to Capetown (1950) - Scar-Faced Sailor in Bar (uncredited)
- Wabash Avenue (1950) - Policeman (uncredited)
- Wagon Master (1950) - Jesse Clegg
- Kill the Umpire (1950) - Irate Baseball Fan (uncredited)
- Surrender (1950) - Pete - Henchman
- The Sun Sets at Dawn (1950) - Prison Guard (uncredited)
- Southside 1-1000 (1950) - Studs, Reggie's Henchman (uncredited)
- Double Crossbones (1951) - Pirate (uncredited)
- Roar of the Iron Horse - Rail-Blazer of the Apache Trail (1951) - Cal - Henchman
- Kentucky Jubilee (1951) - Hood
- Mask of the Avenger (1951) - Rudolpho (uncredited)
- His Kind of Woman (1951) - Hoodlum (uncredited)
- The Red Badge of Courage (1951) - Veteran (uncredited)
- Drums in the Deep South (1951) - Jim Burns - Confederate Soldier (uncredited)
- Anne of the Indies (1951) - Pirate at Inn (uncredited)
- Ten Tall Men (1951) - Giant Riff Sentry (uncredited)
- The Lady Pays Off (1951) - Houseman (uncredited)
- Leadville Gunslinger (1952) - Henchman Monk
- Outlaw Women (1952) - Badman (uncredited)
- The San Francisco Story (1952) - Vigilante Guard (uncredited)
- Apache Country (1952) - Tom Ringo (uncredited)
- Carson City (1952) - Robbie Dolby (uncredited)
- Gents in a Jam (1952, Short) - Rocky Duggan
- What Price Glory (1952) - Military Policeman (uncredited)
- Bela Lugosi Meets a Brooklyn Gorilla (1952) - Chula
- Hellgate (1952) - Army Jailhouse Guard (uncredited)
- Star of Texas (1953) - Henchman Tom Traynor
- The Sun Shines Bright (1953) - Assistant Blacksmith (uncredited)
- Salome (1953) - Herod's Guard Captain (uncredited)
- Man in the Dark (1953) - Flannigan (uncredited)
- The Golden Blade (1953) - Muscleman (uncredited)
- Devil's Canyon (1953) - Prisoner (uncredited)
- Saginaw Trail (1953) - Frenchy
- A Lion Is in the Streets (1953) - Tim Peck, Blacksmith
- Three Sailors and a Girl (1953) - Bank Guard (uncredited)
- The Eddie Cantor Story (1953) - Headwaiter (uncredited)
- The Files of Jeffrey Jones (1954) - Willie, Thug Counterfeiter
- Rose Marie (1954) - Big Trapper at Charity Dance (uncredited)
- Prince Valiant (1954) - Prison Guard (uncredited)
- Demetrius and the Gladiators (1954) - Gambling Gladiator (uncredited)
- The Bounty Hunter (1954) - Man Hassling Alice in Saloon (uncredited)
- The Long Gray Line (1955) - New York Policeman (uncredited)
- New York Confidential (1955) - Leon Hartmann
- Seven Angry Men (1955) - Blacksmith (uncredited)
- Tall Man Riding (1955) - Deputy Jeff Barclay
- I Died a Thousand Times (1955) - Officer (uncredited)
- The Lone Ranger (1956) - Powder
- The Houston Story (1956) - Spiro (uncredited)
- The Steel Jungle (1956) - Thug Kidnapper (uncredited)
- World Without End (1956) - Naga (uncredited)
- Toward the Unknown (1956) - Gate Guard - Edwards A.F.B. (uncredited)
- The Ten Commandments (1956) - Overseer Watching from Door (uncredited)
- Giant (1956, film adaptation of Ferber's novel) - Sarge
- Gunfight at the O.K. Corral (1957) - Frank McLowery (uncredited)
- Undersea Girl (1957) - Frank Larkin, Gang Member
- Warlock (1959) - Fitzsimmons (uncredited)
- The Virginian (1964 episode "The Intruders")) - Bear Bristow
- He Rides Tall (1964) - Onie
- Rio Conchos (1964) - Bartender (uncredited)
- The Greatest Story Ever Told (1965) - Rabble-Rouser (uncredited)
- King Rat (1965) - 1st Sergeant Camp Liberator (uncredited)
- More Dead Than Alive (1969) - Crew Boss
- The Great Bank Robbery (1969) - Sam - Bank Guard #3 (final film role)
