= Stowaway (1936 film) =

1936 film by William A. Seiter

- Theatrical release poster
- Directed by: William A. Seiter
- Screenplay by: William M. Conselman; Nat Perrin; Arthur Sheekman
- Story by: Samuel G. Engel
- Produced by: Buddy G. DeSylva
- Starring: Shirley Temple; Robert Young; Alice Faye
- Cinematography: Arthur C. Miller
- Edited by: Lloyd Nosler
- Music by: Harry Revel; Mack Gordon
- Distributed by: Twentieth Century-Fox Film Corporation
- Release date: December 25, 1936
- Running time: 87 minutes
- Country: United States
- Language: English
- Budget: $500,000
- Box office: $1 million

Stowaway is a 1936 American musical drama film directed by William A. Seiter. The screenplay by William M. Conselman, Nat Perrin, and Arthur Sheekman is based on a story by Samuel G. Engel. The film is about a young orphan called "Ching Ching" (Shirley Temple) who meets wealthy playboy Tommy Randall (Robert Young) in Shanghai and then accidentally stows away on the ocean liner he is travelling on. The film was hugely successful, and is available on videocassette and DVD.

== Plot ==
American orphan Barbara "Ching-Ching" Stewart lives in Sanchow, China with her missionary guardians. When bandits threaten the village, she is sent to Shanghai for safety. Accidentally separated from her guide, Ching-Ching finds herself alone in Shanghai with her dog, Mr. Wu. She meets Tommy Randall, a rich American playboy traveling about the world by ocean liner. Tommy leaves Ching-Ching in his convertible car while he goes into a hotel to see several friends. When Tommy returns, it appears Ching-Ching is gone, though she actually crawled into the car's trunk when it started raining and has fallen asleep. Tommy's car is loaded into the ship's cargo hold and Ching-Ching accidentally becomes a stowaway. When she is discovered, Tommy provides for her, helped by Susan Parker, a beautiful young woman traveling aboard the ship with her future mother-in-law, Mrs. Hope. They are headed to Bangkok where Susan is to marry her fiancé, Richard Hope, who works there. As Susan and Tommy grow attracted to one another during the voyage, Ching-Ching plays Cupid to ignite a romance. Mrs. Hope, alarmed over Susan's attachment to Tommy, telegraphs Richard to meet them at the next port.

Tommy and Susan learn that Ching-Ching's guardians were killed by the bandits, and that she is to disembark at the next port and go to an orphanage in Shanghai. Tommy wants to stop this by adopting Ching-Ching, but being a bachelor, he cannot. He asks Susan to adopt Ching-Ching when she marries Richard but only until he can himself marry and then adopt her. The Hopes, especially Mrs. Hope, selfishly reject this plan. Disgusted by Richard's callous attitude and his overbearing mother's constant interference, Susan ends her engagement in response. She agrees to marry Tommy in name only so they can adopt Ching-Ching. They agree to divorce upon returning to the US, giving Tommy custody. During the court proceedings, they realize they love each other. They remain married and jointly adopt Ching-Ching.

== Cast ==
- Shirley Temple as Barbara "Ching-Ching" Stewart, a young American girl orphaned in China
- Robert Young as Tommy Randall, a playboy and world traveler who wants to adopt Barbara
- Alice Faye as Susan Parker, who is engaged to Mrs Hope's son, Richard
- Helen Westley as Mrs Hope, Richard's mother and Susan's future mother-in-law
- Allan Lane as Richard Hope, the son of Mrs. Hope and Susan's fiancé
- Eugene Pallette as the Colonel, Tommy's friend
- Astrid Allwyn as Kay Swift, Tommy's friend
- Jayne Regan as Dora Day, Tommy's friend
- Arthur Treacher as Atkins, Tommy's valet
- Philip Ahn as Sun Lo, Barbara's friend in Sanchow
- Willie Fung as Chang, Sun-lo's friend and a boatman
- Robert Greig as Captain of SS Victoria
- J. Edward Bromberg as Judge J. D. Booth
- Layne Tom Jr. as Chinese Boy in the Musical Band (uncredited)

== Production ==
Temple learned forty words in Mandarin Chinese for the film, later stating the learning process required six months of instruction. She was taught by UCLA student Bessie Nyi. She encountered problems in her communication with the extras on the set, however, as she found out they were actually speaking a south Chinese dialect. In the film, she impersonates Ginger Rogers (with a life-sized Fred Astaire doll fixed to her toes), Eddie Cantor, and Al Jolson singing “Mammy”. In the first take, the elastic band of the dummy, which she named Tommy Wonder, snapped off her foot. In preparation for the Jolson imitation, she had to listen and watch Jolson, something she did not enjoy doing.

Production of the movie was held up for close to four weeks while first Alice Faye then Shirley Temple came down with the flu.

The dog in the film, a miniature Chinese Pekinese which was owned by the wife of a local photographer, was given to Temple and renamed Ching-Ching (after her character in the movie). Temple's mother worked out a trade in which Temple and her father would agree to pose for the photographer in exchange for the dog.

Temple's IQ was tested during the Stowaway period and found to be 155, the genius classification.

== Critical reception ==
Variety remarked, "It’s a nifty Shirley Temple comedy with musical trimmings." Variety commented, "Whether or not due to Seiter’s efforts, [Shirley] does not appear to have outgrown […] the Little Miss Marker stage in this one as she had in her last pictures."

The New York Times applauded the film, noting that Temple had "an amusing script behind her, an agreeable adult troupe with her, and a clever director before her." The reviewer thought the film the best from Temple since Little Miss Marker.

In their March, 1937 edition, Modern Screen gave the film a three-star review and credited it as a return to form for Temple and "undoubtedly her most entertaining picture to date." The review complimented other cast members with the comment, "Robert Young and Alice Faye give thoroughly sympathetic characterizations. Helen Westley …. is excellent, as is Arthur Treacher."

== See also ==
- Shirley Temple filmography
