= A Yank on the Burma Road =

1942 film by George B. Seitz

- Directed by: George B. Seitz
- Written by: Hugo Butler; David Lang; Gordon Kahn
- Produced by: Samuel Marx
- Starring: Laraine Day; Barry Nelson; Keye Luke
- Cinematography: Lester White
- Edited by: Gene Ruggiero
- Music by: Lennie Hayton
- Production company: Metro-Goldwyn-Mayer
- Distributed by: Metro-Goldwyn-Mayer
- Release date: January 29, 1942
- Running time: 67 minutes
- Country: United States
- Language: English
- Budget: $300,000
- Box office: $552,000

A Yank on the Burma Road is a 1942 drama film directed by George B. Seitz and starring Laraine Day, Barry Nelson and Keye Luke. It is also known as China Caravan, Yanks on the Burma Road and Yanks Over the Burma Road.

It was produced as part of a cluster of Hollywood films set during the Burma campaign of World War II. Although released shortly after America's entry into the conflict, it was largely produced before the attack on Pearl Harbor. The film's sets were designed by the art director Edwin B. Willis.

== Plot ==
New York City taxi driver Joe Tracey becomes famous by single-handedly capturing the Spinaldi brothers, who killed three men during a robbery, and handing them over to the police. He is then hired by Chinese representatives who want him to lead a valuable truck convoy of medical supplies on the Burma Road from Rangoon to the Republic of China's capital at Chungking during the Second Sino-Japanese War.

In Rangoon, he meets fellow American Gail Farwood, who has had her passport canceled by the British authorities on account of her German-born mercenary husband being a pilot for the Japanese. Joe agrees to take Gail along. At every opportunity, he tries to romance her, but she manages to fend him off. When they reach the border with China, she hides from the authorities; the Chinese commander tells Joe about her husband. He initially decides to leave Gail behind, but then changes his mind.

As they drive on, Joe is moved by the suffering and resolve of the Chinese people he encounters on the way. They come across Gail's husband Tom, who has been shot down and captured by Chinese guerrillas. He is to be shot the next morning, but Joe argues with the guerrilla leader, demanding a fair trial for Tom in Chungking. Then they receive the news of the attack on Pearl Harbor. Enraged, Joe decides to lead the attack on a Japanese-occupied town blocking the road to Chungking, but insists on taking Tom, tied up, with them. The Japanese put up a fierce resistance when Joe drives his truck through the town gates. Joe uses his truck to knock down a balcony on which machine-gun nests have been placed, but the truck is disabled. Tom persuades Gail to untie him, but is killed after he shoots Joe in the shoulder. With the Japanese machine guns knocked out, the Chinese guerrillas win the fight. The convoy proceeds on its way.

== Reception ==
The film made $355,000 in the United States and Canada and $197,000 elsewhere, making a profit of $64,000.

== Cast ==
- Laraine Day as Gail Farwood
- Barry Nelson as Joe Tracey
- Stuart Crawford as Tom Farwood
- Keye Luke as Kim How
- Victor Sen Yung as Wing
- Philip Ahn as Dr. Franklin Ling
- Knox Manning as Radio Announcer
- Matthew Boulton as Rangoon Aide de Camp
- James B. Leong as Guerilla Leader
- Mrs. Poo Sai as Old Woman

Uncredited:

- Luke Chan as Officer
- Eddy Chandler as Police Desk Sergeant Mulvaney
- Cliff Clark as Police Lieutenant
- Marcelle Corday as Madame Vercheron
- James Flavin as Police Radio Dispatcher

== Bibliography ==
- Selth, Andrew. Burma, Kipling and Western Music: The Riff from Mandalay. Taylor & Francis, 2016.
- Loukides, Paul & Fuller, Linda K. Beyond the Stars: Stock Characters in American Popular Film. Popular Press, 1990.

== See also ==
- Burma Convoy, a 1941 war film
