= Too Hot to Handle (1938 film) =

1938 film by Jack Conway

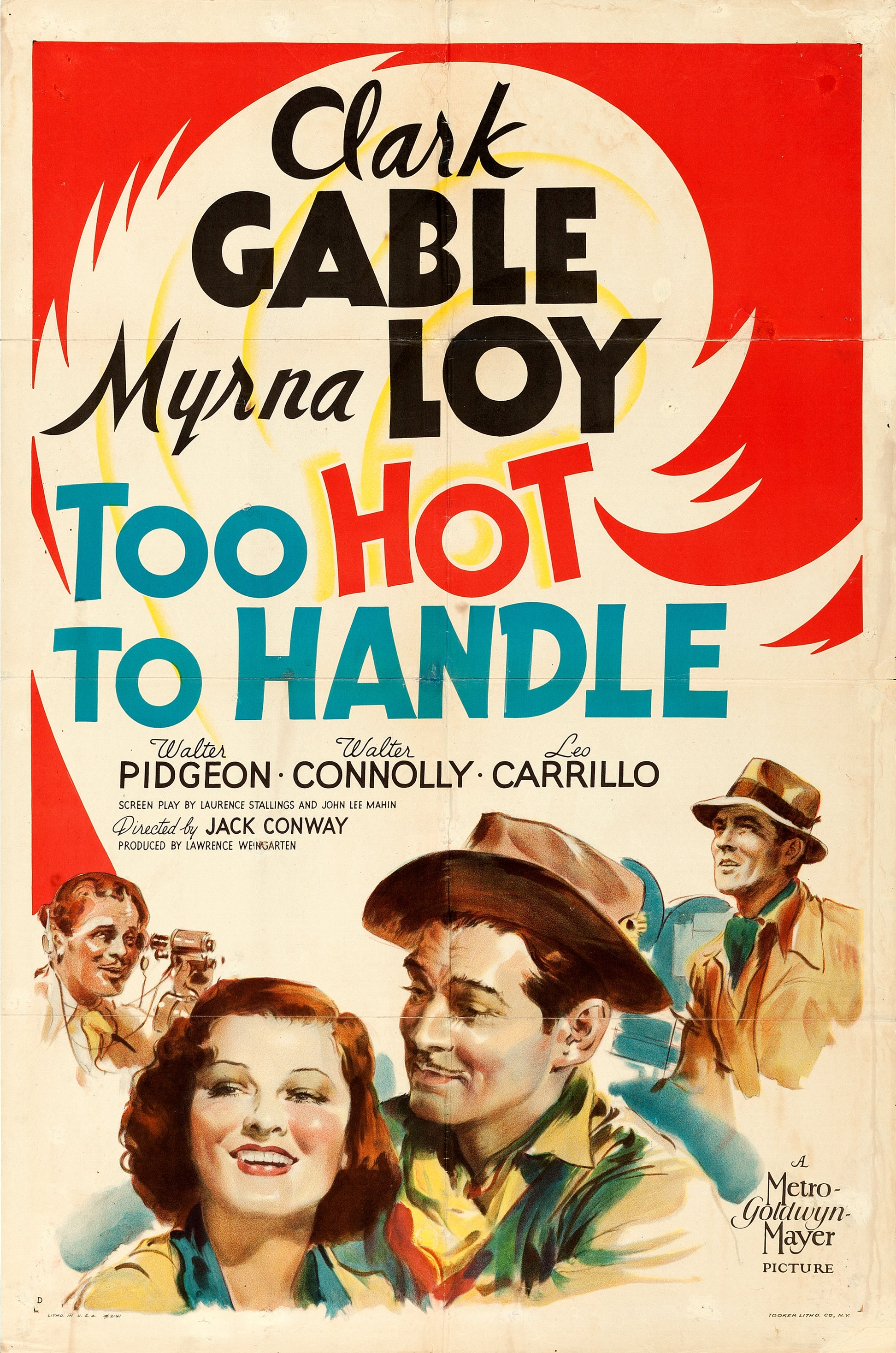
- Theatrical release poster
- Directed by: Jack Conway
- Written by: Laurence Stallings; John Lee Mahin; Buster Keaton (uncredited)
- Produced by: Lawrence Weingarten
- Starring: Clark Gable; Myrna Loy; Walter Pidgeon
- Cinematography: Harold Rosson; Clyde De Vinna (in Dutch Guiana)
- Edited by: Frank Sullivan
- Music by: Franz Waxman
- Production company: Metro-Goldwyn-Mayer
- Distributed by: Loew's Inc.
- Release date: September 16, 1938
- Running time: 106 minutes
- Country: United States
- Language: English
- Budget: $1.5 million
- Box office: $2.3 million

Too Hot to Handle, also known as Let 'Em All Talk, is a 1938 comedy-drama directed by Jack Conway and starring Clark Gable, Myrna Loy, and Walter Pidgeon. The plot concerns a newsreel reporter, the female aviator he is attracted to (influenced by Amelia Earhart, who had disappeared 14 months earlier) and his fierce competitor. Many of the comedy gags were devised by an uncredited Buster Keaton.

== Plot ==
Union Newsreel reporter Chris Hunter is sneakier and has fewer scruples than his rivals in war-torn China. When the Japanese do not oblige with a convenient aerial attack to film, Chris fakes one with a model aircraft with his cameraman José Estanza.

Outraged when he finds out, Chris' main competitor, Atlas Newsreel's Bill Dennis decides to do the same, having his aviator friend Alma Harding fly in "serum" for an imaginary cholera outbreak. Chris finds out and swoops in to film her landing. José, however, drives too close to the aircraft, causing it to crash and burst into flames. Chris rescues Alma, but when he starts to go back for the serum, she has to confess that it is a fake.

Chris piles on lie after lie to romance Alma, even pretending to get fired by his boss, "Gabby" MacArthur, for burning the footage. Chris convinces her to work for Union. She reveals that she needs the money to mount a search for her brother Harry, lost in the Amazon jungle and given up for dead by everyone else. They travel to New York (where Gabby is eagerly awaiting the landing footage Chris is secretly bringing). Bill follows to protect the woman he has loved for years from his unscrupulous competitor.

However, the whole charade is eventually revealed, discrediting Chris, Bill and Alma. Both reporters are fired, and people begin to question whether Alma's brother is really missing. Chris' budding romance with Alma is quashed when she learns of his numerous lies. Ashamed, Chris and Bill hock their equipment and have José pretend to be a generous, kind-hearted South American plantation owner. He presents Alma with nearly $8,000 and a compass supposedly from Harry's aircraft. He tells her one of his workers brought it to him. In reality, Chris etched a fake serial number on it.

Alma buys a floatplane and supplies, and sets out for South America. Both Chris and Bill follow. They eventually find a native who claims to know where Harry is. Despite José's warning that the man is a follower of voodoo and means them no good, Alma is convinced when the native produces Harry's watch.

To protect Alma, Chris and José set out on their own with their guide in a canoe. As they near the village, the native escapes, though José shoots and wounds him. Chris spots an ill white man through his binoculars. José suspects the natives intend to sacrifice him that night, so, using their camera equipment, Chris makes the frightened natives believe he is a powerful magician or god. He and José tend to the unconscious man. Despite a tense moment when their former guide shows up and denounces them, Chris maintains tenuous control of the situation. When he hears Alma flying by, he has the natives show the wreckage of Harry's aircraft. She and Bill land nearby. Chris disguises himself and his cameraman as witch doctors, and film Alma and Bill without their knowledge. The natives finally turn hostile. Alma and Bill get Harry into their aircraft, but when Chris and José try to board it (still in disguise), Bill hits Chris. The aircraft takes off, leaving Chris and José to paddle for their lives.

When Alma, Bill and Harry return to New York, they are welcomed by reporters. However, "Pearly" Todd, Bill's annoyed boss, wants to know how Chris got footage of Harry's dramatic rescue and he did not. Realizing that Chris must have been the helpful witch doctor, Alma reconciles with Chris (in the midst of a dangerous police shootout).

== Cast ==
- Clark Gable as Christopher "Chris" Hunter
- Myrna Loy as Alma Harding
- Walter Pidgeon as William O. "Bill" Dennis
- Walter Connolly as Arthur "Gabby" MacArthur
- Leo Carrillo as Joselito "José" Estanza
- Johnny Hines as Mr. Parsons
- Virginia Weidler as Hulda Harding
- Betty Ross Clarke as Mrs. Ruth Harding
- Henry Kolker as "Pearly" Todd
- Marjorie Main as Miss Kitty Wayne
- Gregory Gaye as "Popoff"
- Al Shean as "Gumpy" Gumpert
- Willie Fung as Willie
- Lillie Mui as "Tootsie"
- Patsy O'Connor as "Fake" Hulda

== Production ==
Principal photography with the pre-production title of the Let 'Em All Talk took place from May 9 to late August 1938. with the primary location in the United States being Sherwood Forest, California. Additional sequences were shot by Richard Rosson, the film's second unit director and the brother of cameraman Harold Rosson, and Clyde De Vinna in Dutch Guiana.

During pre-production, The Hollywood Reporter reported that Spencer Tracy was to star in the film along with Margaret Sullavan and George Peter Lynn; however, these roles were assigned to others, with Gable and Loy repeating their romantic pairing that had been seen in Test Pilot (1938). Too Hot to Handle was the sixth and final Gable-Loy feature.

== Reception ==
The review in Variety, noted: "Adventures of a newsreel cameraman are the basis for this Clark Gable-Myrna Loy co-starrer. It's a blazing action thriller aimed as a follow-up to same pair's click in 'Test Pilot' (1938). It has driving excitement, crackling dialog, glittering performances and inescapable romantic pull."

Reviewer Frank S. Nugent, however, represented many critics when he wrote in The New York Times: “... ’Too Hot to Handle’ is any one of a dozen fairly entertaining melodramas you might have seen in the last five years. Gable plays Chris Hunter with his customary blend of bluster and blubber. Loy’s lady-flier turns in a completely insincere performance.”

Aviation film historians Hardwick and Schnepf, more interested in the aerial scenes, described Too Hot to Handle in this way: "Gable and Loy were never better in this fast paced flick about a daring newsreel cameraman. Gable is his usual macho, superb self and there's lots of flying, including Gable hanging from the struts of a Ryan ST for shots (the same bird used in 'Test Pilot') plus a beautiful Lockheed Orion."

== Box office ==
According to MGM records, the film earned $1,627,000 in the US and Canada and $769,000 elsewhere, resulting in a small loss of $31,000.
