= Morris the Midget Moose =

- Directed by: Charles A. Nichols
- Story by: Frank Owen; Eric Gurney; Bill de la Torre
- Produced by: Walt Disney
- Starring: Clarence Nash; Dink Trout
- Music by: Oliver Wallace
- Animation by: George Nicholas; George Kreisl; Jerry Hathcock; Jack Boyd
- Layouts by: Karl Karpé
- Backgrounds by: Ray Huffine
- Production company: Walt Disney Productions
- Distributed by: RKO Radio Pictures
- Release date: November 24, 1950
- Running time: 08:02
- Country: United States

Morris the Midget Moose is a Walt Disney animated short, based on a 1945 picture book published by G.P. Putnam's sons, written and illustrated by Frank Owen, originally released to theaters on November 24, 1950, from Walt Disney Productions, originally released by RKO Radio Pictures and then, Buena Vista Distribution for its re-release.

== Plot ==
This cartoon is a two-heads-is-better-than-one parable. The bootle beetle (from Donald Duck cartoons, such as Bootle Beetle, The Greener Yard and Sea Salts) tells two younger beetles, who are fighting to reach a piece of fruit that is out of their reach, the story of Morris, a four-year-old moose, who has not grown beyond the stages of a child and is the laughing stock among the other moose. Morris is a small moose with large antlers, and meets up one day with Balsam, a large moose with embarrassingly small antlers. Morris and Balsam become good friends. Thunderclap, the strongest bull moose, is constantly challenging and defending his title as head moose. The two defeat Thunderclap with Morris standing on Balsam's back. The combined strength of Morris and Balsam becomes too much for Thunderclap. In the end the sum of the two was greater than the parts and the beetles learn the lesson by standing on each other's shoulders to reach the far hanging fruit.

== Production ==
The film was co-directed by Charles Nichols, the story was adapted by Bill Berg, written by Eric Gurney, Bill de la Torre, produced by Walt Disney, music by Oliver Wallace, animation by Jack Boyd, Jerry Hathcock, George Kreisl and George Nicholas, layouts by Karl Karpe, and the backgrounds by Ray Huffine. It featured the voices of Clarence Nash and Dink Trout.

== Home media ==
The short was released on VHS as bonus feature on The Reluctant Dragon, in 1987 and 1988, and even on DVD in December 6, 2005, on Walt Disney Treasures: Disney Rarities - Celebrated Shorts: 1920s–1960s.
