= Benson Fong =

American actor (1916–1987)

Benson Fong 鄺炳雄
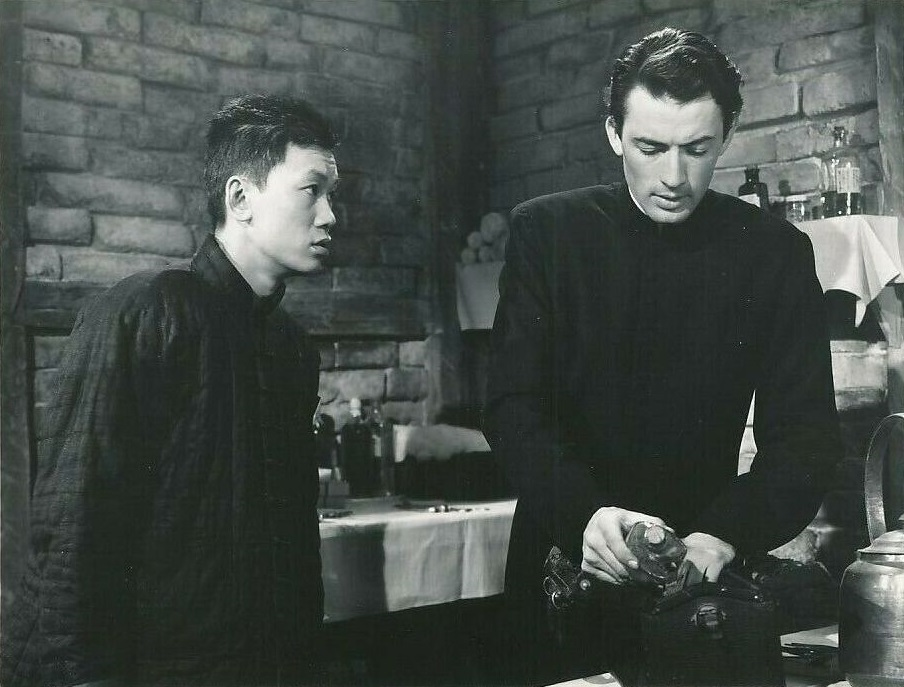
- Fong (left) and Gregory Peck in a publicity photo for The Keys of the Kingdom (1944)
- Born: October 10, 1916; Sacramento, California, US
- Died: August 1, 1987 (aged 70); Los Angeles, California, US
- Occupation: Actor
- Years active: 1936–1986
- Spouse: Maylia Fong (m. 1946)
- Children: 5

Chinese name
- Traditional Chinese: 鄺炳雄
- Simplified Chinese: 邝炳雄
Transcriptions
Standard Mandarin
- Hanyu Pinyin: Kuànɡ Bǐngxióng
- Bopomofo: ㄎㄨㄤˋ ㄅㄧㄥˇ ㄒㄩㄥˊ
- IPA: [kʰwâŋ pìŋ.ɕjʊ̌ŋ]
Yue: Cantonese
- Jyutping: Kwong3 Bing2hung4

Benson Fong (Chinese: 鄺炳雄; October 10, 1916 – August 1, 1987) was an American character actor.

Born in Sacramento, California, Fong was from a mercantile family of Chinese extraction. After graduating from high school in Sacramento, he studied briefly in China before returning to Sacramento and opening a grocery store with a cousin.

== Career ==
Fong's acting career resulted from a chance meeting with a Hollywood talent scout. In 1943, while having dinner with some friends in Sacramento, he was approached by a man from Paramount Pictures, who asked if he would like to be in a movie. Fong ended up with a role in a film called China starring Loretta Young and Alan Ladd. He was also offered a 10-week contract for $250 a week.

"It looked like a tremendous fortune and I accepted quickly, afraid they might think twice and back out," he told an interviewer. "I couldn't read lines too well, but World War II was under way and all the studios were looking for actors with Oriental features. I bicycled around from one set to another, playing a Japanese here, a Filipino there, a Chinese on still other days."

The next year, he played one of the sons in Charlie Chan in the Secret Service. Other films in which he appeared included Thirty Seconds Over Tokyo, The Keys of the Kingdom, His Majesty O'Keefe, Flower Drum Song, Our Man Flint, and The Strongest Man in the World.

First appearing onscreen in Charlie Chan at the Opera as an extra, he returned to the series and is best remembered playing Number Three Son "Tommy Chan" opposite Sidney Toler in six Charlie Chan movies between 1944 and 1946, replacing Victor Sen Yung's Number Two Son, Jimmy.

His later career as an actor included numerous TV appearances in both series and movies. Fong made four guest appearances on Perry Mason, seven on My Three Sons as Ray Wong, and four on Kung Fu. Additionally, he played The Old One in the 1986 TV movie Kung Fu:The Movie.

He played Mr. Tang Wu in Disney's The Love Bug. Actress Michele Lee later said that the 52-year-old actor had to have his jet-black hair sprayed bright white to make him look older.

Later in life, Fong became a successful restaurateur and opened several Ah Fong (亞方) restaurants in California. His chain of five restaurants, which he built up over a 30-year period, resulted from a casual remark made by actor Gregory Peck. After appearing together in The Keys of the Kingdom, Fong recalled, Peck suggested they start a restaurant together. "The idea appealed to me," Fong said. By that time, he was dating his future wife Gloria. Wanting to have a predictable income instead of becoming one more struggling actor, he decided the restaurant would have to be done with his own capital, so he began saving. Two years later, he had $11,000, and in 1946, opened his first Ah Fong's on Hollywood's Vine Street. By 1971, four others had opened. The Ah in the Ah Fong's name is a term of respect in Chinese, but Fong thought up the name while looking at the wrapper of an "Oh Henry!" candy bar. Retiring from the business in 1985, only the Hollywood Ah Fong's remained, owned by a relative, at the time of his death.

An avid golfer and frequent traveler to Asia, Fong practiced meditation and once described himself as "a split personality – half a pound Oriental and eight ounces Yankee". He stated in one interview that he summed up his life this way: "Whatever I am, spiritually speaking, is what I've wanted to be, nothing more and nothing less. Call me a happy man and you call me by my rightful name."

== Personal life and death ==
Fong was married to the actress Maylia Fong, with whom he had five children. He died of a stroke in Los Angeles, California, in 1987.

== Filmography ==
- Charlie Chan at the Opera (1936) .... Opera Supernumerary (uncredited)
- The Fighting Devil Dogs (1938, Serial) .... Gehorda outlaw (Ch. 9 Attack from the Skies) (uncredited)
- China (1943) .... Guerilla (uncredited)
- Behind the Rising Sun (1943) .... Japanese Officer with message (uncredited)
- Destroyer (1943) Japanese sonar operator (uncredited)
- Destination Tokyo (1943) .... Japanese (uncredited)
- Charlie Chan in the Secret Service (1944) .... Tommy Chan
- Up in Arms (1944) .... Japanese sentry (uncredited)
- The Purple Heart (1944) .... Moy Ling (uncredited)
- Charlie Chan in The Chinese Cat (1944) .... Tommy Chan
- Dragon Seed (1944) .... Student (uncredited)
- Thirty Seconds Over Tokyo (1944) .... Young Dr. Chung
- The Keys of the Kingdom (1944) .... Joseph
- China Sky (1945) .... Chung
- The Scarlet Clue (1945) .... Tommy Chan
- Back to Bataan (1945) .... Officer making broadcast (uncredited)
- Nob Hill (1945) .... Chinese servant (uncredited)
- Secret Agent X-9 (1945 serial) .... Dr. Hakahima
- The Shanghai Cobra (1945) .... Tommy Chan
- First Yank Into Tokyo (1945) .... Capt. Tanahe
- The Red Dragon (1945) .... Tommy Chan
- Dark Alibi (1946) .... Tommy Chan
- Deception (1946) .... Jimmy – Hollenius' servant
- Calcutta (1947) .... Young Chinese clerk
- Women in the Night (1948) .... Chang
- Hazard (1948) .... Houseboy (uncredited)
- Boston Blackie's Chinese Venture (1949) .... Ah Hing – Wong's salesclerk (uncredited)
- Chinatown at Midnight (1949) .... Joe Wing
- Three Husbands (1951) .... George the butler (uncredited)
- Korea Patrol (1951) .... Kim – South Korean scout
- Peking Express (1951) .... Wong
- Katie Did It (1951) .... Lahoo (uncredited)
- Submarine Command (1952) .... Major Kim (uncredited)
- Back at the Front (1952) .... Rickshaw boy
- His Majesty O'Keefe (1954) .... Mr. Chou
- Dragonfly Squadron (1954) .... Capt. Liehtse
- The Left Hand of God (1955) .... Chun Tien (husband of dying woman)
- Conquest of Space (1955) .... Imoto
- The Scarlet Hour (1956)....Benson (uncredited)
- Five Gates to Hell (1959) .... Gung Sa
- Walk Like a Dragon (1960) .... Wu
- Flower Drum Song (1961) .... Wang Chi-Yang
- Girls! Girls! Girls! (1962) .... Kin Yung
- Our Man Flint (1966) .... Dr. Schneider
- The Love Bug (1968) .... Mr. Tang Wu
- Charley Varrick (1973) .... Honest John
- A Time for Love (1974)
- He Is My Brother (1975) .... Kiko
- The Strongest Man in the World (1975) .... Ah Fong
- Oliver's Story (1978) .... John Hsiang
- S.O.B. (1981) .... Chef
- Jinxed! (1982) .... Dr. Wing

== Television ==
- Lux Video Theatre – "The Bachelor of Grandby Oaks", 1954 .... Alexander
- Navy Log – "Operation Typewriter", 1956 .... Colonel Huam
- Crossroads – "The Inner Light", 1956 .... Po Ling
- Crusader – "Pressure", 1956 .... Dr. Chen
- Perry Mason – Gow Loong in "The Case of the Empty Tin", 1958; James Hing in "The Case of the Caretaker's Cat", 1959; Itsubi Nogata in "The Case of the Blushing Pearls", 1959; Oolong Kim in "The Case of the Waylaid Wolf", 1961
- Death Valley Days – "Sam Kee and Uncle Sam", 1959 .... Sam Kee
- The Islanders – "The Generous Politician", 1960 .... O'Hara
- Have Gun - Will Travel – "The Hatchet Man", 1960 .... Det. Joe Tsin
- Hong Kong – "With Deadly Sorrow", 1961.... Lee-Po
- Bonanza – uncredited in "Day of the Dragon", 1961; Na Shan in "A Pink Cloud Comes from Old Cathay", 1964
- The Beachcomber – "The Brooch", 1962 .... Ah Ling
- Bachelor Father – "The Twain Shall Meet", 1962 .... Mr. Chang
- My Three Sons – seven episodes, 1963–1969 .... Ray Wong
- Ben Casey – "No More, Cried the Rooster-There Will be Truth", 1965 .... Mr. Lee
- The Wild Wild West – "The Night the Dragon Screamed", 1966 .... Mo Ti
- The FBI – "The Hiding Place", 1966 .... Dr. Leonard Shigetsu
- Dundee and the Culhane – "The Vasquez Brief", 1967
- I Spy – "An American Empress", 1967 .... Cheng
- Family Affair – Paul Chang in "The Great Kow-Tow", 1968; Eng Ho in "Number One Boy", 1969; and "Eastward Ho", 1970
- It Takes a Thief – "Mad in Japan", 1969 .... Dr. Takita
- Mission: Impossible – "Butterfly", 1970 .... Inspector Akita
- Travis Logan, D.A. 1971, TV movie .... Alfred Ling
- Bewitched – "Sam's Witchcraft Blows a Fuse", 1972 .... Mr. Fong
- The Smith Family – "San Francisco Cop", 1972 .... Frank Low
- Kung Fu – Han Fei in "Pilot", 1972; Soong in "Blood Brother", 1973; Sorcerer Liu in "The Brujo", 1973; Li Yu in "The Vanishing Image", 1974
- Ironside – "Terror on Grant Avenue", 1974 .... Henry Wing
- Police Story – "Year of the Dragon Parts I & II", 1975 .... William Liu
- Harry O – "Forbidden City", 1976 .... Soong Kee
- The Amazing Spider-Man – "The Chinese Web Parts I & II", 1979 .... Min Lo Chan
- Moonlight – 1982, TV movie .... Clifford Wu
- TJ Hooker – "Chinatown", 1983 .... Lee Chan
- The Glitter Dome – 1984, HBO movie .... Wing
- Crazy Like a Fox – "Year of the Fox", 1985 .... Harry Woo
- Kung Fu:The Movie – 1986, TV movie .... The Old One (final film role)
