= Dangerous Money =

- Directed by: Terry O. Morse
- Written by: Earl Derr Biggers (characters); Miriam Kissinger
- Produced by: James S. Burkett
- Starring: Sidney Toler; Gloria Warren; Victor Sen Yung; Rick Vallin
- Cinematography: William A. Sickner
- Edited by: William Austin
- Music by: Edward J. Kay
- Production company: Monogram Pictures
- Distributed by: Monogram Pictures
- Release date: October 12, 1946
- Running time: 66 minutes
- Country: United States
- Language: English

Dangerous Money

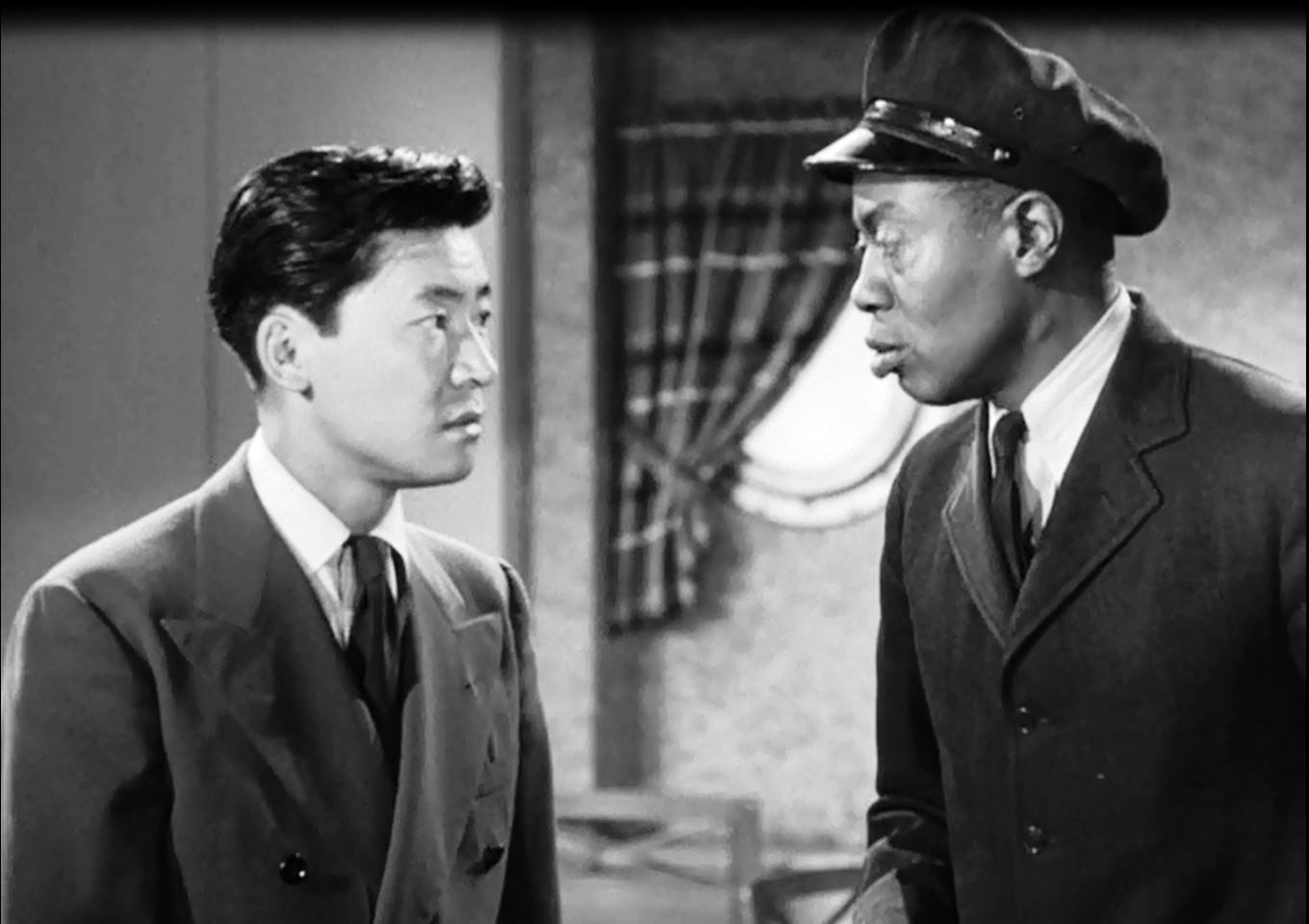
Victor Sen Yung and Willie Best in Dangerous Money (1946)

Dangerous Money is a 1946 American film directed by Terry O. Morse, featuring Sidney Toler as Charlie Chan.

== Plot ==
Aboard an ocean liner bound for Samoa, United States Treasury agent Scott Pearson confidentially asks Charlie Chan for help; he is on the trail of stolen currency and art treasures plundered from Philippine banks during the Japanese invasion. Two attempts have been made on his life. Chan rescues him from a third, but not the fourth (a knife in the back). The ship's captain asks Chan to complete the dead man's mission.

== Cast ==
- Sidney Toler as Charlie Chan
- Victor Sen Yung as Jimmy Chan, Number Two Son
- Willie Best as Chattanooga Brown
- Rick Vallin as Tao Erickson
- Joseph Crehan as Captain Black
- John Harmon as Freddie Kirk
- Bruce Edwards as Harold Mayfair
- Dick Elliott as P.T. Burke
- Joseph Allen as George Brace, purser
- Gloria Warren as Rona Simmonds, an English tourist with a crush on the purser George Brace
- Amira Moustafa as Laura Erickson, Tao's wife
- Tristram Coffin as Scott Pearson
- Selmer Jackson as Ship's Doctor
- Dudley Dickerson as Big Ben
- Rito Punay as Pete, steward
- Emmett Vogan as Professor Martin
- Elaine Lange as Cynthia Martin, the professor's wife
- Leslie Denison as Reverend Whipple, missionary

== Production ==
The film's working title was Hot Money.

The role of Chan's chauffeur Birmingham Brown was traditionally played by comedian Mantan Moreland, but not in this film. Mantan Moreland and Ben Carter, seen in the 1945 Chan mystery The Scarlet Clue, became so popular as a comedy team that they embarked on a coast-to-coast personal-appearance tour for eight weeks, which is why Moreland was missing from the next two Chan pictures, The Red Dragon and Dangerous Money. Veteran African-American comic Willie Best substituted for him as Chattanooga Brown, Birmingham's cousin.

Sidney Toler was seriously ill during filming. Diagnosed with cancer, the 72-year-old Toler could hardly walk but insisted on seeing the project through. Monogram hired Toler's original foil, "Number Two Son" Sen Yung (now billed on screen as Victor Sen Young), easing the burden on Toler and relieving him of some of the action.

== Reception ==
Thalia Bell of Motion Picture Daily thought Dangerous Money was par for the series: "Typical murder mystery in typical Chan style. Sidney Toler portrays the Chinese detective in familiar fashion, while Victor Sen Young and Willie Best contribute their usual style of comedy." Showmen's Trade Review commented, "Entire locale of the story takes place aboard a ship, which naturally confines the action and makes the picture a little slower than most, but this shouldn't hinder its acceptance. Smooth and able in a role that seems to have become second nature to him, Sidney Toler is again the brilliant Chinese sleuth."

== Copyright status ==
While some presume the film to be in the public domain, due to the omission of a valid copyright notice on original-release prints, Dangerous Money was indeed registered for copyright by Monogram Pictures on September 29, 1946 (certificate number LP656).
