= Barbara Wong =

Barbara Wong may refer to:

- Wong Chun-chun (born 1972), Hong Kong film director, screenwriter, actress and producer, also known as Barbara Wong
- Barbara Jean Wong (1924–1999), Chinese American actress
