= Scattergood Pulls the Strings =

1941 film by Christy Cabanne

- Theatrical release poster
- Directed by: Christy Cabanne; John E. Burch (assistant)
- Written by: Christy Cabanne; Bernard Schubert
- Produced by: Jerrold T. Brandt
- Starring: Guy Kibbee; Bobs Watson; Susan Peters; James Corner; Emma Dunn; Dink Trout; Monte Blue
- Cinematography: Jack MacKenzie
- Edited by: Desmond Marquette
- Music by: Constantin Bakaleinikoff
- Production company: Pyramid Productions
- Distributed by: RKO Radio Pictures
- Release date: May 23, 1941
- Running time: 70 minutes
- Country: United States
- Language: English

Scattergood Pulls the Strings is a 1941 American comedy film directed by Christy Cabanne and written by Christy Cabanne and Bernard Schubert. It is the sequel to the 1941 film Scattergood Baines. The film stars Guy Kibbee, Bobs Watson, Susan Peters, James Corner, Emma Dunn, Dink Trout and Monte Blue. The film was released on May 23, 1941, by RKO Pictures.

== Plot ==
Store owner Scattergood Baines helps a boy find his runaway father, who has escaped prison after being falsely accused, and a young scientist who is trying to invent a television with colors, while being opposed by his girlfriend's father.

== Cast ==
- Guy Kibbee as Scattergood Baines
- Bobs Watson as Jimmy Jordan
- Susan Peters as Ruth Savage
- James Corner as Urban Downs
- Emma Dunn as Mirandy Baines
- Dink Trout as Pliny Pickett
- Monte Blue as Ben Mott
- Carl Stockdale as Squire Pettibone
- Paul White as Hipp
- Fern Emmett as Clara Potts
- Lee 'Lasses' White as Ed Potts
- Ann Shoemaker as Mrs. Downs
- Gordon Hart as Homer Savage
- Howard C. Hickman as Withers
- Earle Hodgins as Deputy

== Bibliography ==
- Erickson, Hal. From Radio to the Big Screen: Hollywood Films Featuring Broadcast Personalities and Programs. McFarland, 2014.
- Fetrow, Alan G. Feature Films, 1940-1949: a United States Filmography. McFarland, 1994.
