= Navy Wife =

Navy Wife may refer to:

- Navy Wife (1935 film), an American drama film
- Navy Wife (1956 film), a comedy film
