= Scattergood Survives a Murder =

1942 film by Christy Cabanne

- Theatrical release poster
- Directed by: Christy Cabanne; Ridgeway Callow (assistant)
- Screenplay by: Michael L. Simmons
- Based on: the short stories, Scattergood Baines by Clarence Budington Kelland
- Produced by: Jerrold T. Brandt; Frank Melford (associate)
- Starring: Guy Kibbee; John Archer; Margaret Hayes; Wallace Ford; Spencer Charters; Eily Malyon
- Cinematography: Jack MacKenzie
- Edited by: Richard Cahoon
- Music by: Paul Sawtell
- Production company: Pyramid Pictures
- Distributed by: RKO Radio Pictures
- Release date: October 16, 1942 (US)
- Running time: 66 minutes
- Country: United States
- Language: English

Scattergood Survives a Murder is a 1942 American mystery film directed by Christy Cabanne from a screenplay by Michael L. Simmons, based on the series of short stories about "Scattergood Baines", penned by Clarence Budington Kelland.

== Cast ==
- Guy Kibbee as Scattergood Baines
- John Archer as Dunker Gilson
- Margaret Hayes as Gail Barclay
- Wallace Ford as Wally Collins
- Spencer Charters as Sheriff
- Eily Malyon as Mrs. Grimes
- John Miljan as Rolfe
- George Chandler as Sam Caldwell
- Dick Elliott as Mathew Quentin
- Florence Lake as Phoebe Quentin
- Sarah Edwards as Selma Quentin
- Willie Best as Hipp
- George Guhl as Deputy
- Eddy Waller as Lafe Allen
- Margaret Seddon as Cynthia Quentin
- Margaret McWade as Lydia Quentin
- Frank Reicher as Thaddeus Quentin
- Earle Hodgins as Coroner

== Production ==
In July 1942 it was announced that Guy Kibbee would star in the picture, to be produced by Jerrold T. Brandt, who had produced the earlier 4 Scattergood films.
