= The Scarlet Clue =

1945 film by Phil Rosen

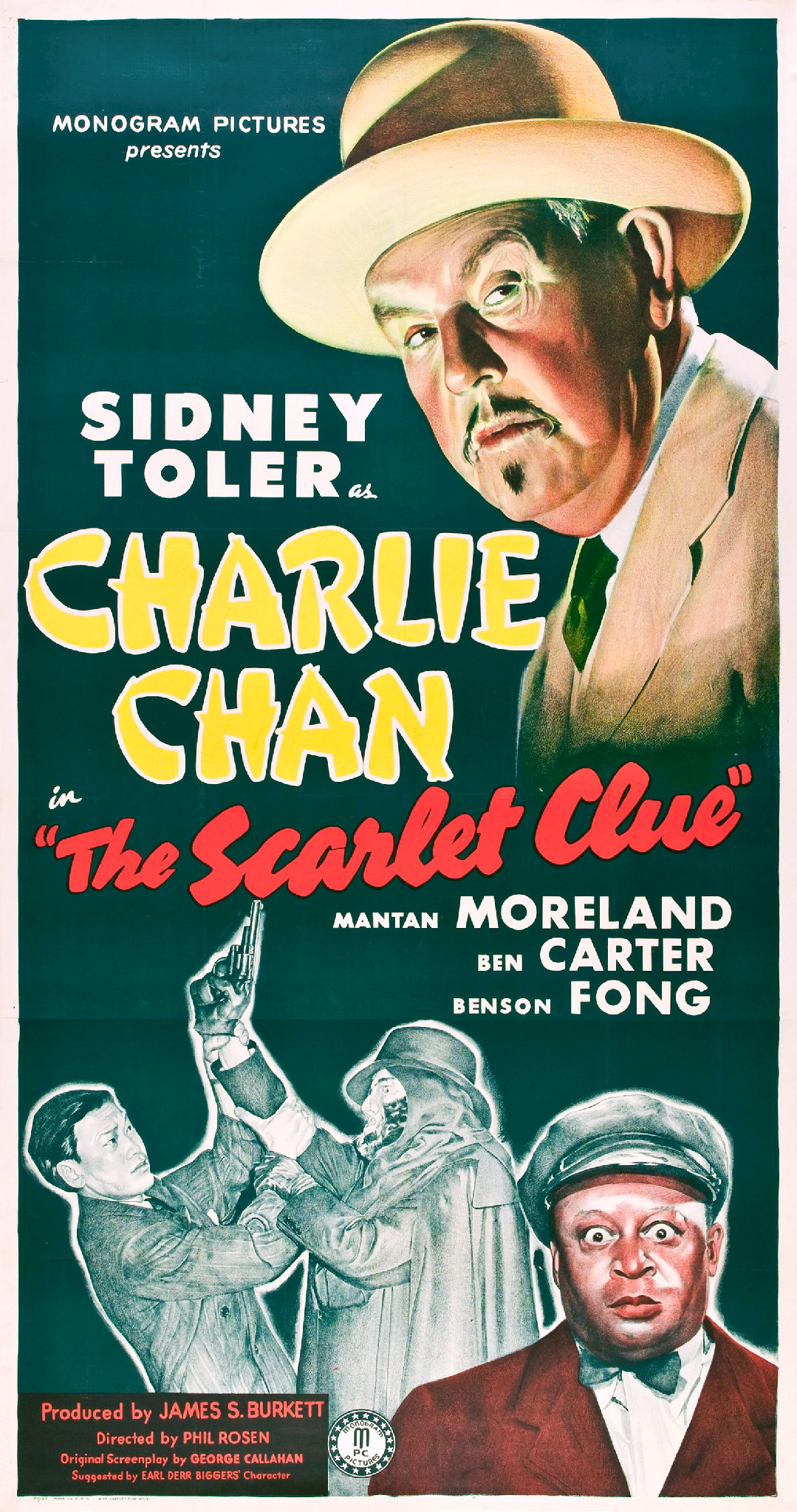
- Film Poster
- Directed by: Phil Rosen
- Written by: George Callahan
- Based on: Characters created by Earl Derr Biggers
- Produced by: James S. Burkett
- Starring: Sidney Toler; Mantan Moreland; Ben Carter
- Cinematography: William A. Sickner
- Edited by: Richard C. Currier
- Music by: Edward J. Kay
- Production company: Monogram Pictures
- Distributed by: Monogram Pictures
- Release date: May 11, 1945
- Running time: 65 minutes
- Country: United States
- Language: English

The Scarlet Clue

The Scarlet Clue is a 1945 American mystery film directed by Phil Rosen and starring Sidney Toler, Mantan Moreland, and Ben Carter. It was produced and released by Monogram Pictures.

== Plot ==
Government agent Charlie Chan and a police investigator are tracking down the theft of radar secrets. When the man they are tailing is murdered, a clue left behind is a footprint in blood. An automobile on the scene, reported stolen, leads Chan—accompanied by Number Three Son Tommy and chauffeur Birmingham Brown—to a radio station. Birmingham runs into his old friend Ben Carter at the station, while Chan interrogates the staff, actors, cleaning woman, and tyrannical sponsor. The closer Chan gets to solving the mystery, the more often the mysterious murders happen.

The radio station is on the same skyscraper floor as a science laboratory, where the radar secrets are developed. The lab also has a weather chamber that can create below-zero blizzards or extreme heat. Tommy and Birmingham become trapped in the chamber, but Chan rescues them.

Station manager Ralph Brett is part of the spy ring, but he can only communicate with the master spy by telephone—with the response always returning by teletype. The master spy employs a clever poison that causes death in conjunction with lighting a cigarette. Blackmailing actress Gloria Bayne and genial ham actor Willie Rand meet death by this device.

The master spy judges Brett to be a liability, and lures Brett to a freight elevator. A trap door opens beneath him and drops him seven stories to his death. Chan now suspects who the guilty party is, and finds a way to force the culprit out into the open. When the master spy desperately tries to make a getaway, Chan grimly observes, "Killer caught in own trap."

== Cast ==
- Sidney Toler as Charlie Chan
- Mantan Moreland as Birmingham Brown, Chauffeur
- Ben Carter as Ben
- Benson Fong as Tommy Chan
- Robert Homans (as Robert E. Homans) as Capt. Flynn
- Virginia Brissac as Mrs. Marsh
- Jack Norton as Willie Rand
- I. Stanford Jolley as Ralph Brett
- Janet Shaw as Gloria Bayne
- Helen Deverell (as Helen Devereaux) as Diane Hall
- Milton Kibbee as Herbert Sinclair
- Victoria Faust as Hulda Swenson
- Leonard Mudie as Horace Karlos
- Emmett Vogan as Hamilton of the Hamilton Laboratory
- Charles Wagenheim as Rausch
- Tom Quinn as Chemist
- Charles Jordan as Nelson

== Production ==
The film began production as The Radio Mystery. In February 1945 Monogram changed the title to The Scarlet Clue—in the wake of Universal's successful Sherlock Holmes mystery The Scarlet Claw.

== Reception ==
The Scarlet Clue opened to good reviews. "One of the better Chan thrillers, this keeps interest at a high level. It will make a good addition to the twin bills," reported The Exhibitor. The Hollywood Reporter approved: "This neatly executed and nicely paced package keeps up the tradition of comedy, suspense, and suavity that mystery fans have come to expect and demand. The comedy team of Mantan Moreland and Ben Carter are given ample opportunity to gag, and tie audiences in proverbial stitches." Wanda Hale of the New York Daily News noted, "This one really keeps your mind active trying to beat Charlie to the solution of the four murders." Variety liked the mystery angle: "Picture actually has suspense, and the well-written script keeps viewers guessing as to the actual murderer. Film gathers momentum and the denouement actually catches the viewers off guard." Film Daily covered the preview: "Here is a Charlie Chan offering that should please the mystery fans. It has been given good direction by Phil Rosen, with James S. Burkett rating a bow for production values. Sidney Toler delivers his usual splendid performance."

Mantan Moreland and Ben Carter became so popular as a comedy team that they embarked on a coast-to-coast personal-appearance tour for eight weeks, which is why Moreland was missing from the next two Chan pictures, The Red Dragon and Dangerous Money. Veteran African-American comic Willie Best substituted for him.

== Copyright status ==
While some presume the film to be in the public domain because the copyright notice is missing from the home-video versions (the British source print removed the American copyright notice), The Scarlet Clue was indeed registered for copyright by Monogram Pictures on April 1, 1945 (certificate number LP13234).
