= Men in Her Life =

1931 film

- Directed by: William Beaudine
- Written by: Samuel Hopkins Adams; Dorothy Howell; Robert Riskin
- Produced by: Frank Fouce
- Starring: Lois Moran; Charles Bickford; Victor Varconi; Don Dillaway
- Cinematography: Ted Tetzlaff
- Edited by: Richard Cahoon
- Production company: Columbia Pictures
- Distributed by: Columbia Pictures
- Release date: December 10, 1931
- Running time: 70 minutes
- Country: United States
- Language: English

Men in Her Life is a 1931 American pre-Code drama film directed by William Beaudine and starring Lois Moran, Charles Bickford and Victor Varconi. It was based on a 1930 novel by Warner Fabian (Samuel Hopkins Adams). It was made during a brief spell Beaudine had working at Columbia Pictures. Critics considered the film one of the studio's better B releases. Part of the film was set in the Café de la Paix in Paris which was reconstructed authentically at the Columbia studios. Columbia also made a Spanish-language version of this film, entitled Hombres en mi vida.

== Plot ==
Julia Cavanaugh (Lois Moran) is a formerly rich socialite who is heavily in debt. She meets Count Ivan Karloff (Victor Varconi), a Russian con-man, whom she hopes to marry to relieve her financial problems. They get engaged and he seduces her but when he finds out that she has no money, he abandons her.

Shortly afterwards, she meets a retired bootlegger named Flashy Madden (Charles Bickford), a rough type who offers to pay off her debts if she will teach him how to be a gentleman. She replies that she can only teach him how to behave like one, not how to be one, but she accepts the offer.

Julia is being courted by the son of a senator, Dick Webster (Don Dillaway), and although she is uncertain, she knows that it will benefit her precarious situation and finally accepts. Just as the engagement is about to be announced, Flashy tells Julia that he is in love with someone and can she help him find the words to tell her. They perform a mock proposal together and just as Flashy is about to do it for real, she tells him about her up-coming engagement. Flashy is disappointed but wishes her well.

The engagement is announced in the press and the count reads about it. He appears at Julia's apartment and attempts to blackmail her. Flashy is in an adjoining room and overhears the interchange. He tells Julia that he will take care of it and takes the money to Karloff's lodgings. An argument ensues over relinquishing indiscreet letters from Julia and Karloff pulls out a gun and is shot by Flashy in the struggle over the gun. Flashy is arrested but refuses to say anything in order to protect Julia. He does tell his defense counsel, however, and the lawyer goes to see Julia about it. Julia agrees to testify even though it will destroy her reputation. Over Flashy's protests and outbursts in court, she gives testimony about what happened. Her fiancé is in the spectators gallery and on hearing the truth, he leaves the court and ends the engagement. Flashy is acquitted on the grounds of self-defense and is released. He decides to go to Florida and goes to say goodbye to Julia. Julia repeats the same words that Flashy had spoken to her in the mock-proposal, saying that there is a man, the greatest gentleman she has ever known, with whom she is in love and whom she doesn't know how to tell. They embrace and kiss.

== Cast ==
- Lois Moran as Julia Cavanaugh
- Charles Bickford as Flashy Madden
- Victor Varconi as Count Ivan Karloff
- Don Dillaway as Dick Webster
- Luis Alberni as Anton
- Adrienne D'Ambricourt as Maria
- Barbara Weeks as Miss Mulholland
- Wilson Benge as Wilton
- Oscar Apfel as Blake
- Hooper Atchley as District Attorney

== Spanish-language version ==
Columbia produced a Spanish-language version of the film, Hombres en mi vida, which was directed by David Selman, and premiered in Los Angeles on February 13, 1932.

=== Spanish-language cast ===
- Lupe Vélez as Julia Clark
- Gilbert Roland as Jaime Gilman
- Ramón Pereda as Andrés Brennon
- Carlos Villarías as Bray, abogado defensor
- Paul Ellis as Conde Ivan Karloff
- Luis Alberni as Gaston
- Paco Moreno as Criado Williams

== Bibliography ==
- Marshall, Wendy L. William Beaudine: From Silents to Television. Scarecrow Press, 2005.
