= The Mysterious Avenger =

1936 film

- Directed by: David Selman
- Written by: Ford Beebe (original story and screenplay); Peter B. Kyne (story)
- Edited by: Richard Cahoon
- Distributed by: Columbia Pictures
- Release date: January 17, 1936
- Running time: 54 minutes
- Country: United States
- Language: English

The Mysterious Avenger is a 1936 American Western film directed by David Selman. It features an early appearance by Jon Hall.

== Cast ==
- Charles Starrett ... Ranny Maitland / Ranny Morgan
- Joan Perry ... Alice Lockhart
- Wheeler Oakman ... Brophy
- Edward LeSaint ... Lockhart
- Lafe McKee ... Maitland
- Hal Price ... Sheriff
- Jon Hall ... Lafe Lockhart (as Charles Locher)
- George Chesebro ... Henchman Foley
- Sons of the Pioneers... Musicians & Rangers
- Roy Rogers ... Musician Len (as Len Slye)
- Bob Nolan ... Musician Bob (as Sons of the Pioneers)
- Hugh Farr ... Musician Hugh (as Sons of the Pioneers)
- Karl Farr ... Musician Karl (as Sons of the Pioneers)
- Tim Spencer ... Musician Tim (as Sons of the Pioneers)
- Jack Carlyle ... Texas Rangers Captain
