= Ride on Vaquero =

1941 film directed by Herbert I. Leeds

- Theatrical release poster
- Directed by: Herbert I. Leeds
- Screenplay by: Samuel G. Engel
- Based on: Suggested by the character "The Cisco Kid" created by William Sydney Porter (O.Henry)
- Produced by: Sol M. Wurtzel (executive producer)
- Starring: Cesar Romero; Mary Beth Hughes; Lynne Roberts; Chris-Pin Martin; Robert Lowery; Ben Carter
- Cinematography: Lucien Andriot, a.s.c.
- Edited by: Louis Loeffler
- Music by: Emil Newman (musical direction)
- Production company: 20th Century Fox
- Distributed by: 20th Century Fox
- Release date: April 18, 1941
- Running time: 64 minutes
- Country: United States
- Language: English

Ride on Vaquero is a 1941 American Western film directed by Herbert I. Leeds and written by Samuel G. Engel. The film stars Cesar Romero, Mary Beth Hughes, Lynne Roberts, Chris-Pin Martin, Robert Lowery and Ben Carter. The film was released on April 18, 1941, by 20th Century Fox. It was part of the Cisco Kid series of films.

== Cast ==
- Cesar Romero as Cisco Kid
- Mary Beth Hughes as Sally
- Lynne Roberts as Marquerita
- Chris-Pin Martin as Gordito
- Robert Lowery as Carlos
- Ben Carter as Watchman
- William Demarest as Barney
- Robert Shaw as Cavalry Officer
- Edwin Maxwell as Clark
- Paul Sutton as Sleepy
- Don Costello as Redge
- Arthur Hohl as Sheriff
- Irving Bacon as Baldy
- Dick Rich as Curly
- Paul Harvey as Colonel
- Joan Woodbury as Dolores

Uncredited (in order of appearance)
James Flavin	Officer Johnson
Victor Potel	Ole
Alec Craig	Walter Limey
Max Wagner	partner
Jack Norton	town drunk
Eva Puig	Maria
Philip Van Zandt	town blacksmith
Frank Orth	auctioneer
Lee Shumway	bidder at auction
Hector V. Sarno	Miguel

== Bibliography ==
- Fetrow, Alan G. Feature Films, 1940-1949: a United States Filmography. McFarland, 1994.
