= Barbara Jean Wong =

American actress

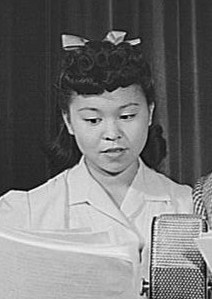
- Barbara Jean Wong in 1942
- Born: March 3, 1924; Los Angeles, California, U.S.
- Died: November 13, 1999 (aged 75); Tarzana, California, U.S.
- Other name: Barbara Jean Lee
- Education: University of Southern California; Columbia University
- Occupations: Actress, Elementary school teacher
- Years active: 1937–1965 (actress); 1970–1992 (teacher)
- Spouse: Robert Wah Lee (d.1988)
- Children: 4

Barbara Jean Wong (March 3, 1924 – November 13, 1999) was a Chinese American actress, known for her role as Arabella on the hugely popular radio comedy, Amos 'n' Andy.

She acted in numerous films before retiring from the industry and becoming an elementary school teacher.

== Early life and career ==
Wong was a fourth-generation Chinese American born in Los Angeles, California, to produce market owners Thomas and Maye Wong. She attended the Fanchon and Marco School of the Theater.

She began her performance career at the age of five, as she could read and had a clear voice, and was soon dubbed the Chinese American Shirley Temple because of her long black hair curled into ringlets and her charming persona.

As a youngster, Wong was also a dancer, performing at events such as a fashion show for charity in 1932 and a Hollywood Women's Club costume party in 1935.

Wong appeared in films as early as 1934, when she had "a featured bit" in The Painted Veil. In 1937, as a voice actress, she began performing in programs for CBS. She played Judy Barton, one of the twins in the children's Christmas old time radio show The Cinnamon Bear. She was heard on several episodes of the Lux Radio Theatre, Hallmark Playhouse, Hallmark Hall of Fame, Cavalcade of America, Three Thirds of a Nation, and many other shows.

Her biggest radio role was on the comedy show Amos 'n' Andy, in which she played Amos' daughter Arbadella. In October 1938, she began portraying the detective's oldest daughter in a new Charlie Chan radio series. She also played P.Y., a Chinese character, in I Love a Mystery on radio.

She attended the University of Southern California, where she earned a Bachelor of Arts degree in speech and drama, and Columbia University, where she gained a master of arts degree. After college, Jean (she used her middle name) began working in the movies and worked in 20 films, including The Good Earth, The Man from Button Willow, and Charlie Chan in Honolulu, in which she played the part of Charlie Chan's Number Three daughter. Wong also played a key supporting role in The Trap in 1946 which was the last Charlie Chan movie that featured Sidney Toler. Her last role was uncredited, a nurse in the motion picture Love Is a Many-Splendored Thing. Her featured-part movie career lasted from 1938 to 1955. In most of her movies, she was a backdrop, serving only as part of the scenery.

== Later years ==
After Wong married, she retired from acting and earned her teaching credentials from California State, Los Angeles. For 23 years, she taught elementary school before retiring in 1992. She was active on the boards of multiple Los Angeles organizations, including the El Pueblo Historical Monument and the Friends of the Chinese American Museum.

== Personal life ==
Wong was married to Robert Wah Lee, who died in 1988. They had four children.

== Death ==
Wong died of respiratory illness on November 13, 1999, in Tarzana, California, aged 75.

== Filmography ==
Year	Title	Role	Notes
1938	Charlie Chan in Honolulu	Chan Daughter	Uncredited
1943	China	Nan Ti	
1943	Behind the Rising Sun	Chinese Girl Given Opium	Uncredited
1944	Babes on Swing Street	Chinese Girl	Uncredited
1945	God Is My Co-Pilot	Chinese Nurse	Uncredited
1945	The Red Dragon	Iris Ling	
1946	The Trap	San Toy	
1946	That Brennan Girl	Nightclub Singer	Uncredited
1947	Calcutta	Mrs. Smith's Manicurist	Uncredited
1947	The Chinese Ring	Princess Mei Ling	
1948	The Golden Eye	Minor Role	(scenes deleted)
1949	Chinatown at Midnight	Betty Chang	
1951	China Corsair	Croupier	Uncredited
1955	Soldier of Fortune	Haka Girl	Uncredited
1955	Love Is a Many-Splendored Thing	Nurse	Uncredited
1965	The Man from Button Willow	Stormy	Voice, animated film
