= The Red Dragon (film) =

- Directed by: Phil Rosen
- Written by: George Callahan
- Produced by: James S. Burkett
- Starring: Sidney Toler; Benson Fong
- Cinematography: Vincent J. Farrar
- Edited by: Ace Herman
- Music by: Edward J. Kay
- Production company: Monogram Pictures
- Distributed by: Monogram Pictures
- Release date: February 2, 1946
- Running time: 62 minutes
- Country: United States
- Language: English

The Red Dragon is a 1946 mystery film starring Sidney Toler as Charlie Chan, with Benson Fong as Number Three Son Tommy and Willie Best as Chan's nervous chauffeur.

The role of Chan's chauffeur Birmingham Brown was traditionally played by comedian Mantan Moreland, but not in this film. Mantan Moreland and Ben Carter, seen in the previous Chan mystery The Scarlet Clue, became so popular as a comedy team that they embarked on a coast-to-coast personal-appearance tour for eight weeks, which is why Moreland was missing from the next two Chan pictures, The Red Dragon and Dangerous Money. Veteran African-American comic Willie Best substituted for him as Chattanooga Brown, Birmingham's cousin.

== Plot ==
Scientist Alfred Wyans of Mexico City has perfected a more powerful version of the atomic bomb. His assistant, Walter Dorn, fears for the formula's safety and telephones Charlie Chan to safeguard the formula. Wyans hosts a luncheon, where several international guests have been invited. By the time Chan arrives, however, a murder has been committed and the formula has disappeared. It develops that the various luncheon guests sought to purchase the secret formula. Scientist Wyans is himself killed, and during Chan's investigation he discovers that the fatal bullets were not fired by a gun. He also discovers that Walter Dorn had hidden the formula cleverly, by a means almost impossible to detect. Chan finds the remote-control mechanism that triggered the shots, and corners the murderer in a desperate gun battle.

== Cast ==
- Sidney Toler as Charlie Chan
- Benson Fong as Tommy Chan
- Willie Best as Chattanooga Brown
- Fortunio Bonanova as Insp. Luis Carvero
- Robert Emmett Keane as Alfred Wyans
- Carol Hughes as Marguerite Fontain
- Barton Yarborough as Joseph Brandish
- Don Costello as Charles Masack
- George Meeker as Edmond Slade
- Charles Trowbridge as Prentiss
- Marjorie Hoshelle as Countess Irena Masak
- Donald Dexter Taylor as Walter Dorn
- Mildred Boyd as Josephine
- Barbara Jean Wong as Iris Ling (as Jean Wong)

== Reception ==
The Red Dragon was generally considered a step down for the Charlie Chan series. Trade publisher Pete Harrison was frank: "Not much can be said for this latest in the Charlie Chan program detective series. The story is so far-fetched, and the direction and performances are so ordinary, [that] by the time Chan solves the mystery at the finish, one's interest in the solution is gone. All in all, the picture is way below par for the series." Film Bulletin agreed: "Below par Charlie Chan entry. Charlie Chan merely ambles through this routine mystery programmer, which will get by in the lesser action spots." Showmen's Trade Review elaborated on the problems: "The picture is a minor offering, not up to the usual standard of previous films in the series, due to the lack of action -- most of the film's footage is confined to a small area -- and the implausibility of the story. However, there's enough suspense in the mysterious happenings to hold the interest throughout, which should give the average audience and the Chan followers some degree of entertainment. Sidney Toler appears to live the part of Chan, for he's smooth and natural in the part." William R. Weaver of Motion Picture Daily, noting that a key plot point was unfairly withheld from the viewer, gave Toler the benefit of the doubt: "Sidney Toler's portrayal of Charlie Chan is perhaps the best he has given, and it is his performance that carries the picture. The script commits the professional offense of solving the accumulated murder mysteries by post-climax revelation of an explanation not previously present in the story. Presumably the Chan followers will settle for the Toler characterization, however, which is what counts."

== Home media ==
The Red Dragon has been released on DVD.
