= To the Ends of the Earth (1948 film) =

1948 film by Robert Stevenson

- Lobby card
- Directed by: Robert Stevenson
- Written by: Jay Richard Kennedy; Sidney Buchman
- Produced by: Sidney Buchman
- Starring: Dick Powell; Signe Hasso; Ludwig Donath
- Cinematography: Burnett Guffey
- Edited by: William A. Lyon
- Music by: George Duning
- Production company: Kennedy-Buckman Pictures
- Distributed by: Columbia Pictures
- Release date: February 12, 1948
- Running time: 109 minutes
- Country: United States
- Language: English
- Box office: $1.7 million (US rentals)

To the Ends of the Earth is a 1948 American film noir thriller film directed by Robert Stevenson and starring Dick Powell, Signe Hasso and Ludwig Donath. It was released by Columbia Pictures.

== Plot ==
In 1935, United States Narcotics Agent Michael Barrows (Powell) is assigned to find an unidentified freighter suspected of smuggling drugs. When he and the Coast Guard spot it along the California coast, they give chase. Barrows watches helplessly through binoculars as the freighter captain has about a hundred chained slave laborers thrown overboard to drown. The ship escapes by passing beyond the 12-mile limit and entering international waters. Horrified by what he has seen, Barrows determines to smash the narcotics ring – traveling "to the ends of the Earth" if need be – without first clearing it with his boss, Commissioner H. J. Anslinger (played by the real Harry J. Anslinger).

The trail leads him to Shanghai, where his Chinese counterpart, Commissioner Lum Chi Chow (Vladimir Sokoloff), has obtained information from a dying man. The man had escaped from a slave labor gang growing poppies somewhere in Egypt. Lum Chi Chow believes that once the poppies are harvested within the next few days, they will be smuggled into Shanghai for final processing. Suspicion falls on Nicholas Sokim (Ludwig Donath), as he has a criminal record, but he claims to have been out of the drug business for many years. During his investigation, Barrows meets recent widow Ann Grant (Signe Hasso), who is preparing to send orphan Chinese teenager Shu Pan Wu (Maylia) to the safety of the United States. When a drug processing lab is discovered beneath Sokim's business, Sokim commits suicide.

With time running out, and the trail going cold, Barrows travels to Egypt to search for the hidden poppy fields. There, he teams up with British Commissioner Lionel Hadley (an uncredited Vernon Steele) and French Commissioner Lariesier (Marcel Journet). They managed to locate the poppy fields on land belonging to Binda Sha (Fritz Leiber). Barrows is disturbed to learn that the irrigation system for the fields was set up by Ann Grant's late engineer husband. When Binda Sha realizes he has been caught, he throws himself off a cliff to his death.

Meanwhile, the unprocessed drugs are smuggled to Beirut in the stomachs of camels. The camels are slaughtered and the drugs retrieved. An alert agent spots them being transferred to innocent-looking butter containers sent aboard a ship bound for New York via Havana under the watchful eye of Naftalie Vrandstadter (an uncredited Ivan Triesault).

Barrows boards the ship and once again encounters Ann Grant and Shu Pan Wu; the latter seems to have developed a schoolgirl crush for him. As they near New York, the drugs disappear under cover of a fire, despite the vigilance of Barrows' planted agents. Barrows figures out that they were thrown overboard attached to weights. The ropes are treated so that they will part after a certain time, allowing the drugs to resurface and be picked up. Barrows summons the Coast Guard, who capture the drug ring's boat and the drugs. He takes the recovered packages and heads to shore with Ann and Shu Pan Wu. Shu Pan Wu steals a revolver and orders the crew to sail to a different location. When Barrows advances on her, she shoots him without hesitation, however, the gun is loaded with blanks, as the treasury agent had grown suspicious of her. Shu Pan Wu turns out to be the adult leader of the ring.

== Cast ==
- Dick Powell as Commissioner Michael Barrows
- Signe Hasso as Ann Grant
- Maylia as Shu Pan Wu
- Ludwig Donath as Nicholas Sokim
- Vladimir Sokoloff as Commissioner Lum Chi Chow
- Edgar Barrier as Grieg
- John Hoyt as Bennett
- Marcel Journet as Commissioner Lariesier
- Luis Van Rooten as Alberto Berado
- Fritz Leiber as Binda Sha
- Michael Raffetto – Professor Salim (uncredited)

== Reception ==
When the film was first released Thomas M. Pyror of The New York Times gave it a mixed review, and wrote, "To the Ends of the Earth, for all the journalistic austerity of its introductory sequences inside the narcotics division of the Treasury Department and at the United Nations council table in Lake Success, is predominantly a cops-and-robbers tale that relies too heavily on physical violence to make its impress. Unfortunately, this heightens the synthetic flavor of the picture and accounts in large measure for the attitudinized nature of the story's development that lessens its over-all dramatic impact...The author of all this, Mr. Kennedy, has concocted a highly involved and complicated screen play that sparkles and sputters as far as dramatic effectiveness goes, and thereby imposes an average look upon a picture which, with a little more resourcefulness, might easily have been distinctive."

The staff at TV Guide liked the film and wrote, "An engrossing, globetrotting semi-documentary on the evils of narcotics pushers, specifically those who try smuggling opium onto U.S. shores...The chief factor in the film's success as an adventure picture is the realistic documentary approach."

The film opened February 12, 1948 and was the number one film at the US box office for the week.
