= Richard Cahoon =

American film editor (1905–1985)

- Born: October 1, 1905; Italy
- Died: September 19, 1985 (aged 79); Los Angeles, California, United States
- Occupation: Editor
- Years active: 1929-1970

Richard Cahoon (October 1, 1905 — September 19, 1985) was an American editor of both film and television. During his career he edited over 40 feature films, and over a dozen television series. His work earned him an Emmy nomination and two Eddie Awards.

== Career ==
Cahoon's film career began at Universal Studios with his work on the 1929 William Wyler melodrama, The Shakedown. It was one of five films he would work on that year, including the comedy, The Cohens and Kellys in Atlantic City, In 1930, Cahoon became engaged to Margaret Pickstone. In the 1930s, some of the notable films on which he worked include: the Technicolor film Mamba (1930), starring Jean Hersholt; the World War I drama, The Mad Parade (1931), with a cast consisting entirely of women; the 1931 B film drama, Men in Her Life; Air Hostess, a 1933 melodrama directed by Albert Rogell; the 1934 drama Whirlpool, starring Jack Holt and Jean Arthur; two 1934 features starring Fay Wray, Black Moon and Once to Every Woman; the 1935 aviation drama, Air Hawks, which featured Wiley Post in his only screen performance; the 1935 adaptation of the Russian classic of the same name, Crime and Punishment, directed by Josef von Sternberg; and The Mysterious Avenger (1936), a B-film directed by David Selman and starring Charles Starrett. After 1936, Cahoon's career cooled off a bit, and he would only edit 3 films between 1936 and the end of the 1940s, including the final two films in the Scattergood Baines film series: Scattergood Survives a Murder and Cinderella Swings It.

In the mid-1950s, Cahoon reinvigorated his career. After editing the Maureen O'Hara and Anthony Quinn film, The Magnificent Matador in 1955, he began working in the medium for which he achieved his greatest success: television. That same year he would edit the premiere episode of the short-lived television series, Luke and the Tenderfoot, titled "The Boston Kid". After editing The Indian Fighter, starring Kirk Douglas and Walter Matthau, and Navy Wife, starring Joan Bennett, Gary Merrill, and Shirley Yamaguchi, Cahoon would spend the remainder of his career focusing on the small screen.

After working on several television shows in the mid and late 1950s, including You Are There, Broken Arrow, How to Marry a Millionaire, and Tombstone Territory, Cahoon spent 9 years editing Perry Mason, for which he worked during the entire run of the series. In 1961, Cahoon would be nominated for an Emmy for his editing on the series, although he would lose to the editors of the Naked City. During the rest of the 1960s he would work on several other television series, including Twelve O'Clock High, The Fugitive, and I Spy. His final editing position was on the television series, Medical Center, for which he would win two Eddie Awards, in 1971 and 1972.

== Filmography ==
=== Feature films ===
(Per AFI database)

- The Cohens and Kellys in Atlantic City (1929)
- College Love (1929)
- Painted Faces (1929)
- The Shakedown (1929)
- Border Romance (1930)
- Mamba (1930)
- The Swellhead (1930)
- Aloha (1931)
- The Mad Parade (1931)
- Men in Her Life (1931)
- A Private Scandal (1931)
- Igloo (1932)
- Washington Merry-Go-Round (1932)
- Air Hostess (1933)
- The Circus Queen Murder (1933)
- East of Fifth Avenue (1933)
- Fog (1933)
- The Wrecker (1933)
- The Prescott Kid (1934)
- The Most Precious Thing in Life (1934)
- Whirlpool (1934)
- Black Moon (1934)
- I'll Fix It (1934)
- Once to Every Woman (1934)
- Crime and Punishment (1935)
- The Black Room (1935)
- Air Hawks (1935)
- Carnival (1935)
- I'll Love You Always (1935)
- Behind the Evidence (1935)
- She Married Her Boss (1935)
- Pride of the Marines (1936)
- Counterfeit (1936)
- The Mysterious Avenger (1936)
- Scattergood Survives a Murder (1942)
- Cinderella Swings It (1943)
- Massacre River (1949)
- The Magnificent Matador (1955)
- The Indian Fighter (1955)
- Navy Wife (1956)
- Three for Jamie Dawn (1956)
- Hidden Fear (1957)

=== Television programs ===
- Luke and the Tenderfoot (1955)
- You Are There (1956–57)
- The 20th Century-Fox Hour (1957)
- Broken Arrow (1957–58)
- How to Marry a Millionaire (1958)
- The Third Man (1959)
- Tombstone Territory (1959)
- Perry Mason (1957–1966)
- 12 O'Clock High (1966)
- The Invaders (1967)
- The Fugitive (1966–67)
- I Spy (1967–68)
- The High Chaparral (1969–70)
- Medical Center (1970)

== Death ==
Cahoon died on September 10, 1985, aged 79, in Los Angeles, California.
