= Whirlpool (1934 film) =

1934 film by Roy William Neill

- Directed by: Roy William Neill
- Screenplay by: Dorothy Howell; Ethel Hill
- Based on: Howard Emmett Rogers (story)
- Produced by: Robert North
- Starring: Jack Holt; Jean Arthur and Donald Cook
- Cinematography: Benjamin H. Kline
- Edited by: Richard Cahoon
- Distributed by: Columbia Pictures Corporation
- Release date: April 10, 1934
- Running time: 80 min.
- Country: United States
- Language: English

Whirlpool is a 1934 American pre-Code drama film directed by Roy William Neill and starring Jack Holt and Jean Arthur. The screenplay concerns a carnival owner convicted of manslaughter after a man is killed in a fight.

== Plot ==
Buck Rankin is a shady carnival promoter who falls in love with Helen and decides to go straight and sell the carnival. However, a fight over a con game causes a melee at the carnival, during which Rankin accidentally kills a man. He is convicted of manslaughter and sentenced to 20 years in prison. Eight months later, Helen reveals to him in prison that she is pregnant with his child and refuses his request that she divorce him.

For the good of his wife and child, Rankin decides to fake his own death. After seeing fellow prisoner Farley leap to his death in the roiling waters and deadly whirlpool surrounding the prison, Rankin forges a letter to Helen—on the warden's stationery—informing her that Rankin died while attempting to escape and that his body had not been found.

Many years later, Rankin is released from prison. He adopts the alias Duke Sheldon and, with his carnival partner Mac, becomes wealthy by using the gambling skills that Rankin learned while incarcerated. Helen has since married judge Jim Morrison. Sandy, Rankin's daughter by Helen, is a newspaper reporter engaged to marry fellow reporter Bob Andrews, but she knows nothing of her father's existence.

Sandy is assigned to write a story on Duke and recognizes him as her father from an old photograph that Helen has kept. She reveals herself to him as his daughter, and tough guy Duke melts. They become inseparable, and spend as much time together as possible: at lunch and dinner dates, at sporting events and amusement centers, and in quiet interludes. Sandy's continual late nights, and mysterious comings and goings with an unknown man, disturb her mother and worry her fiancé.

Despite having kept a low profile, Duke is expected to testify on behalf of a fellow gangster, which will court unwanted publicity that could humiliate Helen, who is unintentionally guilty of bigamy because she and Buck Rankin were never officially divorced.

Duke refuses to testify. The gangster's lawyer pressures him and intends to inform reporters of Duke's sordid past as Buck Rankin. Duke struggles with the lawyer and the gun goes off, killing the lawyer. The reporters hear the shot and head for Duke's office. Before they arrive, Duke spirits Sandy, Bob, and Mac away to safety, and then turns the gun on himself—the secret of his past life hidden forever, for the sake of his loved ones.

== Cast ==
- Jack Holt as Buck Rankin/Duke Sheldon
- Jean Arthur as Sandy
- Donald Cook as Bob Andrews
- Allen Jenkins as Mac
- Lila Lee as Helen Rankin Morrison
- John Miljan as Barney Gaige
- Rita La Roy as Thelma
- Oscar Apfel as Newspaper Editor
- Willard Robertson as Judge Jim Morrison
- Ward Bond as Farley

== Reception ==
Whirlpool received excellent notices. Jack Holt was well established as the tough-guy leading man of action pictures, while Jean Arthur was a new face just signed by Columbia Pictures. Critics noted Arthur's sincerity and sympathy, and marveled at Holt's displays of tenderness and compassion never before seen in his two-fisted melodramas. The Hollywood Reporter observed, "Particularly touching and well done are his scenes with his daughter. He is given splendid assistance by Jean Arthur, and by the director, Roy William Neill. Without overplaying or mawkish sentimentality, these scenes have a natural, human quality that counts."

Arthur's success in Whirlpool had a salutary effect on the actress's outlook, according to Picture Play: "Her entire personality has changed, and from a somewhat immature actress of nice but no startling ability she has blossomed into a distinctive artist, and only the future can tell how high she will soar... [She] now receives, from Whirlpool alone, approval that any far more experienced actress might spend years in building up."
