= Pride of the Marines (1936 film) =

1936 film

- Film poster
- Directed by: D. Ross Lederman
- Screenplay by: Harold Shumate
- Based on: Pride of the Marines; 1921 story in Red Book Magazine by Gerald Beaumont
- Produced by: Robert North
- Starring: Charles Bickford
- Cinematography: Benjamin H. Kline
- Edited by: Richard Cahoon
- Distributed by: Columbia Pictures
- Release date: April 2, 1936
- Running time: 64 minutes
- Country: United States
- Language: English

Pride of the Marines is a 1936 American comedy film directed by D. Ross Lederman.

== Cast ==
- Charles Bickford as Steve Riley
- Florence Rice as Molly Malone
- Robert Allen as Larry Allen
- Thurston Hall as Col. Gage
- Ward Bond as Gunner Brady
- George McKay as Mac McCabe
- Joe Sawyer as Tennessee
