= Bells of San Fernando =

1947 film by Terry O. Morse

- Theatrical release poster
- Directed by: Terry O. Morse
- Written by: Jack DeWitt; Duncan Renaldo
- Produced by: James S. Burkett
- Starring: Donald Woods; Gloria Warren; Shirley O'Hara; Byron Foulger
- Cinematography: Robert Pittack
- Edited by: George McGuire
- Music by: Rudy De Saxe
- Production company: Hillcrest Productions
- Distributed by: Screen Guild Productions
- Release date: March 1, 1947 (United States)
- Running time: 75 minutes
- Country: United States
- Language: English

Bells of San Fernando is a 1947 American historical romantic adventure film directed by Terry O. Morse and starring Donald Woods, Gloria Warren and Shirley O'Hara. Duncan Renaldo co-wrote the screenplay and was an associate producer of the film.It was released as a second feature.

== Plot summary ==
During the period of New Spain, the dictatorial Juan Mendoza, overseer of the San Fernando Valley seals the area off and forbids anyone to enter or leave. When he seeks to marry Maria Garcia, daughter of the blacksmith, her Irish boyfriend Michael O'Brien challenges Mendoza.

At the same time a small vein of gold in the area is discovered with the gold concealed inside a church bell.

Michael and Maria seek to escape to Monterey to seek the help of the Governor of Alta California.

== Cast ==
- Donald Woods as Michael "Gringo" O'Brien
- Gloria Warren as Maria Garcia
- Byron Foulger as Francisco Garcia, Mission Blacksmith
- Shirley O'Hara as Nita
- Anthony Warde as Juan Mendoza, Overseer
- Monte Blue as Governor Don Sebastian Fernando
- Paul Newlan as Gueyon, Garcia's Assistant
- David Leonard as Father Xavier
- Gordon B. Clarke as Henchman Enrico
- Frank Cody as Henchman Junipero
- Lusita Triana as Spanish Dancer
- Felipe Turich as Pablo, the traitor
- Claire Du Brey as Manta
- Gil Frye as Governor's Secretary
- Ray Dolciame as 1st Clerk, Governor's Office
- John Parker as 2nd Clerk, Governor's Office

== Soundtrack ==
- Gloria Warren – "Land of My Dreams" (written by Marian Boyle and Don Roland)
- Donald Woods – "Green Grow the Rushes, O" (Irish folk song)
