= Gloria Warren =

American actress and singer (1926–2021)

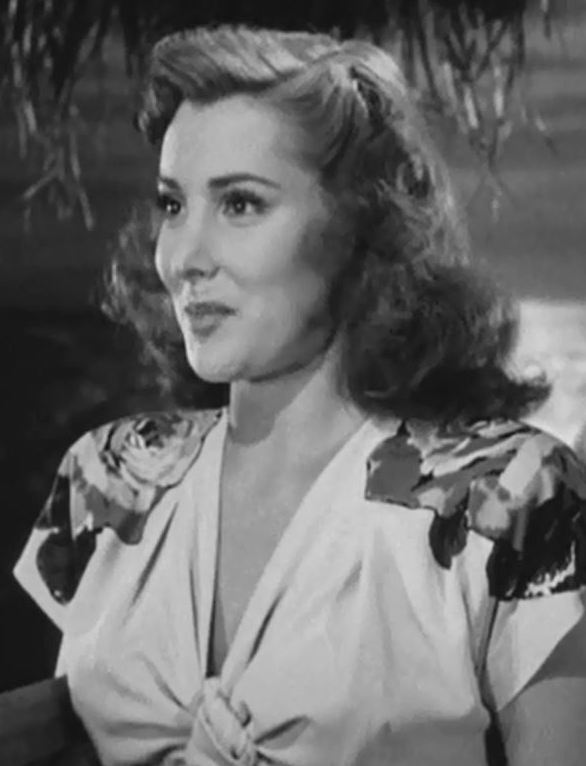
- Warren in Dangerous Money (1946)
- Born: Gloria Weiman; April 7, 1926; Wilmington, Delaware, U.S.
- Died: September 11, 2021 (aged 95); Los Angeles, California, U.S.
- Occupations: Film actress; soprano singer; philanthropist
- Years active: 1942–1947
- Spouse: Peter Gold (m. 1946, died 2010)
- Children: 2

Gloria Warren (née Weiman; April 7, 1926 – September 11, 2021) was an American actress, soprano singer, and philanthropist.

== Early years ==
Warren was born Gloria Weiman on April 7, 1926 in Wilmington, Delaware. Her mother, Julia Weiss Weiman, was from Budapest, Hungary, and her father, Herman Weiman, a jeweler and watchmaker, was from Poland. Warner Brothers insisted that she change her last name to Warren when she signed with them in 1941 at age 15, so her parents and sister, June, agreed to change their last names too. She started playing the piano at age eight, and was considered a prodigy by the time she was nine years old. She attended Warner Junior High School in Wilmington, Delaware.

== Career ==
Gloria Warren was "discovered" in 1940, after her mother, Julia, convinced radio producer Charles Martin to let Gloria perform for him. It was the Golden Age of Radio, and Martin, who was always looking for new talent, was extremely impressed with Gloria's beautiful soprano voice, and how well she played the piano and danced. He immediately alerted his friend and associate Beatrice Kaufman about the talented teenager. Beatrice Kaufman, who was the wife of the famous playwright George S. Kaufman, had a long history in the publishing and entertainment businesses--she had been a writer, playwright, book and magazine editor, and story editor for the film producer Samuel Goldwyn. In 1925, she edited Ernest Hemingway's short story collection, In Our Time, which would become the author's first published work. When her publishing company bosses were hesitating about publishing the book, she convinced them to believe in the new writer. And in 1940, she would play a very large role in Gloria Warren's film career becoming a reality. It was a period when film studios were making a great deal of money producing musicals starring young actresses like Judy Garland, Deanna Durbin, and Shirley Temple, and Beatrice Kaufman was convinced that the teenage soprano singer and concert pianist had the talent, looks, and charm to have a successful career in Hollywood.

Kaufman introduced Gloria and her parents to her friend, theatrical agent Gummo Marx. Marx had left his brothers’ famous comedy act, the Marx Brothers, several years before because performing wasn’t something he enjoyed doing. He represented many well-known writers and actors, including his brothers, and Gloria became his new client. Marx convinced legendary producer Hal B. Wallis, who was the production chief and executive producer at Warner Brothers, that Gloria was the singing teenage ingenue the studio needed, and the studio signed her to a 7 year film contract. In 1941, her parents, Julia and Herman, and her sister, June, made the move from Wilmington, Delaware to Hollywood, California so Gloria could begin her new career. She was 15 years old. Soon she was attending school with other child actors on the Warner Brothers studio lot, and along with her family, had fallen in love with California.

In 1942, Gloria appeared in her first motion picture, Always in My Heart, co-starring with two of Warner Brothers' most popular actors, Kay Francis and Walter Huston. The film was written specifically with Gloria in mind and she received praise for her debut.

In 1943, Gloria Warren appeared on Broadway as one of the stars of the musical “What’s Up,” which was the first Broadway stage collaboration of composer Frederick Loewe and lyricist Alan Jay Lerner.

Also in 1943, Gloria Warren starred in Cinderella Swings It opposite Guy Kibbee. In 1946 she starred in the film Don't Gamble with Strangers, and that year was cast in a smaller role in the Charlie Chan film Dangerous Money. Her last film was Bells of San Fernando (1947), in which she shared top billing with Donald Woods. She retired from film acting afterwards. Her singing voice was often compared to that of Deanna Durbin.

== Personal life ==
She married businessman Peter Gold in 1946. They had two children together, Melinda Gold Wiltsie and Daniel Gold. They regularly donated to Pitzer College. Peter died on April 17, 2010, at the age of 85.

Gloria Warren died in Los Angeles, California, on September 11, 2021, at the age of 95.

== Filmography ==
- Always in My Heart (1942)
- Cinderella Swings It (1943)
- Dangerous Money (1946)
- Don't Gamble with Strangers (1946)
- Bells of San Fernando (1947)
