= Don't Gamble with Strangers =

1946 film

- Theatrical poster
- Directed by: William Beaudine
- Written by: Caryl Coleman; Harvey Gates
- Produced by: Jeffrey Bernerd
- Starring: Kane Richmond; Bernadene Hayes; Peter Cookson; Gloria Warren; Charles Trowbridge
- Cinematography: William A. Sickner
- Edited by: William Austin
- Music by: Edward J. Kay
- Production company: Monogram Pictures
- Distributed by: Monogram Pictures
- Release date: August 24, 1946
- Running time: 68 minutes
- Country: United States
- Language: English

Don't Gamble with Strangers is a 1946 American crime drama film directed by William Beaudine.

== Plot ==
Two card sharks, pretending to be brother and sister, clean out a small-town banker, then take over a crooked gambling joint.

== Cast ==
- Kane Richmond as Mike Sarno
- Bernadene Hayes as Fay Benton
- Peter Cookson as Bob Randall
- Gloria Warren as Ruth Hamilton
- Charles Trowbridge as Creighton
- Frank Dae as John Randall
- Anthony Caruso as Pinky Luiz
- Philip Van Zandt as Morelli

== Production ==
Don't Gamble with Strangers was the first film produced by Jeffrey Bernerd under his five-picture contract for Monogram, and filming began in mid-March, 1946.
