= Dink Trout =

American actor (1898–1950)

- Born: June 18, 1898; Beardstown, Illinois, U.S.
- Died: March 26, 1950 (aged 51); Los Angeles, California, U.S.
- Occupations: Film actor radio personality voice actor
- Years active: 1926–1950

Dink Trout (June 18, 1898 – March 26, 1950) was an American actor, voice artist and radio personality.

== Biography ==
=== Early years ===
Traut attended the University of Illinois, where he performed as a comedian on campus alongside George Chandler, entertaining his fellow classmates.

=== Career ===
Much of Trout's career involved playing characters in American radio shows. He was heard as Waldo Binney on The Life of Riley, as Mr. Anderson on The Dennis Day Show and as Luke Spears on Lum and Abner. He was also heard in The Adventures of Ozzie and Harriet, the Cass Daley Show, The Nebbs, and The Jim Backus Show.

On Broadway, Trout had the role of Zappo in a 1926 stage adaptation of The Wild Rose. In 1927, Trout had his own musical program on WOR in Newark, New Jersey. Trout also played marimba and trombone for Ben Bernie and his orchestra.

In 1936, Trout made his first (uncredited) film appearance in Under Your Spell. Later, in 1941, he appeared in Scattergood Baines as Plinky Pickett. Trout reprised this role for the next two films in the Scattergood Baines chronology. He made several other film appearances throughout his life, though he was generally uncredited. In 1947, he voiced the title character in Disney's Bootle Beetle, a character he continued to voice for the next three years. He also played Phink, the pressure cooker salesman in the unaired Three Stooges TV pilot, Jerks of All Trades. His final performance was as the voice of the King of Hearts in Alice in Wonderland, which was released over a year after his death.

== Death ==
Trout died on March 26, 1950, after undergoing two surgeries for throat cancer. He was 51 years old.

== Filmography ==
- Under Your Spell (1936) - Small Man (uncredited)
- Scattergood Baines (1941) - Pliny Pickett
- Scattergood Baines Pulls the Strings (1941) - Pliny Pickett
- Miss Polly (1941) - Postman Wilbur Boggs
- Cinderella Swings It (1943) - Pliny Pickett
- Gildersleeve's Bad Day (1943) - Otis (uncredited)
- It's a Great Life (1943) - Little Man (uncredited)
- Food and Magic (1943, Documentary short) - Meek Butcher Customer (uncredited)
- Up in Arms (1944) - Startled Man in Cable Car (uncredited)
- The Doughgirls (1944) - Young Husband (uncredited)
- Irish Eyes Are Smiling (1944) - Meek Husband (uncredited)
- A Tree Grows in Brooklyn (1945) - Undetermined (uncredited)
- Sudan (1945) - Bedai the Potter (uncredited)
- The Horn Blows at Midnight (1945) - Trumpet Player (uncredited)
- Notorious (1946) - Court Clerk (uncredited)
- Bootle Beetle (1947, short) - Bootle Beetle (voice)
- So Dear to My Heart (1948) - Bob Peters - Station Agent (uncredited)
- Sea Salts (1949, short) - 'Mac' Bootle Beetle (voice, uncredited)
- Jerks of All Trades (1949, TV pilot) - Mr. Phink
- The Greener Yard (1949, short) - Bootle Beetle (voice)
- Morris the Midget Moose (1950, short) - Old Bootle Beetle / Balsam (voice, posthumous release, uncredited)
- Alice in Wonderland (1951) - King of Hearts (voice, posthumous release, final film role)
