= Scattergood Baines =

1941 film by Christy Cabanne

- Directed by: Christy Cabanne
- Written by: Michael L. Simmons
- Produced by: Jerrold T. Brandt
- Starring: Guy Kibbee; Carol Hughes; John Archer
- Cinematography: Jack MacKenzie
- Edited by: Henry Berman
- Production company: Pyramid Productions
- Distributed by: RKO Radio Pictures
- Release date: February 21, 1941
- Running time: 69 minutes
- Country: United States
- Language: English

Scattergood Baines is a 1941 American comedy drama film directed by Christy Cabanne and starring Guy Kibbee, Carol Hughes and John Archer. It is based on a novel by Clarence Budington Kelland. The character of Scattergood was also popular during the days of live radio. Five other Scattergood Baines films, all starring Guy Kibbee, were subsequently made including Scattergood Pulls the Strings and Scattergood Meets Broadway which were released later the same year.

== Plot ==
Scattergood Baines chooses the small New England town of Cold River to settle down in. Twenty years later, he has outmaneuvered the townspeople both when it comes to large matters (ownership of the local railroad) and small (the pretty new schoolteacher's hair).

== Cast ==
- Guy Kibbee as Scattergood Baines
- Carol Hughes as Helen Parker
- John Archer as Johnny Bones
- Dink Trout as Pliny Pickett
- Emma Dunn as Mirandy Baines
- Willie Best as Hipp
- Fern Emmett as Clara Potts
- Lee 'Lasses' White as Ed Potts
- Kate Harrington as Gertrude Brown
- Joseph Crehan as Keith
- Edward Earle as Crane
- Bradley Page as McKettrick
- Paul White as Young Hipp
- Earle Hodgins as Jim Barton

== Background ==
The homespun but canny Baines was originally created by popular writer Clarence Budington Kelland in stories for The Saturday Evening Post, and a radio version ran from 1938 through 1950.

== Bibliography ==
- Erickson, Hal. From Radio to the Big Screen: Hollywood Films Featuring Broadcast Personalities and Programs. McFarland, 2014.
- Fetrow, Alan G. Feature Films, 1940-1949: a United States Filmography. McFarland, 1994.
