= The Man from Button Willow =

1965 film

- Directed by: David Detiege
- Written by: David Detiege
- Produced by: Phyllis Bounds Detiege
- Starring: Dale Robertson; Edgar Buchanan; Howard Keel; Barbara Jean Wong
- Music by: George Stoll; Robert Van Eps
- Distributed by: Eagle Films; United Screen Arts
- Release date: April 3, 1965
- Running time: 81 minutes
- Country: United States
- Language: English

The Man from Button Willow is a 1965 American animated Western film about the adventures of Justin Eagle, the first U.S. government agent. It was released in the United States on April 3, 1965.

== Plot ==
During construction of the first transcontinental railroad, unscrupulous land grabbers are buying up land on which the railroad is to be built, forcing the U.S. government to purchase it at inflated prices. The government has deployed Senate investigators to put a stop to this, and has assembled a team of men who work in secret to protect them. One such man is Justin Eagle, who operates from his ranch, the Eagle's Nest, near the town of Button Willow in the Sierra Nevada foothills.

Justin returns from business in San Francisco, reuniting with his adopted Japanese daughter Stormy and ranch hand Jeremiah "Sorry" Baker. Justin notes the presence in town of land grabber Montgomery Blaine and his henchman "the Whip". Justin's mare, Savannah, gives birth to a foal sired by his stallion, Rebel. The foal escapes the ranch and goes up a nearby mountain, accompanied by Justin's dog Shady and pet skunk, Alfie. When the foal is attacked by a cougar, Rebel rushes to the rescue and fights the predator off; Shady is injured but survives.

Justin learns from general store proprietor Abner Hawkins that several settlers have recently had their homes burned and been chased off their land, and that Senator Freeman is in San Francisco to investigate. The senator soon disappears; without his vote, the settlers will lose their land to land grabbers. Justin's contact sends word to him via homing pigeon, summoning him to San Francisco. There, he informs Justin that Senator Freeman has proof that Blaine has cheated and driven hundreds of settlers off their lands. The senator has been kidnapped and is being held on a ship, but it is not known which one. Once the ship is at sea, the senator will be murdered.

Following a tip to a saloon, Justin observes the proprietor, "Shanghai" Kelly, shanghai a sailor. Starting a fight as cover, Justin follows Kelly but falls through a trap door into a rowboat and is himself shanghaied by a ship captain. The ship sets sail, and Justin finds Senator Freeman captive aboard. With the help of kidnapped sailor Andy Svenson, Justin attacks the crew, knocking most of them overboard. They force the captain to sail the ship back to San Francisco.

Returning home, Justin is welcomed by Stormy and Sorry. Blaine and the Whip are imprisoned for their crimes.

== Voice cast ==
- Dale Robertson as Justin Eagle, and as himself in the live-action prologue
- Edgar Buchanan as Jeremiah "Sorry" Baker
- Howard Keel sings the theme song "The Man from Button Willow".
- Barbara Jean Wong as Stormy
- Herschel Bernardi as the ship captain, and as a man in the saloon
- Pinto Colvig as Abner Hawkins, as well as a man on a trolley, a man in the saloon, and various animals
- Ross Martin as Andy Svenson
- Cliff Edwards as Button Willow's doctor "Doc" Redland, and as "the Whip"
- Verna Felton as Mrs. Pomeroy of Button Willow, as Doc's wife, and as a lady on a trolley
- Thurl Ravenscroft as the Reverend of Button Willow, and as a man in the saloon
- Shep Menken as "Shanghai" Kelly, as the Chinese singer in the saloon, as a man in the saloon, and as a trolley conductor
- John Hiestand as Montgomery Blaine, and as an old salt who gives Justin a tip
- Clarence Nash as Senator Freeman, and as the cougar
- Edward Platt as "the man in the black cape", Justin's contact in San Francisco
- Buck Buchanan as Doc's son, and as a newspaper hawker

== Production ==
According to the film's pressbook, Dale Robertson provided the original story, appears in the live-action prologue, and financed the film though his company, United Screen Arts.

== Music ==
All tracks are written by George Bruns and Phyllis Bounds-Detiege.

No.	Title	Length
1.	"The Man from Button Willow"
2.	"Excuse Me, Ma'am"
3.	"A Bright and Early Moring on the Farm"
4.	"By Golly"

== Reception ==
Common Sense Media noted in their review that the film is romantic and ethnocentric in its depiction of American superiority; some of the Native American and Asian characters would be considered stereotypes by today's standards.
