= Maylia =

American actress

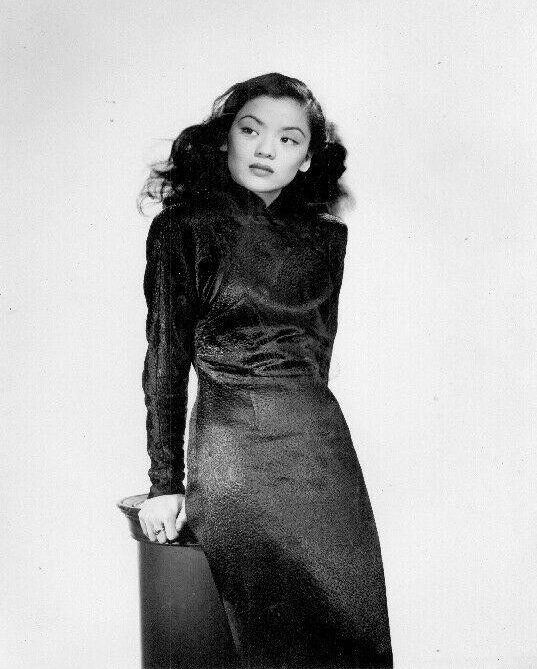
- Maylia in a publicity photo for To the Ends of the Earth (1948)
- Born: Gloria Suie Chin; November 10, 1925; Detroit, Michigan, U.S.
- Died: October 16, 2016 (aged 90); Costa Mesa, California, U.S.
- Occupation: Actress
- Years active: 1947–1953
- Spouse: Benson Fong (m. 1946; died 1987)
- Children: 5

Gloria Suie Chin (Chinese: 鄺美麗; (Note: She is mostly known in Chinese media as 陳美麗.) November 10, 1925 – October 16, 2016), known professionally as Maylia, was an American actress. She was one of the few Asian-American actresses working in Hollywood during the late 1940s.

== Acting career ==
Twenty-one-year-old Gloria Chin was visiting her sister in California when she was spotted in a Paramount studios canteen by the wife of producer Sidney Buchman. She was cast in her first film as the character Ming Ling in the romantic film Singapore (1947), starring Ava Gardner and Fred MacMurray. She was billed on screen under the single name "Maylia", and was promoted as the “first Chinese starlet since Anna May Wong” by Paramount's publicity department.

After a successful reception in Singapore, Maylia was featured as a Chinese orphan in To the Ends of the Earth (1948) starring Dick Powell and Signe Hasso. Maylia then appeared in Boston Blackie's Chinese Venture (1949), and Chinatown at Midnight (1949). She appeared without credit in Call Me Mister (1951) and Return to Paradise (1953).

== As restaurateur ==
She and her husband, screen actor Benson Fong, successfully ran a chain of Chinese restaurants in Los Angeles County called Ah Fong. In 1949, they had saved up enough money to open their first restaurant location in Hollywood, California, on Vine Street. By 1971, the chain had locations in Hollywood, Anaheim, Encino, Westwood, and Beverly Hills.

In 1984, the restaurant received a favorable recommendation in the Los Angeles Times as a place for Mother's Day lunch.

She and her husband stopped managing the chain in 1985, shortly before her husband's death in 1987. In 1987, only one location remained in Hollywood and was being managed by a relative.

== Personal life ==
Gloria Fong retired from acting in 1953 to focus on her family. She had five children with her husband Benson. Their names are Cynthia Fong (b. 1948), Preston Oden Fong (b. February 1950), Lori Fong (b. 1951), Pamela Fong (b. 1953), and Lisa Fong (b. 1957). Three of her five children (Pamela, Kwong, and Lisa) are also actors. Fong also had nine grandchildren at the time of her death in 2016.

== Death ==
Gloria Fong died in her sleep at her home in Costa Mesa, California, on October 16, 2016. She was survived by her five children and nine grandchildren. Per her last wishes, she was cremated and her ashes scattered at sea.
