= Willie Best =

American actor (1913–1962)

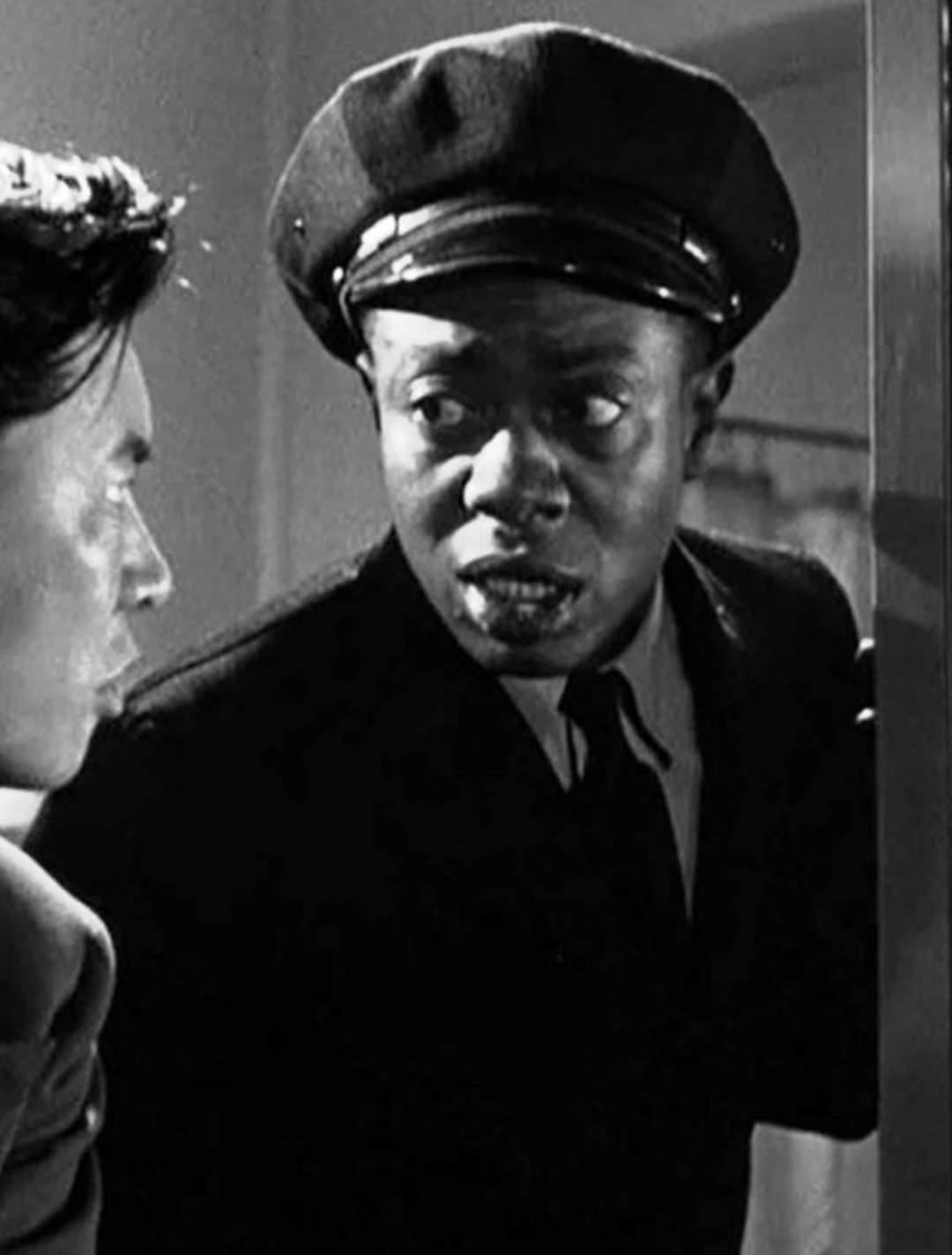
- Best in Dangerous Money (1946)
- Born: William Best; May 27, 1913; Sunflower, Mississippi, U.S.
- Died: February 27, 1962 (aged 48); Woodland Hills, Los Angeles, California, U.S.
- Resting place: Valhalla Memorial Park Cemetery
- Other name: Sleep 'n' Eat
- Occupation: Actor
- Years active: 1930–1955

William Best (May 27, 1913 – February 27, 1962), known professionally as Willie Best or Sleep 'n' Eat, was an American television and film actor.

Best was one of the first African American film actors and comedians to become well known. In the 21st century, his work, like that of Stepin Fetchit, is sometimes reviled because he was often called upon to play stereotypically lazy, illiterate, and/or simple-minded characters in films. Of the 124 films he appeared in, he received screen credit in at least 77, an unusual feat for an African American bit player.

== Stage ==
A native of Sunflower, Mississippi, Best reached Hollywood as a chauffeur for a vacationing couple. He decided to stay in the region and began his performing career with a traveling show in southern California. He was regularly hired as a character actor in Hollywood films after a talent scout discovered him on stage.

== Motion pictures ==
Best in a photo from Film Star Who's Who (1938)

Willie Best appeared in more than one hundred films of the 1930s and 1940s. Although several sources state that for years he was billed only as "Sleep n' Eat", Best received credit under this moniker instead of his real name in only six movies: his first film as a bit player (Harold Lloyd's Feet First) and in Up Pops the Devil (1931), The Monster Walks (1932), Kentucky Kernels and West of the Pecos (both 1934), and Murder on a Honeymoon (1935). He thereafter usually received credit as "Willie Best" or "William Best".

In his early films, Best clearly imitated Stepin Fetchit, delivering dialogue slowly in a thick and almost incoherent dialect, and reacting to things with a pop-eyed stare and slack-jawed amazement or bewilderment. Best later refined his screen character, abandoning the Fetchit mannerisms but retaining his natural comic reactions and dialect.

In reality he was far from the slow-witted clown he often portrayed; he was well aware of being typecast as "lazy darkey" characters: "I often think about these roles I have to play. Most of them are pretty broad. Sometimes I tell the director and he cuts out the bad parts... But what's an actor going to do? Either you do it or get out." Mitchell Leisen, who directed Willie Best in Suddenly It's Spring, described him as "the most natural actor I've ever seen." Comedian Bob Hope similarly acclaimed him as "the best actor I know", while the two were working together in 1940 on The Ghost Breakers.

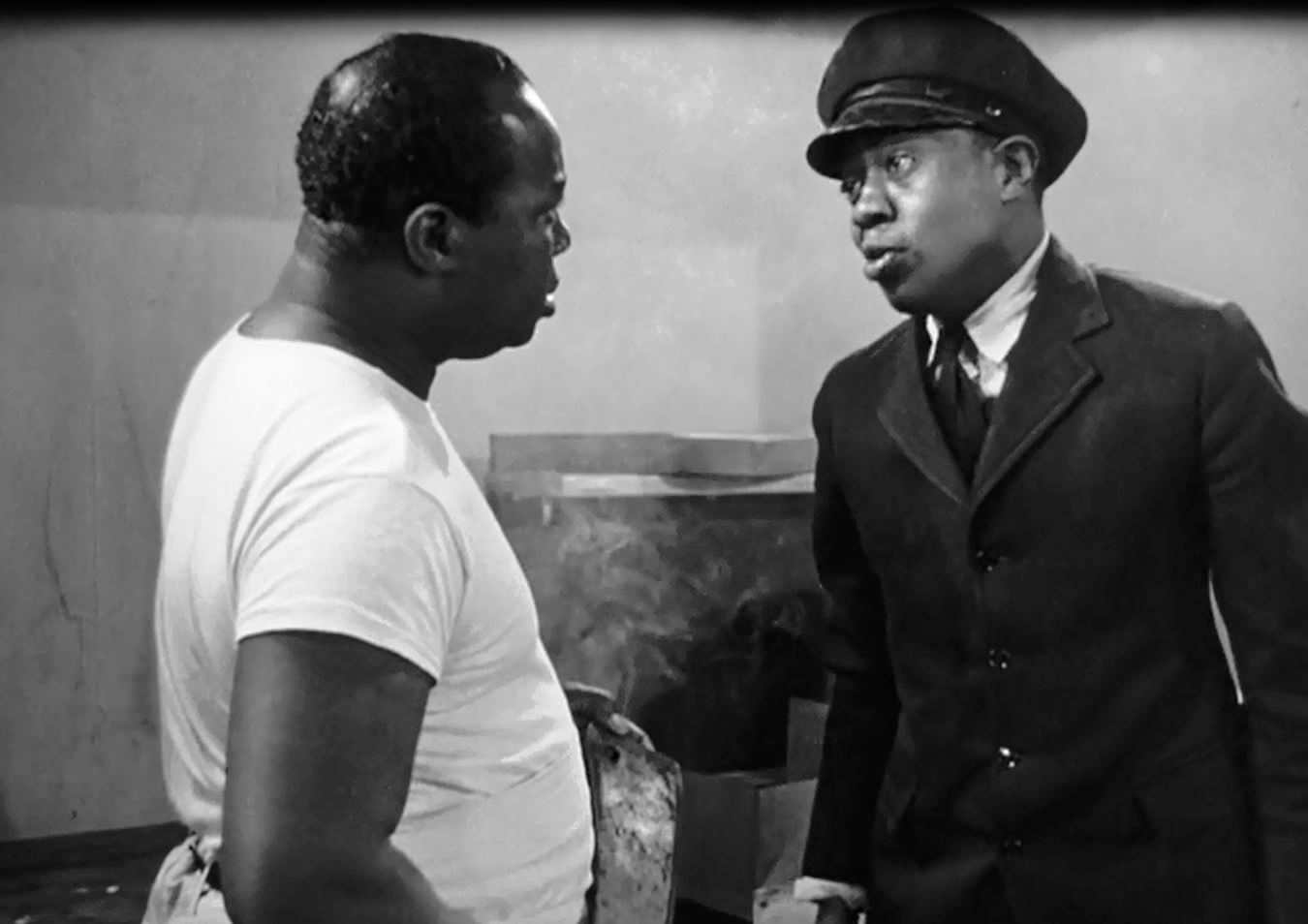
Dudley Dickerson (left) and Best in Dangerous Money (1946)

As a supporting actor, Best, like many black actors of his era, was regularly cast in domestic worker or service-oriented roles (though a few times he played the role echoing his previous occupation as a private chauffeur). He was often seen making a brief comic turn as a hotel, airline, or train porter, as well as an elevator operator, custodian, butler, valet, waiter, deliveryman, and once as a launch pilot in the 1939 movie Mr. Moto in Danger Island.

Willie Best received screen credit most of the time, which was unusual for "bit players"; most in the 1930s and 1940s were not accorded due credit. This also happened to white actors in small roles, but black actors were not credited even when their roles were larger. In more than 80 of his movies, he was given a proper character name (as opposed to simple descriptions such as "room service waiter" or "shoe-shine boy"), beginning with his second film.

He played the character of "Hipp" in three of RKO's six Scattergood Baines films with Guy Kibbee: Scattergood Baines (1941), Scattergood Survives a Murder (1942), and Cinderella Swings It in 1943. Actor Paul White, who played a young version of Best's "Hipp" in the first film, went on to play "Hipp" in the next three films; Best returned to the role in the last two.

Mantan Moreland, one of Willie Best's contemporaries, played "Birmingham Brown" the chauffeur in the Charlie Chan films. When Moreland took temporary leave of the series to tour in vaudeville, Willie Best took over Moreland's role (playing the character's cousin "Chattanooga Brown") in The Red Dragon in 1945 and Dangerous Money in 1946. Best and Moreland appeared together in the Chan mystery Shanghai Chest in 1948.

== Arrests ==
Best was fond of using recreational narcotics, which resulted in at least two well-publicized arrests. In 1942 he was arrested for possession of marijuana. In 1951, he was arrested for possession of heroin. The 1951 arraignment resulted in a $250 fine and three years' probation. The adverse publicity hurt Best's career. He made no further films after the 1951 Roy Rogers western South of Caliente.

== Television ==
Willie Best was rescued from professional oblivion by veteran producer Hal Roach, who regarded Best as one of the greatest talents he had ever met. Roach was unconcerned with Best's personal life as long as Best remained professional in acting roles. Best worked almost exclusively for Roach in 1950s television. He played Willie, the house servant/handyman and close friend of the title character of the Stu Erwin sitcom The Trouble with Father, for its entire run from 1950 to 1955.

He became familiar to early-TV audiences as Charlie, the elevator operator on CBS's My Little Margie, from 1953 to 1955. He played Billy Slocum in the syndicated drama Waterfront (1954). Perhaps his most surprising television work was in a Christmas-themed episode of Racket Squad, in which he played a straight character role without comedy or dialect.

== Death ==
Best died on February 27, 1962, at the Motion Picture Country Home in Woodland Hills, California, of cancer at age 48. He was buried by the Motion Picture Fund on March 5, 1962, at Valhalla Memorial Park Cemetery.

== Legacy ==
Best's "Sleep n' Eat" moniker surfaced again in the 2000 motion picture satire Bamboozled, directed by Spike Lee. In the film a "twenty-first-century minstrel show" is televised starring two African American performers, one of whom, portrayed by Tommy Davidson, plays a character named "Sleep n' Eat". In a nod to Mantan Moreland, his on-stage counterpart is named "Mantan".

== Filmography ==
Year	Title	Role	Notes
1930	Ladies of Leisure	George – the Elevator Operator	Uncredited
1930	Feet First	Charcoal – Janitor	Credited as Sleep 'n' Eat
1930	Deep South		
1931	The Virtuous Husband	Luftus	Alternative title: What Wives Don't Want
1931	Up Pops the Devil	Laundryman	Uncredited
1931	The Guilty Generation	Club Merlin Doorman	Uncredited
1932	The Monster Walks	Exodus	Credited as Sleep 'n' Eat
1932	Disorderly Conduct	Man at Police Station	Uncredited
1934	Little Miss Marker	Dizzy Memphis	Uncredited
1934	Kentucky Kernels	Buckshot	Credited as Sleep 'n' Eat
1934	West of the Pecos	Jonah	Credited as Sleep 'n' Eat
1935	Murder on a Honeymoon	Willie, the Porter	Credited as Sleep 'n' Eat
1935	The Nitwits	Sleepy	
1935	The Arizonian	Pompey	
1935	Jalna	Sam, the Janitor	Uncredited
1935	Hot Tip	Apollo	
1935	Annie Oakley	Second Cook	Uncredited
1935	To Beat the Band	Elevator Operator	Uncredited
1935	The Littlest Rebel	James Henry, a Cary slave	
1936	Muss 'Em Up	Janitor at Spivali's Bar	Uncredited
1936	The Lady Consents	Sam	Uncredited
1936	Silly Billies	Excitement	Uncredited
1936	Two in Revolt	Eph	
1936	Murder on a Bridle Path	High Pockets	
1936	The Bride Walks Out	Smokie – at marriage bureau	
1936	The Green Pastures	Henry – the Angel	Uncredited
1936	Down the Stretch	Noah	Credited as William Best
1936	Mummy's Boys	Catfish	
1936	Thank You, Jeeves!	Drowsy	
1936	Make Way for a Lady	William Townley – Jackson's Chauffeur	Uncredited
1936	General Spanky	Henry	
1936	Night Waitress	Cars For Rent attendant	Uncredited
1937	We Who Are About to Die	Airport Porter	Uncredited
1937	Racing Lady	Brass	
1937	Criminal Lawyer	Janitor	Uncredited
1937	Breezing Home	Speed	Credited as William Best
1937	You Can't Buy Luck	Airline Porter	Uncredited
1937	Meet the Missus	Mose – Shoe Shine Boy	
1937	Super-Sleuth	Warts	
1937	Mississippi Moods		
1937	The Lady Fights Back	McTavish	
1937	Saturday's Heroes	Sam	
1937	Deep South		Short film
1938	Crashing Hollywood	Train Porter	Uncredited
1938	Everybody's Doing It	Jasper – Elevator Operator	Uncredited
1938	Gold Is Where You Find It	Joshua	
1938	Merrily We Live	George W. Jones	
1938	Goodbye Broadway	Jughead	
1938	Vivacious Lady	Train Porter	
1938	I'm From the City	Train Porter	Uncredited
1938	Youth Takes a Fling	George	
1938	Straight Place and Show	Hannibal	Uncredited
1938	Spring Madness	Hotel Porter	Uncredited
1938	Blondie	Porter	
1939	The Saint Strikes Back	Algernon	Uncredited
1939	Mr. Moto in Danger Island	Launch Pilot	Uncredited
1939	Nancy Drew... Trouble Shooter	Apollo Johnson	
1939	Mr. Moto Takes a Vacation	Driver	Uncredited
1939	Way Down South	Chimney Sweep	Uncredited
1939	Blackmail	Bunny – the Janitor	Uncredited
1939	At the Circus	Redcap	Uncredited
1939	Blondie Brings Up Baby	Hotel Janitor	Uncredited
1939	The Covered Trailer	Baltimore	
1939	Private Detective	Norton's Valet	
1939	Miracle on Main Street	Duke	
1939	Slightly Honorable	Art, the Elevator Operator	
1940	I Take This Woman	Sambo	
1940	Blondie on a Budget	Newspaper Boy	Uncredited
1940	The Ghost Breakers	Alex	
1940	Money and the Woman	George Washington Jones, Dave's Servant	
1940	Who Killed Aunt Maggie?	Andrew	
1941	High Sierra	Algernon	
1941	Flight from Destiny	George	
1941	The Body Disappears	Willie	Credited as Willie Best
1941	Scattergood Baines	Hipp	
1941	The Lady from Cheyenne	George	
1941	Kisses for Breakfast	Arnold	
1941	Highway West	Bub Wellington	
1941	The Smiling Ghost	Clarence	Credited as Willie Best
1941	Nothing But the Truth	Samuel	
1941	The Body Disappears	Willie	
1942	Whispering Ghosts	Euclid White Brown	
1942	Juke Girl	Jo-Mo	
1942	Maisie Gets Her Man	Sam, Room Service Waiter	Uncredited
1942	A-Haunting We Will Go	Waiter	
1942	Busses Roar	Sunshine	
1942	Scattergood Survives a Murder	Hipp	
1942	The Hidden Hand	Eustis the Chauffeur	
1943	The Powers Girl	Men's Room Attendant	Uncredited
1943	Cinderella Swings It	Hipp	
1943	Cabin in the Sky	Second Idea Man	
1943	Dixie	Steward	Uncredited
1943	The Kansan	Bones	
1943	Thank Your Lucky Stars	Soldier	Uncredited
1944	The Adventures of Mark Twain	George, Twain's Butler	Uncredited
1944	Home in Indiana	Mo' Rum	Uncredited
1944	The Girl Who Dared	Woodrow	
1944	The Mark of the Whistler	Men's Room Attendant	Uncredited
1944	Music for Millions	Red Cap	Uncredited
1945	The Monster and the Ape	Flash	Serial
1945	Pillow to Post	Lucille	
1945	Hold That Blonde!	Willie Shelley	
1945	She Wouldn't Say Yes	Porter	Uncredited
1945	The Red Dragon	Chattanooga Brown	
1946	The Bride Wore Boots	Joe	
1946	The Face of Marble	Shadrach	
1946	Dangerous Money	Chattanooga Brown	Alternative title: Charlie Chan in Dangerous Money
1947	Suddenly, It's Spring	Porter on train	
1947	The Red Stallion	Jackson	
1948	Half Past Midnight	Andy Jones	
1948	Smart Woman	Train Porter	Uncredited
1948	Shanghai Chest	Willie Best, in jail cell	Uncredited
1949	Jiggs and Maggie in Jackpot Jitters	Willie	Uncredited
1950	High and Dizzy	Wesley	Short
1951	South of Caliente	Willie	

== Television ==
Year	Title	Role	Notes
1950–1955	The Stu Erwin Show	Willie, The Handyman	30 episodes
1951–1952	Racket Squad	Janitor / Cleaning Man	2 episodes
1952–1955	My Little Margie	Charlie	21 episodes
1953	Mystery Theater / Mark Saber of the Homicide Squad "The Case of the Invisible Death"	Manservant / Corpus	
1954–1955	Waterfront	Billy Slocum / Willie Slocum	18 episodes (final appearance)

== See also ==
- Stepin Fetchit
- Mantan Moreland
- Fred Toones
- Blue Washington
- Blackface
