= Ben Carter (actor) =

American actor (1907–1946)

- Born: February 10, 1910; Fairfield, Iowa, U.S.
- Died: December 12, 1946 (aged 36); New York City, U.S.
- Occupations: Actor, casting agent
- Years active: 1934–1946

Ben Carter (February 10, 1910/1907 – December 12, 1946) was an American actor and casting agent. He appeared in numerous Hollywood feature films including The Harvey Girls, Tin Pan Alley, Crash Dive, Born to Sing, and Dixie Jamboree.

== Early life ==
Carter was born in Fairfield, Iowa. His father was a barber and his mother was a housemaid. He graduated from high school in Aurora, Illinois.

== Career ==
Carter headed to Los Angeles to work in movies. As a booking agent he focused on African American performers in New York City and Los Angeles. He was one of the first African American performers to land a seven-year contract at 20th Century-Fox. He opened his agency office in 1935.

Carter appeared in Gone With the Wind (1939) as well as casting all the other African American actors and actresses in it, Maryland (1940) and Tin Pan Alley (1940). Carter often performed in comic roles and in scenes which allowed him to display his singing ability such as in The Harvey Girls (1946) and A Day at the Races (1937). A notable role of his was in the World War II movie Crash Dive (1943) where his character rises above racial stereotypes and is portrayed as a valuable member of a submarine's crew.

== Comedy team ==
Ben Carter teamed with the African American comedian Mantan Moreland, and perfected an "incomplete sentence" act, where they conducted entire conversations while speaking only in fragments:

MORELAND: I saw old --

CARTER: Is he still out there?

MORELAND: Yeah.

CARTER: I thought he was --

MORELAND: He was, but he got out.

CARTER: You know what I heard?

MORELAND: Not until Christmas!

CARTER: No?

MORELAND: I never did believe --

CARTER: I don't believe anything he says, either.

They performed this routine in two Charlie Chan pictures, The Scarlet Clue and Dark Alibi, and in the musical comedy Bowery to Broadway. Carter and Moreland were so popular that they embarked on a personal-appearance tour in 1946.

== Personal life ==
Carter was a member of the Hollywood Victory Committee and was a civil rights activist.

He resided at 2133 S. Harvard Blvd. in West Adams, Los Angeles, California, in 1942.

Carter suffered from diphtheria. He died of the disease on December 12, 1946, in New York City.

== Filmography ==
Year	Title	Role	Notes
1934	Hollywood Party	Elevator Operator	Uncredited
1935	Transient Lady	Barbershop Patron	Uncredited
1935	Kentucky Blue Streak	Waiter / Colored Octette Leader	
1936	The Green Pastures	Gambler	Uncredited
1936	Missing Girls	Pokey	
1937	A Day at the Races	Black Singer	Uncredited
1937	Adventure's End	Stantul, Black Sailor	
1938	Having Wonderful Time	Minor Role	(scenes deleted)
1939	Gone With the Wind		Uncredited
1940	Little Old New York	Noah	
1940	Safari	Happy	
1940	New Moon	Singer - Member of Jericho Choir	Uncredited
1940	Maryland	Shadrach	
1940	Carolina Moon	Wheeler's Butler	Uncredited
1940	South to Karanga	Higgins	
1940	Earl of Puddlestone	Homer	
1940	Tin Pan Alley	Boy	
1940	Chad Hanna	Bell Boy	
1941	Sleepers West	Leander Jones - Porter	
1941	Ride on Vaquero	Watchman Bullfinch	
1941	Dressed to Kill	Sam	
1942	Young America	Abraham	
1942	Born to Sing	'Eight-Ball'	
1942	Reap the Wild Wind	Chinkapin	
1942	Her Cardboard Lover	Elevator Operator	Uncredited
1942	Daring Young Man	Pinky	
1943	Happy Go Lucky	Joe Brown	Uncredited
1943	Crash Dive	Oliver Cromwell Jones	
1943	Redhead from Manhattan	Mark Anthony Brown	Uncredited
1943	Mister Big	Ben Carter - Choir Leader	
1944	This Is the Life	Himself	
1944	Stars on Parade	Ben Carter Choir Leader	
1944	Dixie Jamboree	Sam the Deckhand	
1944	Bowery to Broadway	No-More	
1945	The Scarlet Clue	Ben Carter	
1945	The Great John L.	Thaddeus	Uncredited
1945	Lady on a Train	Maxwell	
1945	She Went to the Races	Groom	Uncredited
1946	The Harvey Girls	John Henry	
1946	Riverboat Rhythm	Benjamin	
1946	Dark Alibi	Benjamin Brown	
