= Bootle Beetle =

1947 Donald Duck cartoon

- Theatrical release poster
- Directed by: Jack Hannah
- Story by: Bill Berg; Milt Banta
- Produced by: Walt Disney
- Starring: Clarence Nash; Dink Trout
- Music by: Oliver Wallace
- Animation by: Bill Justice; Andy Engman; Art Babbitt; Judge Whitaker
- Layouts by: Yale Gracey
- Backgrounds by: Thelma Witmer
- Production company: Walt Disney Productions
- Distributed by: RKO Radio Pictures, Inc.
- Release date: August 22, 1947
- Running time: 7 minutes
- Country: United States
- Language: English

Bootle Beetle is a 1947 animated short film featuring Donald Duck. It was released by Walt Disney Productions.

== Plot ==
A rare breed insect, the Bootle beetle, tells the story of how, as a child, he left the forest and came across a monster, Donald Duck, who recognized the rare insect and tried to capture him in a jar.

== Voice cast ==
- Clarence Nash as Donald Duck
- Dink Trout as Bootle Beetle

== Home media ==
The short was released on December 11, 2007 on Walt Disney Treasures: The Chronological Donald, Volume Three: 1947-1950.
