= Clarence Budington Kelland =

American novelist

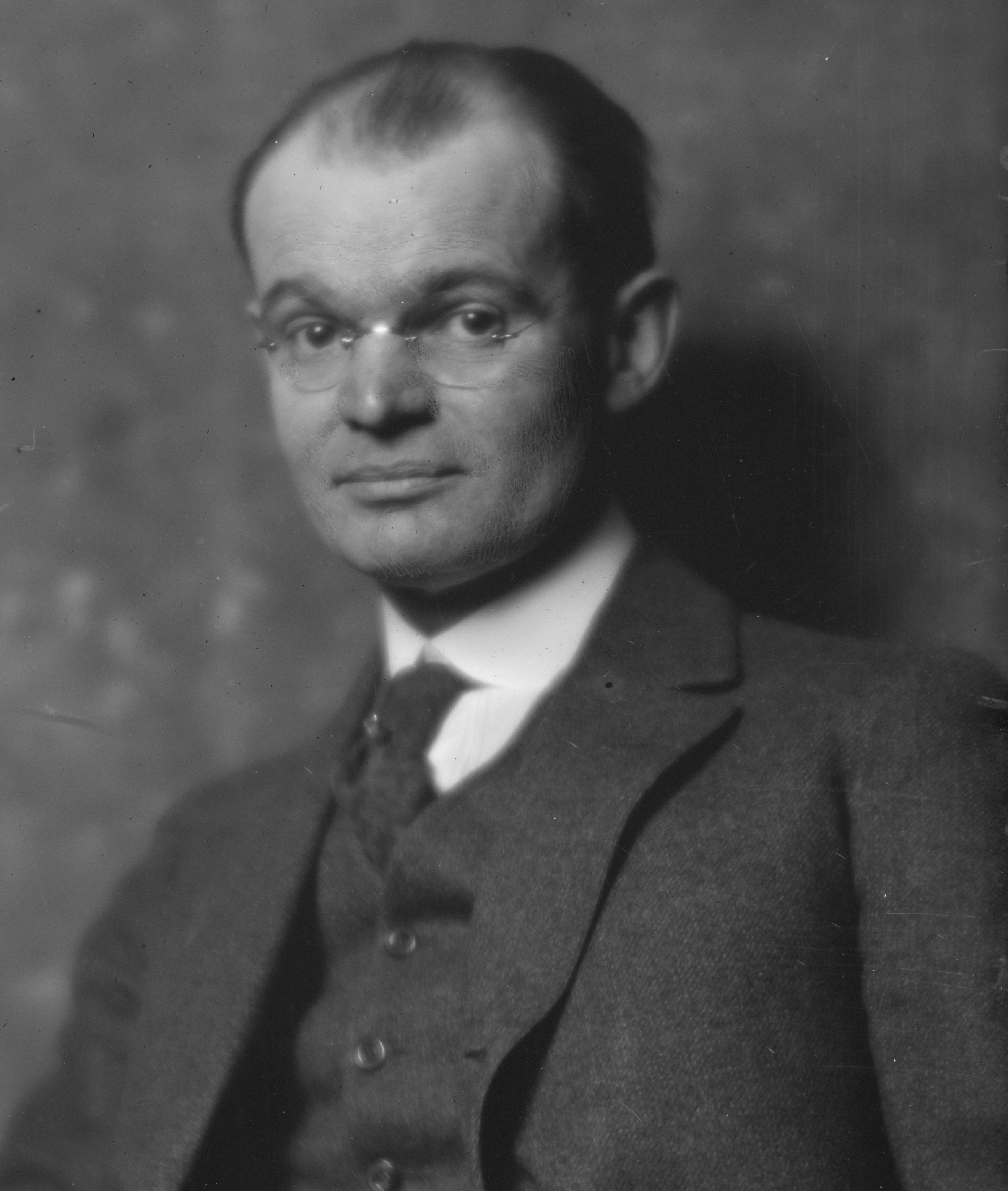
- Kelland in 1917
- Born: July 11, 1881; Portland, Michigan, U.S.
- Died: February 18, 1964 (aged 82); Scottsdale, Arizona, U.S.
- Occupation: Writer
- Years active: 1907-1964
- Political party: Republican Party
- Spouse: Betty Caroline Smith (m. 1907)
- Children: 2

Clarence Budington "Bud" Kelland (July 11, 1881 – February 18, 1964) was an American writer. Prolific and versatile, he was a prominent literary figure in his heyday, and he described himself as "the best second-rate writer in America".

Kelland had a long career as a writer of fiction, stretching from 1913 to 1960. He was published in many magazines, including The Saturday Evening Post and The American Magazine. A prolific writer, his output included 60 novels and some 200 short stories. His best known juvenile works were the Mark Tidd series and the Catty Atkins series, while his best known adult work was the Scattergood Baines series. Other notable adult books by Kelland include Conflict (1920), Rhoda Fair (1925), Hard Money (1930), Arizona (1939), and Dangerous Angel (1953). Kelland was the "literary idol" of teenager and future writer John O'Hara.

Today, Kelland is relatively little known. In a 1995 installment of Harlan Ellison's television commentary, Ellison reflected on Kelland's descent from fame to obscurity, lamenting it as an example of diminished cultural literacy and a decline in interest in the printed word.

Still, Kelland's name lives on in the dozens of motion pictures adapted from his works, including Speak Easily (1932) starring Buster Keaton. Opera Hat, a Kelland serial from The American Magazine, was the basis for the film Mr. Deeds Goes to Town (1936) starring Gary Cooper. Opera Hat later was turned into the short-lived television series Mr. Deeds Goes to Town (1969–70), and the movie Mr. Deeds (2002). One of Kelland's best-known characters was featured in the Scattergood Baines series of six Hollywood films from 1941 to 1943, starring Guy Kibbee as Baines. The Baines character was a benevolent but often misunderstood figure trying to help the people in his small town. The series began with Scattergood Baines (1941) and ended with Cinderella Swings It (1943).

== Biography ==
Kelland was born in Portland, Michigan, and attended public schools in Detroit. After completing two years of high school, he took a job in a chair factory, studying law at night. He earned a law degree from Detroit College of Law in 1902, but practiced law for less than a year. From 1903 to 1907, he worked at The Detroit News as a reporter, political editor, and Sunday editor.

Kelland married Betty Caroline Smith in 1907, and at the urging of his father-in-law, left the newspaper business and moved to Vermont for a short period to run a clothespin mill with his brother. By 1907, he had returned to Detroit to work for The American Boy magazine, beginning as a proofreader, and moving up to become editor. Circulation grew from 90,000 at the beginning of his tenure, to 360,000 in 1915 when he left the magazine. From 1913 to 1915, he also lectured on juvenile literature and writing at the University of Michigan. Kelland had two sons with Betty, Thomas Smith Kelland and Horace Kendall Kelland. Tom Kelland also wrote for a living, working as a newspaper reporter in New York.

Kelland made the news during the Great Depression when he refused to pay a $3,313 bill from dressmaker Hattie Carnegie, Inc., for purchases by his wife from February 27, 1931, to February 27, 1932, stating he was not liable for payment because the purchases were not "necessaries". His wife supported him, stating that she, not he, should have received the bill. Kelland lost the action, and had to pay the full amount. In that same year, Kelland was director of the Bank of North Hempstead in Port Washington, New York. The bank failed, tying up most of his securities.

Kelland bought a house in Phoenix, Arizona, in 1937, and became active in national politics at about the same time. He was politically active as a Republican, serving as the Republican National Committeeman from Arizona from 1940 to 1956. Before 1941, he was a non-interventionist, opposing U.S. involvement in what became the Second World War. His passionate dislike for the New Deal seemed to have spurred his entry into national politics. Time magazine referred to him as "pugnacious", "vitriolic", "peppery", and "gaunt-faced"—a description at odds with the whimsical character of Kelland's fictional characters. He was as harsh on his fellow Republicans as he was on Democrats, blaming Eisenhower for "wrecking" the party. He was particularly critical of Eisenhower's appointment of Earl Warren to the Supreme Court.

From the mid-1920s, Kelland served as the toastmaster at the weekly luncheons of New York's Dutch Treat Club. In 1940, when he was president of the club, Kelland said "the fifth column in this country is headed by that fellow in the White House", i.e., President Franklin D. Roosevelt. Author Hendrik Willem Van Loon resigned from the club to protest this "disparaging" remark.

Later in life, Kelland became vice president and director of Phoenix Newspaper Group, which published The Arizona Republic and the Phoenix Gazette. He died in Scottsdale, Arizona, on February 18, 1964.

== Kelland's Connection to Old Tucson Studios ==
According to historian David Leighton, best-selling author Clarence Budington Kelland first came to Arizona in 1936, while doing research on trailer life for a magazine serial entitled “Fugitive Father,” later published in the Saturday Evening Post. He planned to stay one night in Phoenix, Arizona but two weeks passed before he departed for home in New York City, in the meantime he fell in love with the Valley of the Sun.

In 1937, he returned and bought a home surrounded by a grove of orange trees, grapefruit trees and date palms in the state capital (Phoenix) and began wintering here. By the following year, he was researching Arizona history for a three-novel series in which the first one took place during the U.S. Civil War which mostly occurred in Tucson.

By December 1938, the galley proofs were finalized of what would be a magazine serial and then the novel Arizona — about a female pioneer, Phoebe Titus, in Tucson during the U.S. Civil War.

At that time, Harry Cohn, president of Columbia Pictures, read the proofs and purchased the movie rights. Soon after he hired Wesley Ruggles to direct the film and chose actress Jean Arthur to be the lead for the movie which would use the same name as the book for the film, Arizona.

It's believed that this Western was originally going to be shot at the Columbia Pictures-owned ranch in Burbank, California until a Tucson hotel manager and film promoter named Nick C. Hall pushed on Columbia executives and possibly Kelland himself to have the film about Tucson actually filmed in Tucson.

The result of this was, in 1939, Columbia Pictures staff built a replica of what Tucson looked like in the 1860s for the filming of the movie Arizona starring Jean Arthur and William Holden based on the Kelland novel Arizona.

The old movie set is what is now called Old Tucson Studios, located about 15 west of Tucson, Arizona. Films are still shot at this movie set and amusement park.

== Bibliography ==
=== Mark Tidd juvenile series ===
- Mark Tidd: His Adventures and Strategies (Harpers 1913)
- Mark Tidd in the Backwoods (1914)
- Mark Tidd in Business (1915)
- Mark Tidd's Citadel (1916)
- Mark Tidd, Editor (1917)
- Mark Tidd, Manufacturer (1918)
- Mark Tidd in Italy (1925)
- Mark Tidd in Egypt (1926)
- Mark Tidd in Sicily (1928)
- Mark Tidd in Palestine (serialized in American Boy 1926–1927)
- Mark Tidd in Paris (serialized in American Boy 1929–1930)
- Mark Tidd Back Home (serialized in American Boy 1931)

=== Catty Atkins juvenile series ===
- Catty Atkins (1920)
- Catty Atkins, Riverman (1921)
- Catty Atkins, Sailorman (1922)
- Catty Atkins, Financier (1923)
- Catty Atkins, Bandmaster (1924)

=== Scattergood Baines series ===
- Scattergood Baines (1921)
- Scattergood Returns (1940)
- Scattergood Baines Pulls the Strings (1941)

=== Other books ===
- Quizzer No. 20, Being Questions and Answers on Insurance (1911)
- Thirty Pieces of Silver (1913)
- The American Boy's Workshop: Each Subject by an Expert (ed.) (1914)
- Into His Own: The Story of an Airedale (1915)
- The Hidden Spring (1916)
- Sudden Jim (1917)
- The Source (1918)
- The Little Moment of Happiness (1919)
- Highflyers (1919)
- Efficiency Edgar (1920)
- Youth Challenges (1920)
- Conflict (1922)
- Contraband (1923)
- The Steadfast Heart (1924)
- Miracle (1925)
- Rhoda Fair (1926)
- Dance Magic (1927)
- Knuckles (1928)
- Dynasty (1929)
- Hard Money (1930)
- Gold (1931)
- Speak Easily (1931)
- The Great Crooner (1933)
- Tombstone (1933)
- The Cat's Paw (1934)
- The Jealous House (1934)
- Dreamland (1935)
- Roxana (1936)
- Spotlight (1937)
- Star Rising (1938)
- Arizona (1939)
- Skin Deep (1939)
- Valley of the Sun (1940)
- Silver Spoon (1941)
- Sugarfoot (1942)
- Archibald the Great (1943)
- Heart on Her Sleeve (1943)
- Alias Jane Smith (1944)
- Land of the Torreones (1946)
- Double Treasure (1946)
- Merchant of Valor (1947)
- Murder for a Million (1947)
- This Is My Son (1948)
- Desert Law (1949)
- The Comic Jest (play) (1949)
- Stolen Goods (1950)
- The Great Mail Robbery (1951)
- The Key Man (1952)
- Dangerous Angel (1953)
- Murder Makes an Entrance (1955)
- The Sinister Strangers (1955)
- The Case of the Nameless Corpse (1956)
- Death Keeps a Secret (1956)
- West of the Law (1958)
- The Lady and the Giant (1959)
- Where There's Smoke (1959)
- Counterfeit Gentleman (1960)
- The Monitor Affair (1960)
- Mark of Treachery (1961)
- The Artless Heiress (1962)
- Party Man (1962)

== See also ==
- The American Boy, a magazine at which he was an assistant editor
- Mr. Deeds Goes to Town, a movie based on his book Opera Hat
