= The Greener Yard =

1949 Donald Duck cartoon

- Theatrical release poster
- Directed by: Jack Hannah
- Story by: Bill Berg; Milt Banta
- Produced by: Walt Disney
- Starring: Clarence Nash; Dink Trout; Florence Gill
- Music by: Oliver Wallace
- Animation by: Bob Carlson; Volus Jones; Dan MacManus; Judge Whitaker; Bill Justice
- Layouts by: Yale Gracey
- Backgrounds by: Ralph Hulett
- Production company: Walt Disney Productions
- Distributed by: RKO Radio Pictures, Inc.
- Release date: October 14, 1949
- Running time: 7 minutes
- Country: United States
- Language: English

The Greener Yard is a 1949 animated short film featuring Donald Duck. It was released by Walt Disney Productions.

== Plot ==
Bootle Beetle lives next door to Donald Duck. He explains to a younger beetle the dangers of Donald's garden by telling the stories of his battles with Donald.

== Voice cast ==
- Clarence Nash as Donald Duck
- Dink Trout as Bootle Beetle
- Florence Gill as the hens

== Home media ==
The short was released on December 11, 2007 on Walt Disney Treasures: The Chronological Donald, Volume Three: 1947-1950.
