= Sea Salts =

1949 Donald Duck cartoon

- Theatrical release poster
- Directed by: Jack Hannah
- Story by: Bill Berg; Nick George
- Produced by: Walt Disney
- Starring: Clarence Nash; Dink Trout
- Music by: Oliver Wallace
- Animation by: Jack Boyd; Bob Carlson; Bill Justice; John Sibley
- Layouts by: Yale Gracey
- Backgrounds by: Thelma Witmer
- Color process: Technicolor
- Production company: Walt Disney Productions
- Distributed by: RKO Radio Pictures, Inc.
- Release date: April 8, 1949
- Running time: 7:30
- Country: United States
- Language: English

Sea Salts is a 1949 animated short film featuring Donald Duck. It was released by Walt Disney Productions.

== Plot ==
'Mac' Bootle Beetle tells the story of the time he and Donald Duck were sole survivors of a shipwreck. The story involves how Donald cheats Mac out of food, both on the raft and the deserted island they land on. Eventually they were rescued and became life-long friends.

== Voice cast ==
- Clarence Nash as Donald Duck
- Dink Trout as "Mac" Bootle Beetle

== Home media ==
The short was released on December 11, 2007, on Walt Disney Treasures: The Chronological Donald, Volume Three: 1947-1950.
