= Navy Wife (1956 film) =

1956 film by Edward Bernds

- Theatrical poster
- Directed by: Edward Bernds
- Written by: Kay Lenard
- Based on: Mother Sir by Tats Blain
- Produced by: Walter Wanger
- Starring: Joan Bennett; Gary Merrill; Shirley Yamaguchi
- Cinematography: Wilfred M. Cline
- Edited by: Richard Cahoon
- Music by: Hans J. Salter
- Production company: Walter Wanger Productions
- Distributed by: Allied Artists
- Release date: May 20, 1956
- Running time: 83 minutes
- Country: United States
- Language: English
- Budget: $353,300

Navy Wife is a 1956 American comedy film directed by Edward Bernds (who also directed "Three Stooges" and "Bowery Boys"), and starring Joan Bennett, Gary Merrill, Shirley Yamaguchi. The screenplay was written by Kay Lenard, based on the novel Mother-Sir! by Tats Blain. The film was produced by Walter Wanger, who was Bennett's husband in real life.

== Plot ==
This movie takes place in post-war Japan, where Peg Blain (Bennett) and daughter Debby (Judy Nugent) join Peg's commanding-officer husband Jack (Merrill). After the local Japanese wives see how independent and self-reliant Peg and Debby are, they demand to have the same respect, rights, and privileges as them. At a military Christmas party, the situation gets brought up and resolved.

== Cast ==
- Joan Bennett as Peg Blain
- Gary Merrill as Jack Blain
- Judy Nugent as Debby Blain
- Maurice Manson as Capt. Arwin
- Teru Shimada as Mayor Yoshida
- Tom Komuro as Ohara
- Shizue Nakamura as Mitsuko
- Robert Nichols as Oscar
- Carol Veazie as Amelia
- John Craven as Dr. Carter
- Shirley Yamaguchi as Akashi

== See also ==
- List of American films of 1956
