= Boston Blackie's Chinese Venture =

1949 film directed by Seymour Friedman

- Film poster
- Directed by: Seymour Friedman
- Written by: Maurice Tombragel
- Produced by: Rudolph Flothow
- Starring: Chester Morris; Maylia Fong; Richard Lane
- Cinematography: Vincent J. Farrar
- Edited by: Richard Fantl
- Music by: Mischa Bakaleinikoff
- Distributed by: Columbia Pictures Corporation
- Release date: March 2, 1949
- Running time: 59 minutes
- Country: United States
- Language: English

Boston Blackie's Chinese Venture is a 1949 mystery film directed by Seymour Friedman, starring Chester Morris. This was the last of Columbia's 14 Boston Blackie pictures (1941–49).

== Plot ==
Boston Blackie and his sidekick Shorty are seen exiting a Chinese laundry where the proprietor is soon found murdered. The suspects include a bored tour guide, a B-girl in a tavern, the inhabitants of an old Chinatown tenement, and Blackie and Shorty themselves. Investigating the murder one jump ahead of the police, Blackie and Shorty uncover an illegal gambling ring.

== Cast ==
- Chester Morris as Boston Blackie
- Maylia Fong as Mei Ling
- Richard Lane as Inspector William R. Farraday
- Sid Tomack as Shorty
- Frank Sully as Detective Sergeant Matthews
- Don McGuire as Les, the tour guide
- Joan Woodbury as Red, the bar girl
- Charles Arnt as Pop Gerard
- Luis Van Rooten as Bill Craddock (as Louis Van Rooten)
- Philip Ahn as Wong Chung Shee

== Production ==
The film went into production under the title Boston Blackie's Honor; the title was changed in July 1948. Richard Lane, as long-suffering Inspector Farraday, was the only other character who appeared in all of the Boston Blackie films. George E. Stone, playing Blackie's sidekick The Runt, missed the first and the last films in the series due to illness. In Chinese Venture Stone was replaced by Sid Tomack as "Shorty."

Columbia Pictures had been gradually curtailing its "B" film series; most of them ended in 1948 and 1949. The previous film in the Boston Blackie series was Trapped by Boston Blackie (1948), which had been given to promising first-time director Seymour Friedman. Friedman had been an assistant director who had filmed several scenes for Columbia's major musical Down to Earth. He was promoted to full-fledged director in December 1947. Friedman did such a good job with the Boston Blackie picture that the series was extended for one more outing. Friedman returned as director of Boston Blackie's Chinese Venture, which began filming in June 1948.

It was the least expensive entry in the Boston Blackie series, filmed in only 10 days with a running time of 59 minutes (a new low for the series).

== Reception ==
The finished film was released on March 3, 1949. The trade critics gave it passing marks. Publisher Pete Harrison called it "Nothing sensational, but it is a good Boston Blackie melodrama; it holds the spectator's interest pretty tense [sic] all the way through... The acting, as a result of the fairly skillful direction, is good."
