= Cinderella Swings It =

1943 American comedy-drama film directed by Christy Cabanne

- Theatrical poster for the film
- Directed by: Christy Cabanne; John E. Burch (assistant)
- Screenplay by: Michael L. Simmons
- Based on: the series of stories about "Scattergood Baines" by Clarence Budington Kelland
- Produced by: Jerrold T. Brandt
- Starring: Guy Kibbee; Gloria Warren; Helen Parrish; Dick Hogan; Leonid Kinskey; Billy Lenhart; Kenneth Brown; Dink Trout
- Cinematography: Arthur Martinelli
- Edited by: Richard Cahoon
- Music by: Paul Sawtell
- Production company: Pyramid Pictures
- Distributed by: RKO Radio Pictures
- Release date: January 22, 1943 (US)
- Running time: 69 minutes
- Country: United States
- Language: English

Cinderella Swings It is a 1943 American comedy-drama film directed by Christy Cabanne from a screenplay by Michael L. Simmons, based on short stories by Clarence Budington Kelland about small-town philanthropist Scattergood Baines. Produced and Distributed by RKO Radio Pictures, it was released on January 22, 1943, and stars Guy Kibbee and Gloria Warren. It was the last of the six films in the Scattergood Baines series and the only one without the word “Scattergood” in the title. Originally called Scattergood Swings It, the picture was renamed because the franchise was declining in popularity.

== Plot ==
Scattergood Baines is a local merchant in the New England town of Coldriver. To support the war effort, he donates a tract of land to the army and organizes the local civilian defense team. In addition, when a local bandleader, Tommy Stewart, is upset over not being able to enlist until he graduates, Scattergood suggests that Stewart and his female friend, Sally Benson, organize a local show to support the USO.

Meanwhile, the local music teacher, Professor Vladimir Smitken, believes his niece, Betty Palmer, has a good enough classical voice to attempt to make it in New York City. Using all of his meager savings, he takes Betty to New York, where he has arranged for her to audition for a Broadway producer, Brock Harris. Harris is less than impressed with Betty's voice, and she and Smitken return to Coldriver, Smitken in a very bad financial state. To cheer Betty up, Scattergood, along with some support from Stewart, convinces her to appear in the show Stewart and Sally are putting together. Scattergood also convinces Betty that she should switch from singing classical music to more modern swing tunes. As Betty practices for the show, a romance blossoms between her and Stewart, which makes Sally jealous, as she looked on Stewart as her personal property. To hinder Betty's budding relationship, Sally constructs several roadblocks in an attempt to prevent her from being in the show.

When Scattergood discovers Smitken's financial difficulties, he decides try to do something to help the professor out. He learns that the Broadway producer Harris is an avid fisherman. He travels to New York and convinces Harris to return to Coldriver with him, selling him on the area's excellent fishing. Once he has Harris in the area, he contrives excuse after excuse in order to keep him there, delaying him long enough so that he is still in town when Stewart's show is going on. Since he has several hours to kill before he has to board a train back to the city, Scattergood convinces Harris to attend the USO benefit show. Despite Sally's attempts to derail her, Betty appears in the show, and this time wows Harris with her performance of swing tunes. Harris immediately signs her for his next Broadway production after the show.

== Cast ==
- Guy Kibbee as Scattergood Baines
- Gloria Warren as Betty Palmer
- Dick Hogan as Tommy Stewart
- Leonid Kinskey as Professor Vladimir Smitken
- Helen Parrish as Sally Benson
- Billy Lenhart as Butch
- Kenneth Brown as Buddy
- Dink Trout as Pliny Picket
- Pierre Watkin as Brock Harris
- Lee "Lasses" White as Ed Potts
- Fern Emmett as Clara Potts
- Ed Waller as Lem
- Kay Linaker as Mme. Dolores
- Grace Costello as Tap dancer
- Christine McIntyre as Secretary

(cast list as per AFI database)

== Production ==
The sixth and final installment in the Scattergood Baines film series, it was the only one of the series which was a musical. In July 1942 it was announced that Guy Kibbee would star in the picture, at that time named Scattergood Swings It, to be produced by Jerrold T. Brandt, who had produced the other five Scattergood films. Right after Kibbee was announced, Gloria Warren was given the female lead in the picture. In August, Christy Cabanne was assigned as the film's director. The score included the songs "The Flag's Still There, Mr. Key, " words and music by George Jessel and Ben Oakland, and "I Heard You Cry Last Night," words and music by Jerrie Kruger and Ted Grouya.

Trade screenings of the film occurred on January 18 and 19, 1943. The film premiered on January 22, after which it was announced that it would be released nationwide in the United States on February 22. Shortly after its release, Cinderella Swings It was given a class A-1 rating by the National Legion of Decency, making it unobjectionable for general audiences.

== Reception ==
The Film Daily panned the film, calling it "unimaginative", and "loaded with hoakum". They did not like the script by Michael L. Simmons, and found Cabanne's direction dull. The one bright spot for them was the performance of Gloria Warren, and they felt that Kibbee handled his role capably. Harrison's Reports gave Cinderella Swings It a poor rating, although they did say that the film was the best of the Scattergood series, and they enjoyed Warren's performance.
