= Food and Magic =

- Produced by: US War Department
- Starring: Jack Carson
- Distributed by: Warner Bros.
- Release date: November 18, 1943
- Running time: 10 minutes
- Country: United States
- Language: English

Food and Magic is a 1943 short documentary film commissioned by the United States Government during World War II. Food and Magic, was produced by the War Activities Committee of The Motion Picture Industry and it deals with food conservation and healthy eating. It stars Jack Carson as a sideshow barker who informs the crowd about proper wartime food consumption, including conservation and rationing.

== Archive ==
Food and Magic was preserved in 2008 by the Academy Film Archive. The film is part of the Academy War Film Collection, one of the largest collections of World War II era short films held outside government archives.
