= Chinatown at Midnight =

1949 film by Seymour Friedman

- Directed by: Seymour Friedman
- Written by: Robert Libott; Frank Burt
- Produced by: Sam Katzman
- Starring: Hurd Hatfield; Jean Willes; Tom Powers
- Cinematography: Henry Freulich
- Edited by: Edwin H. Bryant
- Production company: Columbia Pictures
- Distributed by: Columbia Pictures
- Release date: November 17, 1949 (New York City)
- Running time: 67 minutes
- Country: United States
- Language: English

Chinatown at Midnight is a 1949 American film noir crime film directed by Seymour Friedman and starring Hurd Hatfield, Jean Willes and Tom Powers.

== Plot ==
After a jade vase is mentioned to him by Lisa Marcel, an interior designer, Clifford Ward steals it from a Chinatown shop. He shoots and kills shopkeeper Joe Wong, who triggered the burglar alarm, and when employee Betty Chang telephones for help, Ward shoots her as well.

Ward, fluent in Chinese, speaks to the police on the phone. Telephone operator Hazel Fong becomes the only hope police have of identifying the voice. Lisa sees a photo of the stolen vase in the newspaper and immediately suspects Ward, who then adds her to his murder victims. When he falls ill and phones a neighborhood pharmacy, the call is once again placed by Hazel, who recognizes his voice. Ward attempts to flee, but the police gun him down.

== Cast ==
- Hurd Hatfield as Clifford Ward
- Jean Willes as Alice
- Tom Powers as Capt. Howard Brown
- Ray Walker as Sam Costa
- Charles Russell as Fred Morgan
- Jacqueline deWit as Lisa Marcel (as Jacqueline DeWit)
- Maylia as Hazel Fong
- Ross Elliott as Eddie Marsh

== Preservation status ==
In 2014, a pristine 35mm print of the film was struck from the Columbia Pictures archives and subsequently exhibited at the Museum of Modern Art in New York City.
