= Secret Valley (disambiguation) =

Secret Valley is an Australian children's television adventure series.

Secret Valley may also refer to:

- Secret Valley (film), a 1937 film
- Secret Valley (Nevada), a valley in Nevada
