= Tenny Wright =

American film director

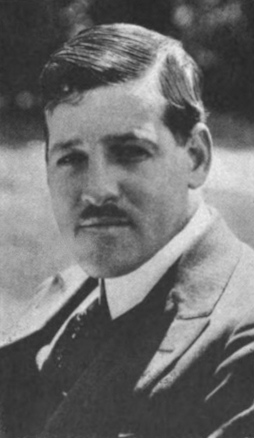
- Born: November 18, 1885; Brooklyn, New York, United States
- Died: September 13, 1971 (aged 85); Los Angeles, California, United States
- Occupation(s): Actor, Director, Production Manager

Tenny Wright (November 18, 1885 – September 13, 1971) was an American stuntman and film director. From 1929 he worked for Warner Brothers, and in 1934 was promoted to production manager where he "became an integral part of the moviemaking process".

== Selected filmography ==
=== Director ===
- The Fightin' Comeback (1927)
- Hoof Marks (1927)
- The Big Stampede (1932)
- The Telegraph Trail (1933)

=== Assistant director ===
- Milestones (1920)
- The Broken Gate (1920)
- Driftwood (1928)
- Nothing to Wear (1928)
- The Faker (1929)
- The Lone Wolf's Daughter (1929)
- Behind Closed Doors (1929)
- The Donovan Affair (1929)
- The Flying Marine (1929)
- Manhattan Parade (1931)

== Bibliography ==
- Alan K. Rode. Michael Curtiz: A Life in Film. University Press of Kentucky, 2017.
