= Willie Fung =

Chinese actor

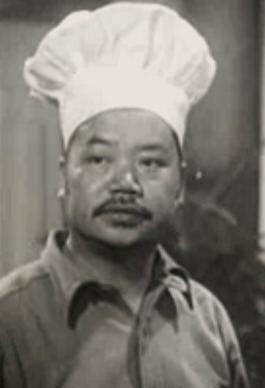
- Fung in Secret Valley (1937)
- Born: 3 March 1896; Canton, Great Qing
- Died: 16 April 1945 (aged 49); Los Angeles, California, U.S.
- Resting place: Angelus-Rosedale Cemetery
- Other names: Willy Fung
- Occupation: Actor
- Years active: 1922–1944

Willie Fung (3 March 1896 – 16 April 1945) was a Chinese-American character actor who played supporting roles in 125 American films from 1922 to 1944. Like many Chinese actors working in Hollywood during the era, he often played Japanese characters.

== Biography ==
Fung was born in Canton during the waning years of the Qing Dynasty. He made a name for himself as an actor on the stage in San Francisco. After moving to Los Angeles after his uncle's peanut business collapsed during the Depression of 1920-1921, Fung made his film debut in 1922 in Hurricane's Gal. The majority of his roles were in Westerns and dramas.

Behind the scenes, he was an advocate for fair treatment of studio actors, and was reportedly an acquaintance of Jean Harlow. While maintaining his acting career, he ran his own Chinese restaurant: New Moon Café in East Hollywood.

Fung died of a coronary occlusion in Los Angeles on April 16, 1945 at the age of 49. He is buried in Angelus-Rosedale Cemetery in Los Angeles.

== Career ==
Willie Fung experienced racist typecasting throughout his career. As reported by American media historian Hal Erickson, "Chinese character actor Willie Fung spent his entire Hollywood career imprisoned by the Hollywood Stereotype Syndrome...Fung was the personification of the 'Yellow Peril' [...] buck-toothed, pigtailed, pidgin-English-spouting comedy relief."

Despite being in 125 films over the course of 22 years of acting, his efforts were unappreciated during his time due to racism, and afterwards by critics and historians for having played racially stereotyped roles.

== Partial filmography ==
Year	Title	Role	Notes
1922	Hurricane's Gal	Sing	
1922	Broken Chains	Chinese Man	Uncredited
1923	Thundergate	Minor Role	Uncredited
1923	Her Temporary Husband		Uncredited
1924	The Breaking Point	Chinese Cook	Uncredited
1924	The Iron Horse	Chinaman	Uncredited
1924	Thundering Hoofs	Cook	Uncredited
1926	The Blackbird	Chinese Man	Uncredited
1926	Chip of the Flying U	Chinese Cook	Uncredited
1926	The Two-Gun Man	Quong	
1926	The Road to Mandalay	Man in Bar	Uncredited
1926	The Blackbird	Chinese Man	Uncredited
1926	The Yellow Back	Chinese	
1926	Twinkletoes	Chinaman	Uncredited
1926	Tell It to the Marines	Guard at door of besieged clinic	Uncredited
1927	Whispering Smith Rides	Wong	
1927	Old San Francisco	Chang Sue Lee's laughing servant	Uncredited
1928	The Way of the Strong	Chinese Cook	Uncredited
1929	Chinatown Nights	One of Riley's Henchmen	Uncredited
1929	The Far Call	Wing	
1929	Where East Is East	Servant	Uncredited
1929	The Black Book	Tin Lung	Serial
1929	The Delightful Rogue	Hi Lee (the cook)	Uncredited
1929	The Virginian	Hong	Uncredited
1929	Shanghai Lady	Bill Collector	Uncredited
1930	The Lone Star Ranger	The Barber	Uncredited
1930	The Ship from Shanghai	Shanghai Nightclub Patron	Uncredited
1930	Dangerous Paradise	Wang	Alternative title: Two Against Death
1930	The Bad One		Uncredited
1930	Shadow Ranch	Camp Cook	Uncredited
1930	The Sea God	Sin Lee	
1930	River's End	Eskimo	Uncredited
1931	Gun Smoke	Wong	
1931	Three Girls Lost	Chinese Headwaiter	Uncredited
1931	Night Nurse	Hospital Patient	Uncredited
1931	Chinatown After Dark	Ling Chi	Uncredited
1931	West of Broadway	Wing, the cook	
1932	Union Depot	Chinese Man	Uncredited
1932	Panama Flo	Bartender at Sadie's Place	Uncredited
1932	Shanghai Express	Train Engineer	Uncredited
1932	The Hatchet Man	Notary Fung Loo / Bomb maker	Uncredited
1932	Carnival Boat	Chino	Uncredited
1932	The Mouthpiece	Chinese Waiter	Uncredited
1932	Roar of the Dragon	Chinese Sailor with Rifle	Uncredited
1932	The Painted Woman	Dealer	Uncredited
1932	One Way Passage	Hong Kong curio dealer	Uncredited
1932	Red Dust	Hoy	
1932	The Mask of Fu Manchu	Ship's Steward	Uncredited
1932	Self Defense	Charlie	
1932	The Son-Daughter	Chinese Merchant	Uncredited
1933	The Bitter Tea of General Yen	Officer	Uncredited
1933	The Cohens and Kellys in Trouble	Ah Chung	Uncredited
1933	The Thrill Hunter	Wong, the Cook	
1933	Cocktail Hour	Mori	Uncredited
1933	Don't Bet on Love	Charley Lee	Uncredited
1933	The Narrow Corner	Ah Kay, Saunder's Servant	
1933	Tugboat Annie	Chow, the Cook	Uncredited
1933	Ladies Must Love	Mr. Wong	Uncredited
1933	Meet the Baron	Chinese Man	Uncredited
1934	Gambling Lady	Ching - Syndicate Board Member	Uncredited
1934	Crime Doctor	Wah-Sing	Uncredited
1934	You Belong to Me	Waiter	Uncredited
1934	A Lost Lady	Forrester's cook	
1934	Happiness Ahead	Chinese Headwaiter	Uncredited
1934	I Sell Anything	Charlie	Uncredited
1934	Gunfire	Camp Cook	
1934	Red Morning	Ship's Steward	
1934	Sequoia	Sang Soo	
1935	Ruggles of Red Gap	Willie - Chinese Servant	Uncredited
1935	Rocky Mountain Mystery	Ling Yat	
1935	Chinatown Squad	Driver	Uncredited
1935	Oil for the Lamps of China	Kin	
1935	Shanghai	Wang	Credited as Willy Fung
1935	Hop-Along Cassidy	Salem	
1935	China Seas	Cabin Boy Ah Sing	Uncredited
1935	One-Way Ticket	Wing	
1936	Call of the Prairie	Wong	
1936	Small Town Girl	So-So	Alternative title: One Horse Town
1936	Yellowstone	Chinese Cook	Uncredited
1936	The General Died at Dawn	Bartender	
1936	White Hunter	Wong	
1936	Happy Go Lucky	Coolie Fisherman	
1936	Stowaway	Chang	
1936	College Holiday	Chinese Man in Junk	Uncredited
1937	We Who Are About to Die	Kwong	
1937	Secret Valley	Tabasco the Cook	
1937	Lost Horizon	Bandit Leader at fuel stop-over	Uncredited
1937	Git Along Little Dogies	Sing Low	
1937	Top of the Town	Prop Man	Uncredited
1937	Come on, Cowboys	Fong	
1937	Wee Willie Winkie	Mohammet Dihn	
1937	The Red Rope	Lee Chin the Cook	Uncredited
1937	The Big Shot	Wu Ping - the Dry Cleaner	Uncredited
1937	Jungle Menace	Chiang-Houseboy	Serial
1937	The Trigger Trio	Ranch Cook	
1937	Wells Fargo	Wang - MacKay's Servant	Uncredited
1938	International Settlement	Chinese Bartender	Uncredited
1938	Border Wolves	Ling Wong	
1938	Sinners in Paradise	Ping	Alternative title: Secrets of a Sinner
1938	Pride of the West	Sing Loo	Uncredited
1938	The Road to Reno	Lame Duck	Alternative titles: The Lady and the Ranger; The Ranger and the Lady
1938	Too Hot to Handle	Willie	
1939	Honolulu	Wong	
1939	Nancy Drew... Reporter	Mandarin Cafe Proprietor	Uncredited
1939	The Gracie Allen Murder Case	Houseboy	Uncredited
1939	6,000 Enemies	Wang	
1939	The Girl and the Gambler	Yen, the Chinese Laundryman	Uncredited
1939	Maisie	Lee	
1939	Lady of the Tropics	Ling	Uncredited
1939	Hawaiian Nights	Murphy	
1939	Hollywood Cavalcade	Willie	
1939	Barricade	Yen - Cady's Major Domo	
1940	Viva Cisco Kid	Houseboy Wang	Uncredited
1940	Buck Benny Rides Again	Chinese Cook	Uncredited
1940	The Great Profile	Confucius	
1940	Seven Sinner	Charlie, Shopkeeper	Uncredited
1940	The Letter	Chung Hi	
1941	Saddle Mountain Roundup	Fang Way	
1941	Badlands of Dakota	Wong Lee	Uncredited
1941	Burma Convoy	Smitty	
1941	The Gay Falcon	Jerry	
1941	Public Enemies	Lee Hong	Alternative title: Gangs of the City
1942	North to the Klondike	Waterlily	
1942	Captains of the Clouds	Willie	
1942	The Tuttles of Tahiti	Creditor	Uncredited
1942	Tarzan's New York Adventure	Sun Lee, the Chinese Tailor	Uncredited
1942	A Desperate Chance for Ellery Queen	Chinese Waiter	Uncredited
1942	The Spoilers	Chinese Man in Jail Cell	Uncredited
1942	Meet the Stewarts	Wong the Cook	Uncredited
1942	Tortilla Flat	Chin Kee, Fisherman	Uncredited
1942	Halfway to Shanghai	Mr. Wu	
1942	Flying Tigers	Jim 'Gin' Sling - Waiter	Uncredited
1942	Destination Unknown	Farmer	
1942	The Moon and Sixpence	Tiara's Chinese Cook	Uncredited
1942	Seven Days' Leave	Les Brown's Houseboy	Uncredited
1942	The Black Swan	Chinese Cook	Uncredited
1943	They Got Me Covered	Chinese Laundry Man	Uncredited
1944	The Adventures of Mark Twain	Chinese Man	Uncredited
