= Panama Lady =

1939 film by Jack Hively

- Directed by: Jack Hively
- Written by: Garrett Fort; Michael Kanin
- Produced by: Cliff Reid
- Starring: Lucille Ball; Steffi Duna; Evelyn Brent
- Music by: Roy Webb
- Production company: RKO Pictures
- Release date: May 12, 1939
- Country: United States
- Language: English

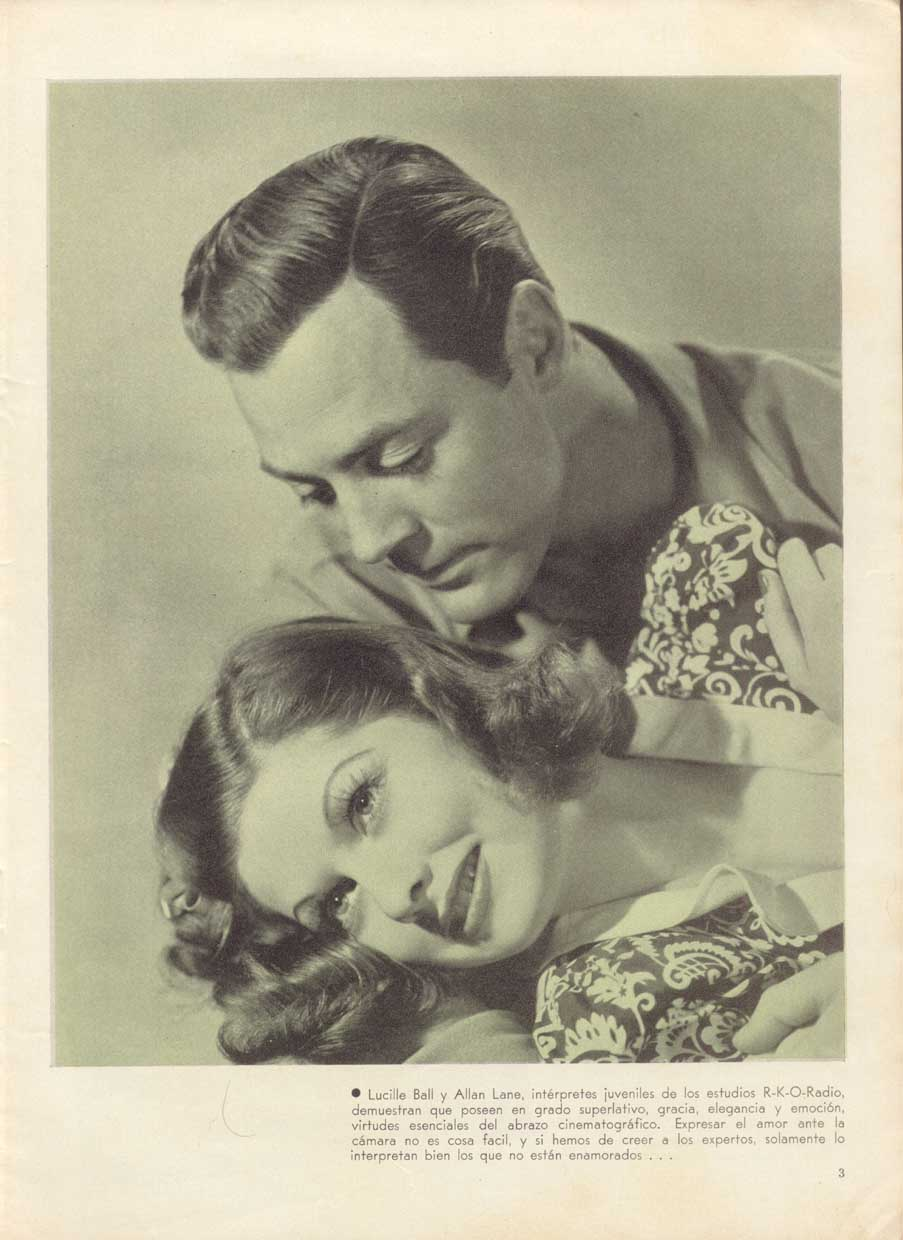
Allan Lane and Lucille Ball

Panama Lady is a 1939 drama film starring Lucille Ball and is a cleaned-up remake of the 1932 Helen Twelvetrees film vehicle Panama Flo. Lucille Ball essays the old Twelvetrees role as Lucy, a nightclub "hostess" stranded in Panama by her ex-lover Roy (Donald Briggs).

== Plot ==
Victimized by a shakedown orchestrated by tavern owner Lenore, oil rigger McTeague holds Lucy responsible. To avoid landing in jail, Lucy agrees to accompany McTeague to his oil camp as his housekeeper. Assuming that she has been brought to this godforsaken spot strictly for illicit purposes, Lucy eventually realizes that McTeague's intentions are honorable: All he wants is his money back, and he expects our heroine to work off the debt on her feet.

Ultimately, Lucy and McTeague fall in love, but not before the scurrilous Roy re-enters her life.

== Cast ==
- Lucille Ball as Lucy
- Allan Lane as McTeague
- Steffi Duna as Cheema
- Donald Briggs as Roy Harmon
- Evelyn Brent as Lenore
- Bernadene Hayes as Pearl
