= The Truth About Youth =

1930 film directed by William A. Seiter

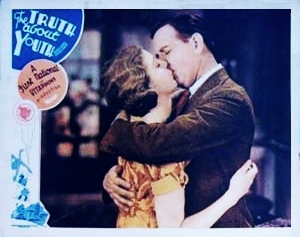
- Directed by: William A. Seiter
- Written by: B. Harrison Orkow
- Based on: When We Were Twenty-One; 1900 play by Henry V. Esmond
- Starring: Loretta Young; Myrna Loy; Conway Tearle; David Manners
- Cinematography: Arthur C. Miller
- Edited by: Fredrick Y. Smith
- Music by: Leo F. Forbstein; Erno Rapee
- Distributed by: First National
- Release date: November 3, 1930
- Running time: 69 minutes
- Country: United States
- Language: English
- Budget: $153,000
- Box office: $281,000

The Truth About Youth is a 1930 American pre-Code drama with songs produced and distributed by First National Pictures, a subsidiary of Warner Bros. Pictures. Directed by William A. Seiter, the film stars Loretta Young, Conway Tearle, David Manners and Myrna Loy. It was based on the 1900 play When We Were Twenty-One, written by Henry V. Esmond.

== Plot ==
The film.

Richard Carewe has raised Richard Dane since childhood. Dane was the son of Carewe's close friend and Carewe promised to care for his son before the friend died. Carewe plans for Dane to marry Phyllis Ericson, the daughter of his housekeeper. Phyllis, however, has no interest in Dane and is in love with Carewe. The film begins on the day of Dane's twenty-first birthday, May 19. Carewe is planning a surprise birthday party. Dane never shows up as he has gone to a nightclub to see his new girlfriend, Kara, a notorious gold-digger who sings and dances at the nightclub under the name of The Firefly. Dane returns home in the early hours of the morning drunk and carelessly drops a note from Kara on his way to his room. Early the next day, the housekeeper finds the note Dane had dropped and shows it to her daughter Phyllis, who shows the note to Carewe. As the note is addressed to "Richard", Carewe thinks quickly and pretends the note is his. Phyllis is upset as she is in love with Carewe.

When confronted with the note by Carewe, Dane gets upset and plans to elope with Kara. He goes and proposes marriage to Kara, who accepts because she thinks he is rich. After the wedding, when Kara discovers he is poor, she tells him that she never wants to see him again. Carewe, not knowing that Kara has already married Dane, offers her five thousand dollars to pretend to be his own lover in public. When Phyllis arrives at the nightclub, she almost cries when she witnesses Kara's attentions to Carewe. She leaves the nightclub. Later on, Dane arrives and is heartbroken to find Kara has sold herself a day after their wedding. Dane goes home and confesses everything to Phyllis. She realizing the truth, confesses her love for Carewe when he returns. They embrace as Carewe confesses his love for her also.

== Cast ==
- Loretta Young as Phyllis Ericson
- Conway Tearle as Richard Carewe
- David Manners as Richard Dane 'The Imp'
- Myrna Loy as Kara
- J. Farrell MacDonald as Colonel Graham
- Myrtle Stedman as Mrs. Ericson
- Harry Stubbs as Horace Palmer
- Yola d'Avril as Babette - Kara's Maid
- William Irving as Jim Greene
- Joseph E. Bernard as Headwaiter
- Ray Hallor as Hal - Dane's Pal
- William Bailey as Jim - Kara's Boyfriend

== Songs ==
- "Playing Around" (Sung by Myrna Loy)
- "I Have to Have You" (Sung by Myrna Loy)

== Box Office ==
According to Warner Bros records the film earned $231,000 domestically and $50,000 foreign.

== Preservation ==
The film survives intact at the Library of Congress and has been broadcast on both television and cable (e.g., AAP). On home video it is available from Warner Archive Collection sharing space with another Loretta Young film, The Right of Way.
