= Man of Two Worlds (film) =

1934 film by J. Walter Ruben

- Directed by: J. Walter Ruben
- Written by: Howard J. Green; Ainsworth Morgan
- Produced by: Pandro S. Berman; Merian C. Cooper
- Starring: Francis Lederer; Elissa Landi; Henry Stephenson
- Cinematography: Henry W. Gerrard
- Edited by: Jack Hively
- Music by: Bernhard Kaun
- Production company: RKO Pictures
- Distributed by: RKO Pictures
- Release date: January 13, 1934
- Running time: 92 minutes
- Country: United States
- Language: English
- Budget: $388,000
- Box office: $308,000

Man of Two Worlds is a 1934 American Pre-Code drama film directed by J. Walter Ruben and starring Francis Lederer, Elissa Landi and Henry Stephenson.

== Plot ==
A British explorer in the Arctic hires an Eskimo guide for his expedition. He is extremely skilled at his job, but he has little knowledge of Western civilization. When he travels to London he falls in love with his employer's daughter, but also struggles to adjust to the different culture.

== Cast ==
- Francis Lederer as Aigo
- Elissa Landi as Joan Pemberton
- J. Farrell MacDonald as Michael
- Henry Stephenson as Sir Basil Pemberton
- Walter Byron as Eric Pager
- Forrester Harvey as Tim
- Ivan F. Simpson as Dr. Lott
- Lumsden Hare as Captain Swan
- Christian Rub as Knudson
- Émile Chautard as Natkusiak
- Steffi Duna as Guninana
- Sarah Padden as Olago

== Box office ==
It lost $220,000. The film was a box-office disappointment for RKO.
