= The Whispering Shadow =

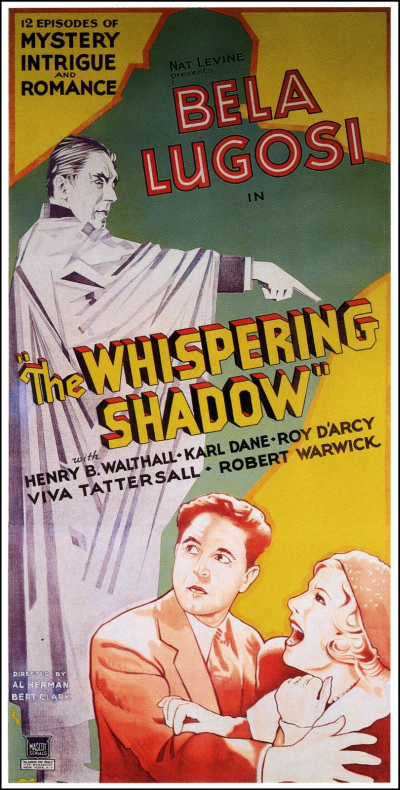
- Directed by: Colbert Clark; Albert Herman
- Cinematography: Edgar Lyons; Ernest Miller
- Music by: Lee Zahler (uncredited)
- Distributed by: Mascot Pictures
- Release date: January 21, 1933
- Running time: 12 chapters (225 minutes)
- Country: United States
- Language: English

The Whispering Shadow is a 1933 American pre-Code mystery serial film directed by Colbert Clark and Albert Herman and starring Béla Lugosi in his first of five serial roles. Lugosi received $10,000, the highest known salary of his career, for this film. The serial was filmed in 12 days and was the last role for actor Karl Dane.

== Plot ==
The Shadow in The Whispering Shadow is an underworld mastermind. He has invented a device that allows him to kill by radio control. He, along with several other persons, seeks the Czar's jewels. The series is notable for the constant false clues and decoy actions that make nearly everybody a suspect.

== Cast ==
- Bela Lugosi as Professor Adam Anton Strang
- Viva Tattersall as Vera Strang
- Malcolm McGregor as Jack Foster
- Henry B. Walthall as J.D. Bradley - Company President
- Robert Warwick as Detective Robert Raymond
- Ethel Clayton as The Countess Helen (Chapters 5-8)
- Roy D'Arcy as Professor Alexis Steinbeck
- Karl Dane as Sparks - Dispatcher
- Lloyd Whitlock as Young - Henchman No. 3
- Bob Kortman as Jasper Slade - The Convict
- Lafe McKee as D.W. Jerome - Company Vice President

== Production ==
The cinematography mimicked that of Karl Freund in Universal's Dracula - for example, using close ups of the actors' eyes - in order to take advantage of Bela Lugosi's fame as the star of that film. The shadow of The Shadow is not real; It was drawn in later by animators. Harmon and Glut comment on that "If Street & Smith, owners of the original [The] Shadow of magazine and radio fame, had found out about the owner of the whisper, they might have sued." The serial was later edited down to a feature-length edition (as was common in those days).

== Chapter titles ==
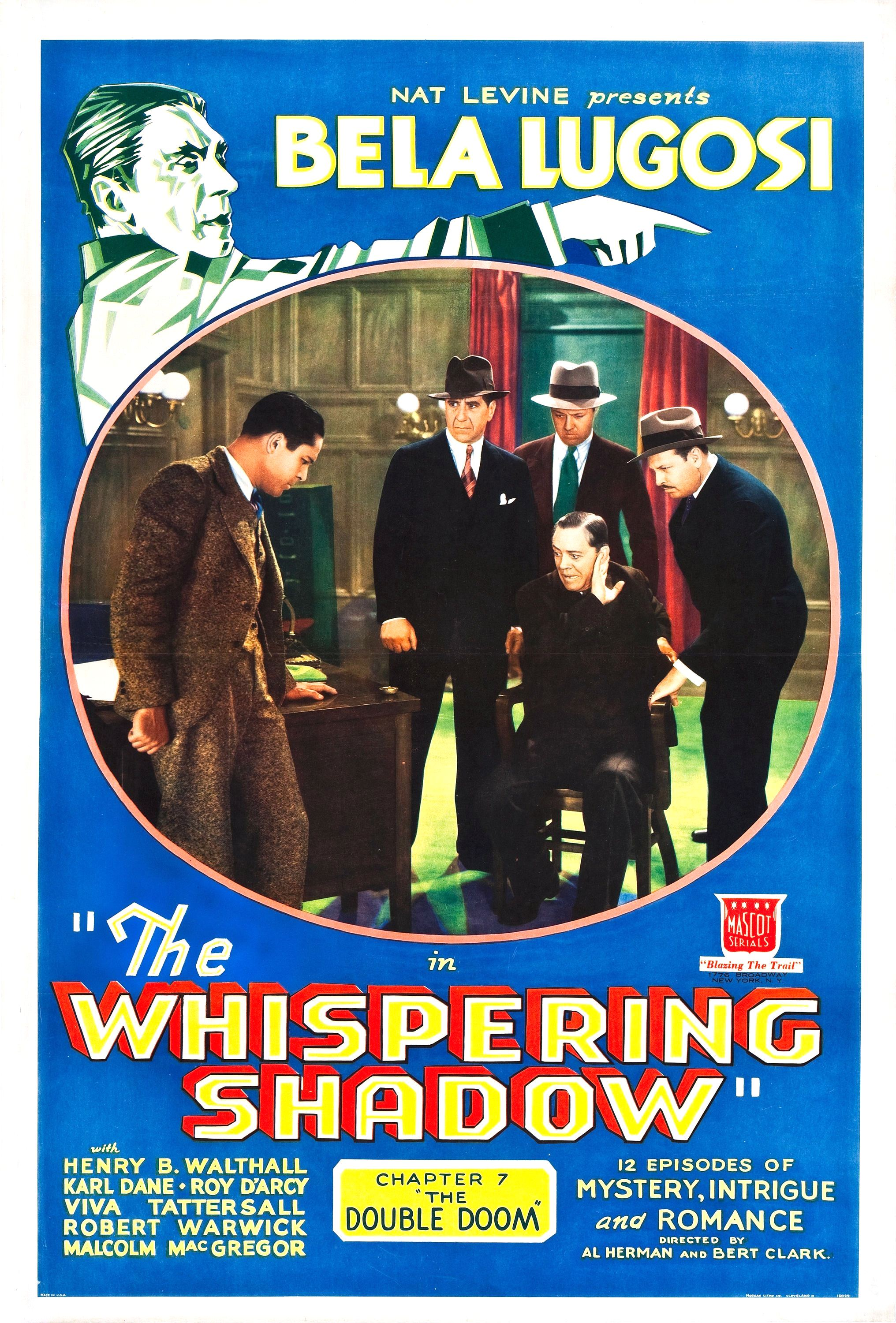
Poster for Chapter 7

1. "The Master Magician"
2. "The Collapsing Room"
3. "The All-seeing Eye"
4. "The Shadow Strikes"
5. "Wanted for Murder"
6. "The Man Who Was Czar"
7. "The Double Doom"
8. "The Red Circle"
9. "The Fatal Secret"
10. "The Death Warrant"
11. "The Trap"
12. "King of the World"

== See also ==
- Béla Lugosi filmography
- List of film serials
- List of film serials by studio

Preceded by The Devil Horse (1932)	Mascot Serial; The Whispering Shadow (1933)	Succeeded by The Three Musketeers (1933)
