= Law of the Pampas =

1939 film by Nate Watt

- Theatrical release poster
- Directed by: Nate Watt
- Screenplay by: Harrison Jacobs
- Produced by: Harry Sherman
- Starring: William Boyd; Russell Hayden; Sidney Toler; Steffi Duna; Sidney Blackmer; Pedro de Cordoba; William Duncan
- Cinematography: Russell Harlan
- Edited by: Carroll Lewis
- Music by: Victor Young; John Leipold
- Production company: Harry Sherman Productions
- Distributed by: Paramount Pictures
- Release date: November 3, 1939
- Running time: 72 minutes
- Country: United States
- Language: English

Law of the Pampas is a 1939 American Western film directed by Nate Watt and written by Harrison Jacobs. The film stars William Boyd, Russell Hayden, Sidney Toler, Steffi Duna, Sidney Blackmer, Pedro de Cordoba and William Duncan. The film was released on November 3, 1939, by Paramount Pictures. Hungarian-born Steffi Duna plays a convincing Argentine senorita and Sidney Toler plays a comic character. Contrary to previously published reports, David Niven does not appear in Law of the Pampas, unbilled or otherwise.

== Plot ==
Hoppy (William Boyd) and his pal Lucky (Russell Hayden) head to South America to look after a herd of cattle sold by Cassidy's boss to an Argentine rancher. Villain Ralph Merritt (Sidney Blackmer) wants to get his mitts on that cattle, and he's not above hiring the scum of the earth to do his bidding. Fortunately, Hoppy, Lucky and their new Latin American buddy Don Fernando (Sidney Toler) make short work of the bad guys in an outsized barroom brawl.

== Cast ==
- William Boyd as Hopalong Cassidy
- Russell Hayden as Lucky Jenkins
- Sidney Toler as Don Fernando 'Ferdy' Maria Lopez Ramirez
- Steffi Duna as Chiquita
- Sidney Blackmer as Ralph Merritt
- Pedro de Cordoba as Señor Jose Valdez
- William Duncan as Buck Peters
- Anna Demetrio as Dolores Ramirez
- Eddie Dean as Henchman Curly
- Glenn Strange as Henchman Slim
- Jo Jo La Savio as Ernesto Tito Valdez
- The King's Men as Singing Cowhands
