= Alaska (1944 film) =

1944 film by George Archainbaud

- Directed by: George Archainbaud
- Screenplay by: George Wallace Sayre; Harrison Orkow; Malcolm Stuart Boylan
- Produced by: Lindsley Parsons
- Starring: Kent Taylor; Margaret Lindsay; John Carradine
- Distributed by: Monogram Pictures
- Release date: November 18, 1944
- Running time: 76 minutes
- Country: United States
- Language: English

Alaska is a 1944 American crime adventure film directed by George Archainbaud. It stars Kent Taylor, Margaret Lindsay, and John Carradine. The film has the alternative titles of Jack London's Alaska and Flush of Gold

== Plot ==
Gary Corbett kills a pair of claim jumpers who did likewise to his father. He is charged with murder, but cannot be taken to Juneau to stand trial until the weather permits. Marshal John Masters keeps him in town until the prisoner can be moved.

Roxie Reagan, who sings at Tom LaRue's saloon, falls in love with Corbett, but she is trapped in a loveless marriage to John Reagan, an alcoholic has-been actor. LaRue also is in love with Roxie, and he and a local judge are suspected by Corbett of being in cahoots with the claim jumpers.

LaRue tries to frame Corbett for another murder, then sets the jail on fire. John Reagan courageously comes to Corbett's rescue, losing his own life in the process. The marshal deals with LaRue, but suddenly reveals that he is the one who has been backing the murderous claim jumpers all along. Corbett manages to get the better of Masters, then sets sail for San Francisco with his bride-to-be, Roxie.

== Cast ==
- Kent Taylor as Corbett
- Margaret Lindsay as Roxie
- John Carradine as John Reagan
- Dean Jagger as Marshal Masters
- Nils Asther as Thomas Leroux
- Iris Adrian as Kitty
- George Cleveland as Pete - Postmaster
- Dewey Robinson as Nick
- Lee 'Lasses' White as Judge Mark Bennett
- John Rogers Stumpy
- Earle Hodgins as Tobin
- Glenn Strange as Miner

== Reception ==
TV Guide found the movie to be a low budget throwaway in which the cast of actors was wasted.

== Production ==
While set in Alaska, the movie was filmed in Monogram Ranch, California.

== See also ==
- List of American films of 1944
