= Panama Flo =

1932 film

- Directed by: Ralph Murphy
- Screenplay by: Garrett Fort
- Produced by: Charles R. Rogers
- Starring: Helen Twelvetrees; Robert Armstrong; Charles Bickford; Marjorie Peterson; Maude Eburne
- Cinematography: Arthur C. Miller
- Edited by: Edward Schroeder; Charles Craft
- Music by: Arthur Lange
- Production company: RKO Pictures
- Distributed by: RKO Pictures
- Release date: January 19, 1932
- Running time: 74 minutes
- Country: United States
- Language: English

Panama Flo is a 1932 American pre-Code drama film directed by Ralph Murphy and written by Garrett Fort. The film stars Helen Twelvetrees, Robert Armstrong, Charles Bickford, Marjorie Peterson and Maude Eburne. The film was released on January 19, 1932, by RKO Pictures.

In the film, an American dancer is stranded in South America following the cancellation of a contract. She steals money from a wildcatter in hope of returning to New York City, but the money is in turn stolen from her. The wildcatter forces the captured dancer to work as his housekeeper to repay her debt. They live together in a jungle area. The dancer's boyfriend contacts her with a money-making scheme, but he turns out to be untrustworthy.

== Plot ==
In New York City, chorus girl Flo slips into a speakeasy and says that she is being followed. She then orders a drink. A man is buzzed into the speakeasy and it turns out that he was following Flo. The two know each other and the man tells Flo she must return with him to South America. Flashback to Sadie's Place in South America a few years ago. Flo is stranded and broke when her dance troupe's contract is canceled. Sadie introduces Flo to McTeague, a wildcatter with a large bankroll, to steal his money to get back to New York. When the theft is discovered, McTeague drags Flo to where she lives. Flo had passed the money to her friend, who assisted the theft by leaving and was to meet Flo back at her apartment. Flo soon realizes her friend has run off without her and is threatened by McTeague that he will have Flo thrown in prison. After Flo pleads for mercy (while on the floor with some breast and leg exposed), McTeague is inspired to hire her as his housekeeper. She grudgingly accepts. McTeague takes Flo to his home in the jungle where he continues to harass her.

Babe, a pilot and Flo's boyfriend, left Flo for a two-week assignment the day that Flo met McTeague. Babe lands his plane that needs repairs at McTeague's. Babe is unaware of Flo's presence, but she knows he is there and sneaks away to him that night. Sadie sent Babe to rescue Flo and they pretend to not know each other. Earlier during a night of binge-drinking, McTeague had told Flo he knew where the richest oil fields are and one day he would be king. Babe finds a chance to tell Flo that McTeague is a crook and they need to find the information on the oil. The next day Babe takes off on his seaplane but lets Flo know he'll be back for her. Before Babe leaves he says he'll probably see him again in Panama. McTeague seems puzzled about the reference and leaves Flo alone to visit the natives and before leaving, gives her a loaded gun in case of trouble. Babe returns for Flo but won't leave until he find the papers regarding the oil. In his excitement over finding the papers, he reveals he is the criminal and would never marry her. Intent on getting away, Flo threatens to shoot Babe and does so when he tries to leave. McTeague realizes the Panama reference and heads home where he finds Babe dead. Flo believes she killed Babe and McTeague lets her believe it. He puts Babe's body in his plane and sinks it. McTeague sends Flo to New York.

Back to the present, Flo learns she didn't kill Babe and that McTeague shot Babe through the heart. McTeague tries to explain why he let her believe she killed Babe. Flo refuses his offer of making it up to her, tells McTeague she has no need of his money and points to a Rolls-Royce parked on the street. She tells him it belongs to the richest oilman and it's hers too. Flo leaves McTeague, approaches the car and asks the driver to let her get in and simply drive around the block. The driver refuses and she walks down the street forlornly. The owner of the car approaches and the driver tells the man he has something on his tie. The owner is McTeague and he tells the driver to follow Flo. Flo stops at a window to adjust her outdated clothing. She turns to walk away as the feet of a man are shown approaching, presumably McTeague.

== Cast ==
- Helen Twelvetrees as Flo
- Robert Armstrong as Babe
- Charles Bickford as McTeague
- Marjorie Peterson as Pearl
- Maude Eburne as Sadie
- Paul Hurst as Al
- Reina Velez as Chacra
- Hans Joby as Pilot

== Release ==
Panama Flo was previewed at the Alexandria Theatre in Glendale, California, before its general released.

== Critical reception ==
The New York Times reviewer commented that "Helen Twelvetrees is required to thread a starry-eyed path through acres of Hollywood's most ferocious jungle land, beset on the one side by hungry alligators and on the other by a wild scenario. The story offers all the coherence, credibility and realism of a hasheesh dream, and it managed to confound a startled audience last night right down to the fade-out."

International Cinematographer said that Bickford gave the film's strongest performance as the second lead, outshining stars Twelvetrees and Armstrong; the film's "abundance of color, particularly in the jungle and water scenes and general atmosphere" was noted, and reviewer George Blaisdell singled out Maude Eburne's and Paul Hurst's performances for special praise.

Variety provided a negative review and described the film as "shoddy entertainment" and commented that Helen Twelvetree’s performance was held back by "a sluggish story and situations that do not give life to the narrative or give it conviction."

Harrison's Reports also gave a negative review and described the film as "a fair melodrama", but commented that the characters were too unsympathetic to arouse much interest. The review continued with the comment, "In addition, it is demoralizing, for the theme is sexy and the characters indulge in constant drinking, especially the hero and the heroine."

Lionel Collier, for the British magazine, Picturegoer, wrote, "This is not a pretty picture, nor is it one in which it is possible to feel the slightest sympathy for any of the characters. If you object to life in the raw, invested with a good deal of sordid detail and sexiness, it will not please you." He continued to comment that it was also "undeniably interesting" and "vivid" and filled with "suspense" and therefore worth seeing. He praised the acting of Twelvetrees, Bickford and Armstrong but commented, "I hate to see Helen Twelvetrees in a part of this type."

== Remake ==
The film was remade into the Lucille Ball vehicle Panama Lady (1939), though the remake offered a sanitized version of the plot's events.
