= Steffi Duna =

Hungarian-born actress (1910–1992)

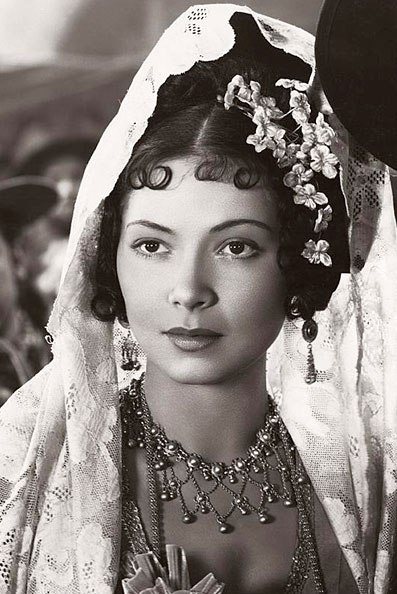
- Duna in Dancing Pirate (1936)
- Born: Erzsébet Berindey; 8 February 1910; Budapest, Austria-Hungary
- Died: 22 April 1992 (aged 82); Beverly Hills, California, U.S.
- Occupation: Actress
- Years active: 1932–1940
- Spouses: John Carroll (m. 1935; div. 1938) Dennis O'Keefe (m. 1940; died 1968)
- Children: 2

Steffi Duna (born Erzsébet Berindey; 8 February 1910 – 22 April 1992) was a Hungarian-born film actress.

== Hungarian dancer ==
Born in the Eastern name order in Budapest of Czech extraction and nicknamed Stefi (Stefánia) by her friends and family, Duna started dancing at the age of nine and first attracted attention as a thirteen-year-old ballet dancer in Europe. She made her first stage appearance in dramatized fairy tales at the Children's Theater of Budapest. Initially opposed to the idea, her father sent her to the best schools in the Hungarian capital to learn dancing, and soon she had danced in most of the capitals of Europe.

In 1932, she appeared on the London stage in Noël Coward's revue Words and Music as one of the four actresses to create the song "Mad About the Boy".

== Film actress ==
When she came to Hollywood in 1932, Duna could not speak a word of English. She made up her mind to learn quickly. Directors advised her to stay away from her Hungarian friends to speed up her learning. Within a few years, she could speak not only English but five other languages.

During the 1930s, she played a variety of nationalities. However, despite her European background, she was often cast as fiery Latin femmes fatale in films that made full use of her exotic and glamorous persona, such as La Cucaracha (1934), the first live-action short film made in three-strip Technicolor.

She made her film debut in The Indiscretions of Eve (1932) in the starring role (along with Jessica Tandy, also making her debut). Signed by RKO Radio Pictures, she played Guninana, the Eskimo wife of Francis Lederer, in Man of Two Worlds (1934). Lederer had performed with Duna in the Berlin, Germany production of Die Wunderbar.

In 1936, she played Nedda in the British film version of Pagliacci, starring Richard Tauber. Films in which she played lead roles, such as Panama Lady (1939) with Lucille Ball, were popular but did not make her a major star. Her best remembered films include Anthony Adverse (1936) and Waterloo Bridge (1940).

== Personal life and death ==
Duna was married twice. Her first marriage was in 1935 to actor John Carroll, her co-star in the screen comedy Hi, Gaucho!. They had one child, a daughter, and divorced in 1938.

On October 18, 1940, Duna married actor Dennis O'Keefe in Phoenix, Arizona. They had a son.

Duna died on 22 April 1992 (aged 82) of cancer at her home in Beverly Hills.

== Partial filmography ==
- The Indiscretions of Eve (1932) as Eve
- The Iron Stair (1933) as Elsa Damond
- Man of Two Worlds (1934) as Guninana
- La Cucaracha (1934, Short) as Chaquita
- Red Morning (1934) as Kara Perava
- One New York Night (1935) as Countess Louise Broussiloff
- Hi, Gaucho! (1935) as Inez del Campo
- La Fiesta de Santa Barbara (1935, Short) as Herself
- I Conquer the Sea! (1936) as Rosita Gonzales
- Dancing Pirate (1936) as Serafina Perena
- Anthony Adverse (1936) as Neleta
- Pagliacci (1936) - Nedda Salvatini
- Escape by Night (1937) as Josephine 'Jo' Elliott
- Rascals (1938) as Stella
- Flirting with Fate (1938) as Carlita
- Panama Lady (1939) as Cheema
- The Girl and the Gambler (1939) as Dolores 'The Dove' Romero
- The Magnificent Fraud (1939) as Carmelita
- Way Down South (1939) as Pauline
- Hitler – Beast of Berlin (1939) as Elsa Memling
- Law of the Pampas (1939) as Chiquita
- The Marines Fly High (1940) as Teresa
- Waterloo Bridge (1940) as Lydia
- Phantom Raiders (1940) as Dolores
- The Great McGinty (1940) as The Dancing Girl
- River's End (1940) as Cheeta
- Girl from Havana (1940) as Chita (final film role)

== Sources ==
- Bismarck Tribune, "Steffi Duna Important Character In Picture", Wednesday, November 20, 1935, p. 8.
- Hammond Times, "Hollywood", March 16, 1939, p. 35.
- Oakland Tribune, "Money-Important In Marriage, Or Is It?", Sunday, November 26, 1939, p. 79.
- Salisbury Times, "Dennis O'Keefe Picks That As Official Name", Monday Evening, August 28, 1944, p. 5.

== Literature ==
- Priscilla Peña Ovalle. Dance and the Hollywood Latina: Race, Sex, and Stardom (2011) p. 8
- Anthony Slide. The New Historical Dictionary of the American Film Industry 2nd edition. Chicago and London: Fitzroy Dearborn 1998. 266 pp, ISBN 1 57958 056 4
