= The Telegraph Trail =

1933 film

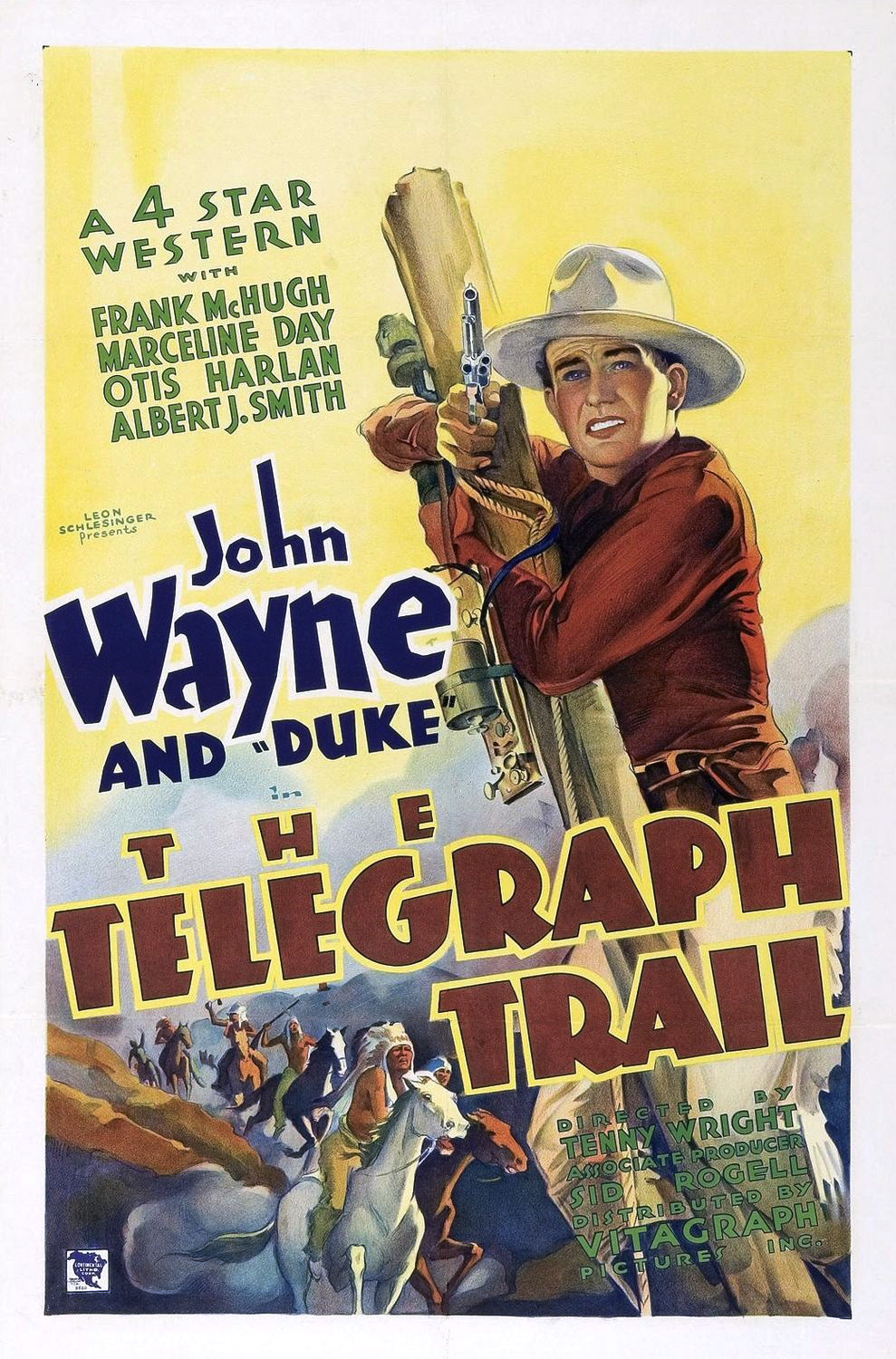
- Theatrical poster
- Directed by: Tenny Wright
- Written by: Kurt Kempler
- Produced by: Leon Schlesinger
- Starring: John Wayne; Frank McHugh; Marceline Day; Otis Harlan; Albert J. Smith
- Cinematography: Ted McCord
- Edited by: William Clemens
- Music by: Leo F. Forbstein
- Production company: Leon Schlesinger Productions
- Distributed by: Warner Bros. Pictures
- Release date: March 18, 1933
- Running time: 54 minutes
- Country: United States
- Language: English

The Telegraph Trail is a 1933 American pre-Code Western film directed by Tenny Wright and starring John Wayne and Frank McHugh. The film also starred stuntman Yakima Canutt as Indian Chief High Wolf, Marceline Day as the heroine, and Duke the Wonder Horse as John Wayne's trusty steed.

== Plot ==
A vile scoundrel named Gus Lynch stirs up trouble with the local Indians led by Chief High Wolf, convincing them that if the white man is successful in building a telegraph line through their territory, the Indians will all be eventually eliminated. High Wolf leads his braves to attack and kill a crew of white men they find stringing up telegraph wires in the wilderness. John Trent's best friend is killed in the attack and he leads the townspeople to go out into the Indian lands and finish setting up the telegraph system themselves. Meanwhile, Lynch proposes marriage to the beautiful Alice Keller, who just recently arrived in town with her comical Uncle Zeke. She tells Lynch that she is already engaged to the handsome John Trent, which sets up a fierce rivalry between Trent and Lynch.

The Indians attack the telegraph company's wagon train in a fierce battle out on the plains, and John Trent rides heroically for help and brings back the cavalry just in time to stop the townspeople from being massacred. Trent's sidekick Corporal Tippy gets drunk during the attack, and he and an inebriated Uncle Zeke share some tense but comical scenes during the battle as, drunkenly oblivious to the danger, they use the circling Indian braves for target practice. Chief High Wolf is mortally wounded astride his horse while watching the battle from a distance and when he sees Gus Lynch abandoning him, he uses the last of his energy to shoot Lynch in the back. Trent winds up in a romantic embrace with Alice.

== Cast ==
- John Wayne as John Trent
- Frank McHugh as Corporal Tippy
- Marceline Day as Alice Keller
- Otis Harlan as Uncle Zeke Keller
- Albert J. Smith as Gus Lynch
- Yakima Canutt as High Wolf
- Lafe McKee as Lafe
- Duke as John Wayne's horse
