= Ben Orkow =

American author

Ben Harrison Orkow (1896–1988) was an American screenplay, theatre, and science fiction writer of Russian descent. He was professionally known as either B. Harrison Orkow or Ben Orkow.

== Biography ==
Orkow was born on January 9, 1896, in Korna or Korma, Russian Empire, to Abe and Anita Orkow. He moved to the United States in 1906 and was educated privately to the equivalent of a university degree.

Orkow married his first wife actress Vera "Viva" Tattersall in 1921. They divorced in the late 1920s. He was then married to Evelyne Arends, who sued for divorce in 1930. He later married Ruby Jewel Dreyer with whom he had a child, Miriam Orkow Biro. Orkow died at the age of 92 died on December 11, 1988, in Reno, Nevada.

== Career ==
Orkow was the author of a number of plays produced on Broadway; among his credits are 16 screenplays for major movie studies and 20 television dramas.

One of the plays he wrote is The First Actress, in which Felicia, a theatre enthusiast, disguises herself as a man to sneak into the theatre group of William Shakespeare and Richard Burbage. Women were banned at that time from acting in the theatre – which leads to the expected complications. At a performance in the presence of Queen Elizabeth I everything comes out at the end, but Felicia is forgiven. The plot is very reminiscent of that of Shakespeare in Love (1998).

His first science fiction novel When Time Stood Still, which was published by Signet in 1962. It is about a millionaire and his terminally ill wife who travel to the future of 2007, where it is possible to cure the woman's disease. The book has been translated into a number of languages including Italian and German.

== Selected filmography ==
- 1930: The Truth About Youth
- 1930: The Gorilla
- 1932: Hell's House
- 1939: Boy Slaves
- 1942: Wings for the Eagle
- 1944: Army Wives
- 1944: Alaska

== Selected bibliography ==
- My Mistress My Wife (1934, novel)
- When Time Stood Still (1962, novel)

== Selected plays ==
- The First Actress: A Play in three Acts (1976, play)

== Reference material ==
- Hans Joachim Alpers, Werner Fuchs, Ronald M. Hahn: "Reclam's science fiction guide." Reclam, Stuttgart 1982, ISBN 3- 15-010312-6, p. 315.
- Hans Joachim Alpers, Werner Fuchs, Ronald M. Hahn, Wolfgang Jeschke: "Lexicon of Science Fiction Literature." Heyne, Munich 1991, ISBN 3-453-02453-2, pp. 766 f.
- John Clute: "Orkow, Ben." In: John Clute, Peter Nicholls: "The Encyclopedia of Science Fiction". 3rd edition (online edition), version dated April 4, 2017.
- Robert Reginald: "Science Fiction and Fantasy Literature. A Checklist, 1700–1974 with Contemporary Science Fiction Authors II". Gale, Detroit 1979, ISBN 0-8103-1051-1, pp. 1024.
- Robert Reginald: "Contemporary Science Fiction Authors". Arno Press, New York 1974, ISBN 0-405-06332-6, pp. 210 f.
- Donald H. Tuck: "The Encyclopedia of Science Fiction and Fantasy through 1968". Advent, Chicago 1974, ISBN 0-911682-20-1, pp. 338.
