= Viva Tattersall =

British actress (born 1898–1989)

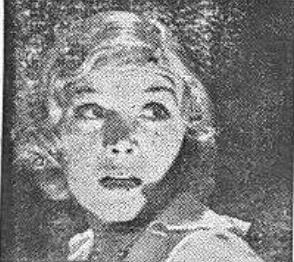
- Born: 1 April 1898; Fulham, London, England
- Died: 19 January 1989 (aged 90); Loma Linda, California, U.S.
- Other names: Vera Tattersall Orkow; Viva Toler
- Occupations: Actress; playwright
- Years active: 1932-1936 (film)
- Spouse(s): Ben Orkow (m. 1921–1937); Sidney Toler (m. 1943–1947)

Viva Tattersall (1898–1989) was the stage name of British stage and film actress, playwright and sculptor, Vera Tattersall, who settled in the United States.

== Early life ==
Tattersall was one of five girls born in London to Hugh Tattersall, a sea captain, and his wife, Lilian. Her father had been blamed for a ship's loss and never worked again. Lilian worked as a dressmaker but supplemented her income by playing the stocks and shares. Tattersall's sisters included Lady Emma Henderson and Marjorie Clark, wife of economist, Colin Clark.

== Career ==
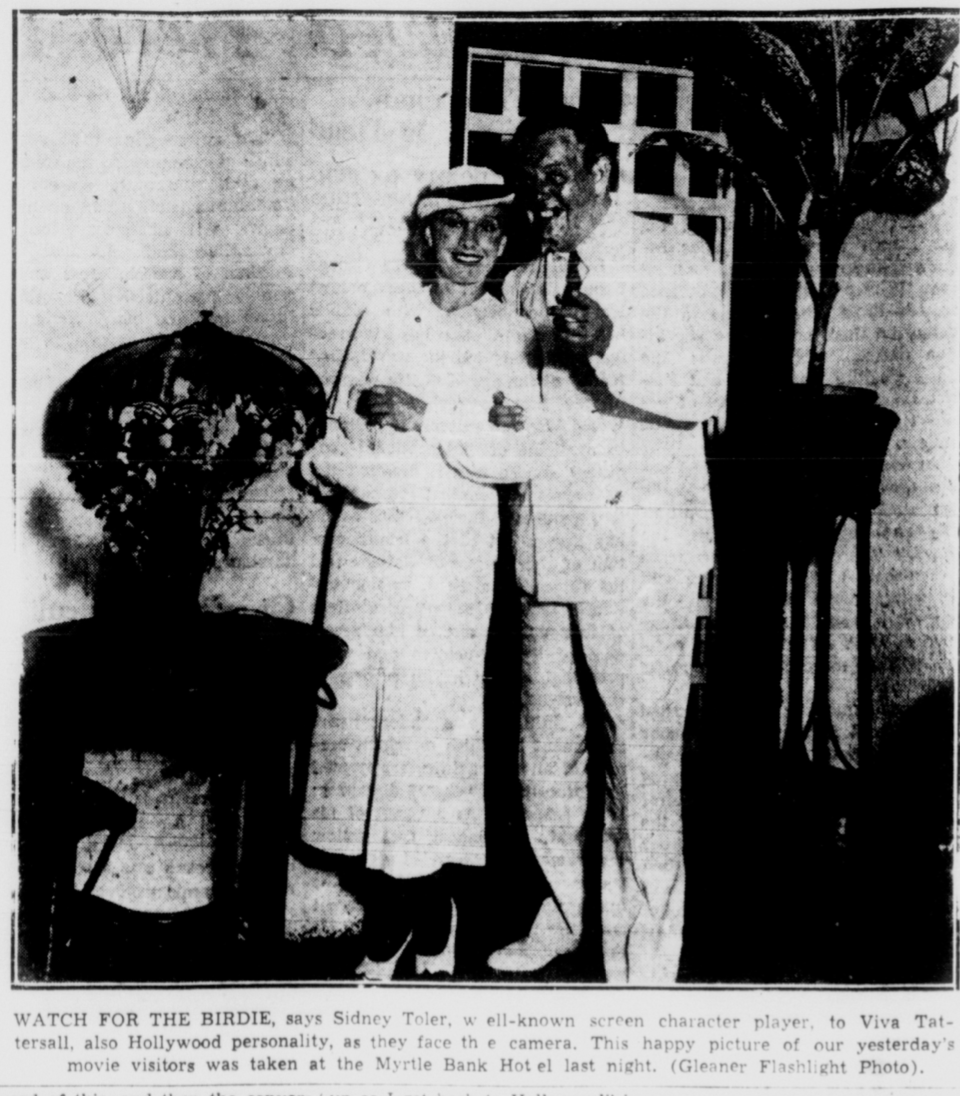
Sidney Toler and Viva Tattersall in Jamaica 1936

Tattersall commenced her career as a stage actress. In 1927 she appeared in the original Broadway run of John Galsworthy's Escape. She was also a playwright, co-authoring plays with actor Sidney Toler (who she later married) such as Her Western Romeo, Dress Parade and Ritzy.

She appeared in at least eight Hollywood films between 1932 and 1936. This included a leading role as the daughter, Vera Strang, of Professor Adam Anton Strang, played by Bela Lugosi, in the serial film, The Whispering Shadow.

== Personal life ==
Tattersall married screenwriter B. Harrison Orkow (aka Ben Orkow) in Manhattan in 1921. They divorced in New York in the late 1920s.

Tattersall (then known as Vera Tattersall Orkow) married Sidney Toler in 1943, four weeks after his previous wife, actress Vivian Marston, died. At the time she was described as working as a sculptor. Their marriage lasted until Toler's death in September 1947.

In 1972, she was living in the Brookside Patios Apartments, under the name Viva Toler, in Redlands, California.

She died on 19 January 1989 (aged 90) in Loma Linda, California.

== Selected filmography ==
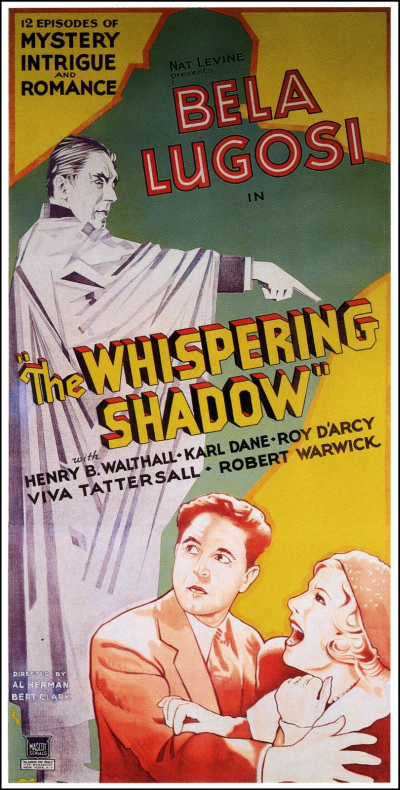
Tattersall featured on a poster for the Whispering Shadow

- Cynara (1932)
- Looking Forward (1933)
- The Whispering Shadow (1933)
- Picture Brides (1934)
- Without Regret (1935)
- The Call of the Savage (1935)
- The Widow from Monte Carlo (1935)
- The Unguarded Hour (1936)

== Bibliography ==
- Allan R. Ellenberger. Miriam Hopkins: Life and Films of a Hollywood Rebel. University Press of Kentucky, 2017.
- Thomas S. Hischak. Broadway Plays and Musicals: Descriptions and Essential Facts of More Than 14,000 Shows through 2007. McFarland, 2009.
