= Ritzy (play) =

1930 play by Sidney Toler and Viva Tattersall

- Written by: Sidney Toler; Viva Tattersall
- Original language: English
- Genre: Comedy

Premiere
- Date premiered: February 10, 1930
- Place premiered: Longacre Theatre, New York City

Ritzy is a 1930 comedy play by Sidney Toler and Viva Tattersall. It ran for 32 performances at the Longacre Theatre on Broadway with a cast that included Miriam Hopkins and Ernest Truex. A financially struggling couple living in a cheap hotel believe they have inherited a huge sum of money, until the discovery of closer relatives means they will not receive the fortune.

== Bibliography ==
- Allan R. Ellenberger. Miriam Hopkins: Life and Films of a Hollywood Rebel. University Press of Kentucky, 2017.
- Thomas S. Hischak. Broadway Plays and Musicals: Descriptions and Essential Facts of More Than 14,000 Shows through 2007. McFarland, 2009.
