= Wings for the Eagle =

1942 film by Lloyd Bacon

- Theatrical release poster
- Directed by: Lloyd Bacon
- Screenplay by: Byron Morgan; B. Harrison Orkow; Richard Macaulay
- Produced by: Robert Lord
- Starring: Ann Sheridan; Dennis Morgan; Jack Carson; George Tobias
- Cinematography: Tony Gaudio
- Edited by: Owen Marks
- Music by: Friedrich Hollaender
- Production company: Warner Bros. Pictures
- Distributed by: Warner Bros. Pictures
- Release date: July 18, 1942
- Running time: 84 minutes
- Country: United States
- Language: English
- Box office: $1 million (US rentals)

Wings for the Eagle (aka Shadow of Their Wings) is a 1942 American drama film starring Ann Sheridan, Dennis Morgan, Jack Carson and George Tobias, directed by Lloyd Bacon. It tells the story of workers at a Lockheed aircraft assembly plant in the months preceding the attack on Pearl Harbor. It was the first of 11 films in which Morgan and Carson appeared together, though they did not become known as a movie "team" until a few years later.

== Plot ==
In 1940, Corky Jones (Dennis Morgan) and Gil Borden (Don DeFore) come to Burbank, California, looking for jobs. They get work at the Lockheed aircraft factory. Corky stays with his friend Brad Maple (Jack Carson) and his wife Roma (Ann Sheridan) Brad is unemployed.

At work, Corky befriends Jake Hanso (George Tobias) and his son Pete (Russell Arms). Pete is studying to become a military pilot. Corky rents a room from Jake after Brad becomes jealous of him. Jake is a supervisor at the plant, born abroad, who loses his job because he is not a citizen.

Roma leaves Brad. Corky begins dating Roma, and the two men fight over her, creating a romantic triangle. When the Japanese launch a sneak attack on Pearl Harbor, Pete reports for service. He is killed in action.

Corky joins the military as an air cadet, and he arranges for Roma and Brad to get back together. On an early mission his plane shoots down two Japanese fighters, fulfilling a request from Jake by avenging Pete's death.

== Cast ==
- Ann Sheridan as Roma Maple
- Dennis Morgan as Corky Jones
- Jack Carson as Brad Maple
- George Tobias as Jake Hanso
- Russell Arms as Pete Hanso
- Don DeFore as Gil Borden
- Tom Fadden as Tom "Cyclone" Shaw
- John Ridgely as Johnson
- Frank Wilcox as Stark
- George Meeker as Personnel Man
- Fay Helm as Miss Baxter
- Billy Curtis as Midget
- Emory Parnell as Policeman
- Edgar Dearing as Motorcycle Officer

== Production ==
Wings for the Eagle, originally titled Shadow of Their Wings was partly set in Burbank, California near the Lockheed Corporation which had built a production facility where 45 buildings spread out over 550 acres. Warner Bros. Pictures received permission to shoot at the Lockheed plant, but, for security reasons, the film crew and actors were instructed to keep a birth certificate on them at all times. The original casting had Ronald Reagan co-starring with Dennis Morgan but he was replaced by Morgan and Jack Carson became the "sidekick".

Warner Bros. advertised the connection with Lockheed in a full-page ad in Life magazine, dedicating the film, "to the workers who actually build Wings for the Eagle. To the workers of America's Fighting aircraft industry ... men and women devoted to the new gospel "We can! We must! We Will!" (Note: Despite Lockheed factory staff working in close proximity with the Warner Bros. operation, not one day of aircraft production was lost.)

Wings for the Eagle was churned out quickly between January 12–February 1942 at both the Lockheed plant and the Curtiss-Wright Aircraft Company in Buffalo, New York, using a near-documentary film style. At the conclusion of the production, Sheridan, Morgan and Carson went on war bond tours together. Later, Morgan and Carson would visit hospitals and camps throughout the South Pacific during the war.

Aviation film historian Stephen Pendo in Aviation in the Cinema (1985) described how Wings for the Eagle benefited from its association with Lockheed, especially being able to photograph the ceremony highlighting the rollout of the 2,000th aircraft produced for the war effort. An interesting anecdote involved "Billy Curtis, a midget, who showed one way of solving a fuselage construction problem."

== Reception ==
The New York Times called Wings for the Eagle "a rather substantial and satisfying film," but said it "doesn't have the tight construction of its planes and it lacks some of the flaring excitement of films devoted mainly to scenes of air combat." The Los Angeles Times said the film won't make motion picture history but "is a satisfactory enough passing event, important now."
