= Red Morning =

1934 film directed by Wallace Fox

- Directed by: Wallace Fox; Ray Lissner (assistant)
- Screenplay by: John Twist; Wallace Fox
- Story by: Gouverneur Morris
- Produced by: Cliff Reid
- Starring: Steffi Duna; Regis Toomey; Raymond Hatton; Mitchell Lewis
- Cinematography: Harold Wenstrom
- Edited by: Ted Cheesman
- Music by: Al Colombo
- Production company: RKO Radio Pictures
- Release date: December 14, 1934 (US)
- Running time: 66 minutes
- Country: United States
- Language: English

Red Morning is a 1934 American adventure film directed by Wallace Fox from a screenplay by John Twist and Wallace Fox, based on a story by Gouverneur Morris. The film stars Steffi Duna, Regis Toomey, Raymond Hatton, and Mitchell Lewis.

== Cast ==
- Steffi Duna as Kara Perava
- Regis Toomey as John Hastings
- Raymond Hatton as Hawker
- Mitchell Lewis as Captain Perava
- Charles Middleton as Stanchon
- George J. Lewis as Mao
- Francis McDonald as Sakki
- Pat West as Glibb
- Brandon Hurst as Island Magistrate
- Willie Fung as Ship's Steward
- Olaf Hytten as McTavish
- Alphonse Ethier as The Village Chief
- Lionel Belmore as The Storekeeper
- James Marcus as The Hotel Keeper
- Pope Epili Cakobau as Native (uncredited)
- George Regas as Native (uncredited)
- Constantine Romanoff as Mutinous Seaman (uncredited)
