= Hoof Marks =

1927 film

- Directed by: Tenny Wright
- Written by: Joseph Anthony Roach
- Starring: Jack Donovan; Ed Brady; Edward Cecil
- Cinematography: Roy Greiner; Edward Snyder
- Production company: Fred J. McConnell Productions
- Distributed by: Pathe Exchange
- Release date: November 13, 1927
- Running time: 50 minutes
- Country: United States
- Languages: Silent; English intertitles

Hoof Marks is a 1927 American silent Western film directed by Tenny Wright and starring Jack Donovan, Ed Brady and Edward Cecil.

== Cast ==
- Jack Donovan as Cal Wagner
- Ed Brady as Rawhide Smith
- Edward Cecil as Harold Cole
- William Steele as Sam Trapp
- Peggy Montgomery as Alice Dixon
- Peggy O'Day as Henrietta Bowers
- Peggy Shaw as Marie Hudson
