= The Broken Gate =

1920 film directed by Paul Scardon

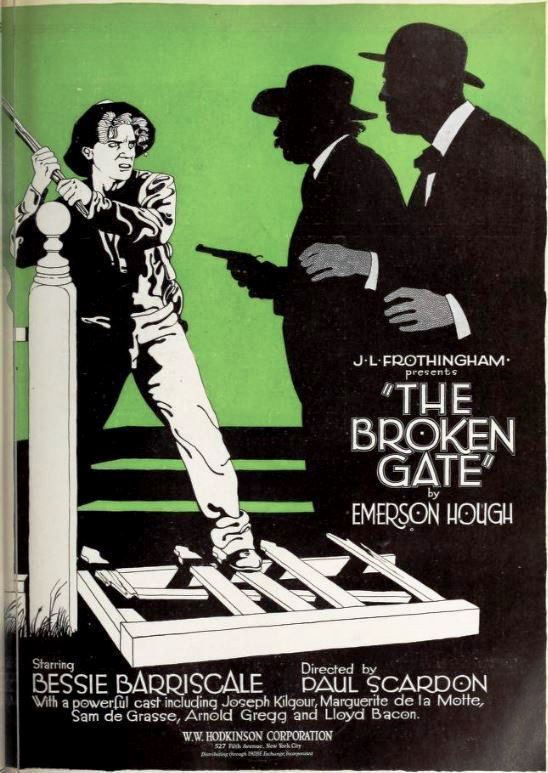
- Advertisement for the film from a 1920 issue of Exhibitors Herald
- Directed by: Paul Scardon; Tenny Wright (assistant director)
- Based on: The Broken Gate by Emerson Hough
- Starring: Bessie Barriscale; Joseph Kilgour
- Production company: J. L. Frothingham Productions
- Distributed by: W. W. Hodkinson Corporation; Pathé Exchange
- Release date: December 1920
- Running time: 6 reels
- Country: United States
- Language: Silent (English intertitles)

The Broken Gate is a 1920 American silent drama film directed by Paul Scardon and starring Bessie Barriscale. It was distributed jointly by W. W. Hodkinson and Pathé Exchange.

== Cast ==
- Bessie Barriscale as Aurora Lane
- Joseph Kilgour as William Henderson
- Sam De Grasse as 'Hod' Brooks
- Marguerite De La Motte as Anne Oglesby
- Arnold Gray as Dieudonne 'Don' Lane (credited as Arnold Gregg)
- Lloyd Bacon as John
- Evelyn Selbie as Julia Delafield
- Alfred Allen as Eph Adamson

== Preservation ==
With no prints of The Broken Gate located in any film archives, it is considered a lost film.
