= Boy Slaves =

1939 film by P. J. Wolfson

- Directed by: P. J. Wolfson
- Written by: Albert Bein (story); Ben Orkow
- Produced by: Pandro S. Berman
- Starring: Roger Daniel; Anne Shirley
- Cinematography: J. Roy Hunt
- Edited by: Desmond Marquette
- Distributed by: RKO Radio Pictures
- Release date: February 2, 1939
- Running time: 72 minutes
- Country: United States
- Language: English

Boy Slaves is a 1939 drama film starring Roger Daniel and Anne Shirley. The film was directed by P.J. Wolfson and based upon an Albert Bein story. Boy Slaves is an exposé of child labor.

== Plot ==
Runaway boy Jesse Thompson, hoping to earn enough money to support his mother, follows a gang of other boys. After an infraction gets them all in trouble, they are forced to work in a fenced and guarded turpentine camp, climbing and tapping trees. They are free to leave only if they can first pay off bills they ran up at the company store (peonage). Trapped in a state of de facto slavery, they decide to strike for better food after one boy gets dizzy from hunger and falls from a tree, resulting in the amputation of his arm. When their protest fails, the boys decide to write a letter about the conditions of their detention to the U.S. President's wife, but it is intercepted. The boys believe one of their number is a "snitch", but later discover differently.

== Cast ==
- Anne Shirley - Annie
- Roger Daniel - Jesse Thompson
- James McCallion - Tim
- Walter Ward - Miser
- Charles Powers - Lollie
- Johnny Fitzgerald - Knuckles
- Frank Malo - Tommy
- Paul White - Atlas
- Walter Tetley - Pee Wee
- Charles Lane - Albee
- Arthur Hohl - Sheriff
- Adrian Morris - State Policeman

== See also ==
- List of films featuring slavery
