= The Spitfire (1924 film) =

1924 film

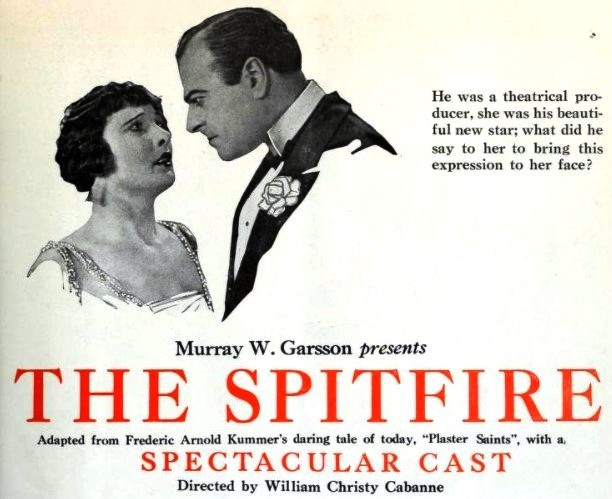
- Advertisement
- Directed by: Christy Cabanne
- Written by: Ray Harris
- Based on: Plaster Saints; 1922 novel by Frederic Arnold Kummer
- Produced by: Murray W. Garsson
- Cinematography: Jack Brown; Walter Arthur
- Distributed by: Associated Exhibitors
- Release date: May 4, 1924
- Running time: 7 reels
- Country: United States
- Language: Silent (English intertitles)

The Spitfire is a lost 1924 American silent society drama film, directed by Christy Cabanne and starring Betty Blythe and Lowell Sherman.

== Cast ==
- Betty Blythe as Jean Bronson
- Lowell Sherman as Horace Fleming
- Elliott Dexter as Douglas Kenyon
- Robert Warwick as Oliver Blair
- Pauline Garon as Marcia Walsh
- Burr McIntosh as Joshua Carrington
- Jack Donovan as Abel Carrington
- Ray Allen as Henry Hammil

== Preservation ==
With no prints of The Spitfire located in any film archive, it is a lost film.
