= Hurricane's Gal =

1922 film by Allen Holubar

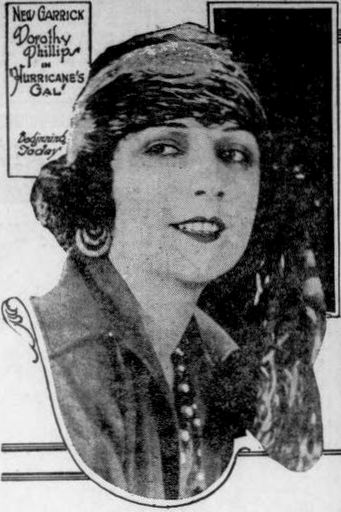
- Directed by: Allen Holubar; Harold S. Bucquet (Asst.)
- Written by: Allen Holubar
- Story by: Harvey Gates
- Produced by: Allen Holubar
- Starring: Dorothy Phillips
- Cinematography: Byron Haskin; William C. McGann
- Edited by: Frank Lawrence
- Distributed by: First National Pictures
- Release date: July 1922
- Running time: 80 minutes
- Country: United States
- Language: Silent (English intertitles)

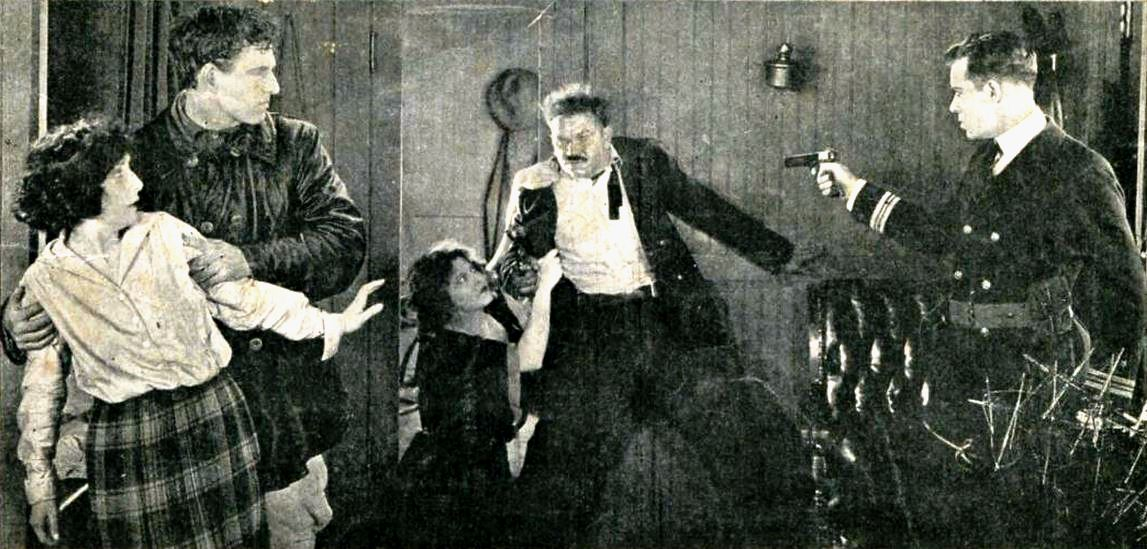
Film still.

Hurricane's Gal is a 1922 American silent adventure film produced, written and directed by Allen Holubar and starring his wife Dorothy Phillips. It was distributed through Associated First National Pictures.

== Cast ==
- Dorothy Phillips as Lola
- Robert Ellis as Steele O'Connor
- Wallace Beery as Chris Borg
- James O. Barrows as Cap'n Danny
- Gertrude Astor as Phyllis Fairfield
- Willie Fung as Sing
- Jack Donovan as Lieutenant Grant
- Frances Raymond as Mrs. Fairfield

== Preservation status ==
The film survives in Archives Du Film Du CNC (Bois d'Arcy) and Gosfilmofond, Moscow State.

== See also ==
- Gertrude Astor filmography
