= Jack Donovan (actor) =

American film actor

- Born: February 4, 1894; Chicago, Illinois, United States
- Died: January 15, 1981 (aged 86); Santa Barbara, California, United States
- Occupation: Actor
- Years active: 1920-1940 (film)

Jack Donovan (1894–1981) was an American film actor. He was active in feature films and serials during the silent and early sound eras, playing a mixture of lead and supporting roles.

== Selected filmography ==
- Milestones (1920)
- The Midlanders (1920)
- Hurricane's Gal (1922)
- The Spitfire (1924)
- Hoof Marks (1927)
- The Bullet Mark (1928)
- Captain Careless (1928)
- Twisted Rails (1934)
- Outlaw's Highway (1934)
- The Adventures of Frank Merriwell (1936, serial)

== Bibliography ==
- Jay Robert Nash, Robert Connelly & Stanley Ralph Ross. Motion Picture Guide Silent Film 1910-1936. Cinebooks, 1988.
