= Twisted Rails =

1934 film by Albert Herman

- Directed by: Albert Herman
- Written by: James R. Gilbert (screenplay); L. V. Jefferson (screenplay); L. V. Jefferson (story)
- Produced by: Peter J. White (producer)
- Cinematography: Ernest Miller; Monte Stebbins
- Distributed by: Imperial Distributing Corporation
- Release date: 1934
- Running time: 51 minutes
- Country: United States
- Language: English

Twisted Rails is a 1934 American Western film directed by Albert Herman. It was distributed by the independent Imperial Distributing Corporation for the states-rights market.

== Plot ==
A train is carrying a shipment of $50,000 in gold, and a gang attempts to get it. A railroad man is shot before revealing the name of a criminal aboard.

== Cast ==
- Jack Donovan as Jim Conway
- Alice Dahl as Mary McGuire
- Philo McCullough as Black Jack Bolivar
- Donald Keith as Louie Weinstock
- Victor Potel as Tom Watson
- Robert 'Buddy' Shaw as Tommy McGuire
- Donald Mack as Dude Malloy
- Henry Roquemore as Gilbert Henderson
- Pat Harmon as Barney McGuire
- Tom London as Sheriff James
- Adabelle Driver as Mrs. McGuire
- Lawrence Underwood as Master mechanic
