= Sidney Toler =

American actor, playwright, and theatre director (1874–1947)

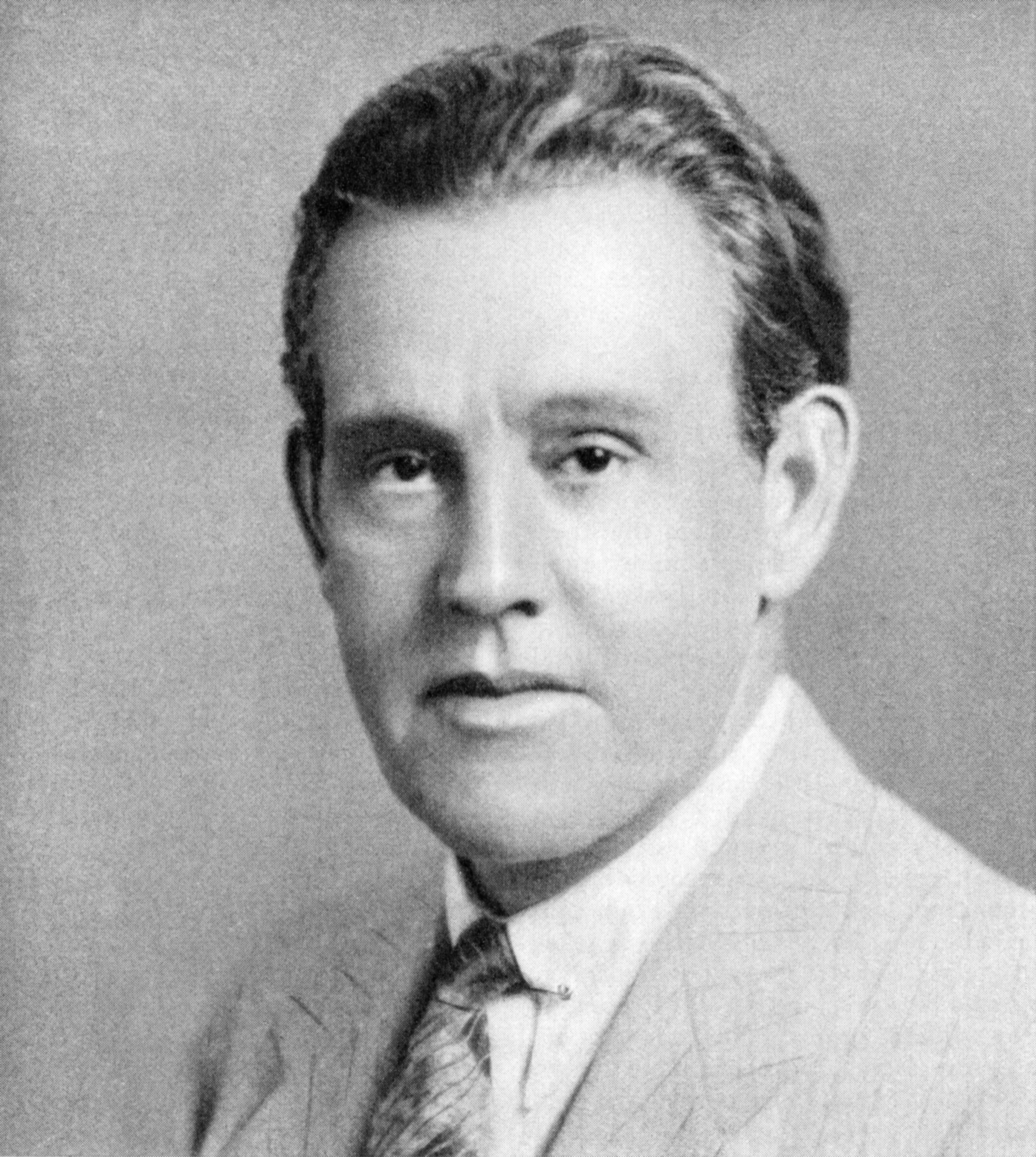
- Toler in 1930
- Born: Hooper G. Toler Jr. April 28, 1874; Warrensburg, Missouri, U.S.
- Died: February 12, 1947 (aged 72); Beverly Hills, California, U.S.
- Burial place: Highland Cemetery, Wichita, Kansas, U.S.
- Occupations: Actor; playwright; theatre director
- Years active: 1903–1946
- Known for: Charlie Chan
- Spouses: Vivian Marston (m. 1906–1943) Vera Tattersall Orkow (m. 1943–1947)

Sidney Toler (born Hooper G. Toler Jr., April 28, 1874 – February 12, 1947) was an American actor, playwright, and theatre director. The second non-Asian actor to play the role of Charlie Chan on screen, he is best remembered for his portrayal of the Chinese-American detective in 22 films made between 1938 and 1946. Before becoming Chan, Toler played supporting roles in 50 motion pictures, and was a highly regarded comic actor on the Broadway stage.

== Early life and career ==
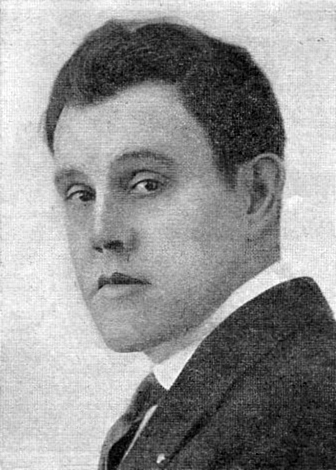
Sidney Toler in 1920

Hooper G. Toler Jr., who was called Sidney Toler from childhood, was born April 28, 1874, in Warrensburg, Missouri. The Toler family moved to Anthony, Kansas, in the 1880s, then to Wichita, Kansas. He showed an early interest in the theater, acting in an amateur production of Tom Sawyer at the age of seven. He left the University of Kansas and became a professional actor in 1892, playing the heavy in a performance of a melodrama called The Master Man in Kansas City. In 1894, he joined the Corse Payton company and toured for four years. His success in leading roles at the Lee Avenue Academy in Brooklyn brought an invitation to join the company of Julia Marlowe. He toured with her for two years, playing the Duke of Buckingham in When Knighthood Was in Flower.

In Brooklyn, Toler played leads with the Columbia Theatre Stock Company and sang baritone with the Orpheum Theatre's operatic stock company. In 1903, he made his Broadway debut in the musical comedy, The Office Boy.

Over the next nine years, Toler had his own theatre companies in Portland, Maine, and Halifax, Nova Scotia—at one point having 12 stock companies on the road. He began a prolific career as a playwright, writing The Belle of Richmond, The Dancing Master, The House on the Sands, and more than 70 other plays. One particular success was a war play called The Man They Left Behind, which was presented by 67 companies in a period of three months and by 18 different companies in a single week.

In 1921, Paramount Pictures released two films based on Toler's plays: The Bait, adapted from The Tiger Lady, and A Heart to Let, based on Agatha's Aunt, which Toler adapted from a novel by Harriet Lummis Smith. Three of his plays reached Broadway: Golden Days (1921), co-written with Marion Short, and starring Helen Hayes, The Exile (1923), and Ritzy (1930).

Toler earned fame as an actor on the Broadway stage, working for David Belasco for 14 years. He was best known for his comedy roles, from the detective-butler in On the Hiring Line (1919)—a performance that The New York Times called "one of the comedy high spots of the week"—to Cool Kelly the iceman in It's a Wise Child (1929–30).

In 1929, Toler made his first film, Madame X, and in 1931, after the Boston run of It's a Wise Child, he moved to Hollywood. He played supporting roles in films for various studios, including White Shoulders (1931), Tom Brown of Culver (1932), Blonde Venus (1932), The Phantom President (1932), Speak Easily (1932),The World Changes (1933), Spitfire (1934), Operator 13 (1934), The Call of the Wild (1935), Three Godfathers (1936), The Gorgeous Hussy (1936), Double Wedding (1937), The Mysterious Rider (1938), and Law of the Pampas (1939).

== Charlie Chan series ==
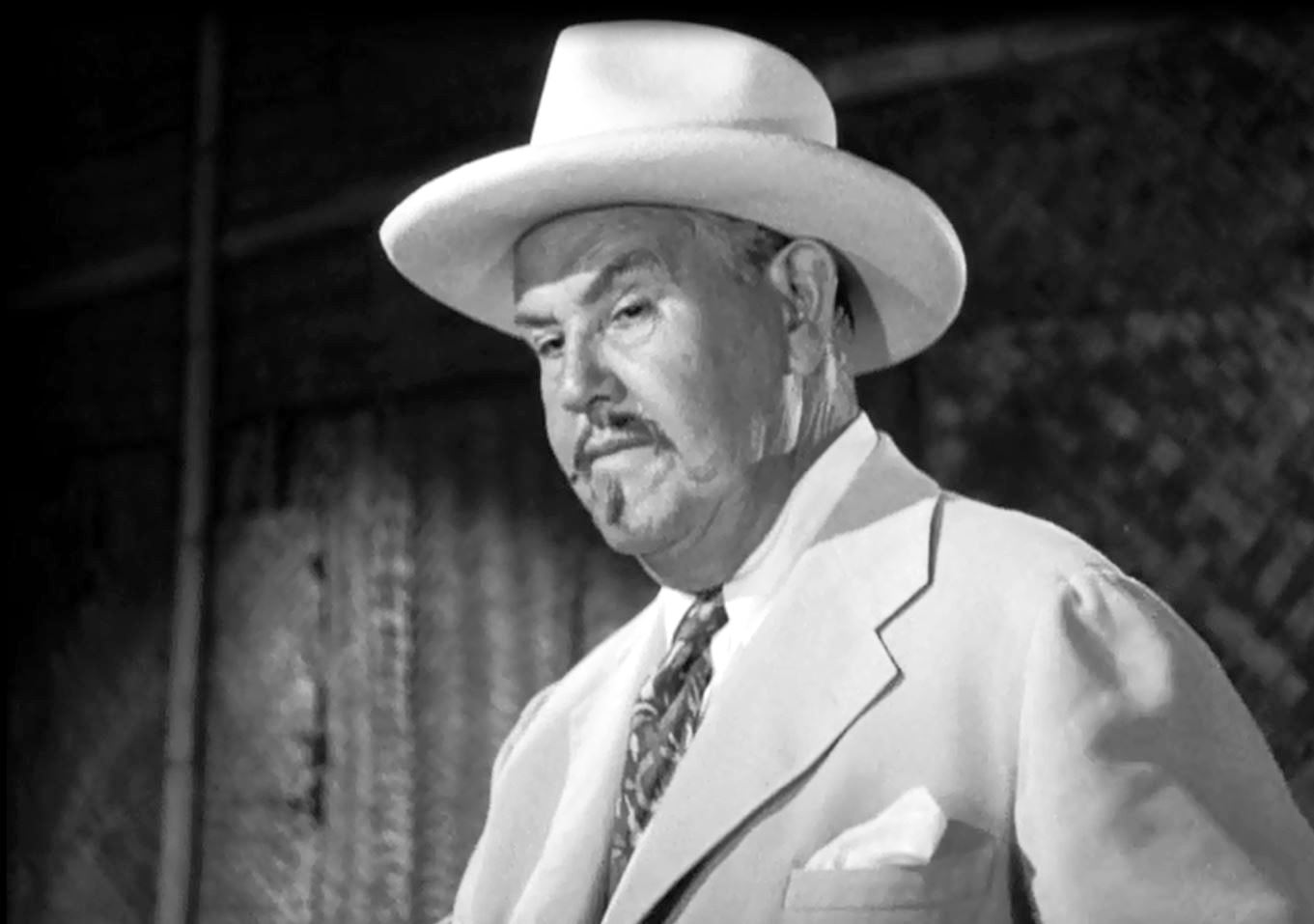
Sidney Toler as Charlie Chan in Dangerous Money (1946)

Since 1931 Twentieth Century-Fox had been producing very successful detective mysteries featuring the Oriental sleuth Charlie Chan. They became vehicles for character actor Warner Oland, who starred in these pictures until his death on August 6, 1938. The studio then began the search for a new Charlie Chan. Thirty-four actors were tested before the studio decided on Toler. Twentieth Century-Fox announced its choice on October 16, 1938, and filming began October 24 on Charlie Chan in Honolulu, which had been originally scripted for Warner Oland and Keye Luke.

Toler's interpretation of the Chinese detective in Charlie Chan in Honolulu was very well received. Box Office Digest: "Charlie Chan is in safe hands. Charlie will go marching on to cheerful tunes in the person of Sidney Toler. It isn't an imitation Warner Oland characterization that Toler delivers, but it is a thoroughly satisfying, neatly shaded Charlie Chan." Independent Exhibitors Film Bulletin: "As for Toler, he does a superlative job. He has sensibly formulated his own characterization, a lighter, more affable and less formal Charlie Chan. We think audiences will accept him." Motion Picture Herald: "[The preview was] attended by top-ranking executives, the most sought-after reviewers and commentators, and invited guests... quite a few of these strangers to Chan went into ecstasies."

Besides Toler, another change was made in the series. Now that Warner Oland was gone, Keye Luke was no longer interested in playing Number One Son Lee. Replacing him was Sen Yung as Number Two Son, Jimmy. Toler's Chan, rather than merely mimicking the character that Oland had portrayed, had a somewhat sharper edge that was well suited for the rapid changes of the times, both political and cultural. When needed, Charlie Chan now displayed overt sarcasm, usually toward his son Jimmy.

Through four years and 11 films, Toler played Charlie Chan for Twentieth Century-Fox. Unlike Warner Oland, however, Toler was still considered a featured player and never received "star" billing for his performances. Now the film title always came first, followed by "with Sidney Toler". In 1942, after the completion of Castle in the Desert, Fox concluded the series. The wartime collapse of the international film market may have been a factor, but the main reason was that Fox was curtailing virtually all of its low-budget series. Fox's other "B" series — Jane Withers, Michael Shayne, and The Cisco Kid — also ended that year. Only Laurel and Hardy remained in Fox's "B" unit, until it shut down at the end of 1944.

Sidney Toler returned to the ranks of freelance character actors, and worked in three feature films and a serial. But Charlie Chan was Toler's most successful and profitable role, and the enterprising actor tried to find a way to return Chan to the screen. He bought the screen rights to the Charlie Chan character from Eleanor Biggers Cole, the widow of Chan's creator, Earl Derr Biggers. Toler hoped that if he could find someone to produce new Charlie Chan films, starring himself, Fox would distribute them. Fox declined, having already dropped the series, but Toler sold the idea to Monogram Pictures, a lower-budget film studio. Philip N. Krasne, a Hollywood lawyer who invested in film productions, partnered with James S. Burkett to produce the Monogram Chans.

With the release of Charlie Chan in the Secret Service (1944), the effects of a more limited budget were apparent. Production values were no match for those of Fox; Monogram's budgets were typically about 40% of what Fox's had been. In fairness to Monogram, the new Toler films continued to please exhibitors and moviegoers, with The Chinese Cat, The Shanghai Cobra, and Dark Alibi often cited as favorites by fans. Cast changes were again made: Sen Yung left Hollywood to serve in the U.S. Army Air Forces during World War II, ultimately earning the rank of captain. Yung's Number Two Son Jimmy was replaced by Benson Fong as Number Three Son Tommy (and once by Number Four Son Eddie -- Edwin Luke, real-life brother of Number One Son Keye Luke). Mantan Moreland played the ever-present and popular Birmingham Brown, who brought comedy relief (and African American audiences) to the series. Monogram's Charlie Chan films were profitable and successful; they boasted tricky screenplays with many surprise culprits and murder devices, and frequent appearances by "name" character actors.

== Later years ==
After 1943 Sidney Toler was playing Charlie Chan exclusively, except for a single instance in 1945. The Fred Allen comedy It's in the Bag! cast Toler as a plainclothes detective who speaks without prepositions—like Charlie Chan.

By the end of 1946, age and illness were affecting Toler. Diagnosed with cancer, the 72-year-old Toler was so ill during the filming of Dangerous Money (1946) and Shadows Over Chinatown (1946) that he could hardly walk. Monogram hired Toler's original foil, "Number Two Son" Sen Yung (now billed as Victor Sen Young) for Toler's last three films, quite probably to ease the burden on Toler; the comic byplay of Young and Moreland relieved Toler of much of the action. According to Mantan Moreland, Toler gallantly refused to leave the series: "Mr. Toler couldn't stand for very long and had to rest a lot. I told him he should be in a hospital. And he said to me, 'Manny, if I quit the picture I'll put all these people out of work.'" Toler mustered enough strength to complete his last film, The Trap. The film was scripted and staged with Toler's fragile physical condition in mind: Toler's scenes are limited, and he doesn't make his entrance until 16 minutes into the picture. The Trap was filmed in July and August 1946, and released in November that same year to mostly negative reviews, noting the film's patchwork construction. Trade publisher Pete Harrison was blunt: "A new low for the series. The picture does not have one redeeming feature." Toler, no longer able to work in pictures, was forced into retirement. His Monogram output matched his Fox output: 11 films for each studio.

== Personal life ==
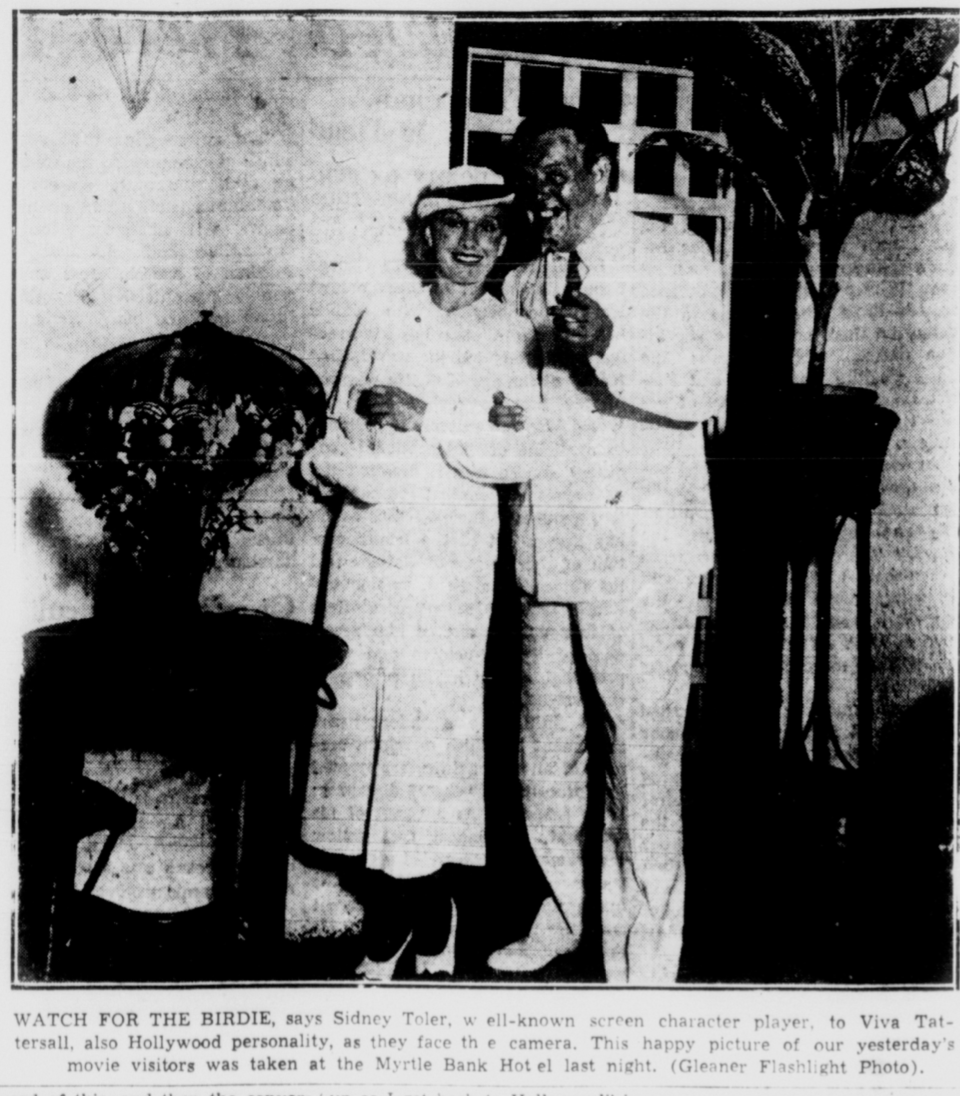
Sidney Toler and Viva Tattersall in Jamaica 1943

On August 29, 1906, Toler married actress Vivian Marston (born Josephine Gasper) of Boston, Massachusetts. She died in Hollywood on October 7, 1943, after an illness of seven months. Four weeks later, he married sculptor Vera Tattersall Orkow, a British-born actress credited as Viva Tattersall when Toler and she performed together and co-wrote the plays Dress Parade (1929) and Ritzy (1930). Their marriage lasted until Toler's death.

Sidney Toler died on February 12, 1947, at his home in Los Angeles from intestinal cancer. He is buried at Highland Cemetery, Wichita, Sedgwick County, Kansas, USA. Monogram continued the Charlie Chan series with actor Roland Winters, who appeared in six Chan features.

== Filmography ==
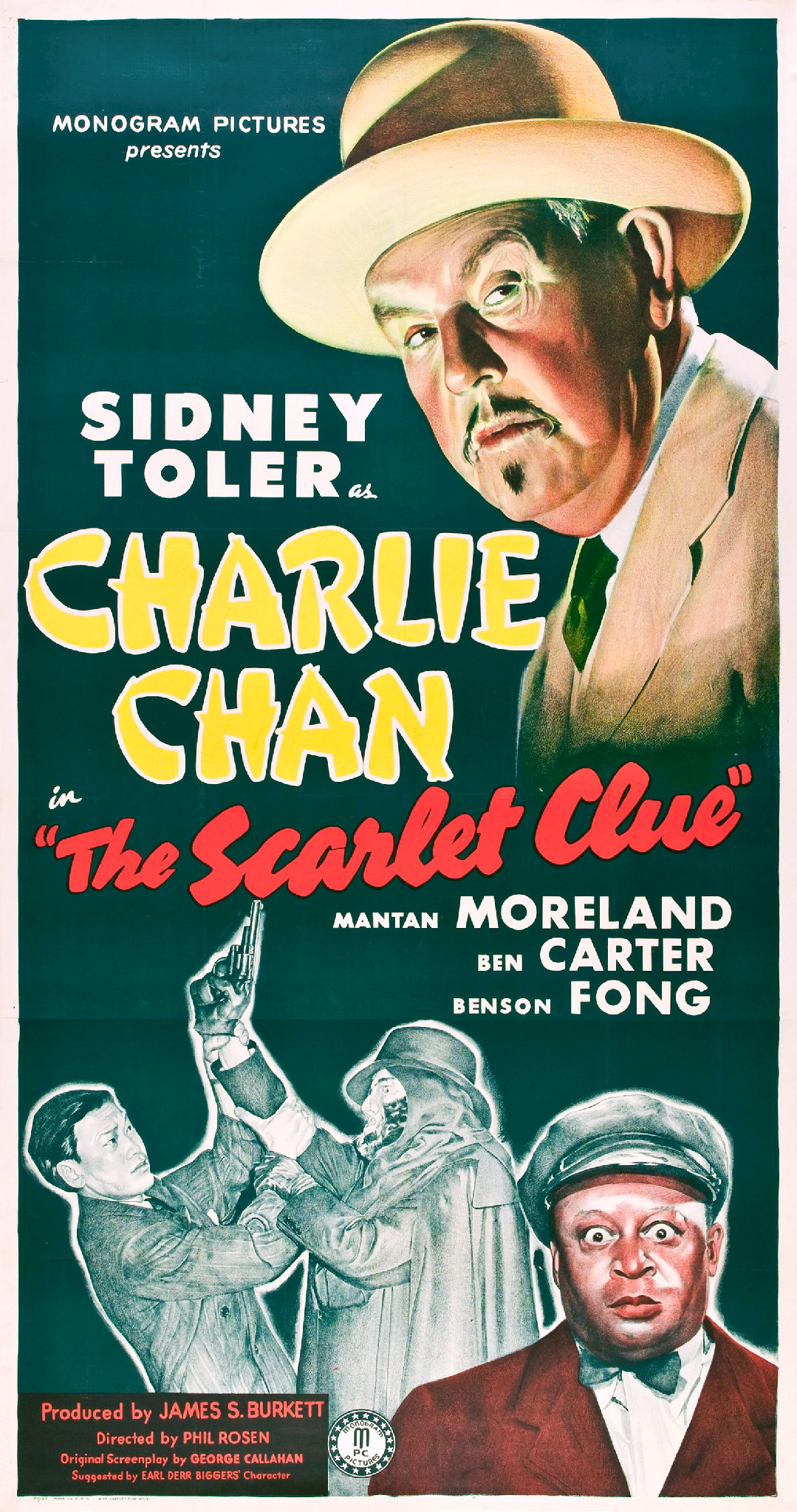
Poster for The Scarlet Clue (1945)

Year	Title	Role	Notes
1929	Madame X	Merivel	
1929	The Gay Nineties; or, The Unfaithful Husband		Vitaphone Varieties release 811
1929	In the Nick of Time		Vitaphone Varieties release 897–898
1930	The Devil's Parade		Vitaphone Varieties release 992
1931	White Shoulders	William Sothern	
1931	Strictly Dishonorable	Mulligan	
1932	Strangers in Love	Detective McPhail	
1932	Radio Patrol	Tom Koegh	
1932	Is My Face Red?	Tony Mugatti	
1932	Tom Brown of Culver	Major Wharton	
1932	Speak Easily	Stage director	
1932	Blondie of the Follies	Pete	
1932	Blonde Venus	Detective Wilson	
1932	The Phantom President	Aikenhead	
1932	Over the Counter	Mr. Drake	Short film
1932	He Learned About Women	Wilson	
1933	The Billion Dollar Scandal	Carter B. Moore	
1933	King of the Jungle	Neil Forbes	
1933	The Narrow Corner		
1933	The Way to Love	Pierre	
1933	The World Changes	Hodgens	
1934	Massacre	Thomas Shanks	
1934	Dark Hazard	John Bright	
1934	Spitfire	Jim Sawyer	
1934	Registered Nurse	Frankie Sylvestrie	
1934	The Trumpet Blows	Pepe Sancho	
1934	Upperworld	Moran	
1934	Operator 13	Major Allan Pinkerton	
1934	Here Comes the Groom	Lieutenant Detective Weaver	
1935	Romance in Manhattan	Sergeant Duffy	
1935	The Daring Young Man	Warden Palmer	
1935	Champagne for Breakfast	Judge	
1935	Orchids to You	Nick Corsini	
1935	The Call of the Wild	Joe Groggins	
1935	This Is the Life	Professor Lafcadio F. Breckenridge	
1936	Three Godfathers	Professor Snape	
1936	Give Us This Night	1st Carabiniere	
1936	The Gorgeous Hussy	Daniel Webster	
1936	Our Relations	Ship's captain	
1936	The Longest Night	Captain Holt	
1937	That Certain Woman	Detective Neely	
1937	Double Wedding	Keogh	
1938	Gold Is Where You Find It	Harrison McCooey	
1938	Wide Open Faces	Sheriff	
1938	One Wild Night	Lawton	
1938	The Mysterious Rider	Frosty Kilburn	
1938	If I Were King	Robin Turgis	
1938	Up the River	Jeffrey Mitchell	
1938	Charlie Chan in Honolulu	Charlie Chan	
1939	Disbarred	G. L. "Mardy" Mardeen	
1939	King of Chinatown	Dr. Chang Ling	
1939	The Kid from Kokomo	Judge Bronson	
1939	Charlie Chan in Reno	Charlie Chan	
1939	Heritage of the Desert	Nosey	
1939	Charlie Chan at Treasure Island	Charlie Chan	
1939	Law of the Pampas	Fernando Ramiriez	
1939	City in Darkness	Charlie Chan	
1940	Charlie Chan in Panama	Charlie Chan	
1940	Charlie Chan's Murder Cruise	Charlie Chan	
1940	Charlie Chan at the Wax Museum	Charlie Chan	
1940	Murder Over New York	Charlie Chan	
1941	Dead Men Tell	Charlie Chan	
1941	Charlie Chan in Rio	Charlie Chan	
1942	Castle in the Desert	Charlie Chan	
1942	A Night to Remember	Inspector Hankins	
1943	The Adventures of Smilin' Jack	General Kai Ling	Serial
1943	Isle of Forgotten Sins	Krogan	
1943	White Savage	Wong	
1944	Charlie Chan in the Secret Service	Charlie Chan	
1944	The Chinese Cat	Charlie Chan	
1944	Black Magic	Charlie Chan	
1945	The Jade Mask	Charlie Chan	
1945	It's in the Bag!	Detective Sully	
1945	The Scarlet Clue	Charlie Chan	
1945	The Shanghai Cobra	Charlie Chan	
1946	The Red Dragon	Charlie Chan	
1946	Dark Alibi	Charlie Chan	
1946	Shadows Over Chinatown	Charlie Chan	
1946	Dangerous Money	Charlie Chan	
1946	The Trap	Charlie Chan	(final performance)
