= The Phantom President =

1932 film

- Directed by: Norman Taurog
- Written by: Walter DeLeon; Harlan Thompson; George F. Worts (novel)
- Starring: George M. Cohan; Claudette Colbert; Jimmy Durante
- Cinematography: David Abel
- Edited by: LeRoy Stone
- Music by: Richard Rodgers; Rudolph G. Kopp (uncredited); John Leipold (uncredited)
- Production company: Paramount Pictures
- Distributed by: Paramount Pictures
- Release date: September 23, 1932
- Running time: 78 minutes
- Country: United States
- Language: English

The Phantom President is a 1932 American pre-Code musical comedy and political satire film. It was directed by Norman Taurog, starred George M. Cohan, Claudette Colbert, and Jimmy Durante, with songs by Richard Rodgers (music) and Lorenz Hart (lyrics).

According to Rodgers, Cohan deeply resented having to work with Rodgers and Hart on the film. Cohan was bitter that his type of musical theatre had gone out of fashion, supplanted by the more literate and musically sophisticated shows of Rodgers and Hart, among others. During the filming, Cohan would sarcastically refer to Rodgers and Hart as "Gilbert and Sullivan".

However, in 1937 Cohan starred in I'd Rather Be Right, a musical with songs by Rodgers and Hart. (In the Cohan biopic Yankee Doodle Dandy, the segments dealing with I'd Rather Be Right only mention librettists George S. Kaufman and Moss Hart, not Rodgers and Hart.)

== Plot ==
The Phantom President tells the fictional story of American presidential candidates, based on the novel by George F. Worts. A colorless stiff candidate for president is replaced in public appearances by a charismatic medicine show pitchman, from the day when the show included blackface makeup and eccentric dancing.

== Cast ==
- George M. Cohan as Theodore K. Blair/Peeter J. 'Doc' Varney
- Claudette Colbert as Felicia Hammond
- Jimmy Durante as Curly Cooney
- George Barbier as Boss Jim Ronkton
- Sidney Toler as Prof. Aikenhead
- Louise Mackintosh as Sen. Sarah Scranton
- Jameson Thomas as Jerrido
- Julius McVicker as Sen. Melrose
- Charles Middleton as Abraham Lincoln (uncredited)
- Alan Mowbray as George Washington (uncredited)

== Quotes ==
- Prof. Aikenhead: "Blair lacks political charm. Blair has no flair for savoir faire."
- Peeter J. 'Doc' Varney: "I'm just trying to figure out which one of us looks the most alike."
