= Castle in the Desert =

1942 film by Harry Lachman

- Directed by: Harry Lachman
- Written by: Earl Derr Biggers (characters); John Larkin
- Produced by: Ralph Dietrich
- Starring: Sidney Toler
- Cinematography: Virgil Miller
- Edited by: John Brady
- Music by: Emil Newman
- Production company: 20th Century Fox
- Distributed by: 20th Century Fox
- Release date: February 27, 1942
- Running time: 62 minutes
- Country: United States
- Language: English

Castle in the Desert is a 1942 film featuring the Chinese detective Charlie Chan. It was the eleventh film to feature Sidney Toler as the title character, and the last made by 20th Century Fox. The series continued with Toler, though under much reduced circumstances, at Monogram Pictures.

== Plot ==
Mrs. Manderley, an eccentric descendant of the Borgias, lives in a castle in the middle of the Mojave Desert with her husband Paul Manderley, a reclusive scholarly millionaire. Someone is killed after being poisoned. Paul tries to cover up the murder in which Charlie Chan investigates. In addition to Paul Manderley and his wife (who may be insane and not responsible for her actions) other suspects include:

- Walter Hartford, Paul's lawyer who wants to maintain his influence over the Manderley estate
- Madame Saturnia, a local astrologer who takes great pride in the fact that her predictions about the growing number of murder victims are always right
- Watson King, a sculptor who warns Chan to mind his own business and has a connection to the Manderleys

The clues include:

- the poison used which was stolen from a laboratory
- a forged letter sent to Charlie Chan summoning him to the Manderley Castle
- the poisoned cocktail
- a medieval crossbow

Aiding and hindering Chan's investigation is his Number Two son Jimmy, who is on leave with the U.S. Army, and decides to get involved to help his father solve the case, much to the senior Chan's annoyance.

Chan decides that there are two different conspiracies afoot, one involving two faked deaths to convince Mr. Manderley to institutionalize his wife, and "leave in sorrow", giving crooked attorney Walter Hartford control of the estate.

But when Hartford is murdered himself, Chan connects it to an attempt to poison Paul Manderley with "deadly nightshade". The original plotters needed him alive to sign the commitment papers, so Chan reasons it could not have been them. Chan decides that Mrs. Manderley's step-brother, thought deceased, has returned to the house in another identity...and unmasks and arrests him.

One problem remains...Jimmy has worn a suit of armor for protection. After being pushed down a long flight of stairs by the killer, he is trapped inside the badly bent suit.

== Cast ==
- Sidney Toler as Charlie Chan
- Arleen Whelan as Brenda Hartford
- Richard Derr as Carl Detheridge
- Douglass Dumbrille as Paul Manderley
- Henry Daniell as Watson King
- Edmund MacDonald as Walter Hartford
- Victor Sen Yung as Jimmy Chan
- Lenita Lane as Lucrezia "Lucy" Manderley
- Ethel Griffies as Lily, Mme. Saturnia
- Steven Geray as Dr. Retling
- Lucien Littlefield as Professor Gleason
- Milton Parsons as Arthur Fletcher, Private Investigator
- George Chandler as Station Wagon Driver (uncredited)
- Oliver Blake as Hotel Owner (uncredited)
