= Tom Brown of Culver =

1932 film

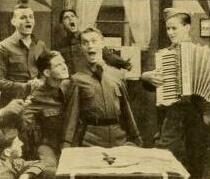
- Image of the film from a 1932 ad
- Directed by: William Wyler
- Starring: Tom Brown; H. B. Warner; Slim Summerville; Richard Cromwell; Ben Alexander; Sidney Toler; Andy Devine
- Production company: Universal
- Release date: July 1, 1932
- Country: United States
- Language: English

Tom Brown of Culver is a 1932 American pre-Code film directed by William Wyler. The film will enter the public domain in 2028 as its copyright was renewed in 1960.

== Plot ==
A young man attends Culver Military Academy. He is the only son of a deceased soldier who received the Congressional Medal of Honor.

== Cast ==
- Tom Brown as Tom Brown
- Slim Summerville as Elmer "Slim" Whitman
- Richard Cromwell as Robert Randolph III
- H. B. Warner as Doctor Brown
- Ben Alexander as Corporal John Clarke
- Andy Devine as Mac
- Russell Hopton as Legion Doctor
- Betty Blythe as Dolores Delight
- Sidney Toler as Major Wharton
- Willard Robertson as Captain White
- Norman Phillips Jr. as Ernest Carruthers
- Tyrone Power Jr. as Donald MacKenzie
- Kit Guard as K.O. Mooney
- Lew Kelly as Harry
- Matty Roubert as Cadet
