= The Bullet Mark =

1928 film

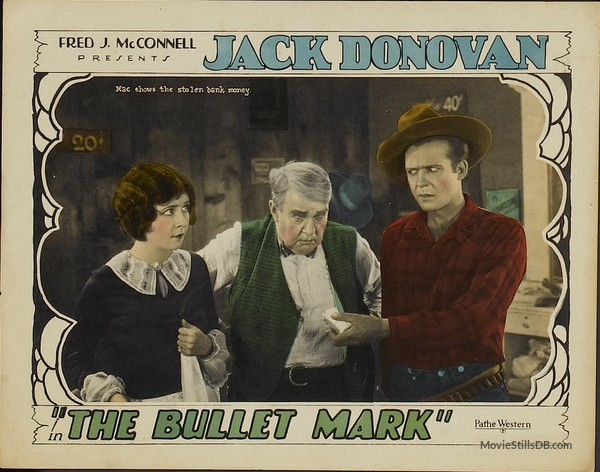
- Directed by: Stuart Paton
- Written by: Jack Kelly; Joseph Anthony Roach; Harry Wood
- Starring: Jack Donovan; Gladys McConnell; Joseph W. Girard
- Cinematography: Allen M. Davey
- Production company: Fred J. McConnell Productions
- Distributed by: Pathé Exchange
- Release date: March 25, 1928
- Country: United States
- Languages: Silent; English intertitles

The Bullet Mark is a 1928 American silent Western film directed by Stuart Paton and starring Jack Donovan, Gladys McConnell and Joseph W. Girard.

== Cast ==
- Jack Donovan
- Gladys McConnell
- Joseph W. Girard
- Albert J. Smith
- Lincoln Plumer
- Margaret Gray

== Preservation ==
With no holdings located in archives, The Bullet Mark is considered a lost film.
