= Secret Valley (film) =

1937 film by Howard Bretherton

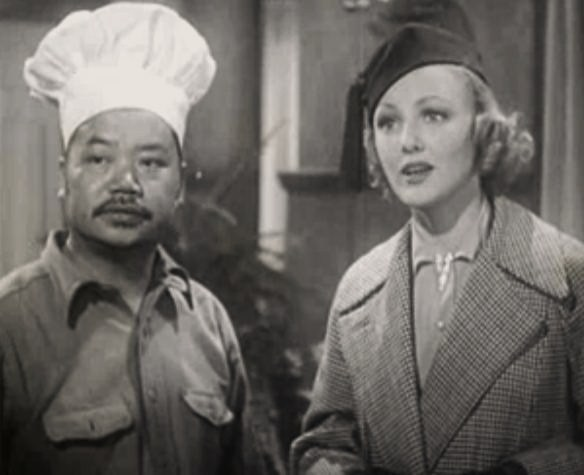
- Willie Fung and Virginia Grey in the film
- Directed by: Howard Bretherton
- Written by: Paul Franklin (adaptation); Daniel Jarrett (screenplay); Earle Snell (screenplay); Harold Bell Wright (story)
- Produced by: Sol Lesser
- Starring: See below
- Cinematography: Charles Edgar Schoenbaum
- Edited by: Charles Craft
- Distributed by: 20th Century Fox (21st Century Fox/The Walt Disney Company)
- Release date: January 15, 1937
- Running time: 60 minutes
- Country: United States
- Language: English

Secret Valley is a 1937 American Western film directed by Howard Bretherton. The film is also known as Gangster's Bride and Gangster's Valley in the United Kingdom.

== Cast ==
- Richard Arlen as Lee Rogers
- Virginia Grey as Jean Carlo
- Jack Mulhall as Russell Parker
- Norman Willis as Slick Collins aka Howard Carlo
- Syd Saylor as Paddy
- Russell Hicks as Austin Martin
- Willie Fung as Tabasco
- Maude Allen as Mrs. Hogan
