= Secret Valley (Nevada) =

Valley in USA

Coordinates: 40°51′05″N 115°13′42″W

Secret Valley is a valley in the U.S. state of Nevada.

According to tradition, Secret Valley was named for the "secret" route pioneers took through it in order to hide from Indians.
