= Milestones (1920 film) =

1920 film

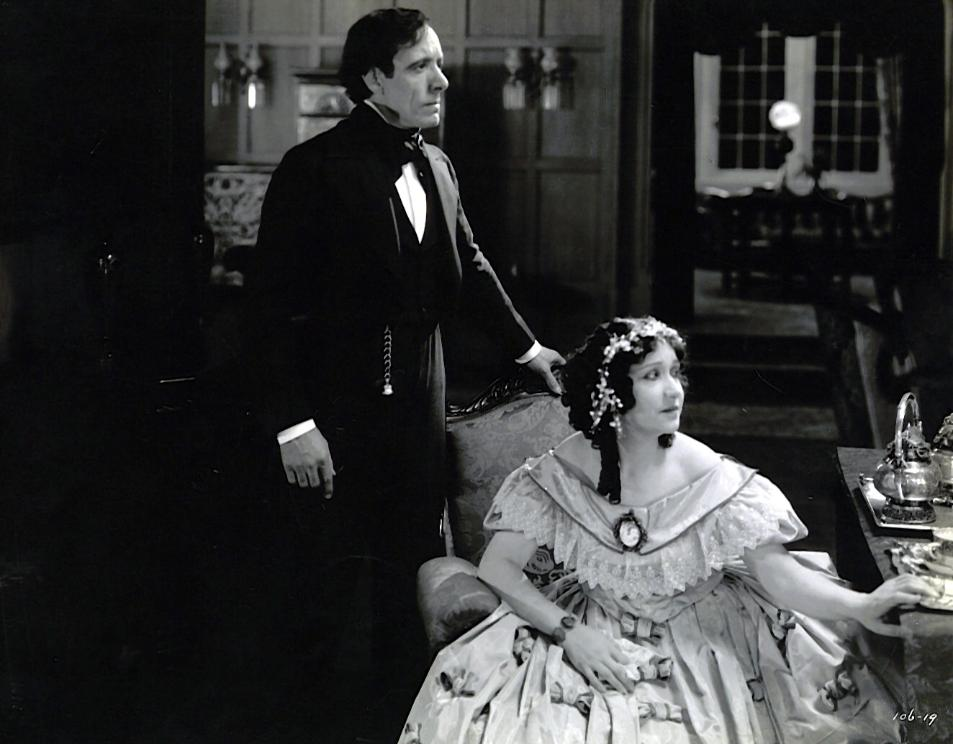
- Still from the film
- Directed by: Paul Scardon
- Written by: Louis Sherwin
- Based on: Milestones by Arnold Bennett & Edward Knoblock
- Produced by: Samuel Goldwyn
- Starring: Lewis Stone; Alice Hollister; Gertrude Robinson
- Cinematography: Otto Brautigan
- Production company: Goldwyn Pictures
- Distributed by: Goldwyn Distributing
- Release date: September 9, 1920
- Running time: 60 minutes
- Country: United States
- Language: Silent (English intertitles)

Milestones is a 1920 American silent historical drama film directed by Paul Scardon and starring Lewis Stone, Alice Hollister, and Gertrude Robinson. It is an adaptation of the 1912 West End play Milestones by Arnold Bennett and Edward Knoblock. It is a saga of a British upper-class family from the 1860s to the present.

== Cast ==
- Lewis Stone as John Rhead
- Alice Hollister as Gertrude Rhead
- Gertrude Robinson as Emily Rhead
- Harvey Clark as Sam Sibley
- Mary Alden as Rose Sibley
- May Foster as Nancy Sibley
- Boyd Irwin as Arthur Preece
- Jack Donovan as Richard Sibley Jr
- Correan Kirkham as Honorable Muriel Pym
- Carroll Fleming as Thompson
- Lionel Belmore as Richard Sibley Sr
- Gerald Pring as Ned Pym / Lord Monkhurst / Young Lord Monkhurst

== Preservation ==
With no copies of Milestones located in any film archives, it is a lost film.

== Bibliography ==
- Goble, Alan. The Complete Index to Literary Sources in Film. Walter de Gruyter, 1999.
