= Garrett Fort =

American dramatist

Garrett Elsden Fort
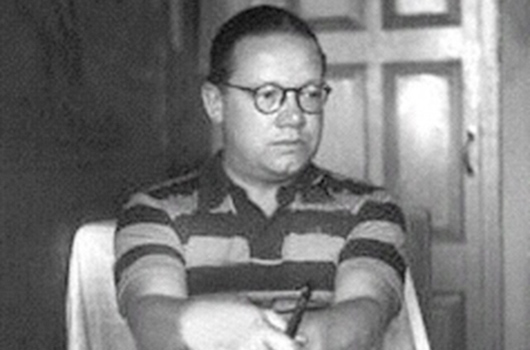
- Garrett Fort in 1937
- Born: June 5, 1900; New York City, New York, U.S.
- Died: October 26, 1945 (aged 45); Los Angeles, California, U.S.
- Occupations: Playwright, Screenwriter
- Writing career
- Genres: Drama, Horror

Garrett Elsden Fort (June 5, 1900 – October 26, 1945) was an American short story writer, playwright, and Hollywood screenwriter. He is mostly known for his connections with 1930s horror films, with film historian Gary Don Rhodes describing him as "one of, if not the pre-eminent horror film screenwriters of the classic era." He was a close follower of Meher Baba, and travelled to India while developing a screenplay based on Baba's philosophy.

== Biography ==
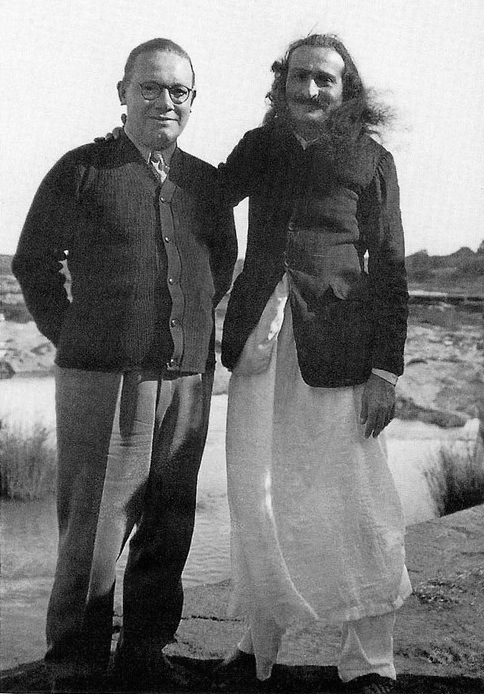
Fort in Nashik with Meher Baba (1937)

Fort was born in New York on June 5, 1900. According to Fort, he tried to make a career as an attorney in the 1920s and wrote what he described as "true confession stories as a sideline." He began working as a gateman at the Famous Players Film Company. From this position he eventually moved on as a writer under contract to Cecil B. DeMille and later at Paramount Pictures. Fort became more prominently known as a screenwriter during the early era of sound film with The Film Daily stating that he was gaining reputation as "The Edgar Wallace of the Movies" based on how he turned out adaptations and original scripts that had performed well.

Film historian Gary Don Rhodes described Fort as "one of, if not the pre-eminent horror film screenwriters of the classic era." Among the films Fort was hired to work on in the 1930s included Dracula (1931), Frankenstein (1931), Island of Lost Souls (1932), The Invisible Man (1933), Dracula's Daughter (1936), and The Devil-Doll (1936). In 1931, Fort referred to himself in an ad as "a specialist in sin and jitters." Hal Erickson also stated the Fort contributed to scripts of other non-horror film "of note", including: The Lost Patrol (1934), Panama Lady (1939), The Mark of Zorro (1940) and Blood on the Sun (1945). Erickson noted that Fort was "adept at alternating horrific highlights with bits of unexpected humor."

=== Spiritual life and demise ===
Garrett Fort became deeply interested in the spiritual path and was a devotee of Indian guru Meher Baba whom he met in Hollywood in 1934. He worked with Mercedes de Acosta to develop a screenplay based on Baba's philosophy. Fort eventually traveled to India in 1937 to continue the screenplay. However, he became depressed and returned to America. Upon returning he found it difficult to find profitable work and died penniless in a Hollywood hotel room on October 26, 1945, of an overdose of Nembutal. Fort remained in contact with Meher Baba until the end of his life and was included in Meher Baba's list of deceased male followers that Baba had a disciple read out to him in 1967.

== Selected filmography ==
- Five Days to Live (1922)
- Gay and Devilish (1922)
- In Fast Company (1924)
- On Time (1924) with Richard Talmadge, Billie Dove, Stuart Holmes
- The Fire Patrol (1924) with Anna Q. Nilsson, Madge Bellamy and Helen Jerome Eddy
- The Midnight Girl (1925) with Lila Lee and Bela Lugosi
- Made for Love (1926) with Leatrice Joy and Edmund Burns
- The Prince of Headwaiters (1927)
- Applause (1929) with Helen Morgan
- The Lady Lies (1929) with Walter Huston and Claudette Colbert
- The Letter (1929) with Jeanne Eagels
- Jealousy (1929) with Jeanne Eagels
- Outside the Law (1930) with Edward G. Robinson
- Dracula (1931) with Bela Lugosi and Edward Van Sloan
- Frankenstein (1931) with Boris Karloff and Colin Clive
- The Lost Patrol (1934) with Victor McLaglen and Boris Karloff
- Dracula's Daughter (1936) with Gloria Holden and Edward Van Sloan
- The Devil-Doll (1936) with Lionel Barrymore and Maureen O'Sullivan
- Panama Lady (1939) with Lucille Ball and Evelyn Brent
- Twelve Crowded Hours (1939) with Richard Dix and Lucille Ball
- The Mark of Zorro (1940) with Tyrone Power and Basil Rathbone
- Among the Living (1941) with Susan Hayward and Frances Farmer
- Ladies in Retirement (1941) with Ida Lupino and Louis Hayward
- Street of Chance (1942) with Claire Trevor and Louise Platt
- Blood on the Sun (1945) with James Cagney and Sylvia Sidney
