= Stephen Goosson =

American art director (1889–1973)

- Born: March 24, 1889; Grand Rapids, Michigan
- Died: March 25, 1973 (aged 84); Woodland Hills, California
- Occupation: Set designer
- Years active: 1920-1955

Stephen Goosson (March 24, 1889 - March 25, 1973) was an American film set designer and art director.

== Life ==
Born in Grand Rapids, Michigan, Goosson studied architecture at Syracuse University. He worked as an architect in Detroit before moving to New York City in 1917 and studied at the Ecole des Beaux Arts of Paris. He started his film career as art director for producer Lewis J. Selznick in 1919, and films for Fox Film Corporation such as New Movietone Follies of 1930. Gossoon made a name for himself working for Mary Pickford in 1921 when he invented new methods and materials for her film Little Lord Fauntleroy. He eventually was hired by Columbia Pictures in 1931, where he served as supervising art director for 25 years.

Goosson was the principal designed for many of Frank Capra's movies during Capra's time at Columbia in the 1930s, including American Madness, It Happened One Night, and You Can't Take It with You. Besides his collaboration with Capra, Goosson's most important film of the 1930s was the screwball comedy The Awful Truth.

== Career ==
Goosson was nominated for an Academy Award for the El Brendel musical Just Imagine and eventually won the Academy Award for Best Art Direction for Lost Horizon. His designs for the film have been noted as excellent examples of the Streamline Moderne style that reached the height of its popularity that year. Additional credits include Mr. Deeds Goes to Town, Theodora Goes Wild, The Awful Truth, Holiday, Meet John Doe, The Little Foxes, and The Jolson Story. In 1937, he was elected the first president of the Society of Motion Picture Art Directors, the forerunner of the Art Directors Guild, and was elected for a second term in 1947; he was inducted into the Art Directors Guild Hall of Fame in 2007.

In the late 1940s, he created the designs for three significant film noirs: Gilda (1946), Dead Reckoning (1947), and The Lady from Shanghai (1948).

Goosson died of a stroke in Woodland Hills, California.

== Selected filmography ==
- The Hunchback of Notre Dame (1923)
- A Blonde for a Night (1928)
- Let 'Er Go Gallegher (1928)
- Just Imagine (1930)
- Shanghaied Love (1931)
- You May Be Next (1936)
- Lost Horizon (1937)
- The Awful Truth (1937)
- Women of Glamour (1937)
- She Married an Artist (1937)
- Murder in Greenwich Village (1937)
- Squadron of Honor (1938)
- Kiss and Tell (1945)

== See also ==
- Art Directors Guild Hall of Fame
