= Wachner =

Wachner is a surname. Notable people with the surname include:

- Abraham Wachner (1892–1950), Mayor of Invercargill from 1942 to 1950
- Julian Wachner (born 1969), American composer, conductor and keyboardist
- Linda J. Wachner (born 1946), American businesswoman
- Sophie Wachner (1879–1960), American costumer
