= Cock of the Air =

1932 film

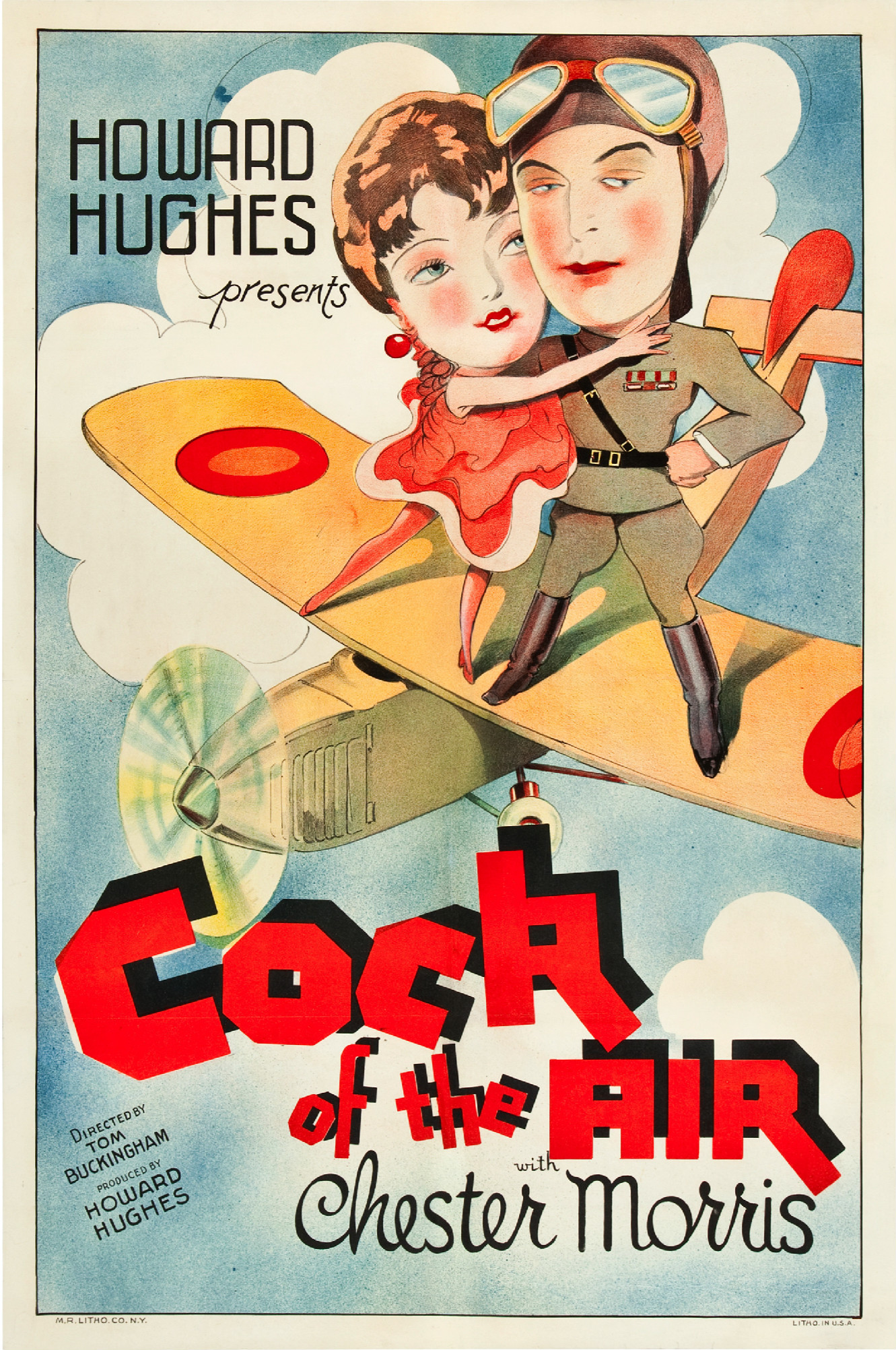
- Theatrical release poster
- Directed by: Tom Buckingham
- Screenplay by: Charles Lederer; Robert E. Sherwood
- Produced by: Howard Hughes
- Starring: Chester Morris; Billie Dove; Matt Moore; Walter Catlett; Luis Alberni
- Cinematography: Lucien N. Andriot
- Edited by: W. Duncan Mansfield
- Music by: Alfred Newman
- Production company: The Caddo Company
- Distributed by: United Artists
- Release date: January 23, 1932
- Running time: 80 minutes
- Country: United States
- Language: English
- Budget: $600,000

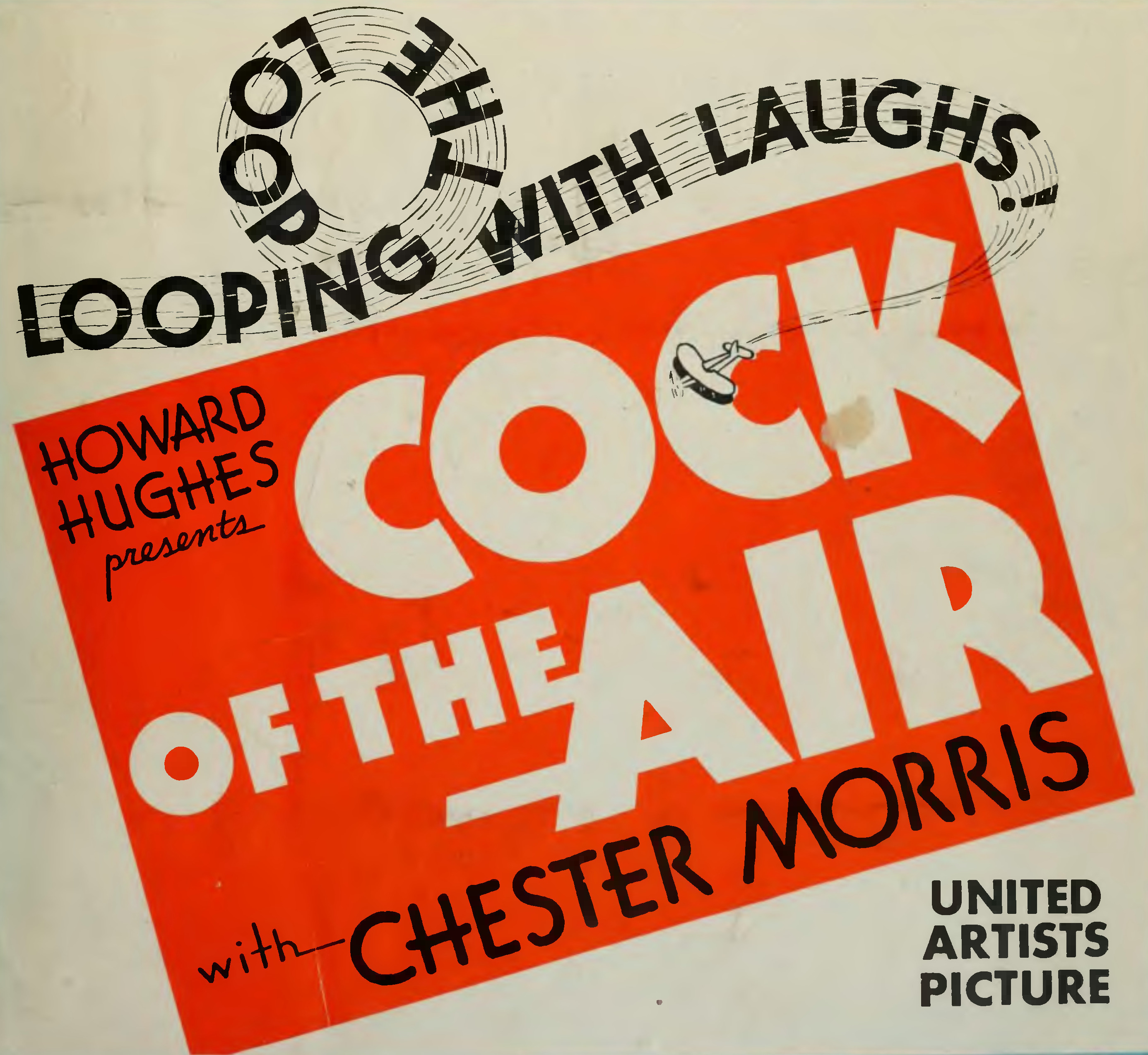
"Cock of the Air" ad from The Film Daily, 1932

Cock of the Air is a 1932 American pre-Code aviation comedy film directed by Tom Buckingham and written by Charles Lederer and Robert E. Sherwood. The film stars Chester Morris, Billie Dove, Matt Moore, Walter Catlett and Luis Alberni. Cock of the Air was released on January 23, 1932, by United Artists.

The film was restored by the Academy Film Archive in 2016.

== Plot ==
Parisian cabaret performer Lilli de Rousseau, performing as Jean d'Arc on stage, is asked to leave the country by several diplomats as she is a distraction to high-ranking officers. She is set up with a villa in Italy, and Captain Tonnino as her guardian. Lilli is also smitten by Lieutenant Roger Craig who has a reputation as a "Don Juan". She keeps her identity a secret from Roger, and begins to woo him, but remains elusive.

When her understudy in Paris begins getting accolades, Lilli presses Roger to take her there for a drink at the Ritz, although she has been forbidden to return. Roger risks arrest and his military career to fly her and his mechanic, Terry, to Paris. After a night on the town, Roger is afraid he will be picked up by the MPs, as he is absent without leave.

Terry is arrested for disorderly conduct and impersonating an officer, but is released and learns that the MPS will also drop charges against Roger. Lilli performs again as Jean d'Arc and tells Roger to join her at the theater. After she receives an ovation, she admits she promised to return to Italy in exchange for keeping Roger out of jail, and accepts Roger's marriage proposal.

== Cast ==
- Chester Morris as Lt. Roger Craig
- Billie Dove as Lilli de Rosseau
- Matt Moore as Terry
- Walter Catlett as Colonel Wallace
- Luis Alberni as Captain Tonnino
- Kathryn Sergava as Italian girl #1
- Yola d'Avril as Italian girl #2
- Vivien Oakland as Irate Woman in Restaurant
- Émile Chautard as French Ambassador
- Ethel Kenyon as Lilli's Companion
- Peggy Watts as Lilli's Maid

== Production ==
Principal photography for Cock of the Air took place first from mid-September to early October 1931. The primary location for the production was the Metropolitan Airport in Van Nuys, California where the remaining aircraft from the earlier Hell's Angels (1930), a total of 14 World War I-era and later aircraft, were assembled.

In order to recoup some of the investment made in Hell's Angels, Howard Hughes decided to recycle some of the sequences and unused footage for a pair of comedies set in the air, Sky Devils (1932) and the Cock of the Air. "The picture contained little air action ..." (Note: Other productions ended up using the vast amount of footage left over from Hell's Angels.)

During production, Hughes and his chief pilot, Frank Clarke were at odds over Clarke's romantic involvement on the set with Billie Dove, a former flame of Hughes. The resulting friction between Hughes and Clarke, and later all the pilots in the film, led to the formation of Association of Motion Picture Pilots Union that campaigned for improved working conditions.

Final release of the film was held up with re-editing scenes to comply with violations of the Motion Picture Production Code. Ultimately, changes were made, although the suggestive title was left intact.

== Critical reception ==
Reviewer Mordaunt Hall at The New York Times, described the film as "This wild tale springs from the pens of Robert E. Sherwood and Charles Lederer, with some jabs of fun inserted by Tom Buckingham, the director. Howard Hughes, producer of "Hell's Angels," is chiefly responsible for the offering, which stirred up many a hearty laugh from an audience yesterday afternoon. There was a loud outburst of mirth when Craig, played by Chester Morris, squirts a seltzer syphon at Lilli, impersonated by Billie Dove. A second or so later further merriment was elicited when Lilli slaps Craig's face with a most convenient pancake. Assuredly it is a film which conveys surprises, for the unexpected invariably happens."

Variety wrote that the film was a "disappointment", despite the money spent on "production [and] sets", which did not make up for the shortfalls in the story. The reviewer stated that censors had objected to some of the content, resulting in "800 feet" of film being removed, and "Apparently what went out put laughs and punch into the film."

Harrison's Reports described the film as "a fair comedy" whose humor was "rowdyish and occasionally vulgar." It said that there was "little to the story" with much of the humor coming from a "situation similar to that in Private Lives in which the lovers engage in a terrific battle. But this one is not so amusing."The Film Daily reviewed it as a "slim and unconvincing story that misses as an attempt at light farce comedy."

More recently, a review in the TV Guide noted: "Pleasant romantic comedy that uses its nationality-bonding thematics in a heartfelt way. Dove, who had had a brief affair with millionaire producer Hughes –he had even paid for her divorce from director Irving Willat in 1931 – was rewarded for her affections with a lead in this film.
