= Monte Carlo Nights =

1934 film by William Nigh

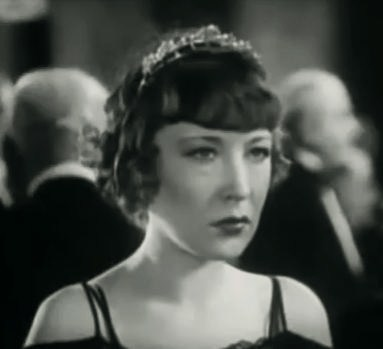
- Yola d'Avril in the film
- Directed by: William Nigh
- Written by: E. Phillips Oppenheim (story "Numbers of Death"); Norman Houston (screenplay)
- Produced by: Paul Malvern (producer)
- Starring: See below
- Cinematography: Archie Stout
- Edited by: Carl Pierson
- Production company: Monogram Pictures
- Release date: May 20, 1934
- Running time: 62 minutes
- Country: United States
- Language: English

Monte Carlo Nights is a 1934 American pre-Code film directed by William Nigh.

== Plot ==
A man wrongfully convicted of murder escapes custody and goes in search of the real killer. The problem is that he only has one clue to go on.

== Cast ==
- Mary Brian as Mary Vernon
- John Darrow as Larry Sturgis
- Yola d'Avril as Madelon
- Astrid Allwyn as Blondie Roberts
- George "Gabby" Hayes as Inspector Nick Gunby
- Kate Campbell as Aunt Emma
- Robert Frazer as Jim Daggett
- Carl Stockdale as Brandon
- George Cleveland as Croupier
