= Sky Devils =

1932 American film

- Theatrical film poster
- Directed by: Edward Sutherland; Busby Berkeley
- Written by: Joseph Moncure March; Edward Sutherland; Robert Benchley
- Produced by: Howard Hughes
- Starring: Spencer Tracy; Ann Dvorak
- Cinematography: Gaetano Gaudio
- Edited by: Douglas Biggs
- Music by: Alfred Newman
- Production company: The Caddo Co.
- Distributed by: United Artists
- Release date: February 16, 1932
- Running time: 89-90 minutes
- Country: United States
- Language: English

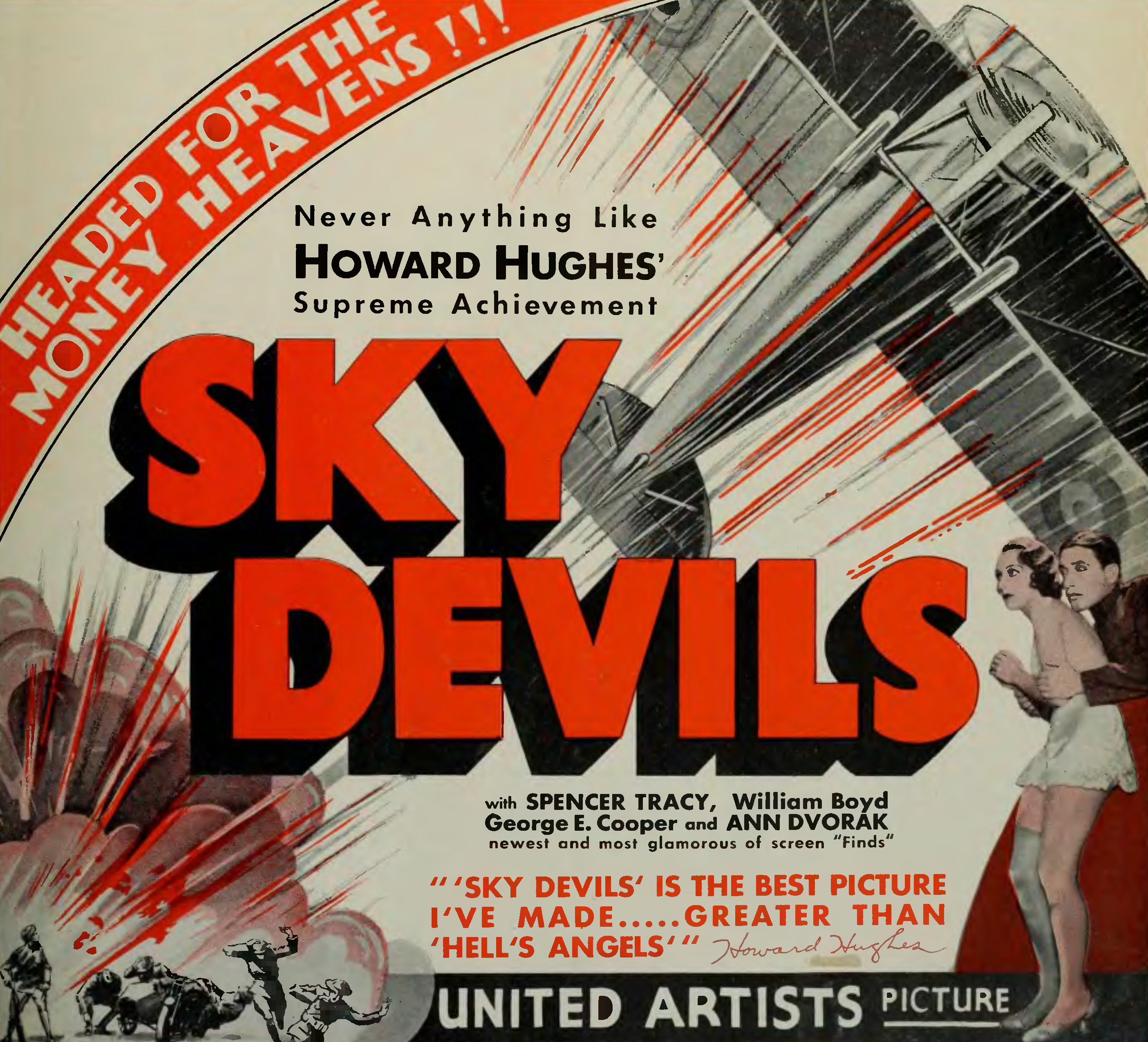
Sky Devils ad in The Film Daily, 1932

Sky Devils, also known as Ground Hogs, is a 1932 American Pre-Code aviation comedy film starring Spencer Tracy as a draft dodger who blunders into a war zone.

Sky Devils was partly written by humorist Robert Benchley and the picture's director, A. Edward Sutherland, from a story by Sutherland. The film features Ann Dvorak in a supporting role.

== Plot ==
In 1917, lifeguards Wilkie and Mitchell, who cannot swim, are trying to keep out of the war. When a man is drowning, U.S. Army Air Corps Sergeant Hogan rescues the drowning man, but they are quick to claim credit.

When the pair goes to a Red Cross benefit boxing match, they again encounter the sergeant, billed as "One Punch" Hogan, but Wilkie surprisingly knocks him out before sneaking out with Mitchell as a crowd gathers. The two friends swear that they will never join the Army, but relent and later wind up in uniform, shoveling manure. Determined to find a way out, Wilkie and Mitchell desert, and head to South America, hopping in a manure truck that is leaving the base.

After stowing away on a ship, they find out that they are on a troop ship with Army Air Corps pilots going to France. Wilkie and Mitchell pretend that they want to fly, and are sent to train at an American aviation field. Doing their best to not become pilots, while on guard duty, Wilkie competes with Sgt. Hogan for the attentions of Fifi, a French performer. After a dust-up at a nightclub, the two rivals make a quick exit, hiding in a car driven by Mary Way. Startled by the men, she crashes, but all are unharmed. Wilkie and Hogan escort her to an inn for the evening. In the morning, Wilkie has breakfast with Mary, and cons Hogan into fixing her car.

Military police looking for the two deserters come to arrest them, as well as Mary, thought to be a spy. Wilkie, Hogan and Mary escape in an aircraft, but land in enemy territory and are captured. Accidentally releasing two bombs, they bomb a German munitions depot. The Air Corps colonel sends a squadron to rescue the trio, with Mitchell scaring the Germans by his inept maneuvers.

After their rescue, the three heroes fly home, but Wilkie again accidentally pulls the lever for the bomb release, this time bombing his own base.

== Cast ==
- Spencer Tracy as Wilkie
- William Boyd as Sgt Hogan
- George Cooper as Mitchell
- Ann Dvorak as Mary Way
- Billy Bevan as the Colonel
- Yola d'Avril as Fifi
- Forrester Harvey as Innkeeper
- William B. Davidson as Captain
- Jerry Miley as Lieutenant

== Production ==
=== Filming ===
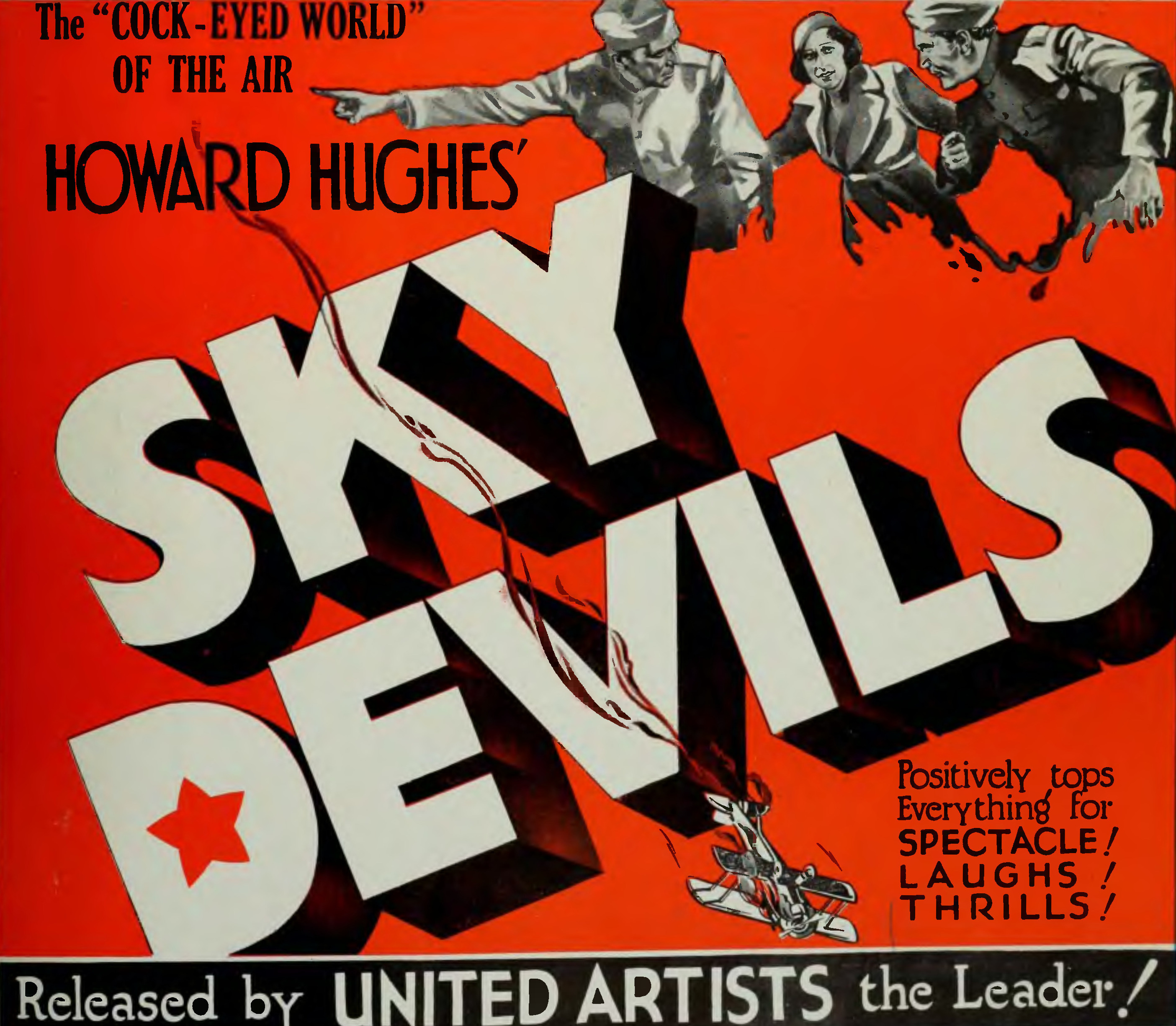
Sky Devils ad, The Film Daily, 1932

Principal photography for Sky Devils first took place from May 9 to June 12, 1931, with additional sequences shot from September 2 to early October 1931. The locations for the production included U.S. Army Air Corps March Field, San Pedro and Venice, California, along with Yuma, Arizona.

In order to recoup some of the investment made in Hell's Angels, Howard Hughes decided to recycle some of the sequences and unused footage for a pair of comedies set in the air, Cock of the Air and the Sky Devils. "The picture contained parts of the dogfight and ammunition bombing sequences..." (Note: Other productions ended up using the vast amount of footage left over from Hell's Angels.) The remaining aircraft from the earlier films, a total of 14 World War I-era aircraft, were assembled at the Metropolitan Airport in Van Nuys, California.

== Reception ==
Mordaunt Hall of The New York Times described the film as "a boisterous affair, in which even the familiar mud-hole in the water is employed to arouse laughter. Yet, Mr. Boyd as Sergeant Hogan and Mr. Tracy as Private Wilkie attack their rôles with undeniable vigor. Many punches are exchanged and when that sort of thing gets tame a few bottles and glasses are broken, which is followed by automobile smash-ups and airplane crashes. Added to this there is the quasi-romantic side of the adventure, with Yola d'Avril and Ann Dvorak contributing their feminine wiles."

Aviation film historians Hardwick and Schnepf, however, noted that Sky Devils was an example in which "Howard Hughes figured he had made such a score with 'Hell's Angels', he'd try it again with much of the same aerial footage and new stars. It bombed."
