= Hot for Paris =

1929 film

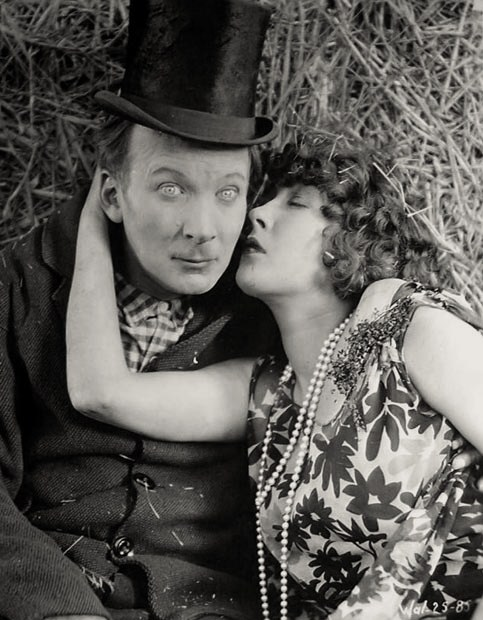
- Film still with El Brendel and Yola d'Avril
- Directed by: Raoul Walsh
- Written by: Raoul Walsh (book); Charles J. McGuirk (screenplay); William K. Wells (screenplay)
- Starring: Victor McLaglen; Fifi D'Orsay; El Brendel
- Cinematography: Charles Van Enger
- Edited by: Jack Dennis
- Production company: Fox Film Corporation
- Distributed by: Fox Film Corporation
- Release date: December 22, 1929
- Running time: 71 minutes
- Country: United States
- Language: English

Hot for Paris is a 1929 American sound (All-Talking) pre-Code black-and-white romantic adventure musical film directed by Raoul Walsh. This film is believed to be lost. The film is also known as Fifì dimmi di sì in Italy and Un marido afortunado in Spain. The film length (metres) is 1710.84 m in the silent version and 2002.54 m (7 reels) in the sound version.

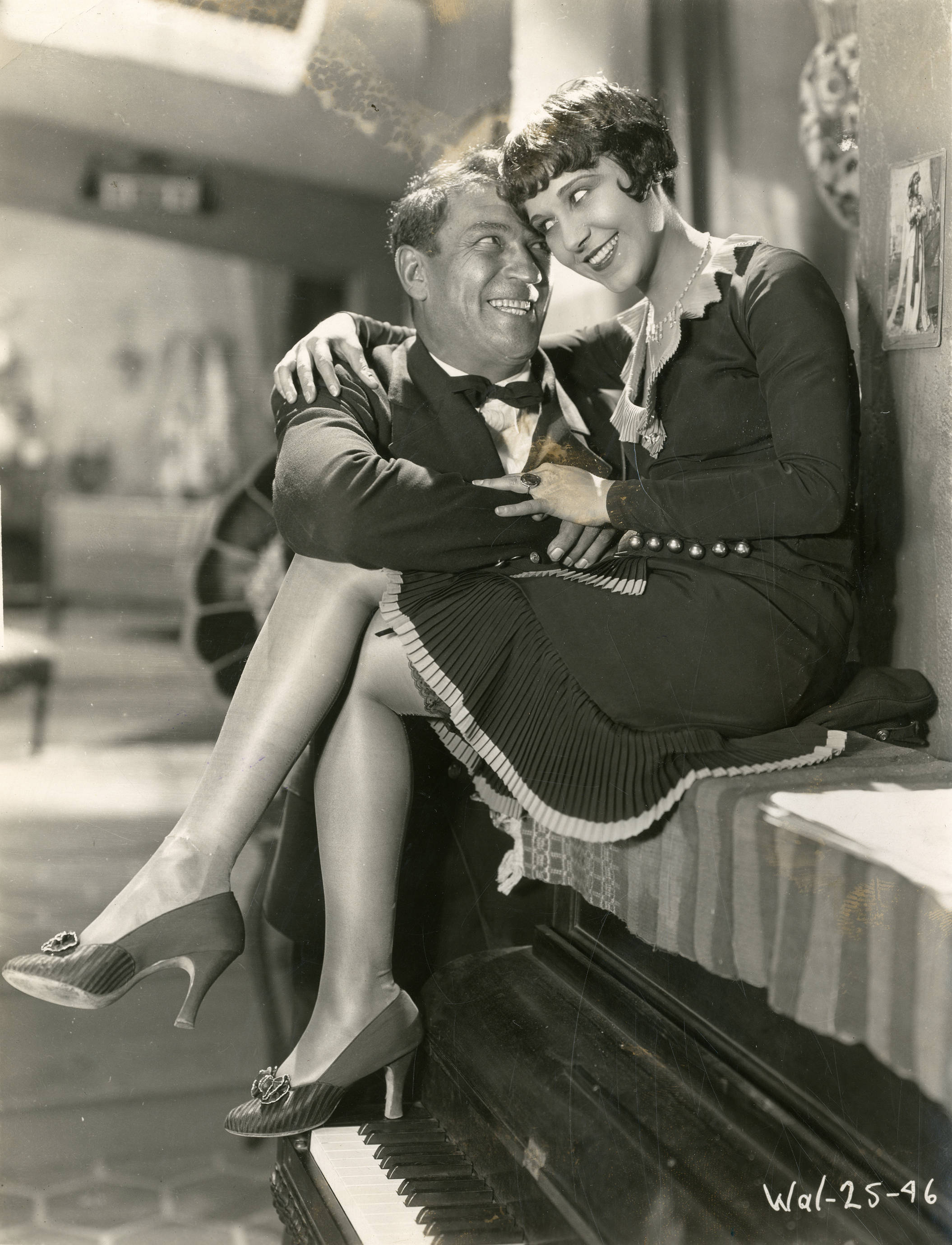
Scene from Hot for Paris

== Plot ==
John Patrick Duke, a burly, hard-drinking Irish sailor with a weakness for brawls and barrooms, has unwittingly become the talk of the London financial district. Against all odds, a ticket he placed on a long-shot horse has come through, netting him the staggering sum of £200,000. In a bustling brokerage office, clerks gasp at the news while the pompous, harried Mr. Pratt is summoned and sternly ordered to locate Duke at once and deliver the winnings before rumor, rivals, or hangers-on complicate the situation. But Duke himself is oblivious. Across the Channel, at the French port of Havre, he is already preparing to ship out with his fellow sailors. At his side is his loyal if comically inept shipmate, the lanky Swede Axel Olson, whose fractured English and bumbling antics provide a constant source of amusement and exasperation.

Pratt arrives at the waterfront under cover of darkness, valise in hand, asking passers-by if they have seen John Patrick Duke. When Duke overhears his name being spoken, his instincts lead him astray. Certain that Pratt must be a police detective sent to arrest him for his disorderly escapades during his last shore leave in Paris—broken café furniture, shattered bottles, and a dented gendarme’s helmet—Duke takes no chances. With startling agility for a man of his size, he scrambles over crates, ducks beneath gangways, and vanishes among coils of hawser and shadowed barrels.

In the midst of this frantic search for a hiding place, Duke stumbles upon a very different drama. On a dimly lit gangplank, Fifi Dupre, a vivacious Parisian beauty, is struggling to free herself from the unwelcome advances of Raoul, a bullying suitor. Duke barrels into the fray, scattering Raoul’s companions with his fists and sending Raoul reeling into the night. Fifi, shaken but unbowed, offers a breathless smile of thanks. Duke, thunderstruck by her charm, is instantly smitten. She departs arm-in-arm with her younger sister Babette, but not before tossing him a glance that lingers in his imagination.

Babette is slated to marry the foppish Charlot, an arrangement her family considers respectable, but her own feelings are uncertain. Axel, with his fractured French, heartfelt compliments, and slapstick earnestness—tripping over chairs, rescuing a runaway hat, apologizing profusely—manages to intrigue her. What begins as awkward comedy ripens into genuine affection.

The Dupre household adds further color. Papa Dupre, Mama Dupre, and Babette all watch Fifi’s budding interest in the sailor with suspicion. To them, Duke is too rough, too transient, too foreign. Yet his blustering sincerity, and his obvious devotion to Fifi, gradually win their grudging acceptance.

At Polly’s café, run with a combination of iron rolling pin and sentimental heart by Polly, the threads of romance intertwine. Fifi and Duke reunite on the dance floor, their chemistry undeniable. Axel stammers through declarations of love to Babette, who seems increasingly willing to abandon her arranged match. The café rings with music, laughter, and comic misunderstandings—until Pratt arrives once more. Spotting Duke, Pratt calls out his full name. Convinced the law has finally caught up with him, Duke bolts through the kitchen, dragging Axel along. Pratt, sputtering, explains to anyone who will listen that he is trying to give the man a fortune, not clap him in irons. No one believes him.

The Gouset household prepares for Charlot’s wedding to Babette. Ribbons are hung, relatives arrive, and Papa Gouset boasts of the alliance. But when the moment comes for the bride to appear, Babette is missing. Panic erupts: Babette fans himself in despair, Mama wails, and Papa storms about in a fury. Raoul smirks at the unfolding scandal. Search parties scatter through the town, cafés, and gardens.

Babette is finally found in the park, sitting with Axel. Far from scandal, they are deep in earnest conversation. With unusual firmness, Babette declares she will not marry Charlot, for she has given her heart to Axel. The family gasps, Charlot faints—and Papa Gouset nearly explodes. Yet Axel’s open sincerity and Babette’s resolve soften resistance, and the match is, however reluctantly, accepted.

As the uproar begins to calm, Pratt staggers into the house once more, briefcase clutched to his chest. At last he corners Duke and blurts out the truth: he is not a policeman but a messenger of good fortune. John Patrick Duke is a rich man. Producing documents and a banker’s draft, Pratt convinces him, to the astonishment of all present, that the long-shot ticket has changed his life. Raoul, refusing to concede, sneers that Fifi was never serious. But Fifi silences him: she loves Duke, money or none, and will not be swayed.

With secrets revealed and obstacles overcome, both couples are free to claim their happiness. Duke and Fifi embrace, while Axel and Babette announce their intention to marry. Polly pops champagne, Papa Gouset relents, and Mama Dupre dabs at her eyes. Babette begins to flirt mischievously with the Ship’s Cook. Pratt, finally rid of his burden, offers a wry toast to “Parisian fortunes and Irish hearts.”

The film closes in jubilant farce and romance: the rough sailor turned wealthy suitor, his comic Swedish sidekick transformed by love, and two Parisian sisters swept into a double celebration of music, dancing, and laughter. As the band strikes up and the couples kiss, the screen fades out on a joyous Parisian night.

== Cast ==
- Victor McLaglen as John Patrick Duke
- Fifi D'Orsay as Fifi Dupre
- El Brendel as Axel Olson
- Polly Moran as Polly
- Lennox Pawle as Mr. Pratt
- August Tollaire as Papa Gouset
- George Fawcett as Chop Captain
- Charles Judels as Charlot Gouset
- Edward Dillon as Ship's Cook (credited as Eddie Dillon)
- Rosita Marstini as Fifi's Mother
- Agostino Borgato as Fifi's Father
- Yola d'Avril as Babette Dupre

== Soundtrack ==
The film had the following songs:

- "Duke of Ka-ki-ak"

Music by Walter Donaldson
Lyrics by Edgar Leslie
Sung by Victor McLaglen

- "Sweet Nothings of Love"

Music by Walter Donaldson
Lyrics by Edgar Leslie
Sung by Fifi D'Orsay

- "If You Want to See Paree"

Music by Walter Donaldson
Lyrics by Edgar Leslie
Sung by Fifi D'Orsay

- "Sing Your Little Folk Song"

Music by Walter Donaldson
Lyrics by Edgar Leslie
Sung by Fifi D'Orsay

- "Cuckoo Song"

Music by Walter Donaldson
Lyrics by Edgar Leslie
Sung by El Brendel

== See also ==
- List of early sound feature films (1926–1929)
