= Yola d'Avril =

French-American actress (1906–1984)

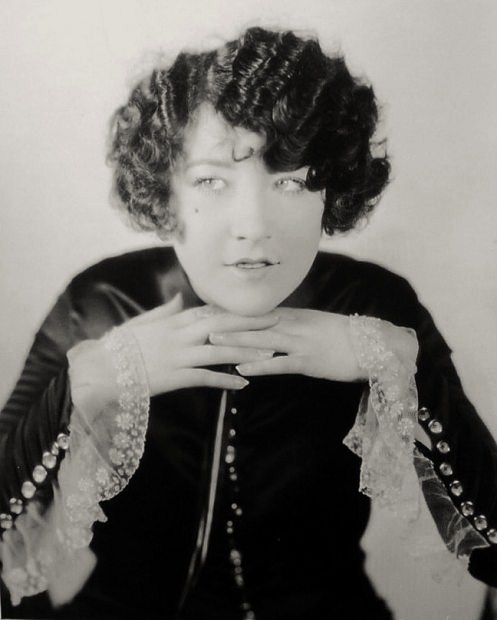
- d'Avril in 1925
- Born: 8 April 1906; Lille, France
- Died: 2 March 1984 (aged 77); Port Hueneme, California, U.S.
- Other names: Yola Vermairion
- Occupation: Actress
- Years active: 1925–1953
- Spouses: Edward Ward (m. 1930; div. 1941) Josef Montiague (m. 1948)

Yola d'Avril (8 April 1906 – 2 March 1984) was a French-American actress, who appeared in numerous productions between 1925 and 1953. She was also known as Yola Vermairion and Yola d'Avril Montiague.

== Biography ==
D'Avril was born in Lille, France, and died in Port Hueneme, California as Yola d'Avril Montiague. During World War I, her family relocated to Paris. After her father died in 1923, she moved to Los Angeles. She appeared in MGM's adventure film, Tarzan and His Mate with Italian actor Paul Porcasi as her father, Monsieur Feronde.

== Partial filmography ==
- The Dressmaker from Paris (1925) - Mannequin (uncredited)
- The War Horse (1927) - Yvonne
- Orchids and Ermine (1927) - Telephone Operator
- The Tender Hour (1927) - Cabaret Girl
- Hard-Boiled Haggerty (1927) - Cafe Dancer
- Smile, Brother, Smile (1927) - Daisy
- American Beauty (1927) - Telephone Girl
- The Valley of the Giants (1927) - Felice
- The Noose (1928) - Cabaret Girl
- Lady Be Good (1928) - Assistant
- Vamping Venus (1928) - Stenographer
- Three-Ring Marriage (1928) - Minnie
- The Awakening (1928) - (uncredited)
- House of Horror (1929) - Bit Role (uncredited)
- She Goes to War (1929) - Yvette
- Shanghai Lady (1929) - Lizzie
- The Love Parade (1929) - Paulette (uncredited)
- Hot for Paris (1929) - Yola Dupre
- Double Cross Roads (1930) - Happy Max's Moll (uncredited)
- King of Jazz (1930) - Automobile Owner's Wife ("Springtime") / Marie ("All Noisy on the Eastern Front") (uncredited)
- All Quiet on the Western Front (1930) - Suzanne (uncredited)
- The Bad One (1930) - Gida
- New Movietone Follies of 1930 (1930) - Maid
- Born Reckless (1930) - French Girl
- Those Three French Girls (1930) - Diane
- Just Like Heaven (1930) - Fifi
- The Truth About Youth (1930) - Babette - Kara's Maid (uncredited)
- The Right of Way (1931) - Suzette
- God's Gift to Women (1931) - Dagmar
- Svengali (1931) - Maid (uncredited)
- Just a Gigolo (1931) - Pauline
- The Common Law (1931) - Fifi
- Women Go on Forever (1931) - Pearl
- The Last Flight (1931) - French Party Girl at Cafe (uncredited)
- Suicide Fleet (1931) - French Girl in Tangiers (uncredited)
- Cock of the Air (1932) - Italian Girl #2
- Sky Devils (1932) - Fifi
- Beauty and the Boss (1932) - Girl in Bath Tub (uncredited)
- The Man from Yesterday (1932) - Tony's Cocotte
- A Passport to Hell (1932) - Rosita
- A Parisian Romance (1932) - Pauline
- Diplomaniacs (1933) - French Vamp (uncredited)
- The Cat and the Fiddle (1934) - Maid in House (uncredited)
- Glamour (1934) - Renee
- Tarzan and His Mate (1934) - Madame Feronde (uncredited)
- Monte Carlo Nights (1934) - Madelon
- Kansas City Princess (1934) - French Manicurist (uncredited)
- Straight from the Heart (1935) - French Girl in Taxi (uncredited)
- Captain Blood (1935) - Girl in Tavern (uncredited)
- I Met Him in Paris (1937) - French Wife in Room 617
- The Hurricane (1937) - Club Hibiscus Singer [Sings 'I Can't Give You Anything But Love' in French] (uncredited)
- Gone with the Wind (1939) - Belle's Girl (uncredited)
- Green Hell (1940) - Native Girl (uncredited)
- I Was an Adventuress (1940) - Frenchwoman at Party (uncredited)
- The Lady Has Plans (1942) - Hotel Maid (uncredited)
- Night in New Orleans (1942) - Mme. Lamballe
- A Passport to Hell (1942) - Celestine (uncredited)
- Monsieur Beaucaire (1946) - Housekeeper (uncredited)
- Cloak and Dagger (1946) - First Nurse (uncredited)
- Sorry, Wrong Number (1948) - French Maid (uncredited)
- Red Ball Express (1952) - Barmaid (uncredited)
- Little Boy Lost (1953) - Madame Le Blanc (uncredited) (final film role)
