= El Brendel =

American actor and comedian (1890–1964)

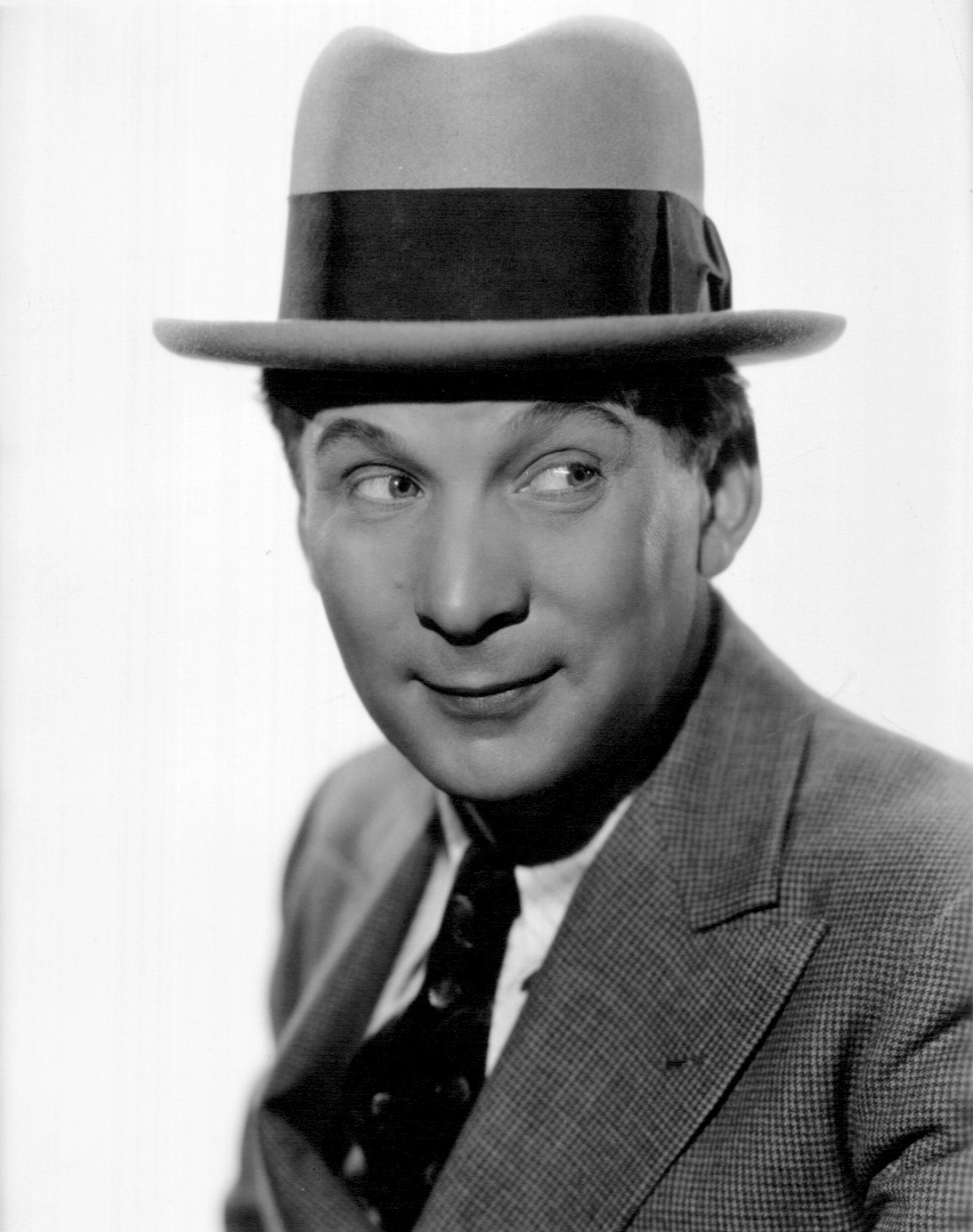
- Brendel in 1933
- Born: Elmer Goodfellow Brendel; March 25, 1890; Philadelphia, Pennsylvania, U.S.
- Died: April 9, 1964 (aged 74); Hollywood, California, U.S.
- Resting place: Hollywood Forever Cemetery
- Education: University of Pennsylvania
- Years active: 1913–1959
- Spouse: Flo Bert (m. 1925–1964)

Elmer Goodfellow "El" Brendel /ˈɛl brɛnˈdɛl/ (March 25, 1890 – April 9, 1964) was an American vaudeville comedian turned movie star, notable for his dialect routine as a Swedish immigrant. His biggest role was as "Single-0" in the science fiction musical Just Imagine (1930), produced by Fox Film Corporation. His screen name was pronounced "El Bren-DEL".

== Early life ==
He was born in Philadelphia, Pennsylvania. He attended the University of Pennsylvania.

He entered vaudeville in 1913 as a German dialect comedian and married his vaudeville partner. Due to anti-German sentiment brought about by the sinking of the RMS Lusitania, Brendel developed a new character, one he would portray on stage and in films for the rest of his career: a good-natured, simple Swede, often called "Oley", "Ole" or "Ollie".

During the 1910s and early 1920s, he appeared with his wife, vaudeville star Flo Bert, doing a married-couple routine. It was during this period that he coined his trademark lines, "Yee vizz!" and "Yumpin' yiminy!" He made his first stage appearance in 1921. He appeared in Cinderella on Broadway, Spice of 1922, Passing Show, and New York Whirl.

== Career ==
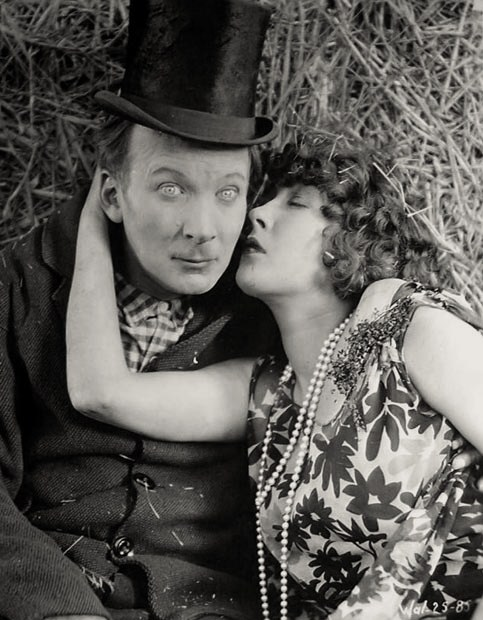
El Brendel and Yola d'Avril in Hot for Paris (1929)

In 1926, he signed a contract with Famous Players Film Company and appeared in eight films there over the next two years, most memorably as the comic relief in Wings (1927) with Clara Bow and Buddy Rogers, a film which won the first Academy Award for Outstanding Production (an award that is comparable to today's Best Picture Oscar.) Brendel played the character Herman Schwimpf, a German-American whose patriotism is at first questioned when he volunteers for service in the United States Army Air Service.

Brendel left Paramount Pictures in 1927 to return to the vaudeville stage before being coaxed back to Hollywood in 1929, signing a contract with Fox Film Corporation. His star immediately rose at the studio, largely in part due to the advent of sound. His "simple Swede" character now had a voice, and his malaprop-ridden dialogue gave his character new appeal. He was featured in the boisterous "Quirt and Flagg" military comedies with Edmund Lowe and Victor McLaglen.

After finishing production of Sunny Side Up with Janet Gaynor, Brendel was the star comedian in New Movietone Follies of 1930, The Big Trail with John Wayne, and the Gershwin musical Delicious with Gaynor, which introduced the song "New York Rhapsody" and featured Brendel's rendition of "Blah Blah Blah". In 1930 Brendel starred in Just Imagine, a science fiction musical directed by David Butler.

In 1931 Fox starred him in the dual roles of Mr. Lemon and Silent McGee in the comedy Mr. Lemon of Orange. While Mr. Lemon of Orange was publicized by Fox as Brendel's first starring role, that distinction is more accurately given to Just Imagine, which was released five months earlier. Brendel was the most popular comedian in America at the time, according to author Richard Barrios.

Despite the positive public reception of Just Imagine and Mr. Lemon of Orange, it was judged that Brendel could not carry an expensive film. He continued to play leads in B-pictures, but served in more prestigious fare mainly in supporting roles, mostly with his trademark Swedish accent. In 1933, he left Fox and had a brief tenure at Warner Bros. Studios making two-reelers, and for the next few years, was a freelance actor. His former director David Butler cast him in two major features, Little Miss Broadway with Shirley Temple, and If I Had My Way co-starring Bing Crosby and Gloria Jean.

In 1936, El Brendel made his debut at Columbia Pictures in a pair of two-reel comedies; producer Jules White liked Brendel's act and hired him for a series in 1941. Brendel was a popular attraction in short subjects (Columbia billed him as "America's Swede-Heart!") and he was often paired with other well-known comedians, including Shemp Howard, Harry Langdon, Tom Kennedy, and Monty Collins. Brendel also starred in feature films for the independent PRC studio. When his PRC and Columbia work ran out in 1945, Brendel went back to vaudeville, returning to the screen only occasionally.

Columbia began re-releasing some of El Brendel's two-reel comedies in 1948. The exposure may have resulted in his being hired for a new feature film, The Beautiful Blonde from Bashful Bend (1949), starring Betty Grable.

In 1950, Brendel recorded four numbers for Imperial Records: Frankie And Johnny, Hulda, Pinch Of Snoose and Yumpin' Yiminy (a loose adaptation of the 1918 song Holy Yumpin Yimini).

During the 1950s, he shared a brief revival with his wife, Flo Bert, on television variety shows, including You Asked For It with Art Baker. He also appeared in a few television series such as Cowboy G-Men, My Little Margie, and Perry Mason. His last film was Laffing Time (1959), a featherweight, sitcom-styled comedy. Producer Edward Finney took the leading role, with Gloria Jean as the feminine lead, and Mr. and Mrs. Brendel as neighbors. Brendel also recorded narration for a proposed children's-television project; some of this footage appears in Finney's feature film Tobo the Happy Clown.

== Death ==
El Brendel died of a heart attack at the Hollywood Presbyterian Hospital in Hollywood, California, on April 9, 1964. He is buried at the Hollywood Forever Cemetery.

== Partial filmography ==
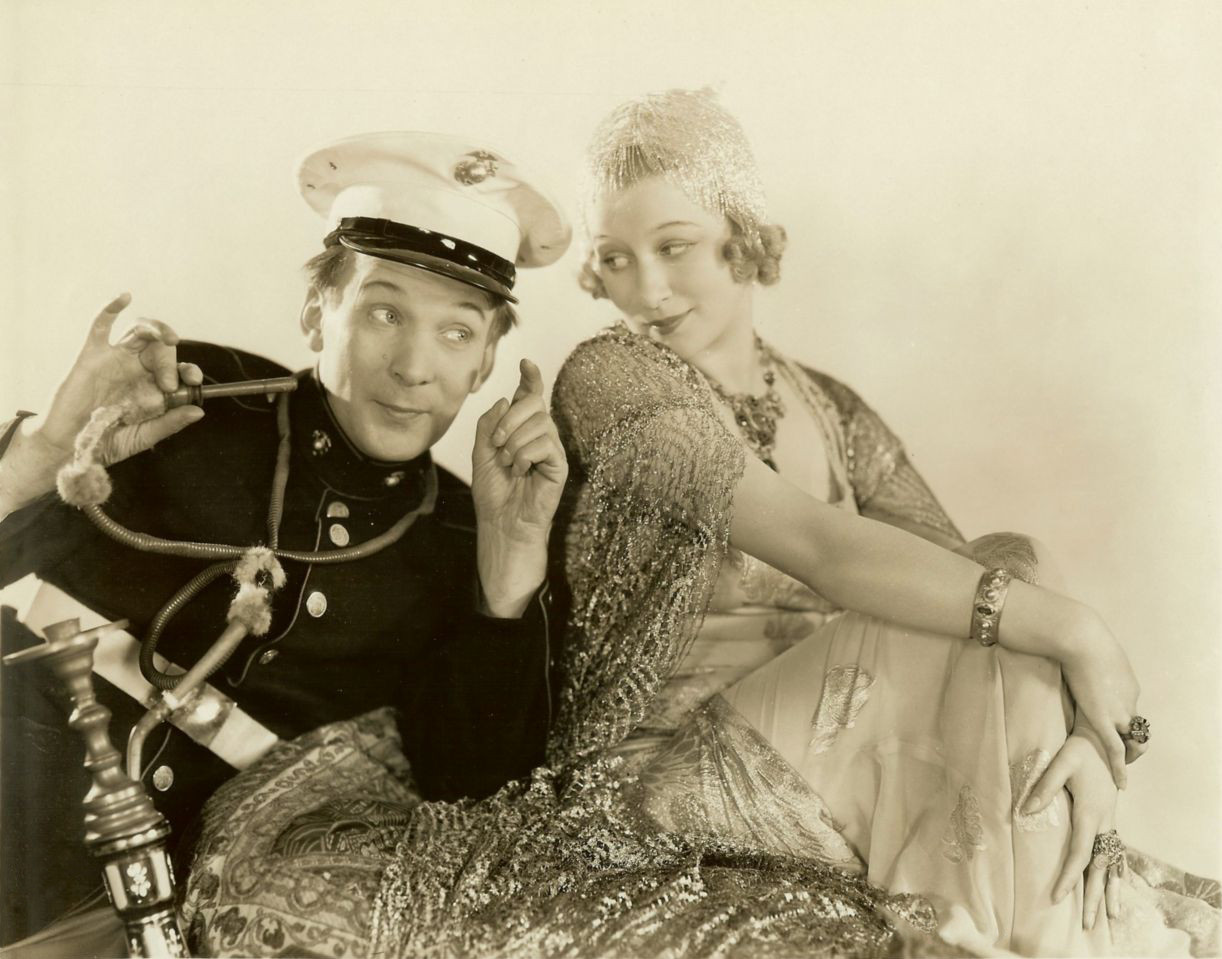
El Brendel and Greta Nissen in Women of All Nations (1931)

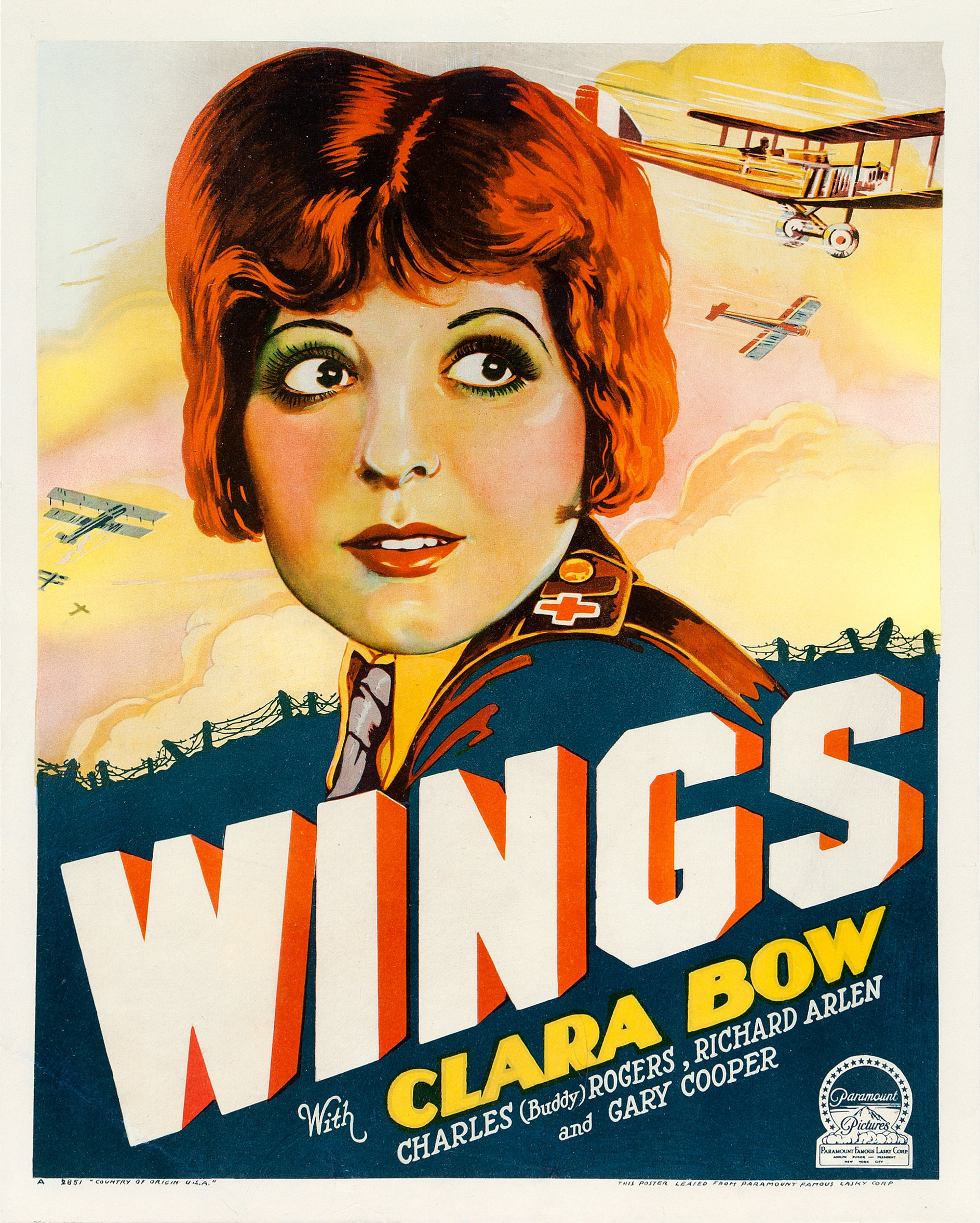
Wings (1927)

El Brendel films may be viewed at the Internet Archive and other video-sharing websites or purchased from online retailers.

Feature films and short subjects in which El Brendel appeared:

- You Never Know Women (1926) – Toberchik
- The Campus Flirt (1926) – Knute Knudson
- Man of the Forest (1926) – Horace Pipp
- Too Many Crooks (1927) – Botts
- Arizona Bound (1927) – 'Oley Smoke' Oleson
- Wings (1927) – Herman Schwimpf
- Rolled Stockings (1927) – Rudolph
- Ten Modern Commandments (1927) – 'Speeding' Shapiro
- The Cock-Eyed World (1929) – 'Yump' Olson
- Happy Days (1929) – Minstrel Show Performer #2
- Frozen Justice (1929) – Swede
- Hot for Paris (1929) – Axel Olson
- Sunny Side Up (1929) – Eric Swenson
- The Golden Calf (1930) – Knute Olson
- New Movietone Follies of 1930 (1930) – Alex Svenson
- The Big Trail (1930) – Gus
- Just Imagine (1930) – Single O
- Mr. Lemon of Orange (1931) – Oscar Lemon / Silent McGee
- Six Cylinder Love (1931) – Janitor
- Women of All Nations (1931) – Olsen
- The Spider (1931) – Ole
- West of Broadway (1931) – Axel 'Swede' Axelson
- Delicious (1931) – Chris Jansen
- Disorderly Conduct (1932) – Olsen
- Handle with Care (1932) – Carl Lundstrom
- Born to Fight (1932) – Swiebach
- Olsen's Big Moment (1933) – Knute Olsen
- Hot Pepper (1933) – Olsen
- The Last Trail (1933) – Newt Olsen
- My Lips Betray (1933) – Oswald Stigmat, Chauffeur
- The Meanest Gal in Town (1934) – Chris Peterson
- What, No Men! (1935, Short) – Gus Olsen – Gas Company Representative
- Career Woman (1936) – Chris Erleson
- God's Country and the Woman (1937) – Ole Olson
- The Holy Terror (1937) – 'Bugs' Svenson
- Blonde Trouble (1937) – Window Washer
- Happy Landing (1938) – Yonnie
- Little Miss Broadway (1938) – Ole
- Valley of the Giants (1938) – 'Fats'
- Risky Business (1939) – Axel
- Code of the Streets (1939) – Mickhail 'Micky' Bjorgulfsen
- The House of Fear (1939) – Jeff
- Call a Messenger (1939) – 'Baldy'
- If I Had My Way (1940) – Axel Swenson
- Captain Caution (1940) – Slushy
- Gallant Sons (1940) – Olaf Larsen
- Yumpin Yiminy! (1941) – Ole Brendel
- Phoney Cronies (1942, Short) – Oley
- Machine Gun Mama (1944) – Ollie Swenson
- I'm from Arkansas (1944) – Oly
- Pistol Packin' Nitwits (1945, Short) – Professor Brendel
- The Beautiful Blonde from Bashful Bend (1949) – Mr. Jorgensen
- Paris Model (1953) – Papa Jensen
- The She-Creature (1956) – Olaf
- Laffing Time (1959) – Efrem "Blobbsy" Blobbs

== See also ==
- Scandinavian dialect humor
- Porter Strong
