= Marjorie White =

Canadian film and stage actress (1904–35)

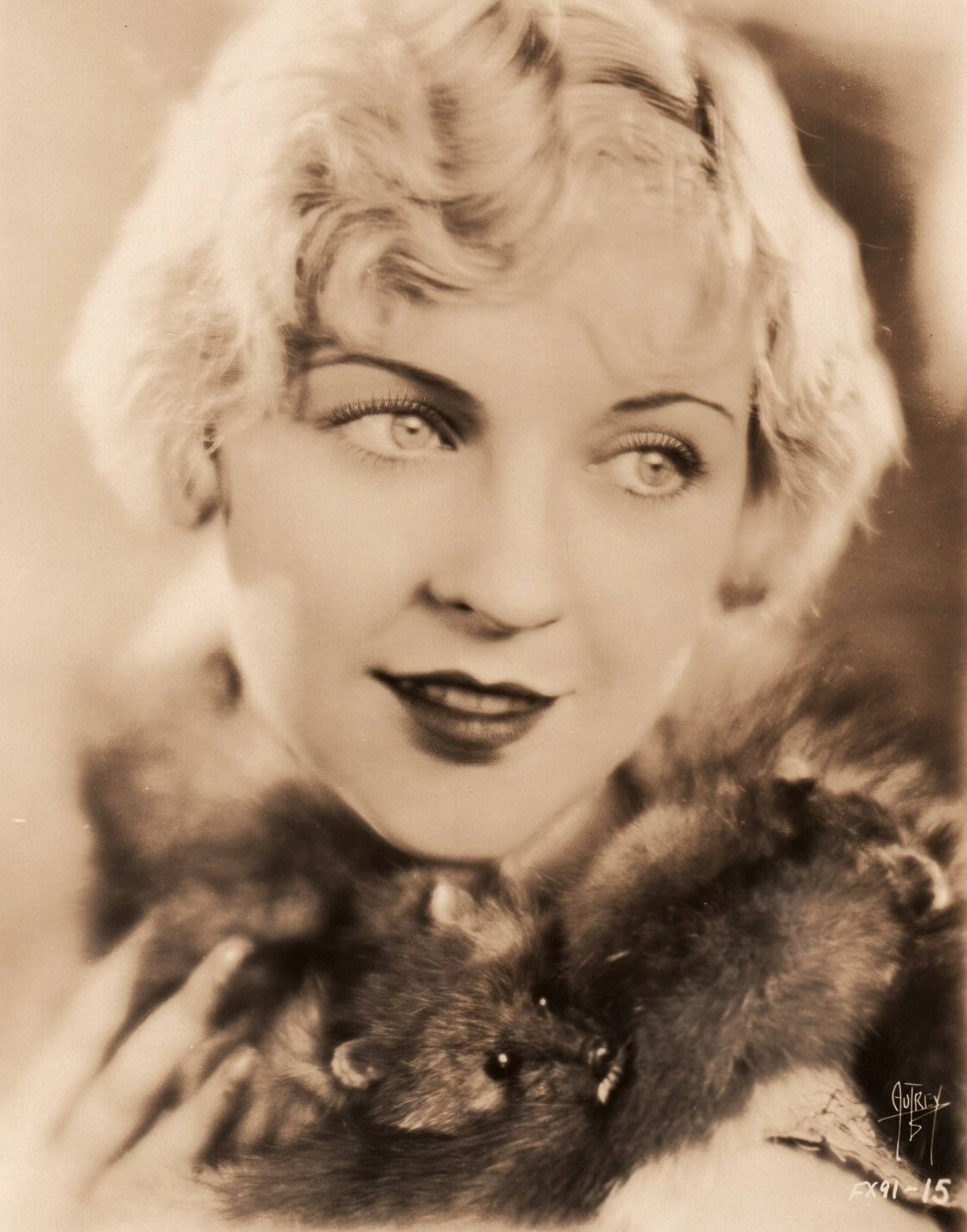
- White in the 1920s
- Born: Marjorie Ann Guthrie; July 22, 1904; Winnipeg, Manitoba, Canada
- Died: August 21, 1935 (aged 31); Hollywood, California, U.S.
- Occupation: Actress
- Years active: 1929–1935
- Spouse: Edwin J. Tierney (1924–1935; her death)

Marjorie White (born Marjorie Ann Guthrie, July 22, 1904 – August 21, 1935) was a Canadian-born actress of stage and film.

== Career ==
Born in Winnipeg, Manitoba, Canada, she was the first-born child of a grain merchant, Robert Guthrie, and his wife. She entered show business at age 8 or age 10, as one of the Winnipeg Kiddies, a troupe of child performers who toured Canada and the United States. She danced and sang with the troupe until too old to continue; then at age 17, in December 1921, she went to San Francisco and joined Thelma Wolpa in amateur vaudeville comedy.

Teamed for a time with Thelma Wolpa as "Wolpa and Guthrie, Little Bits of Everything", the double act became "The White Sisters" in New York City. Both women kept the name White after the act broke up; Thelma White went on to make movie shorts for Vitaphone, and Marjorie White became established on the stage and screen.

Marjorie White married Eddie Tierney on August 10, 1924, in Greenwich, Connecticut. She appeared on Broadway in several musicals between 1926 and 1929, when her husband and she moved to Hollywood. In accordance with studio tradition, four years were knocked off her birth date and she was supposedly born in 1908.

She began getting parts in pictures, starting with leading roles in Happy Days (1929) and Sunny Side Up (1929). The same year, she was required by executives of the Fox Film studio to lose four pounds to secure a role in The New Orleans Frolic. White was diminutive to begin with, weighing only 103 pounds and standing 4'10" tall. The part called for a woman who weighed less than 100 pounds. She returned to Broadway for a musical, Hot-Cha, in 1932, but came back to Hollywood thereafter.

She also can be recognized by fans of "Charlie Chan" films in a prominent, if brief, uncredited role in the 1931 Fox film The Black Camel starring Warner Oland and featuring Bela Lugosi and Robert Young in what may have been his first leading role. Marjorie appeared as a forward, and rather sarcastic, young woman among the usual group under suspicion during Charlie's investigation.

In 1933, White had a featured role in the Joseph Mankiewicz-scripted political satire Diplomaniacs starring the team of Wheeler and Woolsey. Marjorie is Dolores, a femme fatale custom-ordered by the film's villain (she arrives wrapped in plastic from a chute in the wall) to seduce Willy (Bert Wheeler) and steal secret plans from him. In a send-up of the typical boy-girl romantic song scenes of the era, Wheeler and White's duet "Sing to Me" is performed while the tiny White physically assaults Wheeler because he is reluctant to sing to her.

She also appeared with Joan Crawford in Possessed in 1931. She was also in the Fox feature films Just Imagine and New Movietone Follies of 1930 (both 1930).

White is best known to today's audiences for her co-starring role in the first Three Stooges short made at Columbia Pictures, Woman Haters (1934). She played Larry Fine's new bride, who must be kept secret from Larry's fellow Woman Haters Club members (who are both wooed by White behind Larry's back). The entire comedy short is done in rhyming verse. Woman Haters was her last film.

== Death ==
On August 20, 1935, White was a passenger in a car driven by Marlow M. Lovell on the Roosevelt Highway near the Bel Air Beach Club, in Santa Monica, California. It sideswiped the car of a couple who had been married only an hour before, and overturned. A coroner's jury decided that the reckless driving of Lovell was to blame for the accident. White was riding with Lovell in the open car because another member of the party, Gloria Gould, was without a wrap. Gould was following Lovell's car in another vehicle with White's husband. White was the only person seriously injured. She died of internal hemorrhaging the next day, August 21, 1935, at a Hollywood hospital.

She was buried at Hollywood Memorial Cemetery (now Hollywood Forever Cemetery).

== Filmography ==
Year	Title	Role	Notes
1929	Happy Days	Margie	
1929	Sunny Side Up	Bea Nichols	
1930	The Golden Calf	Alice	
1930	New Movietone Follies of 1930	Vera Fontaine	
1930	Just Imagine	D-6	
1930	Oh, For a Man!	Totsy Franklin	
1931	Charlie Chan Carries On	Sadie	Lost film
1931	Women of All Nations	Margie aka Pee Wee	Uncredited
1931	The Black Camel	Rita Ballou	Uncredited
1931	Broadminded	Penny Packer	
1931	Possessed	Vernice LaVerne	
1933	Diplomaniacs	Dolores	
1933	Her Bodyguard	Lita	
1934	Woman Haters	Mary	Short, (final film role)
