= New Movietone Follies of 1930 =

1930 film

- Theatrical release poster
- Directed by: Benjamin Stoloff
- Written by: William K. Wells
- Produced by: William Fox
- Starring: El Brendel; Marjorie White; William Collier Jr. Miriam Seegar; Huntley Gordon; Yola d'Avril
- Music by: Joseph McCarthy; George Lipschultz
- Color process: Multicolor
- Production company: Fox Film Corporation
- Distributed by: Fox Film Corporation
- Release date: May 4, 1930
- Running time: 84 minutes
- Country: United States
- Language: English

New Movietone Follies of 1930 is a 1930 American pre-Code musical film released by Fox Film Corporation, directed by Benjamin Stoloff. The film stars El Brendel and Marjorie White who also costarred in Fox's Just Imagine in 1930.

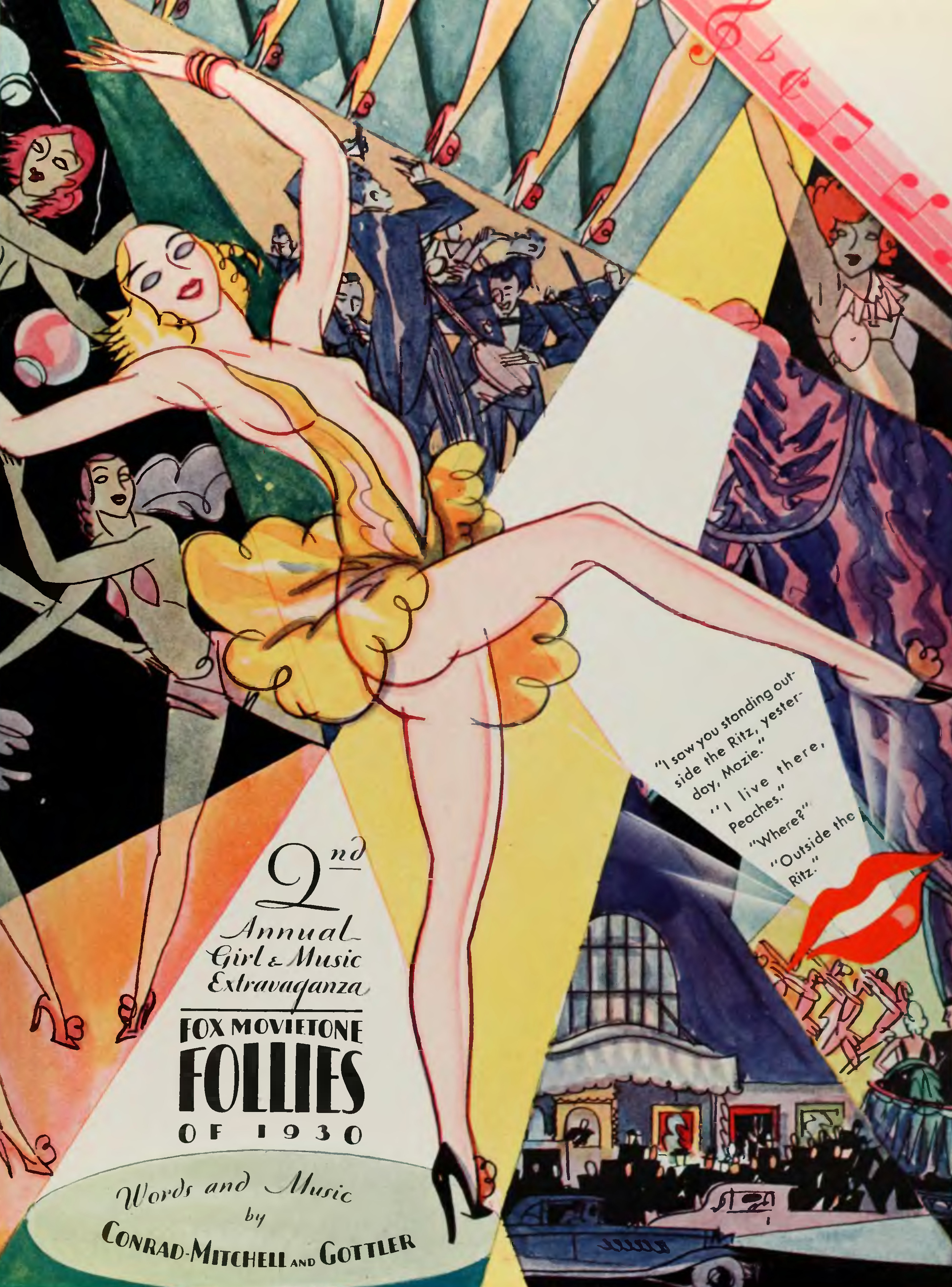
Fox Movietone Follies of 1930 ad in The Film Daily, 1929

The film is a follow-up to Fox Movietone Follies of 1929 and has sequences filmed in Multicolor. An archival 35mm print of the film is in the collection of the UCLA Film & Television Archive.

== Cast ==
- El Brendel as Alex Svenson
- Marjorie White as Vera Fontaine
- Frank Richardson as George Randall
- Noel Francis as Gloria de Witt
- William Collier Jr. as Conrad Sterling
- Miriam Seegar as Mary Mason
- Paul Nicholson as Lee Hubert
- Huntley Gordon as Marvin Kinsley
- Yola d'Avril as Maid
- Betty Grable as Chorine (uncredited)

== See also ==
- List of early color feature films
