= Monte Collins =

American actor (1898–1951)

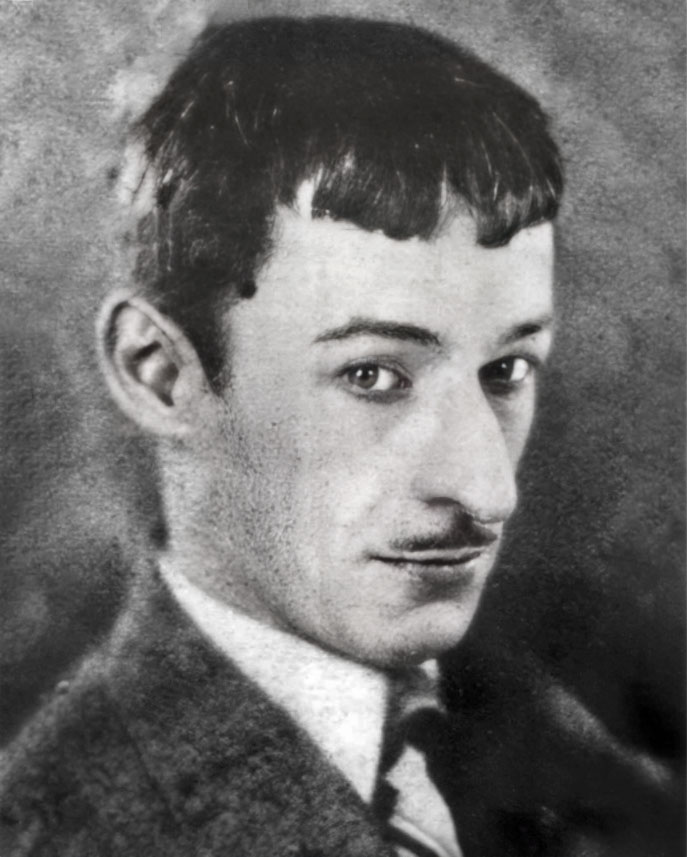
- Collins as he appeared around 1928
- Born: Monte Francis Collins, Jr. December 3, 1898; New York, New York U.S.
- Died: June 1, 1951 (aged 52); Hollywood, California U.S.
- Resting place: Glen Haven Memorial Park; Sylmar, California
- Occupation(s): Actor; Screenwriter
- Years active: 1920–1951

Monte Collins (also credited as Monty Collins; December 3, 1898 – June 1, 1951) was an American film actor and screenwriter. He appeared in more than 160 films between 1920 and 1948. He also wrote for 32 films between 1930 and 1951.

== Career ==
Dapper, pencil-mustached Collins starred in silent short comedies in the late 1920s. These were produced by Educational Pictures and often directed by Jules White. Prior, he had worked as a director in Portland, Oregon. The coming of sound in movies had no ill effect on Collins's career; he was not as big a name as Buster Keaton or Laurel and Hardy, so Collins had no preconceived screen image that could be shattered by talkies. Although Collins took to talkies easily (he and Vernon Dent sing together in the early sound short Ticklish Business), he never established himself as a major comedy star. Throughout the 1930s he appeared in secondary roles (businessmen, butlers, soldiers, salesmen, etc.) in both feature films and short subjects.

Collins was usually Jules White's first choice when casting supporting players. White's 1932 short Show Business, starring ZaSu Pitts and Thelma Todd, co-stars Collins as the frustrated manager of a vaudeville troupe traveling by train. (Collins reprised the role in White's 1947 remake, Training for Trouble, starring Gus Schilling and Richard Lane.) When Jules White organized the short-subject department at Columbia Pictures in 1933, he remembered Collins and hired him. (Collins appears as "Mr. Zero," airing a grievance in the Three Stooges' first Columbia short, Woman Haters.)

Columbia historian Ted Okuda says Monte Collins was the Dan Aykroyd of his day: a reliable, skilled comedian who usually assisted other stars in getting laughs, rather than driving the action by himself. Jules White recognized this capability, and teamed Collins with "big and dumb" comic Tom Kennedy. The Collins & Kennedy partnership ran only a few years, but White continued to use both actors as all-purpose supporting players. White co-starred Monte Collins in three of his Buster Keaton comedies; Collins also appeared prominently in Columbia comedies with Harry Langdon, Charley Chase, El Brendel, Andy Clyde, Vera Vague, and The Three Stooges. He was memorably cast as the Stooges' mother in their 1942 comedy Cactus Makes Perfect.

Collins also contributed to the staging of visual gags, and he began receiving screen credit as a writer (now as "Monty" Collins) in 1942. He worked behind the scenes throughout the 1940s as a writer or dialogue coach, while appearing occasionally in front of the cameras. In 1947, he partnered with actor Robert Paige to produce an independent feature film, The Green Promise.

One of his last credits was supplying material for Laurel and Hardy's final film, Atoll K (1951). Filmed in France by French and Italian cast and crew members, the production was hectic and chaotic for the English-speaking stars. The finished film carries the unique credit, "Gags by Monty Collins."

== Death ==
Collins was about to launch a career in television when he died of a heart attack in 1951, at age 52. He was interred at Glen Haven Memorial Park in Sylmar.

== Partial filmography ==
- A Midnight Bell (1921) (uncredited)
- The Cup of Life (1921)
- Come on Over (1922) as Dugan
- Captain Fly-by-Night (1922) (uncredited)
- Our Hospitality (1923)
- Men (1924)
- Changing Husbands (1924)
- That Man Jack! (1925)
- All Around Frying Pan (1925)
- 45 Minutes from Hollywood (1926)
- The Cowboy and the Countess (1926)
- It's a Cinch (1932)
- Keep Laughing (1932)
- Anybody's Goat (1932)
- Woman Haters (1934)
- Oh, My Nerves (1935)
- Born to Fight (1936)
- Too Many Wives (1937)
- Hollywood Round-Up (1937)
- Behind the Mike (1937)
- The Great Adventures of Wild Bill Hickok (1938)
- Three Missing Links (1938)
- Star Reporter (1939)
- Mooching Through Georgia (1939)
- Buck Benny Rides Again (1940)
- A Plumbing We Will Go (1940)
- Midnight Limited (1940)
- My Life with Caroline (1941)
- Cactus Makes Perfect (1942)
- Matri-Phony (1942)
- Phoney Cronies (1942) short subject
- A Lady Takes a Chance (1943)
- The Town Went Wild (1944)
- Campus Sleuth (1948)
