= Tom Buckingham =

American film director

- Born: February 25, 1895; Chicago, Illinois, USA
- Died: September 7, 1934 (aged 39)
- Occupation: Film director
- Years active: 1920-1932

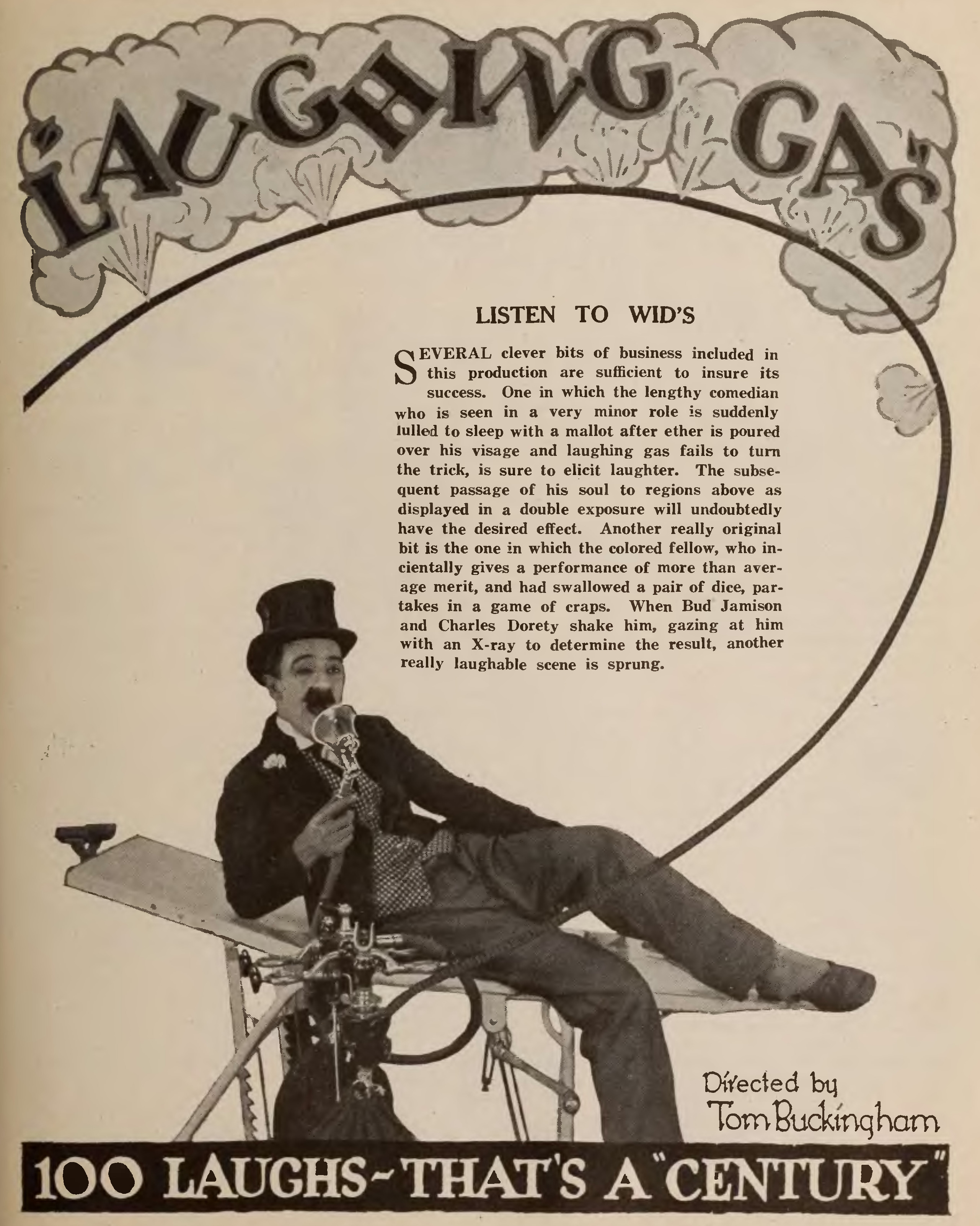
"Laughing Gas" 1920 ad, directed by Tom Buckingham from Moving Picture Weekly

Tom Buckingham (February 25, 1895 – September 7, 1934) was an American film director and screenwriter. He directed 48 films between 1920 and 1932. He was born in Chicago, Illinois, and died from surgical complications. His film Cock of the Air was restored by the Academy Film Archive in 2016.

== Partial filmography ==
- The Atom (1918)
- The Reckoning Day (1918)
- Laughing Gas (1920) (director and screenwriter)
- Golf (1922) (director and screenwriter)
- The Agent (1922) (director and screenwriter)
- Arizona Express (1924) (director)
- The Cyclone Rider (1924) (director)
- Troubles of a Bride (1924) (director)
- Forbidden Cargo (1925) (director)
- Ladies of Leisure (1926) (director)
- Lure of the Night Club (1927) (director)
- Crashing Through (1928)
- Hell's Island (1930)
- Officer O'Brien (1930)
- Cock of the Air (1932) (director)
- The Secret Bride (1934) (screenwriter)
- Stage Struck (1936)
