= Little Lord Fauntleroy (1936 film) =

1936 film by John Cromwell

- Theatrical release poster
- Directed by: John Cromwell
- Screenplay by: Hugh Walpole
- Based on: Little Lord Fauntleroy; 1886 novel by Frances Hodgson Burnett
- Produced by: David O. Selznick
- Starring: Freddie Bartholomew; Dolores Costello; C. Aubrey Smith; Mickey Rooney; Guy Kibbee; Henry Stephenson
- Cinematography: Charles Rosher
- Edited by: Hal C. Kern
- Music by: Max Steiner
- Production company: Selznick International Pictures
- Distributed by: United Artists
- Release date: March 6, 1936 (United States)
- Running time: 101 minutes
- Country: United States
- Language: English
- Budget: $590,000

Little Lord Fauntleroy is a 1936 American drama film directed by John Cromwell, based on the 1886 novel of the same name by Frances Hodgson Burnett. It stars Freddie Bartholomew, Dolores Costello, C. Aubrey Smith, Mickey Rooney, Guy Kibbee, and Henry Stephenson. The first film produced by David O. Selznick's Selznick International Pictures, it was the studio's most profitable film until Gone with the Wind.

The film was critically well received and is now in the public domain. In 2012 it was released on Blu-ray Disc by Kino Lorber, following a restoration by the George Eastman House Motion Picture Department.

== Plot ==
Young Cedric "Ceddie" Errol and his widowed mother, whom he calls "Dearest", live frugally in 1880s Brooklyn after the death of his father. Cedric's prejudiced English grandfather, the Earl of Dorincourt, had long ago disowned his son for marrying an American.

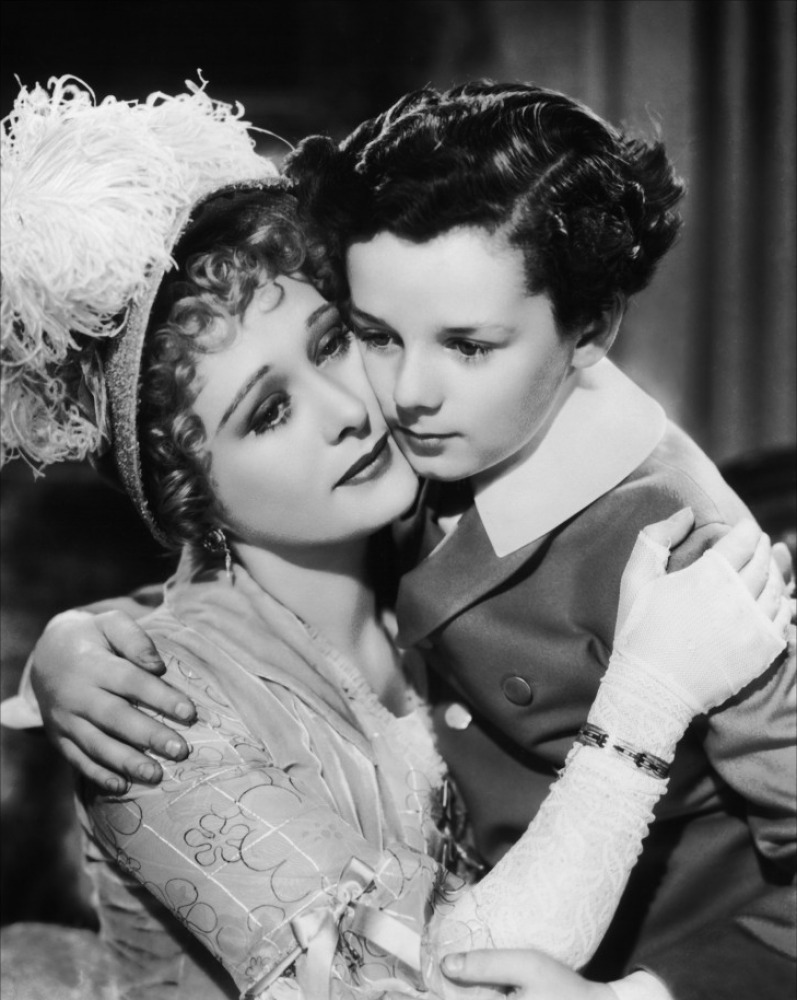
Dolores Costello and Freddie Bartholomew

The Earl sends his lawyer Havisham to bring Ceddie to England. As the Earl's sons are all dead, Ceddie is the only remaining heir to the title. Mrs. Errol accompanies her son to England, but is not allowed to live at Dorincourt castle. For Cedric's happiness, she does not tell him it is because of his grandfather's bigotry. Havisham is favorably impressed by the young widow's wisdom. However, the Earl expresses skepticism when Havisham informs him that Cedric's mother will not accept an allowance from him.

Cedric soon wins the hearts of his stern grandfather and everyone else. The Earl hosts a grand party to proudly introduce his grandson to British society, notably his sister Lady Constantia Lorridaile.

After the party, Havisham informs the Earl that Cedric is not the heir apparent after all. American Minna Tipton insists her son Tom is the offspring of her late husband, the Earl's eldest son. Heartbroken, the Earl accepts her apparently valid claim, though Tom proves to be a rather obnoxious lad.

Ceddie's friend Dick Tipton recognizes Minna from her newspaper picture. He takes his brother Ben, Tom's real father, to England and disproves Minna's claim. The Earl apologizes to Ceddie's mother and invites her to live with the delighted Ceddie in his castle.

== Cast ==
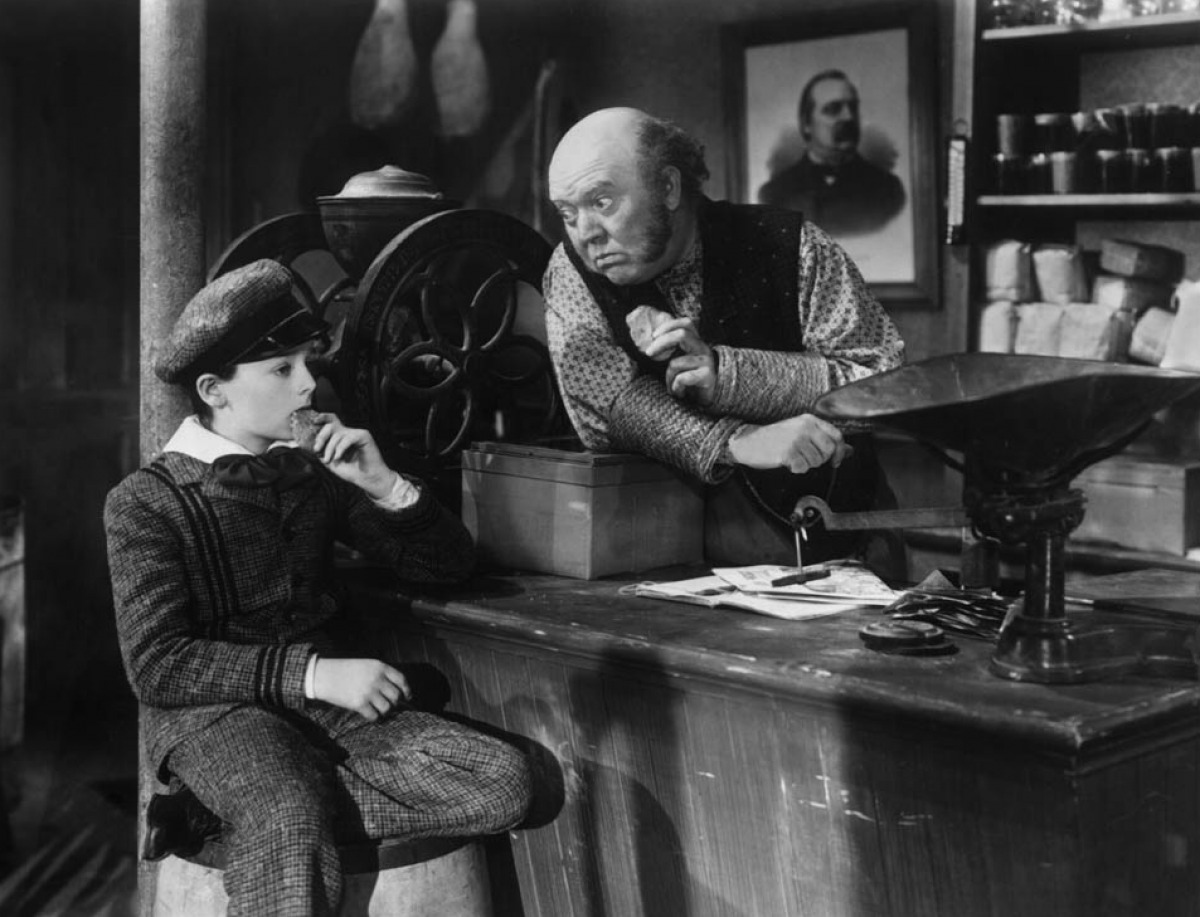
Freddie Bartholomew, Guy Kibbee

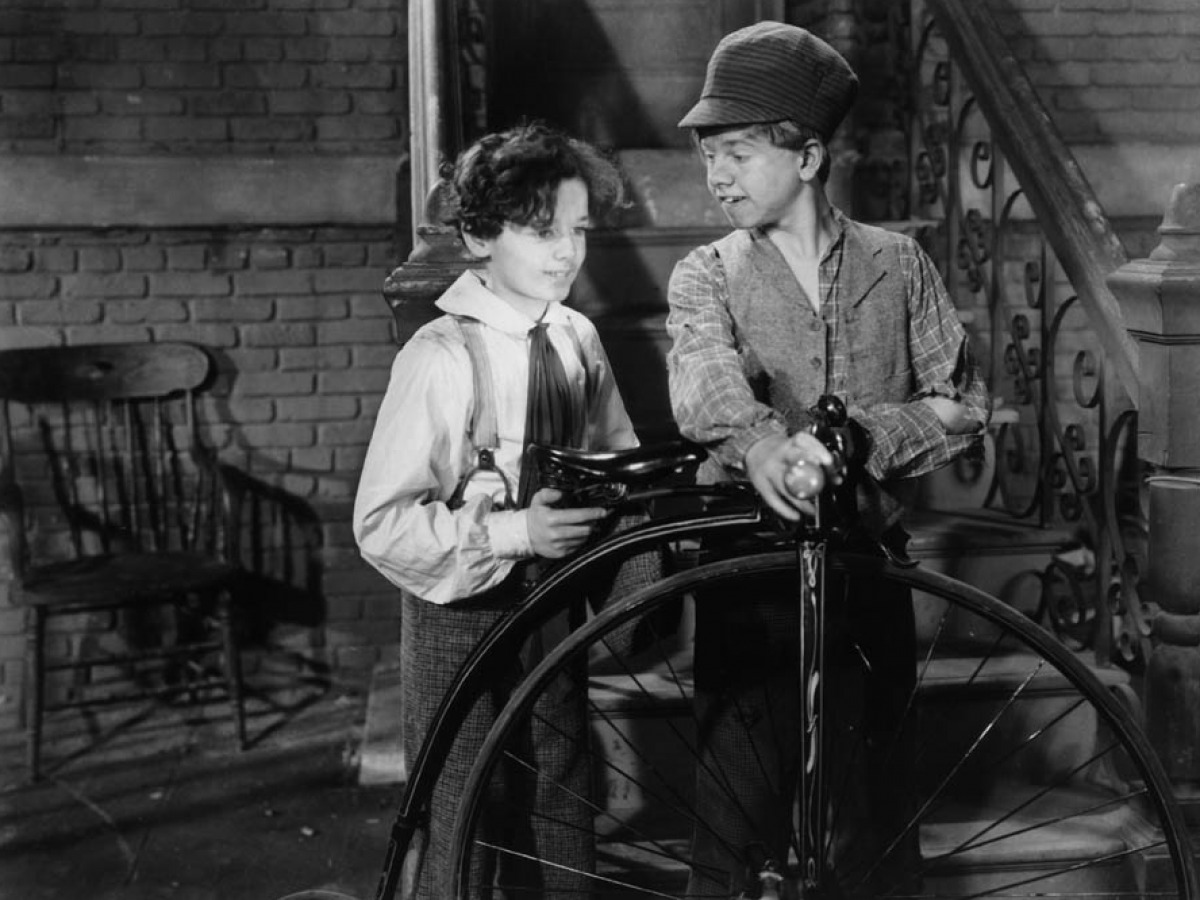
Freddie Bartholomew, Mickey Rooney

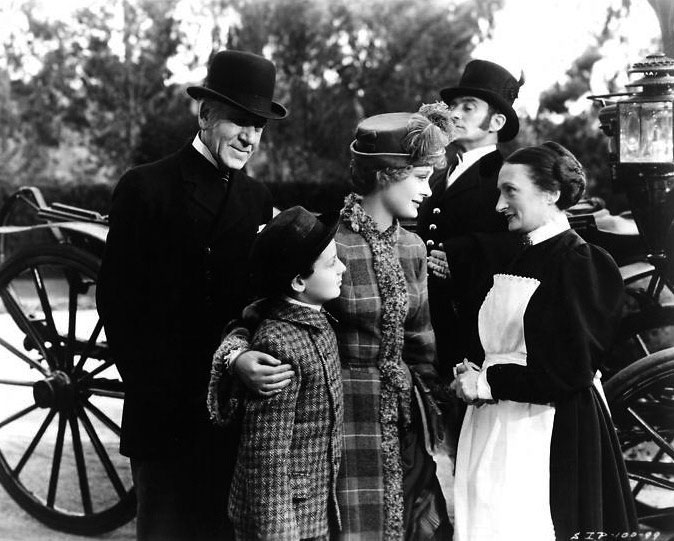
Henry Stephenson, Freddie Bartholomew, Dolores Costello, Una O'Connor

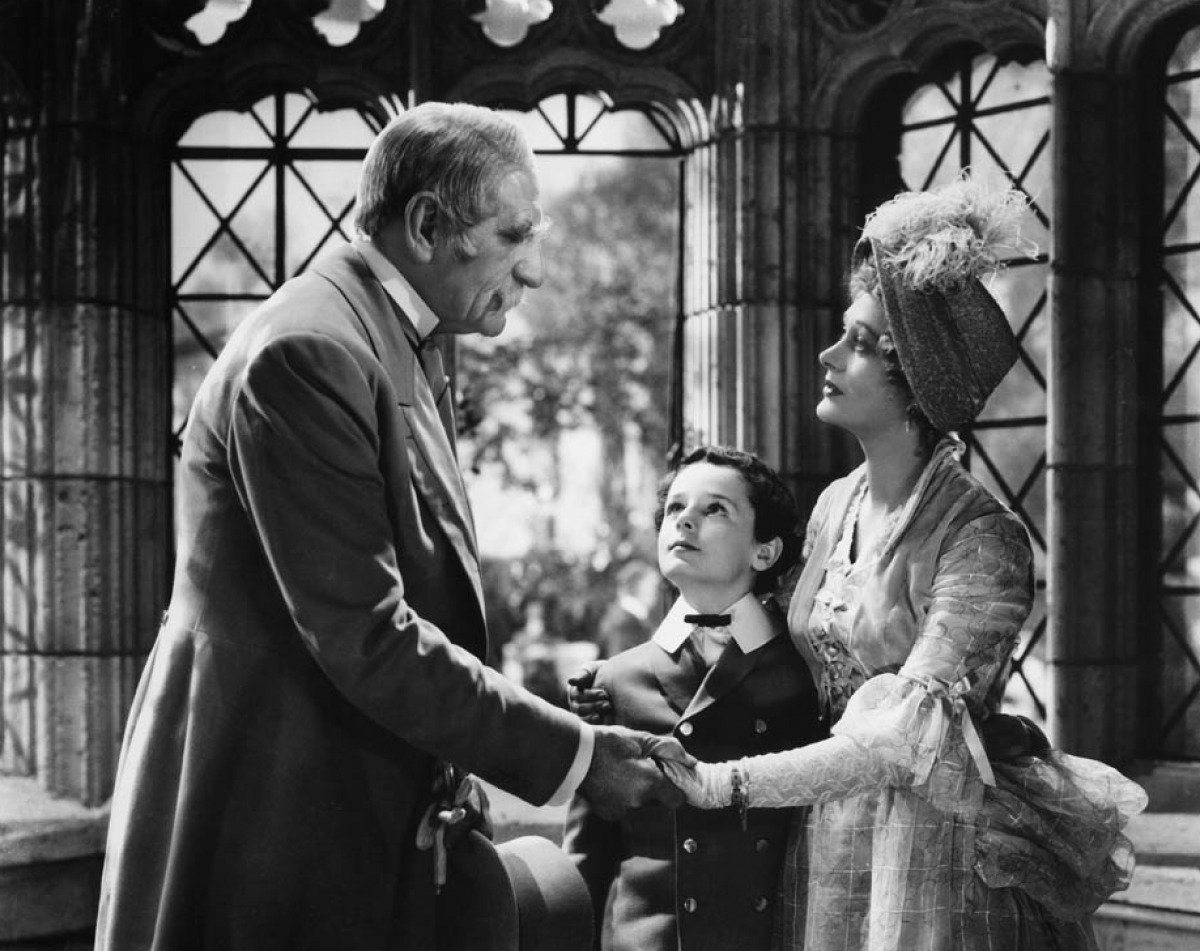
C. Aubrey Smith, Freddie Bartholomew, Dolores Costello

The cast of Little Lord Fauntleroy is listed at the American Film Institute Catalog of Feature Films.

- Freddie Bartholomew as Cedric "Ceddie" Errol, Lord Fauntleroy
- Dolores Costello Barrymore as "Dearest" Errol, Ceddie's mother
- C. Aubrey Smith as the Earl of Dorincourt, Ceddie's father's father
- Guy Kibbee as Silas Hobbs, a Brooklyn grocer
- Henry Stephenson as Havisham, the Earl's lawyer
- Mickey Rooney as Dick Tipton, a Brooklyn bootblack
- Una O'Connor as Mary, the Errols' servant
- Constance Collier as Lady Constantia Lorridaile, the Earl's sister
- Jackie Searl as Tom Tipton, Minna's son
- Jessie Ralph as Mrs. McGillicuddy, a Brooklyn applewoman
- Helen Flint as Minna Tipton
- Walter Kingsford as Joshua Snade, Minna's lawyer
- E. E. Clive as Sir Harry Lorridaile, Constantia's husband
- Ivan F. Simpson as Reverend Mordaunt
- Virginia Field as Miss Herbert, the young woman who sings at the party
- Eric Alden as Ben Tipton, Dick's older brother
- May Beatty as Mrs. Mellon, the chambermaid at the castle
- Reginald Barlow as Newick, the Earl's debt collector
- Lionel Belmore as Higgins, the farmer
- Tempe Pigott as Mrs. Dibble, a village woman
- Gilbert Emery as Purvis, the doorman at the castle
- Lawrence Grant as Lord Chief Justice
- Eily Malyon as landlady
- Fred Walton as landlord
- Robert Emmett O'Connor as the policeman in Brooklyn
- Elsa Buchanan as Susan, the parlor maid
- William Ingersoll as the doctor (uncredited)
- Daisy Belmore as Mrs. Baines, the cook (uncredited)
- Joseph Tozer as Thomas, a servant at the castle (uncredited)

== Production ==
Little Lord Fauntleroy was the first film produced by Selznick International Pictures, created by David O. Selznick when he left Metro-Goldwyn-Mayer. While he was still at MGM, Selznick purchased the rights to the story from Mary Pickford for $11,500 and secured the performance of his David Copperfield discovery, Freddie Bartholomew. It was the final film for which Sophie Wachner designed costumes.

Ben Hecht, Richard Schayer, and Selznick himself polished the screenplay commissioned from Hugh Walpole. Directed by John Cromwell, the film was shot during the last two months of 1935. Made within its budget of $500,000, the film's final cost was $590,000.

The film was released through United Artists after a world premiere March 4, 1936, at Foundation Hospital in Warm Springs, Georgia.

== Box office ==
By 1939, Little Lord Fauntleroy had earned an estimated profit of $447,000. It was Selznick International Pictures' most profitable film until Gone With the Wind.

== Critical response ==
Frank S. Nugent of the New York Times reviewed the film during its run at Radio City Music Hall, his favorable review appearing in on April 3, 1936.

== Home media ==
Long in the public domain, Little Lord Fauntleroy was released on DVD and Blu-ray Disc by Kino Lorber in 2012. The film was remastered by the George Eastman House Motion Picture Department, from Selznick's personal print.

DVD Talk wrote: "This Kino Classics release, while far from perfect, sources an original 35mm nitrate print resulting in a better than acceptable presentation. And unless original film elements turn up, this is probably the best Little Lord Fauntleroy is going to look for the foreseeable future. Highly recommended".

== See also ==
- Little Lord Fauntleroy (1921)
- Little Lord Fauntleroy (1980)
