= Anybody's Goat =

1932 film

- Directed by: Fatty Arbuckle (as William Goodrich)
- Starring: Monte Collins
- Release date: January 24, 1932
- Country: United States
- Language: English

Anybody's Goat is a 1932 American Pre-Code comedy film directed by Fatty Arbuckle and starring Monte Collins.

== Plot and reception ==
"Three crooks try to procure the money of a country girl with an elaborate story about a goat which has swallowed a purse", according to a summary in Motion Picture Reviews, which also described the one-reel film as "harmless but not very entertaining." Rita C. McGoldrick in the Motion Picture Herald found the comedy "amusing for all ages."

== Cast ==
- Monte Collins

== See also ==
- List of American films of 1932
- Fatty Arbuckle filmography
