= The Cyclone Rider =

1924 film

- Directed by: Tom Buckingham
- Written by: Lincoln J. Carter
- Starring: Reed Howes
- Cinematography: Sidney Wagner
- Distributed by: Fox Film Corporation
- Release date: September 14, 1924
- Running time: 7 reels
- Country: United States
- Language: Silent

The Cyclone Rider is a 1924 American silent adventure film directed by Tom Buckingham. Prints of the film survive in the Czech Film Archive.

== Cast ==
- Reed Howes as Richard Armstrong
- Alma Bennett as Doris Steele
- William Bailey as Reynard Trask
- Margaret McWade as Mrs. Armstrong
- Frank Beal as Robert Steele
- Evelyn Brent as Weeping Wanda
- Eugene Pallette as Eddie
- Ben Deeley as Silent Dan
- Heinie Conklin as Remus (as Charles Conklin)
- Bud Jamison as Romulus
