= Phoney Cronies =

- Directed by: Harry Edwards
- Starring: El Brendel Tom Kennedy Dudley Dickerson Monte Collins George J. Lewis (Uncredited) Ned Glass (Uncredited) George Ovey (Uncredited)
- Distributed by: Columbia Pictures
- Release date: 27 August 1942
- Running time: 18 min.
- Country: United States
- Language: English

Phoney Cronies is a 1942 American comedy short by Columbia Pictures starring El Brendel, Tom Kennedy, Dudley Dickerson, and Monte Collins.

== Plot ==
Oley (El Brendel), Tom (Tom Kennedy), and Petty Larsen (Dudley Dickerson), employees of a storage company, are tasked with bringing a crate of artifacts to a museum during the night. They are unaware that the crate secrets a thief who intends to rob the museum of its priceless Buddha statue.
