= Diplomaniacs =

1933 film by William A. Seiter

- Film Sheet Music
- Directed by: William A. Seiter
- Written by: Joseph L. Mankiewicz (screenplay and story); Henry Myers (screenplay)
- Produced by: Merian C. Cooper (executive producer); Sam Jaffe (associate producer)
- Starring: Bert Wheeler; Robert Woolsey; Marjorie White; Phyllis Barry; Louis Calhern; Edgar Kennedy
- Cinematography: Edward Cronjager
- Edited by: William Hamilton
- Music by: Uncredited: Max Steiner; Roy Webb; Songs: Harry Akst (music and lyrics); Edward Eliscu (music and lyrics); Others: Bernhard Kaun (orchestration); Eddie Sharpe (orchestration)
- Distributed by: RKO Radio Pictures
- Release date: April 29, 1933
- Running time: 61 minutes
- Country: United States
- Language: English
- Budget: $242,000
- Box office: $461,000

Diplomaniacs is a 1933 American pre-Code comedy film starring Wheeler and Woolsey. The film in noted for its absurdist political satire, somewhat in the manner of Million Dollar Legs or Duck Soup, both of which were released within a year of Diplomaniacs.

== Plot ==
Willy Nilly and Hercules Glub are barbers with next to no customers: their shop is on an Indian reservation (an opening text states that the Indians do not grow facial hair). The tribe, newly rich from oil drilling, pays them to represent their Nation at a peace conference in Switzerland. Unbeknownst to them, an armaments manufacturer producing highly explosive bullets wants to ensure that the peace conference is a failure, and do everything they can to sabotage it: the general manager, Winkelreid, assisted by Wise Gai Chow-Chow, hires a vamp, Dolores, to distract Willy and Hercules and steal their secret documents.

Willy and Hercules, unaware of the intrigue surrounding them, persist in carrying out their mission, delayed by 8 months after the captain of their steamship gets drunk and steers wildly off course. In Europe, Winkelreid is joined by four directors of the firm, Schmerzenpuppen, Puppenschmerzen, Schmerzenschmerzen and Puppenpuppen; they go to a dive bar, the Dead Rat, and hire a second femme fatale, Fifi. Once in Geneva, Willy and Hercules find the peace conference delegates at each other's throats. They attempt to mollify the crowd with some vaudeville routines; after withdrawing to another room between acts, Winkelreid throws a bomb into the delegates' chamber, causing everyone in the room to be in blackface when Willy and Hercules return. In response, they also don blackface and sing a minstrel spiritual about peace. Chow-Chow gives up and returns to China in a rowboat. Winkelreid and the four directors forge a letter from the prime ministers of the world powers promising to end all war, and slips it under the door of Willy and Hercules's hotel room; one of the directors then accidentally drops a sample bullet, which explodes and vaporizes the four directors and Winkelreid (leaving only their shoes and hats).

Elated, Willy and Hercules return to the reservation by airplane; as they fly, the world leaders, incensed at their names being forged to a peace treaty, start a world war. Willy and Hercules land, expecting a heroes' welcome, only to find themselves drafted into the army to fight in the new war.

== Cast ==
- Bert Wheeler as Willy Nilly
- Robert Woolsey as Hercules Glub
- Marjorie White as Dolores
- Phyllis Barry as Fifi
- Louis Calhern as Winkelreid
- Hugh Herbert as Wise Gai Chow-Chow, the Chinaman
- Edgar Kennedy as Chairman of the Peace Conference
- Richard Carle as Ship's Captain
- William Irving as Schmerzenpuppen
- Neely Edwards as Puppenschmerzen
- Billy Bletcher as Schmerzenschmerzen
- Teddy Hart as Puppenpuppen
- Edward Cooper as Indian Chief
- Dewey Robinson as Luke the Hermit
- Charles Coleman as Marie, Parisian butler
- Grace Hayle as Countess
- Charlie Hall as Shaffner, Winkelreid's valet
- Richard Alexander as Peace Conference Sergeant-at-Arms

== Box office ==
Diplomaniacs was the first Wheeler & Woolsey comedy under the supervision of studio head Merian C. Cooper, who resolved to cut costs during the troubled Depression era. The team's recent comedies Hold 'Em Jail and Girl Crazy had cost $408,000 and $502,000, respectively, under the previous studio head David O. Selznick. In response, Cooper deeply cut the budget for Diplomaniacs to $242,000. According to studio records, the film made a profit of $65,000.
