= Just Imagine (film) =

1930 science fiction musical film

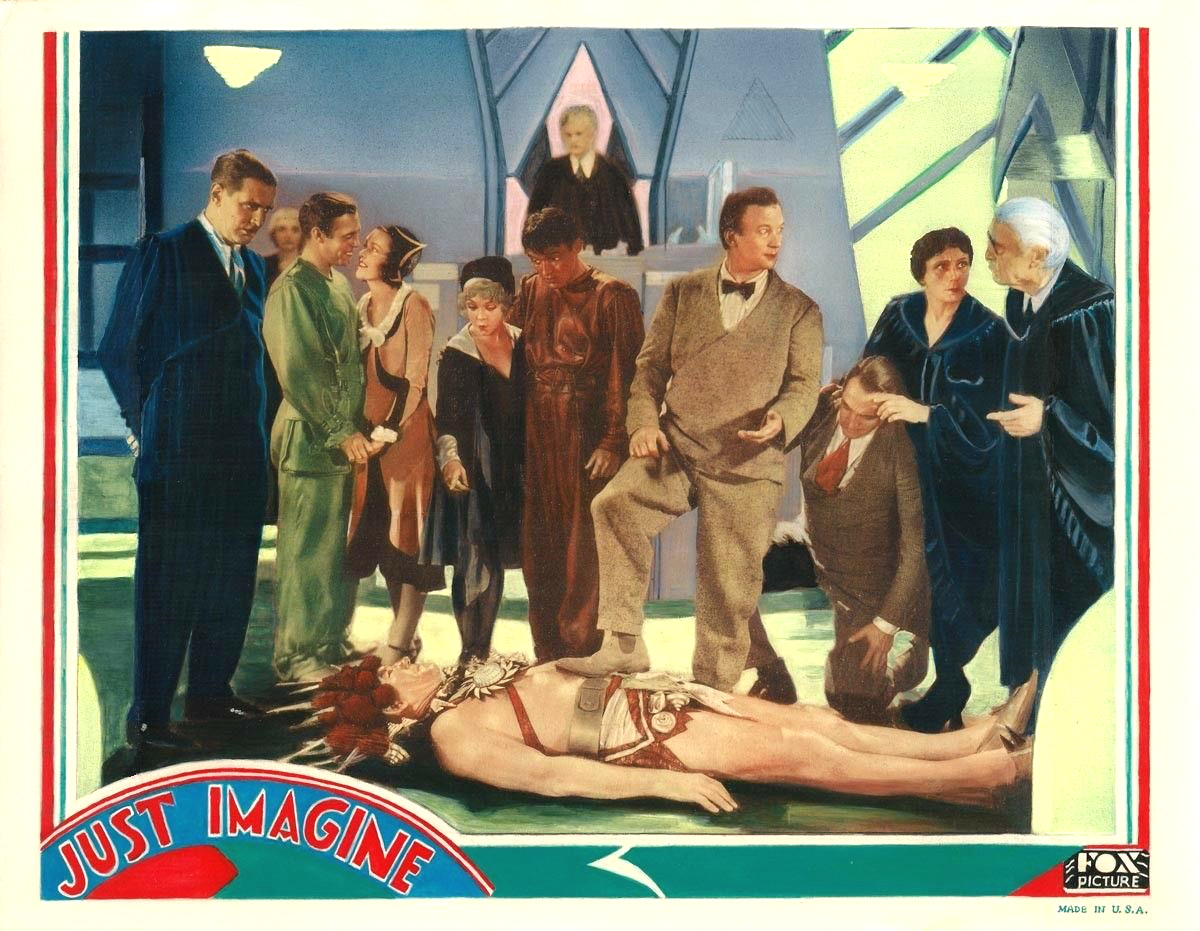
- Lobby card
- Directed by: David Butler
- Written by: Buddy G. DeSylva; Lew Brown; Ray Henderson
- Produced by: Buddy G. DeSylva
- Starring: El Brendel; Maureen O'Sullivan; John Garrick; Marjorie White
- Cinematography: Ernest Palmer
- Edited by: Irene Morra
- Music by: Hugo Friedhofer; Arthur Kay
- Distributed by: Fox Film Corporation
- Release date: November 23, 1930
- Running time: 109 minutes
- Country: United States
- Language: English
- Budget: $1,100,000

Just Imagine is a 1930 American pre-Code science fiction musical-comedy film, directed by David Butler. The film is known for its art direction and special effects in its portrayal of New York City in an imagined 1980. Just Imagine stars El Brendel, Maureen O'Sullivan, John Garrick and Marjorie White. The "man from 1930" was played by El Brendel.

The film starts with a preamble showing life in 1880, where the people believed themselves the "last word in speed". It switches to 1930, with the streets crowded with automobiles and lined with electric lights and telephone wires. It then switches to 1980, where the tenement houses have morphed into 250-story buildings, connected by suspension bridges and multi-lane elevated roads.

== Plot ==
Just Imagine (1930)

In 1980, J-21 sets his aircraft on "hover" mode in New York, lands and converses with the beautiful LN-18. He describes how the marriage tribunal has refused to consider J-21's marital filing and applications, and LN-18 is going to be forced to marry the conceited and mean MT-3. J-21 plans to visit LN-18 that night.

RT-42 tries to cheer him up by taking him to see a horde of surgeons experimentally revive a man from 1930, who was struck by lightning while playing golf, and was killed. The man (originally named Peterson now is called Single O) is taken in hand by RT-42 and J-21, where it is revealed that aircraft have replaced cars, numbers have replaced names, pills have replaced food and liquor, and the only legal babies come from vending machines. That night, LN-18 feigns a headache, and her father and the despicable MT-3 decide to go to "the show" without her. The second they are gone, RT-42 and J-21 appear and woo D-6 and LN-18 respectively. MT-3 and LN-18's father return quite early, as MT-3 was highly suspicious, and RT-42 and J-21 hide. However, the game is foiled by the moronic Single O (El Brendel), the man from 1930, becoming addicted to pill-highballs, getting drunk, and trying to get some more pill-highballs from J-21.

J-21 is depressed, but is contacted by Z-4, the scientist. He is told that Z-4 has built a "rocket plane" that can carry three men to Mars. After a farewell party where J-21 works, on the Pegasus, a dirigible they call an "air-liner," the rocket blasts off, carrying J-21, RT-42 and Single O, who has stowed away for the synthetic rum. Landing on Mars, they are received by the Queen, Looloo and the King, Loko. That night, Looloo and Loko take them to see a "show," a Martian opera, where a horde of trained Martian ourang-outangs dance about. They are suddenly attacked by Booboo and Boko, the evil twins (everyone on Mars is a twin) of the King and Queen. They escape and return to Earth, and as one of the first men on another planet, J-21 is permitted to marry LN-18. Finally, Single O is reunited with his aged son, Axel.

== Cast ==
- El Brendel as Single O
- Maureen O'Sullivan as LN-18
- John Garrick as J-21
- Marjorie White as D-6
- Frank Albertson as RT-42
- Hobart Bosworth as Z-4
- Kenneth Thomson as MT-3
- Mischa Auer as B-36
- Ivan Linow as Loko/Boko
- Joyzelle Joyner as Loo Loo and Boo Boo
- Wilfred Lucas as X-10
- Mary Carr as Little Old Lady
- Heinie Conklin as Drunk in 1880 Sequence
- Sidney De Gray as AK-44
- Joseph W. Girard as Commander
- George Irving as Head of Marriage Tribunal
- J.M. Kerrigan as Traffic Policeman in 1980
- Vera Lewis as 1980 Census Taker

== Production ==
=== Art/cinematography ===
The massive, distinctive Art Deco cityscape, for which Just Imagine has come to be best remembered, was built in a former Army balloon hangar by a team of 205 technicians over a five-month period. The giant miniature cost $168,000 to build and was wired with 15,000 miniature lightbulbs (an additional 74 arc lights were used to light the city from above); other production credits include costumes by Alice O'Neil, Sophie Wachner, and Dolly Tree.

=== Special effects ===
The sequence in which Single O is revived from the dead features the first screen appearance of the spectacular electrical equipment assembled by Kenneth Strickfaden, seen again and more famously in James Whale's Frankenstein (1931). Over 50 special effects shots combining previously photographed backgrounds with live foreground action were accomplished using the Dunning Process. Rear projection technology of the scale and quality required was not available at the time.

The set design in the form of glass pictures and miniatures was done by Stephen Goosson, Ralph Hammeras, SPFX-guru Willis O'Brien, and Marcel Delgado (all uncredited).

=== Music ===
Of the DeSylva, Brown and Henderson songs introduced in the film, "Never Swat a Fly" was covered as the classic 1930 recording by McKinney's Cotton Pickers, the 1967 revival by Jim Kweskin & The Jug Band, and more recent recordings by Doc Cheatham among others.

== Reception ==
Mordaunt Hall called Just Imagine "clever", "highly imaginative" and "intriguing", and praised the costumes and set design. This expensive film was a one-time-only novelty stunt, bolstered by the short-lived popularity of El Brendel. Wonder Stories "cordially recommended" the film, saying it "shows us many of the wonders that our science fiction authors have been writing about".

Although a box-office flop, it was eventually able to make back some of its production costs by the studio shopping out clips of the futuristic sets for other films of the period. The miniature and full-scale mock-up of the Mars spaceship from this movie were later used in the Universal serial Flash Gordon and its sequels as Dr. Zarkov's spaceship. Also re-used was footage of dancing girls cavorting about and on a Martian idol with moving arms.

By the time Just Imagine was released, movie musicals had greatly declined in popularity. As a result, major American studios would not back another big-budget science fiction film until 1951. There was to be only one other American science-fiction musical in that period, It's Great to Be Alive (1933), which failed at the box-office. Film serials were an exception to this general trend, however.

The first Flash Gordon serial from 1936 had an unusually large budget for a serial of the time, and Gene Autry's The Phantom Empire from 1935 can loosely be considered a science fiction musical serial.

=== Awards ===
Just Imagine was nominated for an Academy Award for Best Art Direction by Stephen Goosson and Ralph Hammeras. It is notable as the first film of the science fiction genre to be nominated for an Oscar.

== See also ==
- List of films set on Mars
