= Sophie Wachner =

American costume designer

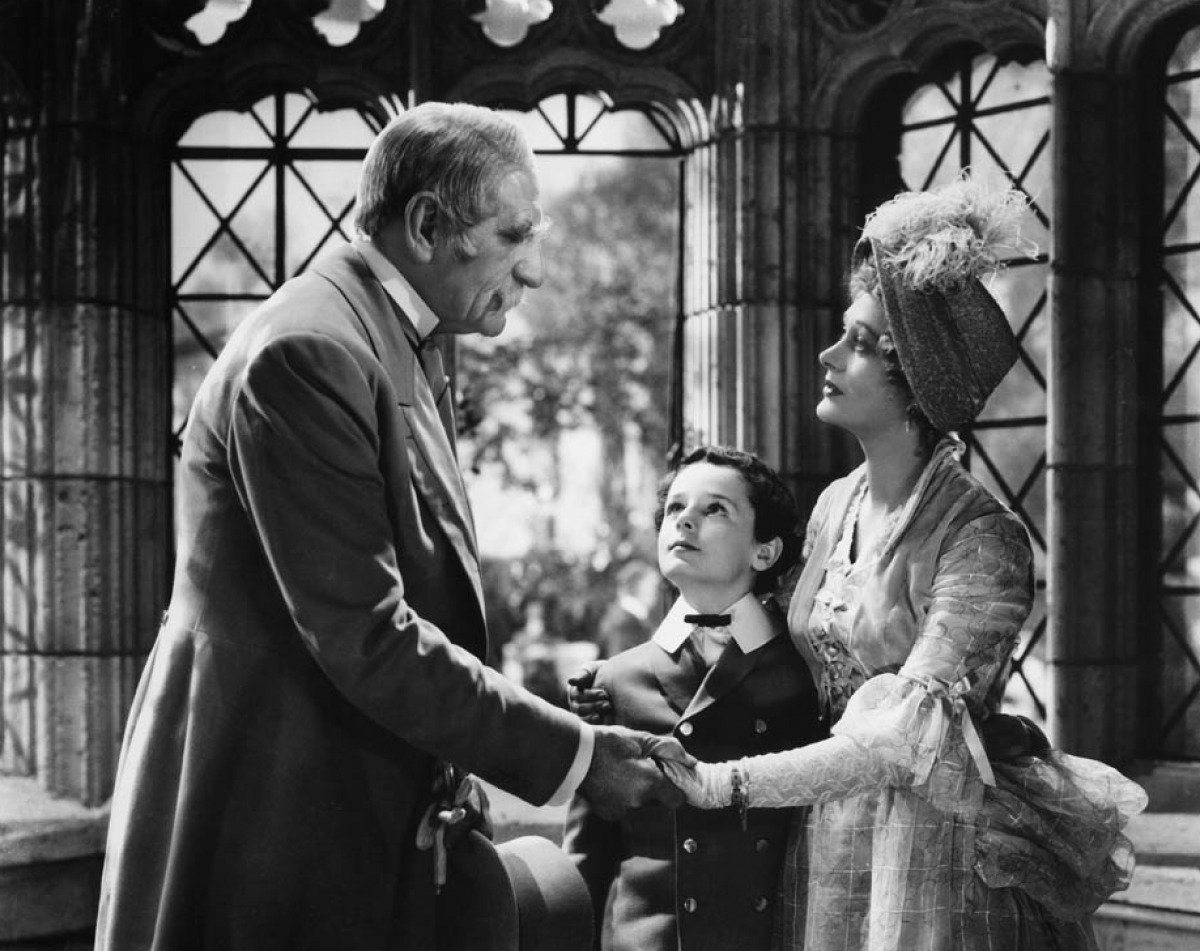
- C. Aubrey Smith, Freddie Bartholomew & Dolores Costello in Little Lord Fauntleroy
- Born: November 5, 1879; Akron, Ohio
- Died: September 13, 1960 (aged 80); Los Angeles, California
- Known for: Costume design
- Notable work: He Who Gets Slapped, Just Imagine, A Connecticut Yankee
- Spouse: Harold Powers (m. 1920; died 1943)

Sophie Wachner (November 5, 1879 – September 13, 1960) was an American costumer who designed costumes for Metro-Goldwyn-Mayer, Fox, and Selznick International Pictures in the early 20th century. Her work appeared in films such as Just Imagine, A Connecticut Yankee, and Little Lord Fauntleroy.

== Early life ==
Wachner was born in 1879 in Akron, Ohio, to Jewish immigrant parents from Hungary. She first began a career in teaching in Akron Public Schools, but in 1909 moved to New York City to design costumes on Broadway. She and her aunt, Frederica De Wolfe, spent ten years there, and during this time Wachner worked as a costumer for Florenz Ziegfeld Jr. In 1919, she moved to Los Angeles to work for Goldwyn Studios.

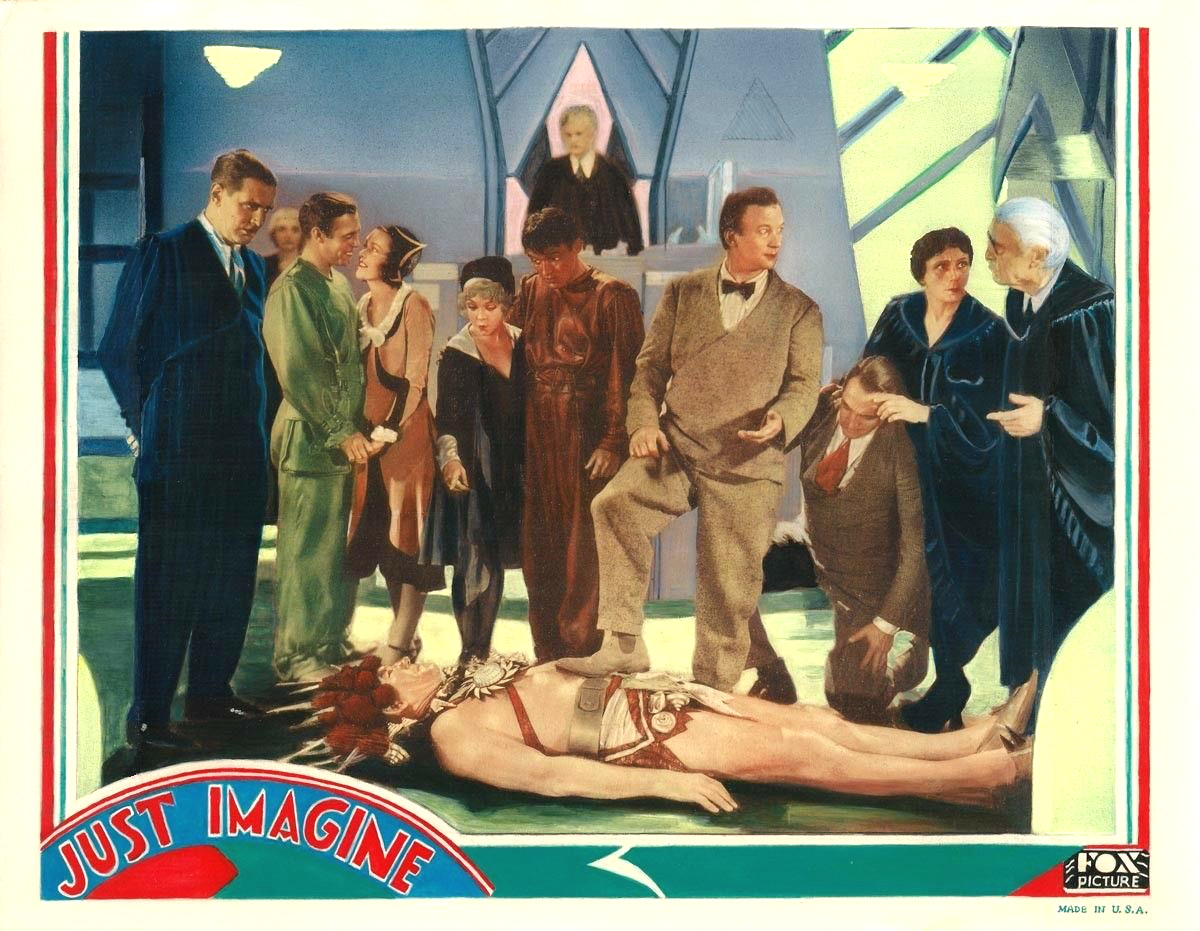
The lobby card for the film Just Imagine, showing the costumes Wachner designed.

== Career ==
Wachner joined Goldwyn Studios in August 1919, as they set up a new headquarters for their costume department. Wachner was well known among the Los Angeles clothiers who supplied Goldwyn Studios' productions. While employed there, Wachner's opinion was greatly respected by the actors and directors she worked with, who "court[ed] her favor exactly as they court the favor of the public". William Wellman and G. B. Manly gave her the nickname 'Colonel Wachner'. Her early work for Goldwyn included costumes for the Hobart Henley film So This Is Marriage, which included a technicolor sequence depicting the story of Bathsheba and David, and He Who Gets Slapped, a 1924 psychological thriller starring Lon Chaney. For the 1930 film Just Imagine, she collaborated with Alice O'Neill and Dolly Tree to create a wardrobe for futuristic 1980s New Yorkers and Martians. Wachner left Goldwyn Studios for Fox in 1924, and worked there until 1930, when she was fired to cut costs. Wachner worked in Hollywood for over fifteen years, with her final film Little Lord Fauntleroy being released in 1936.

== Filmography ==
Year	Title
1924	Daring Love
1924	He Who Gets Slapped
1924	His Hour
1924	Married Flirts
1924	The Snob
1924	So This Is Marriage
1924	Three Weeks
1924	Wife Of The Centaur
1924	Wild Oranges
1925	The Great Divide
1928	Red Wine
1929	Love, Live And Laugh
1929	Big Time
1929	Fox Movietone Follies Of 1929
1929	Hot For Paris
1929	Married In Hollywood
1929	Nix On Dames
1929	Pleasure Crazed
1929	Seven Faces
1929	A Song Of Kentucky
1929	South Sea Rose
1929	Speakeasy
1929	Sunnyside Up
1929	They Had To See Paris
1929	Thru Different Eyes
1929	Words And Music
1930	El Precio De Un Beso
1930	The Arizona Kid
1930	The Big Party
1930	Born Reckless
1930	Cameo Kirby
1930	City Girl
1930	Common Clay
1930	Crazy That Way
1930	The Dancers
1930	A Devil With Women
1930	Double Cross Roads
1930	Fox Movietone Follies Of 1930
1930	The Golden Calf
1930	Happy Days
1930	High Society Blues
1930	Just Imagine
1930	Last Of The Duanes
1930	Lightnin'
1930	Liliom
1930	The Lone Star Ranger
1930	Man Trouble
1930	Not Damaged
1930	Oh, For A Man
1930	On The Level
1930	On Your Back
1930	The Princess And The Plumber
1930	Renegades
1930	Scotland Yard
1930	So This Is London
1930	Song O' My Heart
1930	Such Men Are Dangerous
1930	Under Suspicion
1930	Up The River
1930	Wild Company
1930	Women Everywhere
1931	Charlie Chan Carries On
1931	Mr. Lemon Of Orange
1931	Young Sinners (1931 film)
1931	Quick Millions
1931	Don't Bet On Women
1931	East Lynne
1931	A Connecticut Yankee
1931	Girls Demand Excitement
1931	Fair Warning
1931	Are You There?
1931	Doctors' Wives
1931	The Man Who Came Back
1931	Once A Sinner
1931	Three Girls Lost
1931	Corsair
1931	Men On Call
1931	Seas Beneath
1931	Six Cylinder Love
1931	Body And Soul
1931	Not Exactly Gentlemen
1931	The Spy
1931	Young As You Feel
1931	Their Mad Moment
1936	Little Lord Fauntleroy
