= Little Lord Fauntleroy (1921 film) =

1921 film

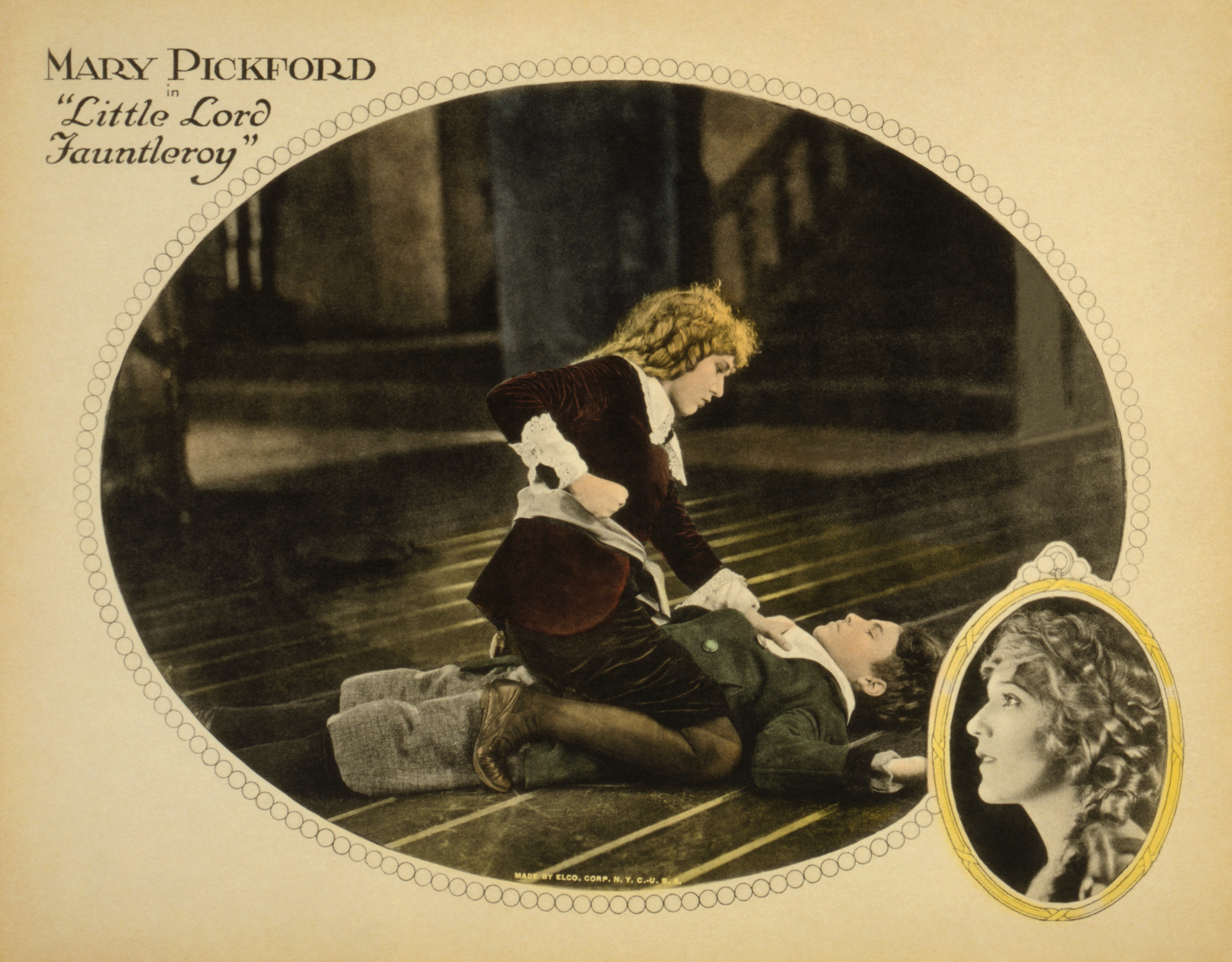
- Lobby card for the film
- Directed by: Alfred E. Green; Jack Pickford
- Written by: Bernard McConville
- Based on: Little Lord Fauntleroy; 1886 novel by Frances Hodgson Burnett
- Produced by: Mary Pickford
- Starring: Mary Pickford
- Cinematography: Charles Rosher
- Music by: Gaylord Carter; Louis F. Gottschalk
- Distributed by: United Artists
- Release date: September 15, 1921
- Running time: 112 minutes
- Country: United States
- Languages: Silent; English intertitles
- Box office: $900,000 (USA)

Little Lord Fauntleroy is a 1921 American silent drama film directed by Alfred E. Green and Jack Pickford and starring the latter's elder sister Mary Pickford as both Cedric Errol and Widow Errol. The film is based on the 1886 novel of the same name by Frances Hodgson Burnett. A statue depicting Pickford's role exists today on the facade of New York City's landmarked I. Miller Building.

== Plot ==
Little Lord Fauntleroy, a novel by Frances Hodgson Burnett, first appeared as a serial in St. Nicholas Magazine in 1885 and was published as a book in 1886. It became a major literary success, shaping both children's fiction and late-Victorian fashion.

The story centers on Cedric Errol, a kind-hearted boy living in poverty in New York City with his widowed mother, whom he calls "Dearest." When his father's older brothers die without heirs, Cedric unexpectedly becomes heir to the Earldom of Dorincourt. His grandfather, the Earl of Dorincourt—a cynical, gout-ridden aristocrat who had disowned Cedric's father for marrying an American—summons the boy to England.

The Earl plans to shape Cedric into a cold nobleman, but the opposite happens: Cedric firmly believes his grandfather is good at heart, and that belief becomes a self-fulfilling prophecy. The boy's unconditional kindness and egalitarian American outlook gradually transform the Earl into a compassionate landlord.

The plot climaxes when an American woman named Minna claims her own son is the true heir. Cedric's old New York friends—Dick the bootblack and Mr. Hobbs the grocer—travel to England and expose her as a fraud. The novel ends with the Earl reconciled with Cedric's mother and a grand celebration of Cedric's eighth birthday.

== Cast ==
- Mary Pickford as Cedric Errol and his mother Mrs. Errol
- Claude Gillingwater as Earl of Dorincourt
- Joseph J. Dowling as William Havisham
- James A. Marcus as Hobbs
- Kate Price as Mrs. McGinty
- Fred Malatesta as Dick
- Rose Dione as Minna
- Arthur Thalasso as The Stranger
- Colin Kenny as Bevis
- Emmett King as Reverend Mr Mordaunt

A young Milton Berle appears in an uncredited role.

== Full movie ==
Little Lord Fauntleroy

== See also ==
- Little Lord Fauntleroy (1936)
- Little Lord Fauntleroy (1980)
