= Mielziner =

Mielziner is a surname. Notable people with the surname include:

- Jo Mielziner (1901–1976), American theatrical scenic, and lighting designer
- Leo Mielziner (1869–1935), American portrait artist, son of Moses
- Moses Mielziner (1828–1903), American Reform rabbi and author
- Saul Mielziner, American football player
