= Minna Gombell =

American actress

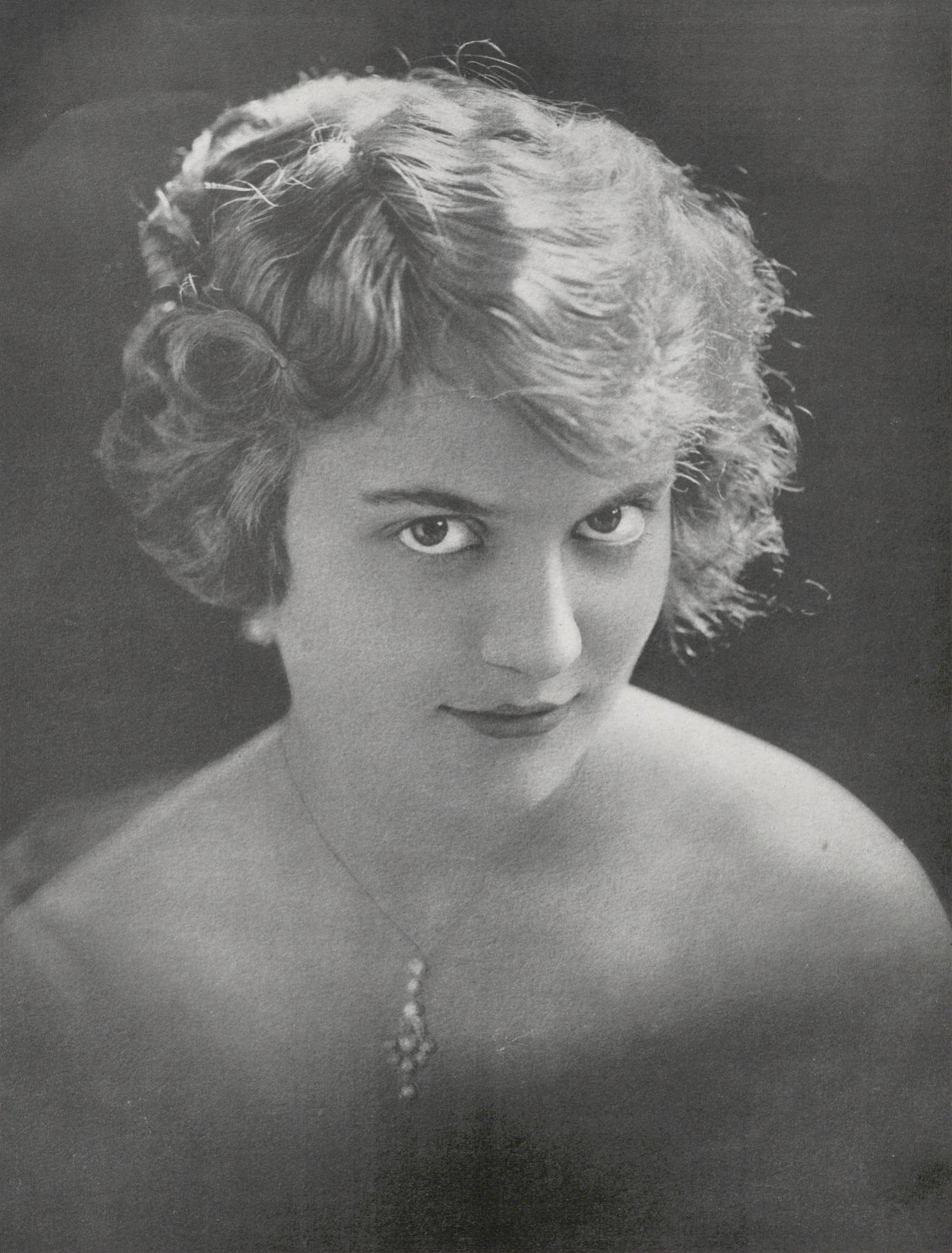
- Gombell in 1917
- Born: Minna Marie Gombel; May 28, 1892; Baltimore, Maryland, U.S.
- Died: April 14, 1973 (aged 80); Santa Monica, California, U.S.
- Other names: Nancy Gardner; Winifred Lee
- Occupation: Actress
- Years active: 1912–1961
- Spouses: Howard C. Rumsey (m. 1916; div. 1921) Ferdinand Eggena (m. 1922; div. 1924) Joseph W. Sefton Jr. (m. 1933; div. 1954)

Minna Marie Gombell (née Gombel; May 28, 1892 – April 14, 1973) was an American stage and film actress.

== Early years ==
She was born Minna Marie Gombel in Baltimore, Maryland, the daughter of William and Emma M. Debring Gombel. Her father was a medical doctor who came to the United States from Germany in 1880. Her mother was from Baltimore and of German descent.

== Life and work ==
Gombell was active in stock theater, starring with troupes in Albany, Atlanta, Cleveland, New Orleans, and Los Angeles. Her Broadway credits include Indiscretion (1928), The Great Power (1928), Ballyhoo (1926), Alloy (1924), Mr. Pitt (1923), Listening in (1922), On the Hiring Line (1919), The Indestructible Wife (1917), Six Months' Option (1917), and My Lady's Garter (1915).

She had a successful stage career from 1912 as Winifred Lee before being signed by the Fox Film Corporation in the late 1920s. Her first film was Doctors' Wives (1931) in which she played under the name Nancy Gardner, a name given to her by Fox. After this, she spent a time coaching several young actresses before returning to film under her real name.

She appeared in some fifty Hollywood films including: Block-Heads (as the dominant wife of Oliver Hardy), The Merry Widow, The First Year, Boom Town, High Sierra, Hoop-La, The Thin Man, Doomed Caravan, and The Best Years of Our Lives.

== Personal life ==
Gombell married Howard Chesham Rumsey on March 9, 1916, in New York City. They divorced in 1921. In 1922 she was married in secret to the aviator and press agent Ferdinand Eggena in Atlanta, Georgia. Their marriage was revealed when he was arrested for fraud in November. She filed for divorce the next month, which was granted in 1924. On May 19, 1933, she was married for a third time to millionaire banker Joseph W. Sefton Jr. They separated in 1947 and were divorced in 1954.

Some sources state she was married to writer/producer Myron C. Fagan, who put Gombell in several plays and films in the 1920s, but Fagan was married during this period to another woman, who died in 1966.

Gombell died in Santa Monica on April 14, 1973, and was buried in Loudon Park Cemetery in Baltimore, Maryland.

== Partial filmography ==
| Year | Film | Role | Director | Notes |
|---|---|---|---|---|
| 1929 | The Great Power | Joan Wray | | |
| 1931 | Doctors' Wives | Julia Wyndram | Frank Borzage | |
| 1931 | Bad Girl | Edna Driggs | Frank Borzage | |
| 1931 | Skyline | Minor Role | Sam Taylor | uncredited |
| 1931 | Sob Sister | Vonnie | Alfred Santell | |
| 1931 | Good Sport | Virginia Casey | Kenneth MacKenna | |
| 1932 | The Rainbow Trail | Ruth | David Howard | |
| 1932 | Stepping Sisters | Rosie La Marr | Seymour Felix | |
| 1932 | Dance Team | Cora Stuart | Sidney Lanfield | |
| 1932 | After Tomorrow | Else Taylor | Frank Borzage | |
| 1932 | Careless Lady | Yvette Logan | Kenneth MacKenna | |
| 1932 | Bachelor's Affairs | Stella Peck | Alfred L. Werker | |
| 1932 | The First Year | Mrs. Barstow | William K. Howard | |
| 1932 | Wild Girl | Millie | Raoul Walsh | |
| 1933 | Pleasure Cruise | Judy Mills | Frank Tuttle | |
| 1933 | Hello, Sister! | Mona La Rue | | |
| 1933 | What Price Innocence? | Amy Harper | Willard Mack | |
| 1933 | The Big Brain | Margy | George Archainbaud | |
| 1933 | Wild Boys of the Road | Aunt Carrie | William Wellman | |
| 1933 | The Way to Love | Suzanne | Norman Taurog | |
| 1933 | Hoop-La | Carrie | Frank Lloyd | |
| 1934 | Cross Country Cruise | Nita Borden | Edward Buzzell | |
| 1934 | Keep 'Em Rolling | Julie | Argyle Nelson (assistant) | |
| 1934 | Marrying Widows | The Press Agent | Sam Newfield | |
| 1934 | No More Women | Annie Fay | Albert S. Rogell | |
| 1934 | Registered Nurse | Beulah Schloss | Robert Florey | |
| 1934 | Strictly Dynamite | Miss LaSeur | Elliott Nugent (unbilled) | |
| 1934 | The Thin Man | Mimi Wynant Jorgenson | W. S. Van Dyke | |
| 1934 | The Hell Cat | Pauline McCoy | Albert S. Rogell | |
| 1934 | The Lemon Drop Kid | Maizie | Marshall Neilan | |
| 1934 | The Merry Widow | Marcelle | Ernst Lubitsch | |
| 1934 | Cheating Cheaters | Nell Brockton | Richard Thorpe | |
| 1934 | Babbitt | Zilla Reisling | William Keighley | |
| 1935 | The White Cockatoo | Grete Lovscheim | Alan Crosland | |
| 1935 | Women Must Dress | Linda Howard | Reginald Barker | |
| 1935 | Two Sinners | Mrs. Pym | Arthur Lubin | |
| 1935 | Miss Pacific Fleet | Sadie Freytag | Ray Enright | |
| 1936 | Champagne Charlie | Lillian Wayne | James Tinling | |
| 1936 | Banjo on my Knee | Ruby | John Cromwell | |
| 1937 | Make Way for Tomorrow | Nellie Chase | Leo McCarey | |
| 1937 | Slave Ship | Mabel | Tay Garnett | |
| 1937 | Wife, Doctor and Nurse | Constance | Walter Lang | |
| 1938 | Block-Heads | Mrs. Hardy | John G. Blystone | |
| 1938 | The Great Waltz | Mrs. Hofbauer | Josef von Sternberg (uncredited) | |
| 1938 | Comet Over Broadway | Tim Adams | John Farrow (uncredited) | |
| 1938 | Going Places | Cora Withering | Ray Enright | |
| 1939 | Second Fiddle | Jenny | Sidney Lanfield | |
| 1939 | Stop, Look and Love | Emma Haller | Otto Brower | |
| 1939 | The Hunchback of Notre Dame | Queen of Beggars | William Dieterle | |
| 1940 | Boom Town | Spanish Eva | Jack Conway | |
| 1941 | Doomed Caravan | Jane Travers | Lesley Selander | |
| 1941 | High Sierra | Mrs. Baughmam | Raoul Walsh | |
| 1941 | Thieves Fall Out | Ella Barnes | Ray Enright | |
| 1942 | Cadets on Parade | Della | Lew Landers | |
| 1942 | Mexican Spitfire Sees a Ghost | Edith Fitzbadden | Leslie Goodwins | |
| 1943 | Salute for Three | Myrt | Ralph Murphy | |
| 1944 | Chip Off the Old Block | Milly | Charles Lamont | |
| 1944 | Johnny Doesn't Live Here Any More | Mrs. Collins | Joe May | |
| 1944 | The Town Went Wild | Marian Harrison | Ralph Murphy | |
| 1944 | Destiny | Marie | Julien Duvivier (uncredited) | |
| 1945 | Night Club Girl | Rita | Edward F. Cline | |
| 1945 | Penthouse Rhythm | Taffy | Edward F. Cline | |
| 1945 | Swingin' on a Rainbow | Minnie Regan | William Beaudine | |
| 1945 | Sunbonnet Sue | Mrs. Fitzgerald | Ralph Murphy | |
| 1945 | Man Alive | Aunt Sophie | Ray Enright | |
| 1946 | Perilous Holiday | Mrs. Latham | Edward H. Griffith | |
| 1946 | The Best Years of Our Lives | Mrs. Parrish | William Wyler | |
| 1947 | Wyoming | Queenie Lassiter | Joseph Kane | |
| 1948 | Mr. Reckless | Ma Hawkins | Frank McDonald | |
| 1948 | Return of the Bad Men | Emily | Ray Enright | |
| 1948 | The Snake Pit | Miss Hart | Anatole Litvak | |
| 1949 | The Last Bandit | Winnie McPhail | Joseph Kane | |
| 1950 | Pagan Love Song | Kate Bennett | Robert Alton | |
| 1951 | Here Comes the Groom | Mrs. Godfrey | Frank Capra | |
| 1951 | I'll See You in My Dreams | Mrs. LeBoy | Michael Curtiz | final film role |
