= A Pretty Girl Is Like a Melody =

1919 song by Irving Berlin

Single by John Steel
- B-side: "Tulip Time"
- Written: 1919
- Published: 1919
- Released: September 1919
- Recorded: June 30, 1919
- Genre: Traditional pop
- Label: Victor
- Songwriter: Irving Berlin

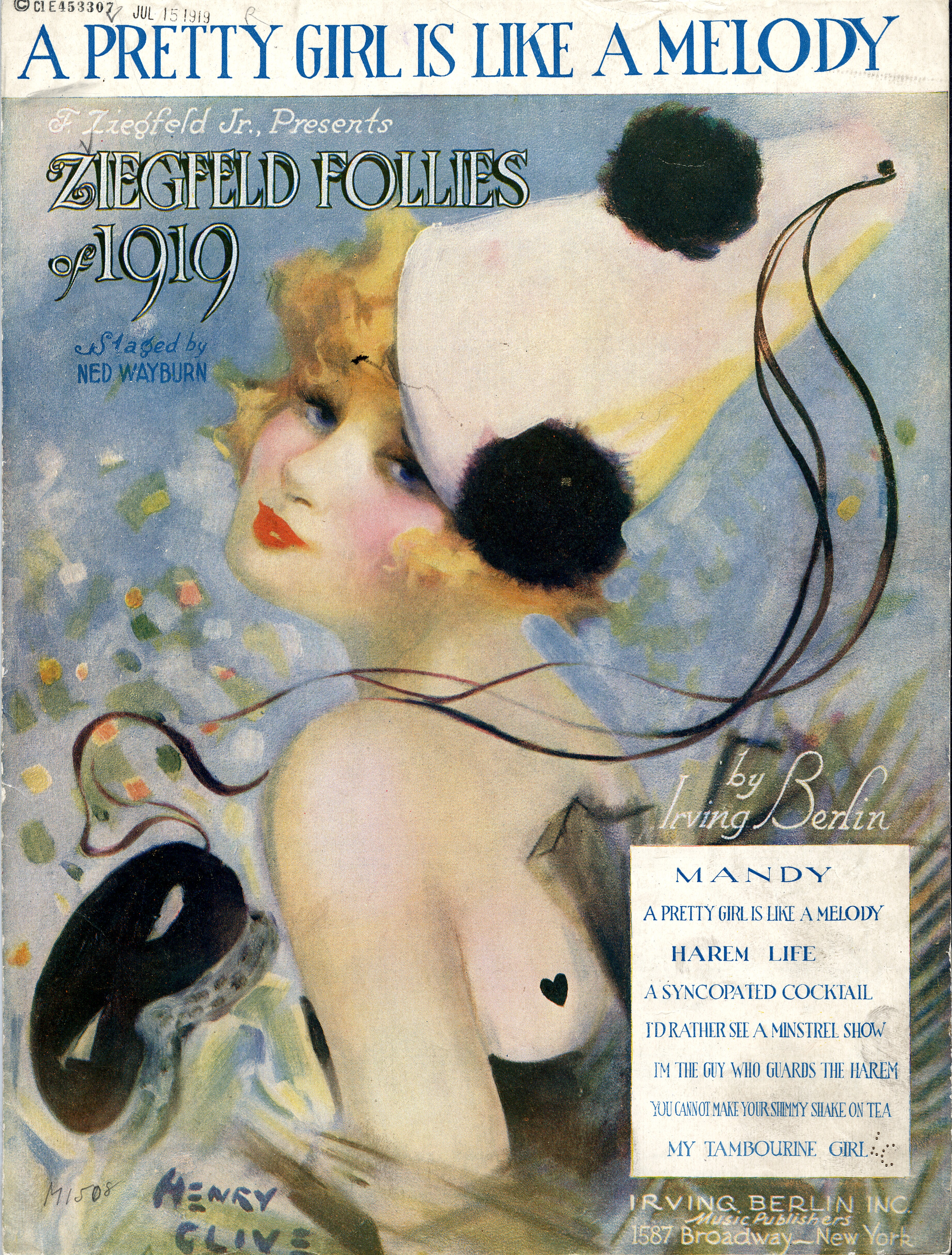
Sheet music cover

"A Pretty Girl Is Like A Melody" is a popular song written by Irving Berlin in 1919 which became the theme song of the Ziegfeld Follies. The first verse and refrain are considered part of the Great American Songbook and are often covered as a jazz standard.

== Song ==
The portion of the song composed entirely by Berlin and published as sheet music contained the first verse and refrain of the original stage number. The refrain begins, "A pretty girl is like a melody / That haunts you night and day", a summary of the song's extended simile. The refrain is better known than the introductory verse, which critic Josh Rubins called "mercifully little-known".

=== Later verses ===
The later verses from the original 1919 stage show were patter lyrics by Berlin to the air of classical tunes; this was a common Tin Pan Alley trick. These verses were comical vignettes of the singer's past trysts, successful or otherwise. Their lyrics were long believed lost, but survived in the show's unpublished script, and were also recalled by cast member Doris Eaton Travis (1904–2010). The source music was:

| Composer | Piece |
|---|---|
| Antonín Dvořák | Humoresque op.101 no.7 |
| Felix Mendelssohn | "Spring Song" op.62, no.6 |
| Jules Massenet | "Elegy" from Les Érinnyes |
| Jacques Offenbach | Barcarolle from The Tales of Hoffmann |
| Franz Schubert | "Serenade" from Schwanengesang |
| Robert Schumann | "Träumerei" from Kinderszenen |

Magee concludes, from Travis' lack of memory of the Träumerei, that it was dropped from the number during rehearsals.

== Ziegfeld Follies ==
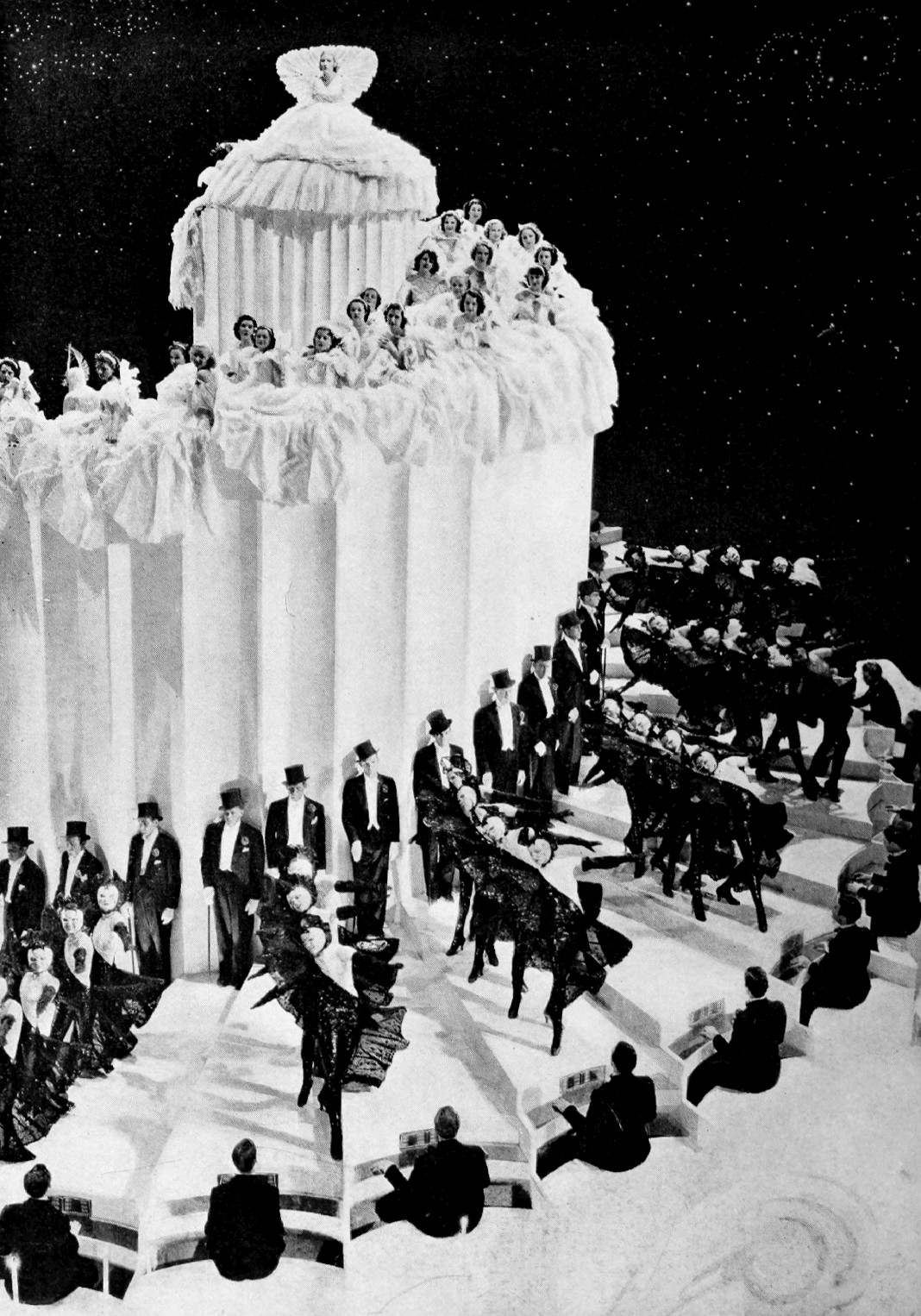
Seymour Felix won the Academy Award for Best Dance Direction for a spectacular production of the song in The Great Ziegfeld (MGM, 1936)

Berlin had agreed with Florenz Ziegfeld to write one act of the 1919 follies, including a "Ziegfeld Girl number" to showcase the showgirls. He first conceived of the classical portion, to match costumes the girls would be wearing. He needed a framing device for the entire sequence, and so subsequently wrote the initial verse and refrain which would become famous.

In the 1919 Follies, the song was sung by the tenor John Steel. He sang the first verse and chorus alone on stage; then each of the remaining five verses while a showgirl sashayed by in costume appropriate to the quoted air. The final refrain saw Steel surrounded by all five beauties. This format was the template for similar numbers in many musical revues of subsequent decades.

"A Pretty Girl Is Like A Melody" was the hit song of that year's Follies, and became the theme song for all later Follies.

In the 1936 film The Great Ziegfeld, the song was the centerpiece musical number performed on a huge set containing a spiral staircase, which has been compared to a wedding cake or "giant meringue". The scene reworked the original stage number on a far grander scale, with many dancers in various period costumes and a wide array of classical music references. The scene became famous and was included in the 1974 anthology film That's Entertainment!

== Later versions and recordings ==
"An Experiment in Modern Music", the 1924 concert where George Gershwin's Rhapsody in Blue premiered, also featured a "Semi-Symphonic Arrangement of Popular Melodies", combining three Berlin tunes: "Alexander's Ragtime Band", "A Pretty Girl Is Like A Melody" and "Orange Blossoms in CA".

The song was used frequently in the annual Miss America pageant prior to 1955, when "There She Is, Miss America" by Bernie Wayne became its new theme song. In 1963, Tom Prideaux wrote in Life magazine that the song "has been played ever since [1919] for God knows how many beauty contests, debutante cotillions and strip-tease acts." It was also often used in catwalk fashion shows.

Fred Astaire danced to the song in the film Blue Skies in 1946. It was the theme song to the 1950s television game show The Big Payoff and "The Dream Girl of 1967" (19 December 1966 – 28 April 1967) on ABC-TV Daytime USA, and it was performed and remade for instrumental by Percy Faith before being replaced by Chuck Barris' New Theme of the show "(The) Hunk O'Love" to the end of the series.

Among the singers who have recorded the song are Pat Boone, Bobby Vinton, Bing Crosby, Vic Damone, Ethel Merman, Rudy Vallée, Bobby Gordon, Frank Sinatra and Judy Garland. Jazz versions have been recorded by musicians including Paul Whiteman, Louis Armstrong, Toots Thielemans, Eddie Heywood, Artie Shaw, George Shearing, Django Reinhardt, Mose Allison, Earl Hines, Coleman Hawkins and Don Byas. A clarinet version performed by Woody Allen with the Preservation Hall Jazz Band is on the soundtrack of his 2000 movie Small Time Crooks.

== Reception and critiques ==
In 1947, Berlin called the song one of his five most important songs structurally, saying he used the "same rhythmic pattern" in other songs. Later he called it "the best individual song written for a musical".

Josh Rubins wrote in 1988 that "'A Pretty Girl Is Like A Melody'—one of Berlin-the-composer's best things—has been seriously damaged by overexposure and insensitive handling". He states that by the 1960s "the song's first four chords devolved into a vaudeville gag: musical shorthand for any reference to overt female sexuality (or transvestism)."

Jeffrey Magee in 2012 argues for a reappraisal in the light of the rediscovered classical verses, writing that "a scene usually understood as an earnest hymn to feminine pulchritude had an unmistakably comic element".

== Allusions ==
Several of Berlin's later Follies songs, including "The Girls of My Dreams" and "Say It With Music", have been described as having been "cloned" from "A Pretty Girl Is Like A Melody".

In the 1960s Mad magazine published a collection of parody lyrics of well-known songs, including "Louella Schwartz Describes Her Malady"; in Irving Berlin et al. v. E.C. Publications, Inc. the United States Court of Appeals for the Second Circuit ruled that this did not violate Berlin's copyright.

Stephen Sondheim wrote the song "Beautiful Girls" from the 1972 stage musical Follies based on this song. In fact, since the musical is supposed to be set on a former theater (based on the Ziegfeld Follies), some of the songs of the show are pastiches of tunes from this same time, written by such composers as Berlin himself, Richard Rodgers, Jerome Kern, Cole Porter, Sigmund Romberg and others.

The album 69 Love Songs includes a song "A Pretty Girl is...", whose final verse begins "A melody is like a pretty girl". The first verse begins "A pretty girl is like a minstrel show". The 1919 Follies' had also featured a song called "I'd Rather See a Minstrel Show".

"A Pretty Boy Is Like a Melody" is an episode of The Brady Brides.
