= Linda Watkins =

American actress (1908–1976)

Linda Watkins Hess
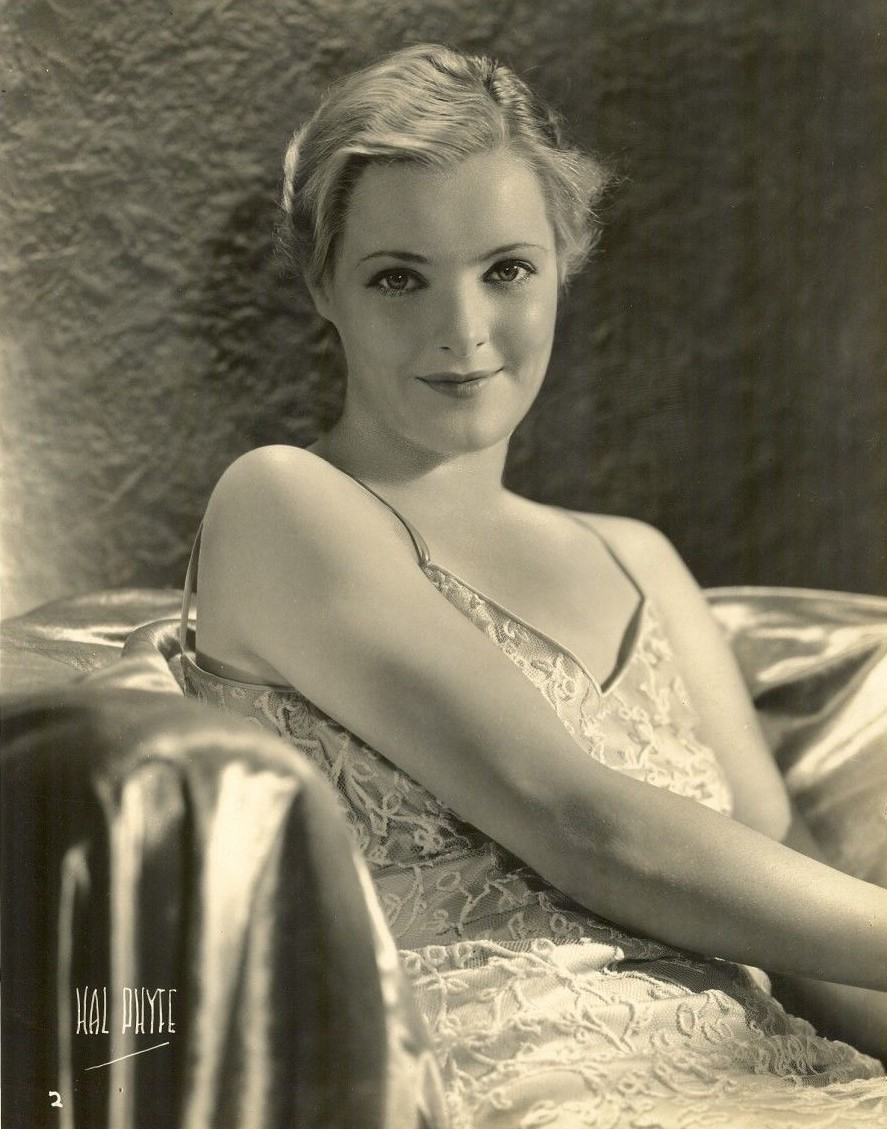
- Watkins in 1931
- Born: Linda Mathews Watkins; May 23, 1908; Boston, Massachusetts, U.S.
- Died: October 31, 1976 (aged 68); Los Angeles, California, U.S.
- Occupation: Actress
- Years active: 1925–1974
- Spouse: Gabriel Hess (m. 1932)
- Children: 1

Linda Mathews Watkins (May 23, 1908 – October 31, 1976) was an American stage, radio, film, and television actress.

== Early life ==
Born in Boston, Massachusetts, as Linda Mathews Watkins, the daughter of Gardiner and Elizabeth R. (née Mathews) Watkins. Her father was active in real estate in Boston. She was related to physicist Albert A. Michelson and painter Arthur Radclyffe Dugmore.

Watkins attended a teachers' college because her parents wanted her to teach. She later studied at the Theatre Guild.

== Career ==
=== Stage ===
After six months, Watkins began to appear with the Theater Guild's summer repertory program in Scarborough, New York. Three weeks after she finished a course at the Theater Guild's Dramatic School, she had the lead in The Devil in the Cheese. The producer was Charles Hopkins.

Watkins gained additional acting experience during a season with the Hartman stock theater company in Columbus, Ohio, after which the Shubert Organization gave her the lead in its Chicago production of Trapped.

Aged 17, she performed in the Tom Cushing comedy The Devil In The Cheese with Fredric March at the Charles Hopkins Theater in New York City. In 1928, she appeared in the Forest Theater production of Trapped by Samuel Shipman. She appeared in a revival of The Wild Duck in November 1928, starred in the George S. Kaufman/Ring Lardner comedy June Moon in 1929, and co-starred with Ralph Morgan in Sweet Stranger in 1930.

=== Film ===
She debuted in movies in Sob Sister (1931), a film in which she plays a female reporter. Reviewer Muriel Babcock remarked that Watkins "is cool, blond, poised, good to look upon. She plays the title role with admirable restraint and gives every evidence of being a comer in films."

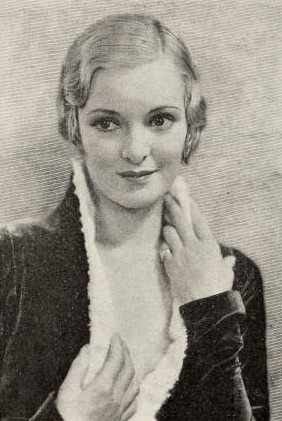
Linda Watkins, 1932.

Her second movie was Good Sport (1931), a screen adaptation of a story by William J. Hurlbut. Produced by the Fox Film Company, Watkins played Marilyn Parker, a naive wife caught up in a love triangle. Her co-stars were Alan Dinehart and John Boles. She appeared in Charlie Chan's Chance, a lost 1932 film starring Warner Oland as the famous detective. Edmund Lowe and Watkins co-starred in Cheaters at Play (1932).

Her other film credits included From Hell It Came (1957), Ten North Frederick (1958), As Young as We Are (1958), Cash McCall (1960), Because They're Young (1960), The Parent Trap (1961), Good Neighbor Sam (1964), Huckleberry Finn (1974), and Bad Ronald (1974).

=== Television ===
Watkins appeared in numerous television broadcasts beginning in 1950 with an episode of The Billy Rose Show. Other television shows appearances include The Adventures of Jim Bowie, Alfred Hitchcock Presents, The Asphalt Jungle, Bonanza, The David Niven Show, Death Valley Days, The Doris Day Show, Gunsmoke (as Mattie in the episode "Miss Kitty" and as Mrs. Dorf in the episode "The Hunger"), Hazel, How to Marry a Millionaire, Ichabod and Me, The Investigators, M Squad, McMillan & Wife, The Munsters, Perry Mason, Peter Gunn, and Wagon Train.

One of her later television roles as a guest star was as Maggie MacKenzie in The Waltons in the episode "The Journey" (1973).

== Personal life ==
Watkins married lawyer Gabriel Lorie Hess, a widower, at the Blackstone Hotel in Chicago on January 28, 1932.

== Death ==
Watkins died in Los Angeles in 1976, aged 68, from undisclosed causes.

== Filmography ==
=== Film ===
Year	Title	Role	Notes
1931	Sob Sister	Jane Ray	
1931	Good Sport	Marilyn Parker	
1932	Charlie Chan's Chance	Gloria Garland	
1932	Cheaters at Play	Tess Boyce	
1932	The Gay Caballero	Ann Grey	
1933	Playthings of Desire	Gloria Dawn	
1957	From Hell It Came	Mrs. Mae Kilgore	
1958	Going Steady	Aunt Lola	
1958	Ten North Frederick	Peg Slattery	
1958	As Young as We Are	Mrs. Hutchins	
1960	Cash McCall	Marie Austen	
1960	Because They're Young	Frances McCalla	
1961	The Parent Trap	Edna Robinson	
1964	Good Neighbor Sam	Edna Bailey	
1974	Huckleberry Finn	Mrs. Grangerford	
1974	Bad Ronald	Mrs. Schumacher	TV movie

=== Television ===
Year	Title	Role	Notes
1950	The Billy Rose Show		Season 1 Episode 4: "Tattle Tale Red"
1957	Wagon Train	Lottie Tarback	Season 1 Episode 5: "The Les Rand Story"
1957	M Squad	Mrs. Gardner	Season 1 Episode 11: "The Alibi Witness"
1957	Alfred Hitchcock Presents	Customer in Bar	Season 3 Episode 2: "Mail Order Prophet"
1958	Alfred Hitchcock Presents	Lila Shank	Season 3 Episode 20: "On the Nose"
1958	The Adventures of Jim Bowie	Ellie Franklin	Season 2 Episode 35: "Bowie's Baby"
1958	How to Marry a Millionaire	Nellie	Season 1 Episode 20: "The Maid"
1959	Perry Mason	Grace Runyan	Season 2 Episode 28: "The Case of the Spanish Cross"
1959	The David Niven Show	Floss	Season 1 Episode 6: "A Day of Small Miracles"
1959-60	Death Valley Days	Hannah; Phoebe Stoner; Kate	Season 2 Episode 7: "One in a Hundred" as Hannah; Season 8 Episode 5: "Fair Exchange" as Phoebe Stoner; Season 8 Episode 26: "The Man Everyone Hated" as Kate
1959-61	Peter Gunn	Louise Sinclair; Laura Mitchell	Season 1 Episode 23: "Dirty Word" as Louise Sinclair; Season 3 Episode 33: "A Bullet for the Boy" as Laura Mitchell
1959-1973	Gunsmoke	Kate; Elsie; Mattie; Mrs. Dorf; Ma; Abby Shadler	Season 4 Episode 23: "Sky" (1959) as Kate; Season 6 Episode 15: "Old Fool" (1960) as Elsie; Season 7 Episode 3 (1961): "Miss Kitty" as Mattie; Season 8 Episode 10: "The Hunger" (1962) as Mrs. Dorf; Season 10 Episode 6: "Take Her, She's Cheap" (1964) as Ma; Season 18 Episode 17: "Shadler" (1973) as Abby Shadler
1961	The Asphalt Jungle	Mrs. Ainslee	Season 1 Episode 1: "The Burglary Ring"
1961	Ichabod and Me	Miss Prouty	Season 1 Episode 10: "Ichabod's Romance"
1961	The Investigators	Madelaine Fowler	Season 1 Episode 12: "Something for Charity"
1963-1964	Hazel	Grace; Gracie	Season 3 Episode 2: "An Example for Hazel" as Grace; Season 3 Episode 18: "Scheherazade and Her Frying Pan: Part 1" as Gracie; Season 3 Episode 19: "Scheherazade and Her Frying Pan: Part 2" as Gracie
1964	The Munsters	Lydia Gardner	Season 1 Episode 10: "Autumn Croakus"
1968	The Doris Day Show	Maggie Wells	Season 1 Episode 11: "The Job"
1971-1972	McMillan & Wife	Emily Hull	recurring role as mother of Sally McMillan (Susan Saint James) in 3 episodes Season 1 Episode 0: "Once Upon a Dead Man"; Season 1 Episode 2: "The Easy Sunday Murder Case"; Season 1 Episode 6: "Till Death Do Us Part"
1973	The Waltons	Maggie MacKenzie	Season 2 Episode 1: "The Journey"

== Sources ==
- Fresno Bee, "Linda Watkins Hinted To Be A Bride", January 27, 1932, pg. 5.
- Los Angeles Times, "Baby Stars Vote Splits Up WAMPAS", August 15, 1931, pg. A1.
- Los Angeles Times, "New Move Marks War On Wampas", August 24, 1931, pg. A1.
- Los Angeles Times, "Studios Place Stars Together", August 29, 1931, pg. 11.
- Los Angeles Times, "Sob Sister Proffered At Loews", October 23, 1931, pg. A11.
- New York Times, "A New Ingenue", January 9, 1927, pg. X4.
- New York Times, "Trapped To Open Aug. 7", July 25, 1928, pg. 13.
- New York Times, "In Sweet Stranger Cast", August 28, 1930, pg. 27.
- New York Times, "The Screen", December 12, 1931, pg. 23.
- New York Times, "Linda Watkins Weds G.L. Hess In Chicago", January 29, 1932, pg. 12.
- Zanesville Register, "Along Broadway", Monday, May 4, 1959, pg. 5.
