= Good Sport =

1931 film

- Directed by: Kenneth MacKenna
- Screenplay by: William Hurlbut
- Produced by: Kenneth MacKenna
- Starring: Linda Watkins; John Boles; Greta Nissen; Minna Gombell; Hedda Hopper; Alan Dinehart
- Cinematography: Charles G. Clarke
- Edited by: Alex Troffey
- Music by: George Lipschultz
- Production company: Fox Film Corporation
- Distributed by: Fox Film Corporation
- Release date: December 13, 1931
- Running time: 67 minutes
- Country: United States
- Language: English

Good Sport is a 1931 American pre-Code comedy film directed by Kenneth MacKenna and written by William Hurlbut. The film stars Linda Watkins, John Boles, Greta Nissen, Minna Gombell, Hedda Hopper and Alan Dinehart. The film was released on December 13, 1931, by Fox Film Corporation.

== Plot ==
When her husband sails for a 3-month business trip in Europe, an unsophisticated wife sublets a Manhattan apartment so she can occupy herself with shopping and the theater. While in the apartment, she discovers that it belongs to her husband's mistress, who has accompanied him to Europe.

== Cast ==
- Linda Watkins as Marilyn Parker
- John Boles as Boyce Cameron
- Greta Nissen as Peggy Bums
- Minna Gombell as Virginia Casey
- Hedda Hopper as Mrs. Atherton
- Alan Dinehart as Rex Parker
- Claire Maynard as Queenie
- Louise Beavers as September
- Sally Blane as Marge
- Betty Francisco as Laura
- Ethel Kenyon as Loretta
- Inez Norton as Nita
- Joan Carr as Violet
- Joyce Compton as Fay
- John T. Murray as Harry Kendricks
- Christine Maple as Party Girl
- Nadine Dore as Party Girl
- Geneva Mitchell as Party Girl
- Eleanor Hunt as Party Girl
