= The Great Ziegfeld =

1936 film by Robert Zigler Leonard

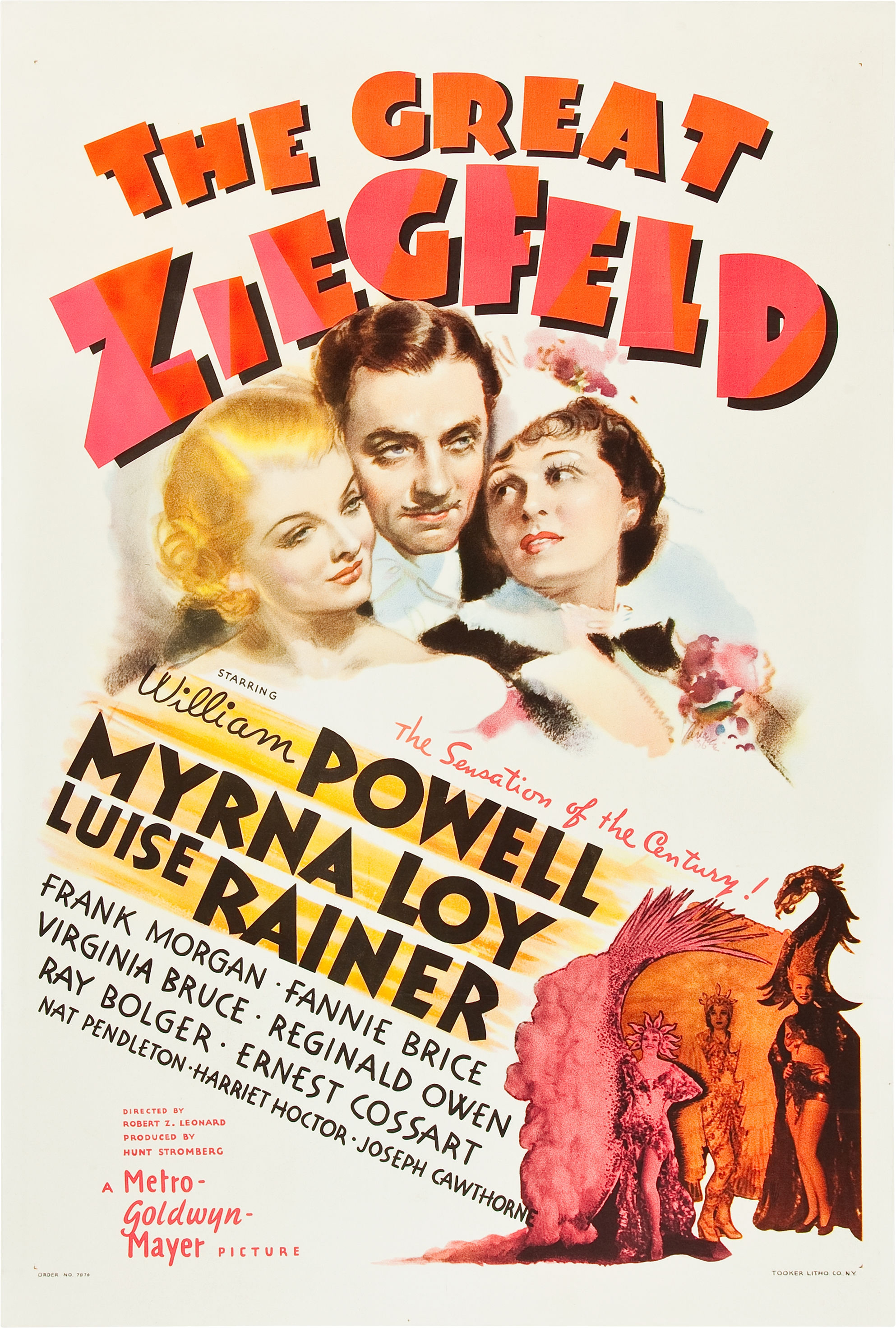
- Theatrical release poster
- Directed by: Robert Z. Leonard
- Written by: William Anthony McGuire
- Produced by: Hunt Stromberg
- Starring: William Powell; Myrna Loy; Luise Rainer
- Cinematography: Oliver T. Marsh
- Edited by: William S. Gray
- Music by: Walter Donaldson; Lyrics: Harold Adamson
- Production company: Metro-Goldwyn-Mayer
- Distributed by: Loew's Inc.
- Release dates: March 22, 1936 (Los Angeles, premiere); April 8, 1936 (US)
- Running time: 177 minutes 185 minutes (roadshow)
- Country: United States
- Language: English
- Budget: $2.2 million
- Box office: $4.7 million

The Great Ziegfeld is a 1936 American musical drama film directed by Robert Z. Leonard and produced by Hunt Stromberg. It stars William Powell as the theatrical impresario Florenz "Flo" Ziegfeld Jr., Luise Rainer as Anna Held, and Myrna Loy as Billie Burke.

The film, shot at Metro-Goldwyn-Mayer studios in Culver City, California in the fall of 1935, is a fictionalized and sanitized tribute to Florenz Ziegfeld Jr. and a cinematic adaptation of Broadway's Ziegfeld Follies, with highly elaborate costumes, dances and sets. Many of the performers of the theatrical Ziegfeld Follies were cast in the film as themselves, including Fanny Brice and Harriet Hoctor, and the real Billie Burke acted as a supervisor for the film. The "A Pretty Girl Is Like a Melody" set alone was reported to have cost US$220,000 (US$5,104,317 in 2025 dollars), featuring a towering rotating volute of 70 ft (21 m) diameter with 175 spiral steps, weighing 100 tons. The music to the film was provided by Walter Donaldson, Irving Berlin, and lyricist Harold Adamson, with choreographed scenes. The extravagant costumes were designed by Adrian, taking some 250 tailors and seamstresses six months to prepare them using 50 pounds (23 kg) of silver sequins and 12 yards (11 m) of white ostrich plumes. Over a thousand people were employed in the production of the film, which required 16 reels of film after the cutting.

One of the biggest successes in film in the 1930s and the pride of MGM at the time, it was acclaimed as the greatest musical biography to be made in Hollywood and still remains a standard in musical film making. It won three Academy Awards, including Best Picture for producer Hunt Stromberg, Best Actress for Luise Rainer, and Best Dance Direction for Seymour Felix, and was nominated for four others.

MGM made two more Ziegfeld films: Ziegfeld Girl (1941), starring James Stewart, Judy Garland, Hedy Lamarr and Lana Turner, which recycled some footage from The Great Ziegfeld; and Ziegfeld Follies (1946) by Vincente Minnelli. In 1951, the studio produced a Technicolor remake of Show Boat, which Ziegfeld had presented as a stage musical.

== Plot ==
The son of a highly respected music professor, Florenz "Flo" Ziegfeld Jr. yearns to make his mark in show business. He begins by promoting Eugen Sandow, the "world's strongest man", at the 1893 Chicago World's Fair, overcoming the competition of rival Jack Billings and his popular attraction, belly dancer Little Egypt, with savvy marketing (allowing women to feel Sandow's muscles).

Ziegfeld returns to his father and young Mary Lou at the Chicago Musical College, and departs to San Francisco, where he and Sandow are deemed frauds for putting on a show in which Sandow faces a lion who falls asleep as soon as it is let out of the cage. Flo travels to England on an ocean liner, where he runs into Billings again who is laughing at a newspaper article denouncing him as a fraud.

Flo discovers that Billings is on his way to sign a contract with beautiful French star Anna Held. Despite losing all his money gambling at Monte Carlo, Flo charms Anna into signing with him instead, pretending that he doesn't know Billings. Anna twice almost sends him away for his rudeness and for being broke, before revealing that she appreciates his honesty. Ziegfeld promises to give her "more publicity than she ever dreams of" and to feature her alongside America's most prominent theatrical performers.

At first, Anna's performance at the Herald Square Theatre is not a success. However, Flo manages to generate publicity by sending 20 gallons of milk to Anna every day for a fictitious milk bath beauty treatment, then refusing to pay the bill. The newspaper stories soon bring the curious to pack his theater, and Ziegfeld introduces eight new performers to back her. Audience members comment on how the milk must make her skin beautiful and the show is a major success. Flo sends Anna flowers and jewelry and a note saying "you were magnificent my wife", and she agrees to marry him, flaunting her new diamonds to her fellow performers.

However, one success is not enough for the showman. He has an idea for a new kind of show featuring a bevy of blondes and brunettes, one that will "glorify" the American girl. The new show, the Ziegfeld Follies, a production filled with women, extravagant costumes and sets, is a success, and is followed by more versions of the Follies.

Ziegfeld tries to make a star out of Audrey Dane, who is plagued with alcoholism, and he lures Fanny Brice from vaudeville, showering both with lavish gifts. He gives stagehand Ray Bolger his break as well. Mary Lou, now a young woman, visits Ziegfeld, who doesn't recognize her initially, and hires her as a dancer.

The new production upsets Anna, who realizes that Flo's world does not revolve around just her, and she becomes envious of the attention he pays to Audrey. She divorces him after walking in on Flo and a drunk Audrey at the wrong moment. Audrey walks out on Flo and the show after an angry confrontation. Broke, Flo borrows money from Billings for a third time for the new show.

Flo meets the red-headed Broadway star Billie Burke and soon marries her. When she hears the news, a heartbroken Anna telephones Flo and pretends to be glad for him. Flo and Billie eventually have a daughter named Patricia.

Flo's new shows are a success, but after a while, the public's taste changes, and people begin to wonder if the times have not passed him by. After a string of negative reviews in the press, Flo overhears three men in a barber's shop saying that he'll "never produce another hit". Stung, he vows to have four hits on Broadway at the same time.

He achieves his goal, with the hits Show Boat (1927), Rio Rita (1927), Whoopee! (1928), and The Three Musketeers, and invests over $1 million (US$18,750,000 in 2025 dollars) of his earnings in the stock market. However, the stock market crash of 1929 bankrupts him, forcing Billie to return to the stage.

Shaken by the reversal of his financial fortunes and the growing popularity of movies over live stage shows, he becomes seriously ill. Billings pays him a friendly visit, and the two men agree to become partners in a new, even grander production of The Ziegfeld Follies. But the reality is that both men are broke and Ziegfeld realizes this. In the final scene in his apartment overlooking the Ziegfeld Theatre, in a half-delirium, he recalls scenes from several of his hits, exclaiming, "I've got to have more steps, higher, higher", before dying in his chair.

== Cast ==
- William Powell as Florenz Ziegfeld Jr.
- Myrna Loy as Billie Burke
- Luise Rainer as Anna Held
- Frank Morgan as Jack Billings
- Fannie Brice as herself
- Virginia Bruce as Audrey Dane
- Reginald Owen as Sampson
- Ray Bolger as himself
- Ernest Cossart as Sidney
- Joseph Cawthorn as Dr. Ziegfeld
- Nat Pendleton as Sandow
- Harriet Hoctor as herself
- Jean Chatburn as Mary Lou
- Robert Greig as Butler
- Herman Bing as Costumer
- Charles Judels as Pierre
- Marcelle Corday as Marie
- Raymond Walburn as Sage
- A. A. Trimble as Will Rogers
- Buddy Doyle as Eddie Cantor
- Mae Questel as Rosie (uncredited)
- William Demarest as Gene Buck (uncredited)
- Edwin Maxwell as Charles Frohman (uncredited)
- Charles Trowbridge as Julian Mitchell (uncredited)

Ziegfeld Girls (uncredited)

- Wanda Allen
- Lynn Bailey
- Monica Bannister
- Bonnie Bannon
- Lynn Bari
- Sheila Browning
- Edna Callahan
- Diane Cook
- Pauline Craig
- Hester Dean
- Susan Fleming
- Virginia Grey
- Mary Halsey
- Jeanne Hart
- Patricia Havens-Monteagle
- Marcia Healy
- Edna Mae Jones
- Mary Lange
- Toni Lanier (Toni Mannix)
- Margaret Lyman
- Frances MacInerney
- Julie Mooney
- Pearlie Norton
- Carlita Orr
- Claire Owen
- Wanda Perry
- Evelyn Randolph
- Pat Ryan
- Georgia Spence
- Venetia Varden
- Dolly Verner

== Gallery of the cast ==
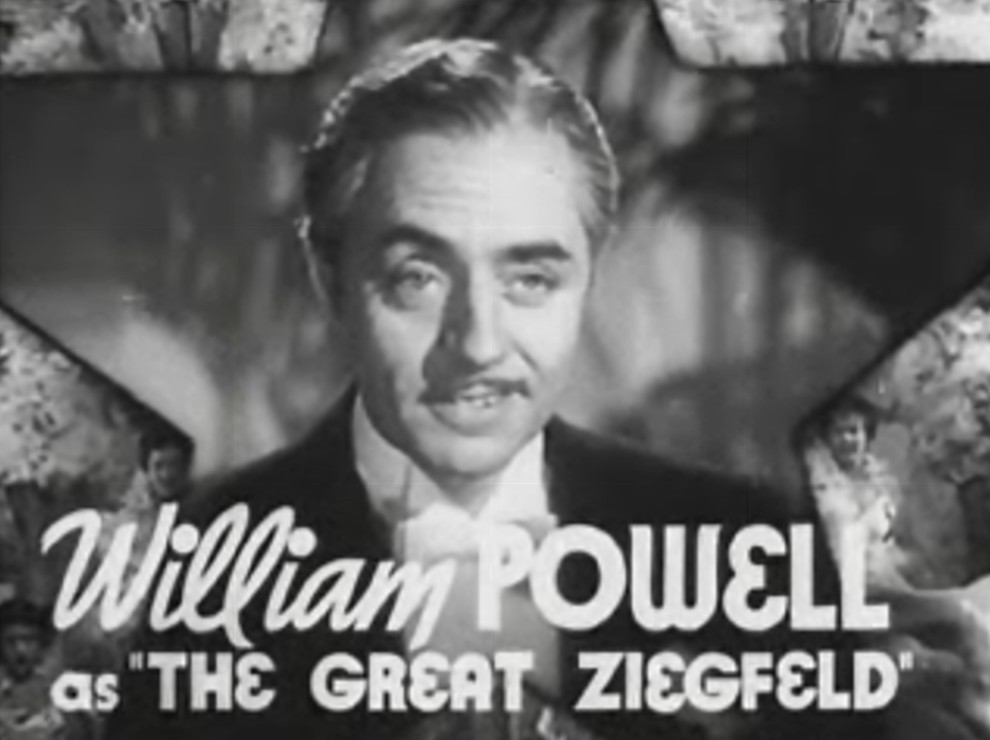
William Powell as Ziegfeld

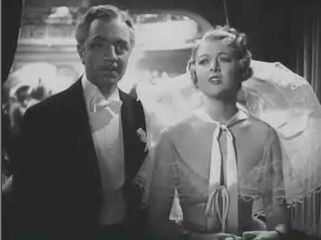
Powell and Myrna Loy as Billie Burke

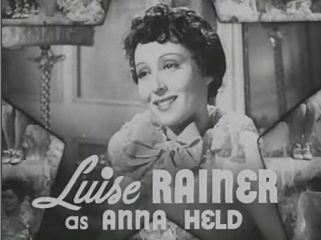
Luise Rainer as Anna Held

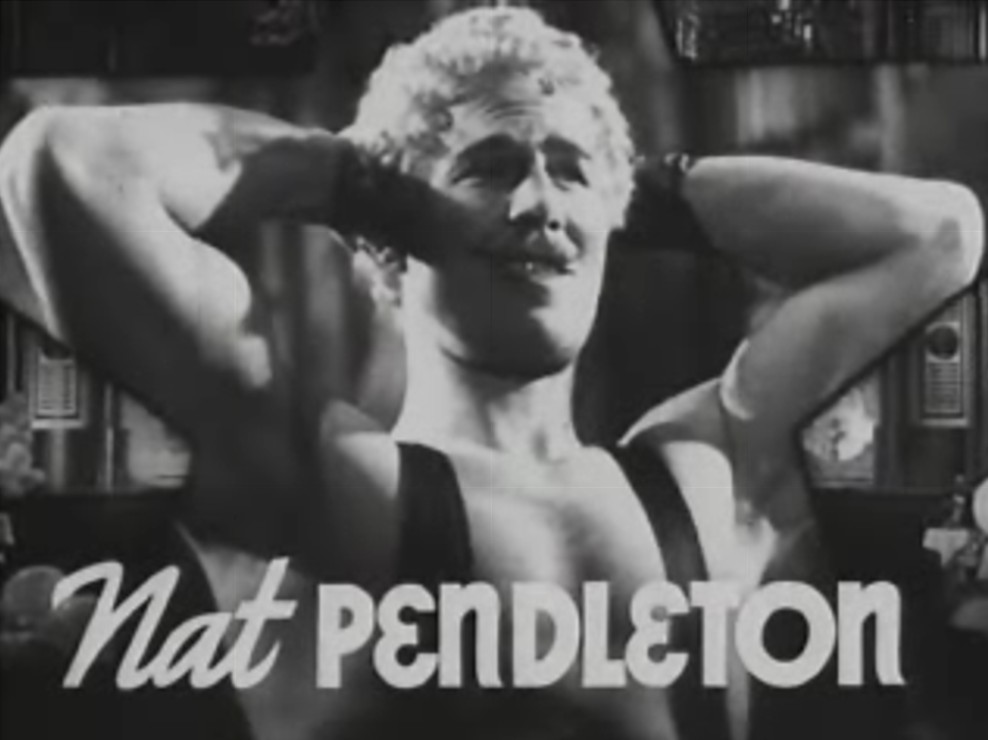
Nat Pendleton as Eugen Sandow

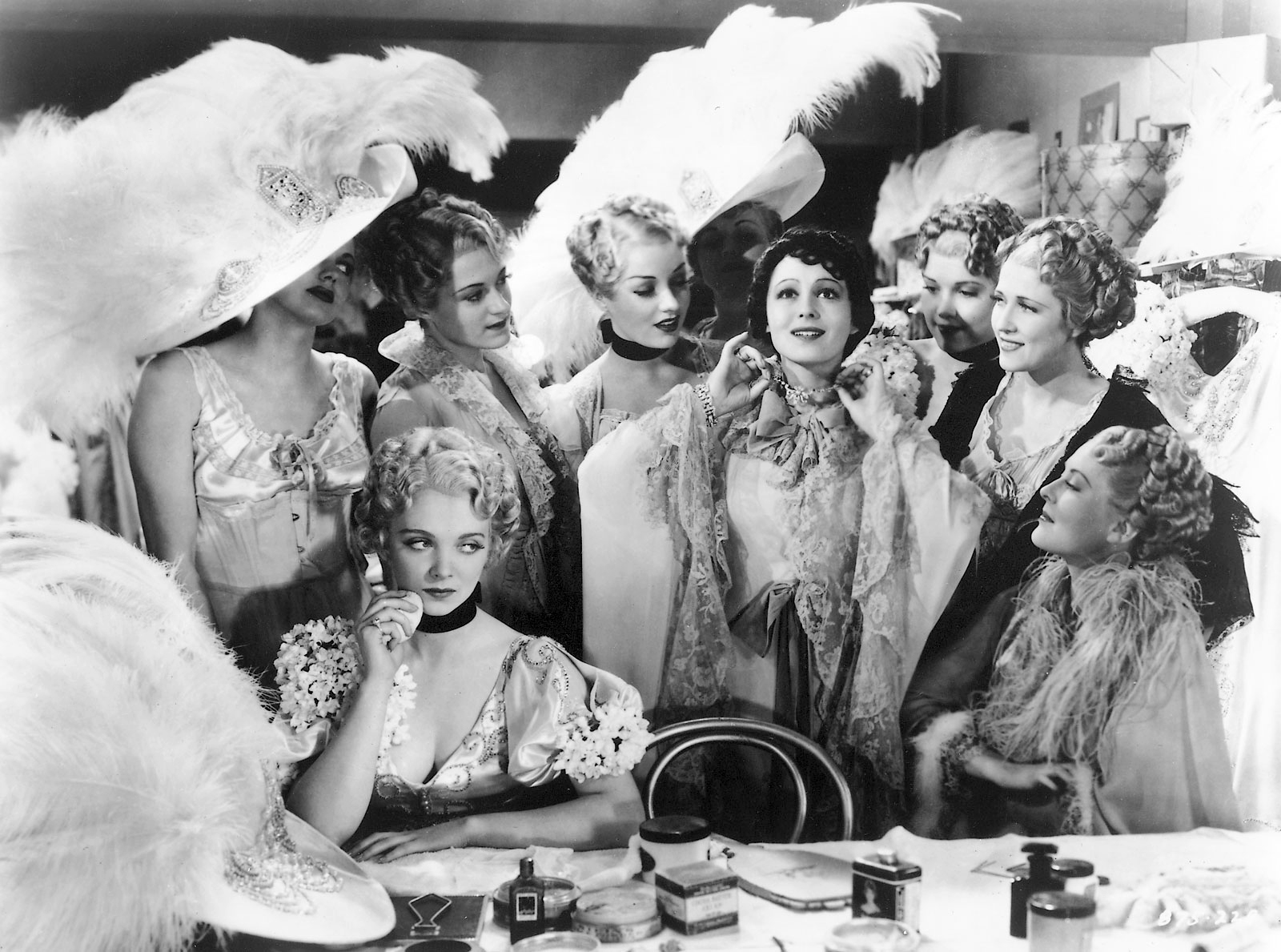
Anna Held (Luise Rainer) shows her jewels to the envious Audrey Dane (Virginia Bruce, seated)

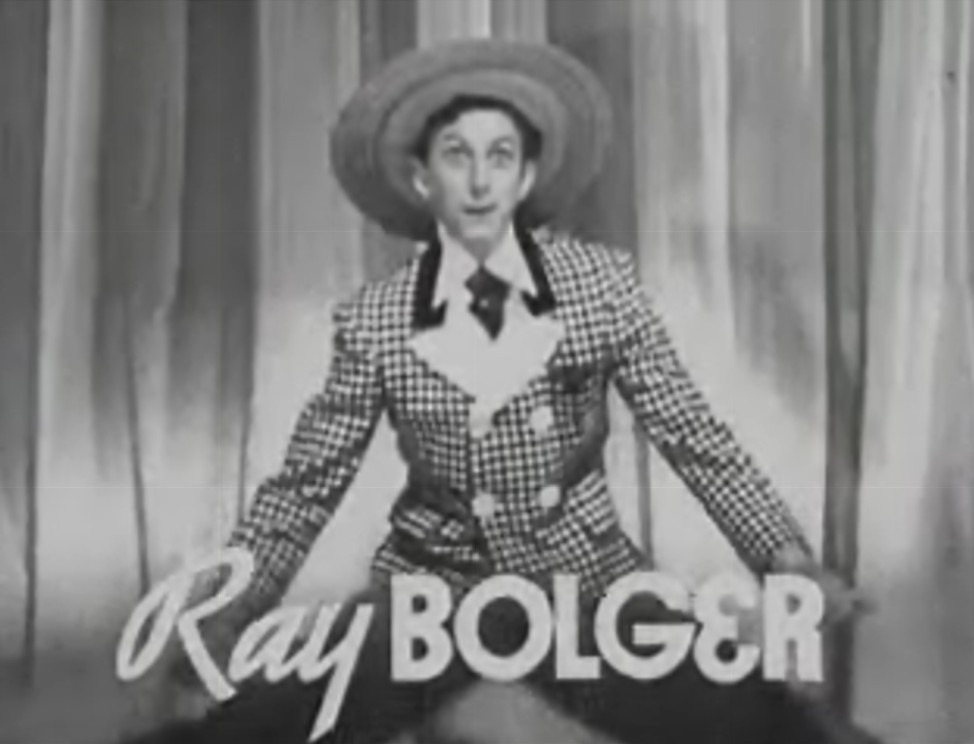
Ray Bolger

== Production ==
Ziegfeld's widow, Billie Burke, was keen to pay off Ziegfeld's debts without filing for bankruptcy, and sold the rights to a biopic of him to Universal Pictures in late 1933. As a result, the film went into the pre-production phase in January 1934. In the early stages of script development, Burke was listed as coauthor with Macguire. Macguire had initially proposed the biographical film to them in the form of a "filmusical entertainment" set in a "theatrical tradition" and William Powell was cast as Ziegfeld. However, by February 1935, Macguire had fallen into disagreement with Universal over financial problems at the studio, and the entire production, including some already constructed sets and musical arrangements, was sold to MGM for US$300,000 (US$7,044,903 in 2025 dollars). As part of the deal however, Universal retained the services of Powell for the classic screwball comedy My Man Godfrey, which was released the same year as The Great Ziegfeld.

The film was shot at MGM Studios in Culver City, California mostly in the latter half of 1935 under a budget of US$1,500,000 (US$35,224,515 in 2025 dollars), produced by Hunt Stromberg. The cost exceeded US$2 million (US$46,966,019 in 2025 dollars) by the end of the production in early 1936, exorbitant for the period, and it was MGM's most expensive film to date after Ben-Hur: A Tale of the Christ (1925). The principal cinematography was shot by Oliver T. Marsh, and George J. Folsey and Karl Freund were brought in to shoot the Ziegfeld Roof numbers. Ray June shot the "Melody" number and Merritt B. Gerstad is credited for the Hoctor Ballet.

In the advertising for the film, MGM boasted of the film's ostentatious nature, bragging that it was "SO BIG that only MGM could handle it", with its "countless beauties, trained lions, ponies, dogs and other animals". Busby Berkeley, who had led Warner Brothers to become the leading producer of musicals in Hollywood in the 1930s, was a major influence on the producers which had "glamorous, excessive 1930s cinematic musical numbers". The film also came at a time when producers had begun seeing the economic and cultural importance of the cinematic medium in comparison to theater. Variety notes that the film producers were likely very concerned with the presentation of the film after production was wrapped up, and that the long length of the film at 176 minutes was understandable in that they probably "wanted to preserve as much footage as possible". William S. Gray was responsible for the editing of the film. Over a thousand people were employed in the production, and The Great Ziegfeld required 16 reels of film after the cutting.

By coincidence, Universal's 1936 film version of the Ziegfeld musical "Show Boat", the most faithful of all the film versions of the stage production, was filmed at the same time as The Great Ziegfeld and released in the same year.

=== Screenplay ===
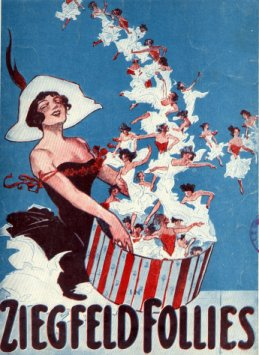
Poster from a 1912 theatrical production of the Ziegfeld Follies

The screenplay by William Anthony McGuire was a "novelty" to many audiences who were familiar with the theatrical Broadway shows of the follies. The script, although fictionalized with embellishments needed for the motion picture, did show some accuracies in the life of Ziegfeld. Frank S. Nugent of The New York Times said of the script: "What William Anthony McGuire has attempted in his screen play, and with general success, is to encompass not merely the fantastic personal history of Ziegfeld but the cross-sectional story of the development of the Follies, the Midnight Frolic on the New Amsterdam Roof and the other theatrical enterprises floated under the Glorifier's aegis during a span of about forty years. The two biographies—of the man and of his creations—are, naturally, inseparable; but both have been told with such wealth of detail and circumstance (real and imaginative) that even the three-hour film narrative is fragmentary and, in some places, confused."

Although it has some accuracies, The Great Ziegfeld takes many key liberties with Ziegfeld's life and the history of the Follies, resulting in many inaccuracies. The earlier scenes with Sandow, the milk bath advertising scenario, and many other sequences including several of the dramatic ups and downs of the film were fictional. George Gershwin's Rhapsody in Blue was never featured in the Follies, and the number "A Pretty Girl Is Like a Melody" was written for the 1919 Follies, not the first edition of the revue, as shown in the film. Ray Bolger was never cast in a "Follies" show, and although she was born in the U.S., Billie Burke grew up in England and spoke with a Mid-Atlantic accent throughout her life; Loy who portrays her clearly has an American accent in the film.

In the film, the last few lines of the song "Ol' Man River" (from Show Boat) are sung by what sounds like a tenor, while the song was intended for bass Paul Robeson and sung in the original production by bass-baritone Jules Bledsoe. Further, the screenplay also gives the impression that the successful original production of Show Boat, which Ziegfeld produced, closed because of the Great Depression. In fact Show Boat ended its original 1927 run in the spring of 1929 and the stock market crash did not occur until October of that year. It was the 1932 revival of the show (also produced by Ziegfeld shortly before his death), not the original production, that was affected by the Depression.

In real life, Ziegfeld did not die in his room at the Hotel Warwick (not mentioned) which stood in front of the Ziegfeld Theatre; he actually died in Los Angeles and had not even spent his last years in New York. However, McGuire did capture a number of Ziegfeld's traits, such as sending telegrams to people even in close proximity, his belief that elephants were a symbol of good luck, his exquisite taste in costumes and design, and perfectionism over his productions, especially lighting and rostrum pedestaling. McGuire's script, now in the Henry E. Huntington Library, San Marino, California, is dated September 21, 1935, probably the date when it was finalized.

=== Casting ===
Initially, the main cast proposed for the film included Marilyn Miller, Gilda Gray, Ann Pennington, and Leon Errol. Featured in the film are William Powell as Ziegfeld, Myrna Loy as Billie Burke, Luise Rainer as Anna Held, Nat Pendleton as Eugen Sandow, and Frank Morgan. Powell admitted to being "amazed" with the film after viewing it and was very grateful at having had the privilege to portray Ziegfeld, considering it to be a very important moment in his career. He said "After seeing this film I can see that most of the characters I have played before were contrived. They had no 'folks', as the character of Ziegfeld had in this picture. Their father was a pen and their mother was a bottle of ink. Here was a character with flesh, blood and sinews. I felt for the first time in my acting career I had tried the full measure of a man, regardless of my shortcomings in playing him."

Many of the performers of the earlier Broadway version of the Ziegfeld Follies were cast in the film as themselves, including Fanny Brice and Harriet Hoctor, the ballet dancer and contortionist. The Great Ziegfeld marked Rainer's second Hollywood film role after Escapade (also with Powell). Fanny Brice appears as a comedian in the abridged song sequence "My Man" and played an effective version of herself in addition to her routine comic role as the funny girl. Nat Pendleton, a freestyle wrestler who had won the silver medal at the 1920 Summer Olympics in Antwerp and had appeared alongside Powell in The Thin Man (1934), was cast as the circus strongman Eugen Sandow.

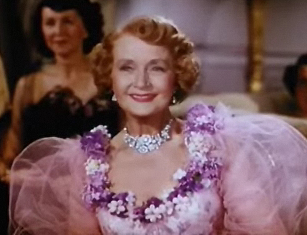
Billie Burke worked as a technical consultant on the film.

Billie Burke objected to her role being cast with another actress (Myrna Loy) since she was also an actress under contract to the studio and could play herself, but the producers concluded that at that point she was not a big enough star to play herself in The Great Ziegfeld. However, according to Emily W. Leider, Burke was not keen on playing her younger self and says that Billie Burke's biographer stated that Miriam Hopkins would have been her first choice to play her part, not Loy. Burke herself worked as technical consultant, and although she did not object to Marilyn Miller performing a number, she was influential in the studio's refusal to give her the higher billing and salary she had demanded, which led to Miller walking away from the film.

Both Miller and Lillian Lorraine threatened legal action if their names were so much as mentioned in the film. Thus Miller's character was renamed Sally Manners, and Lorraine's character was renamed Audrey Dane (played by Virginia Bruce). In real life, Ziegfeld reportedly was obsessed with Miller, and was involved in numerous sex scandals. In 1922, Miller had given an interview in which she accused him of "making love to chorus girls" and sending her a diamond ring as "big as her hand"; this essence of Ziegfeld's character is captured in the film. Incidentally, Miller died from toxicity complications after surgery just before the release of the film on April 7, 1936, which led one reviewer writing in Liberty to denounce an urban legend which had arisen surrounding the timing of her death, writing "It's not true that Marilyn Miller died of a broken heart at not getting the lead in this." Another myth surrounding her untimely death at the age of 37 is that she had contracted syphilis.

Frank Morgan, a stage and film character actor, played the role of promoter Billings in the film. Dennis Morgan, in an uncredited role, performs in "A Pretty Girl Is Like a Melody" (dubbed by Allan Jones). Pat Ryan, the future Pat Nixon, wife of Richard Nixon and First Lady of the United States, was an extra in the film. Will Rogers was to appear in the film, but he was killed in a plane crash in August 1935. He was played by stand-in A.A. Trimble.

=== Costumes ===
The extravagant costumes, which even Ziegfeld initially considered too flamboyant, were designed by Adrian, who had worked with many of the greatest actresses of the period, including Greta Garbo, Norma Shearer, Jeanette MacDonald, Jean Harlow, Katharine Hepburn and Joan Crawford, and later designed for films such as Marie Antoinette (1938), The Women (1939), and The Wizard of Oz (1939). Howard Gutner documents that due to MGM's wealth and the high budget, Adrian indulged in "sheer lavishness" in making the costumes, surpassing anything he had done previously. It took 250 tailors and seamstresses six months to sew the costumes that Adrian had designed for the film, using 50 pounds (23 kg) of silver sequins and 12 yards (11 m) of white ostrich plumes. The costumes worn by women in the film are diverse, varying from "puffy hooped skirts to catlike leotards" to "layers of tulle and chiffron", with the men mostly wearing black tuxedos.

=== Mise en scène and music ===
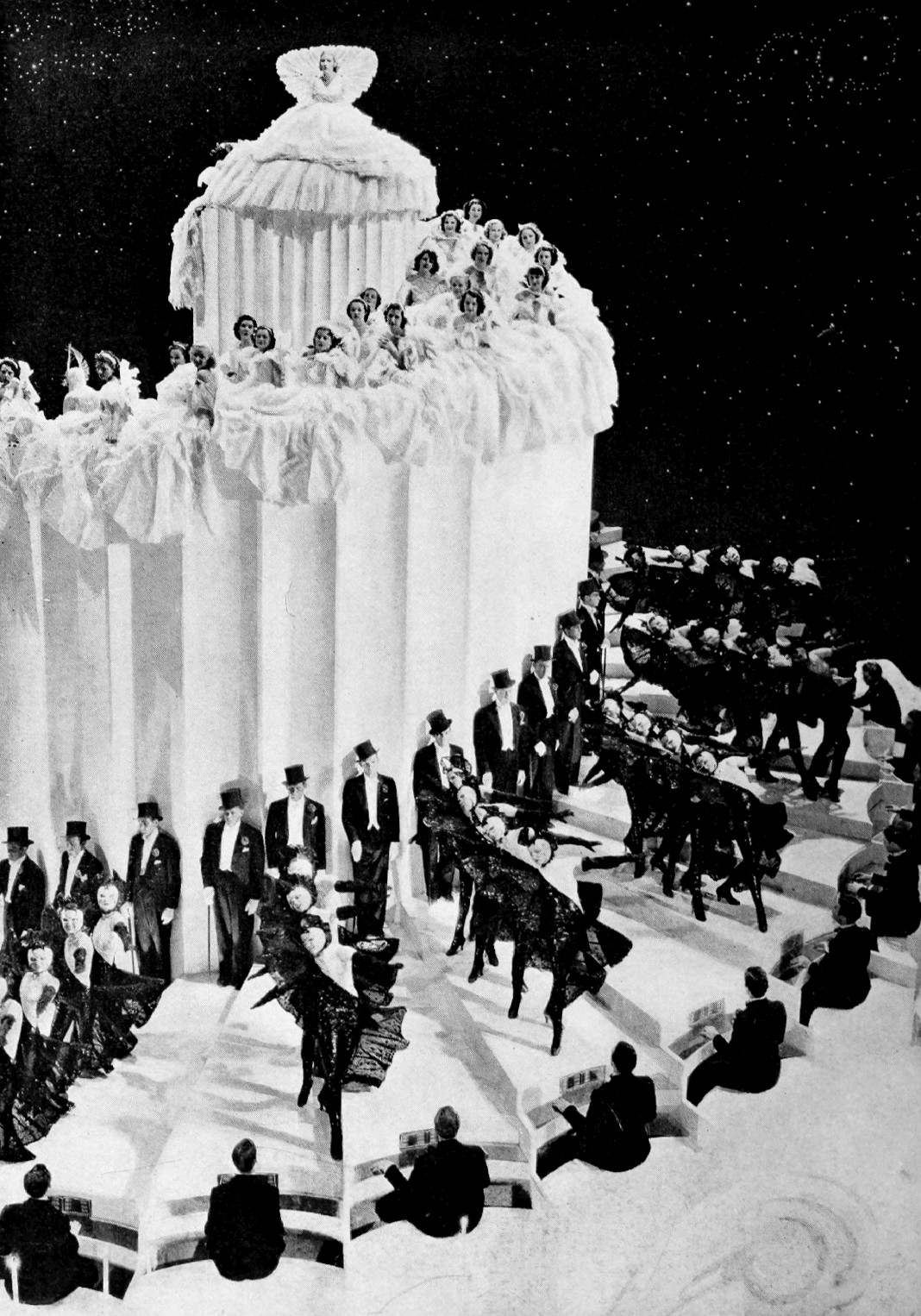
The extravagant "Wedding Cake" sequence featured a towering rotating volute of 70 ft diameter with 175 spiral steps, weighing 100 tons. This number, "A Pretty Girl is Like a Melody", won the Academy Award for Best Dance Direction for 1936.

Leonard, a film director who specialized in melodrama and musicals, anchored the music for the film, working with Walter Donaldson, Irving Berlin, and lyricist Harold Adamson. The extravagant dances and ensemble sequences were choreographed by Seymour Felix and Harold Adamson, including the song sequence of "A Pretty Girl Is Like a Melody" (it was Irving Berlin's 13th annual edition in 1919). The "A Pretty Girl Is Like a Melody" set, known as the "Wedding Cake", involved several weeks of shooting time and was reported to have cost US$220,000 (US$5,104,317 in 2025 dollars). As many as 180 performers were involved in the scenes which included singers, dancers and musicians. The sequence starts with Stanley Morner (soon to be known as Dennis Morgan) alone in front of the curtain, apparently singing “A Pretty Girl…” Apparently because, although he was an excellent singer “the song had previously been recorded by Allan Jones, another M-G-M contract player, and the studio apparently decided not to re-record the number.” After he sings the entire first verse and refrain, the front curtain begins to pull away and the stage begins to rotate, revealing people in 18th century costumes. The chorus continues to sing as the stage rotates through excerpts from romantic musical history, eventually reaching “Rhapsody in Blue” and an elaborate dance number. Then Morgan re-appears, standing among a crowd of pretty girls who are seated on the stairs. As he finishes the song, Virginia Bruce is revealed seated atop the tower, wearing a voluminous gown that spills over the edge. She faces front as the tower continues to turn. The camera pulls back to show the entire structure, and the satin curtain descends, enclosing each level in turn until the stage curtain closes.

The curtains, made of rayon silk, measured 4,300 yards (3,900 m). Sheldon Hall and Stephen Neale note the theatrical sense that the cinematographers achieved through shooting the sequence in virtually a single take. They mention that "the camera traverses an enormous platform set contained within a curtained proscenium (also enormous)", and that the "set itself revolves to meet the camera, rather than the camera entering the space of the set." Linda Mizejewski, author of a book on the Ziegfeld girls, argues that the Pretty Girl sequence is more than just about being showy; it is symbolic of womanhood which "powerfully visualizes women as the raw material for male aesthetic vision and design". In the film she believes that womanhood is defined by the "young, white, blond and slender" female, which in the sequence are "delineated as the fluffy, artificial tiers of costuming and staging".

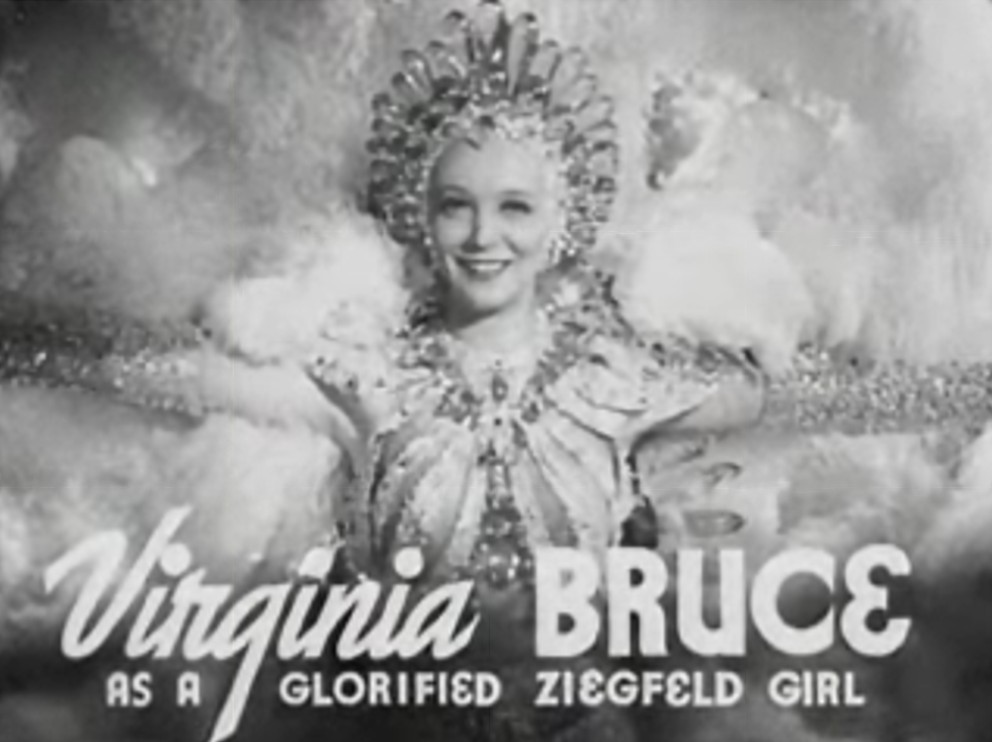
Actress and singer Virginia Bruce in The Great Ziegfeld.

The Harriet Hoctor ballet music was scored by Con Conrad to lyrics written by Herb Magidson. The circus ballet was an adaptation from the old Ziegfeld stage shows. Variety called the Hoctor ballet "in itself intricate with its maneuverings of six Russian wolfhounds in terp formations", and said that the "A Pretty Girl Is Like a Melody" sequence in the film is a "nifty Berlin tune [which] becomes the fulcrum for one of Frank Skinner's best arrangements as Arthur Lange batons the crescendos into a mad, glittering potpourri of Saint-Saëns and Gershwin, Strauss and Verdi, beautifully blended against the Berlinesque background. It's a scenic flash which makes the auditor wonder 'What can they do to follow that?' meaning in this or future film production." Juan Antonio Ramírez refers to the wedding cake as a "famous spiral column", citing it as one of the best known pieces of mobile architecture in film, but notes that in design the cake was not exclusive to The Great Ziegfeld, explaining that a wedding cake, albeit less flamboyant, had appeared in previous films such as King of Jazz (1930), The Kid from Spain (1932), Top Hat (1935), and Follow the Fleet (1936). Ramírez describes the film's Mise en scène as representing "the last word in flashy vulgarity, Surrealist kitsch, or perhaps both at once".

Selected songs

1. "Won't You Come and Play With Me" by Anna Held
2. "It's Delightful to Be Married" by Vincent Scotto–Anna Held
3. "If You Knew Susie" by Buddy G. DeSylva–Joseph Meyer
4. "Shine On, Harvest Moon" by Nora Bayes–Jack Norworth
5. "A Pretty Girl Is Like a Melody" by Irving Berlin
6. "You Gotta Pull Strings"
7. "She's a Follies Girl"
8. "You" by Walter Donaldson–Harold Adamson
9. "You Never Looked So Beautiful" by Walter Donaldson-Harold Adamson
10. "Yiddle on Your Fiddle" by Irving Berlin
11. "Mon homme" ("My Man") by Maurice Yvain, Jacques Charles–Albert Willemetz
12. "Queen of the Jungle" by Walter Donaldson-Harold Adamson
13. "Harriet Hoctor Ballet" (also known as "A Circus Must Be Different in a Ziegfeld Show") by Con Conrad–Herb Magidson

Finale:

1. "March of the Musketeers" from "The Three Musketeers" (Rudolf Friml)
2. "Ol’ Man River" from "Showboat" (Jerome Kern)
3. "Making Whoopee" from "Whoopee!" (Walter Donaldson–Gus Kahn)
4. "Rio Rita" (Harry Tierney–Joseph McCarthy)
5. Look for the Silver Lining" from "Sally" (Jerome Kern)

=== Aftermath ===
Farida Mazar filed a lawsuit against the filmmakers shortly before her death, claiming that they "presented Little Egypt as a lewd character". 14 witnesses who had seen the act at the 1893 Chicago World Fair supported this, although the lawsuit was dropped after Mahzar died from a heart attack. Burke caused much controversy and upset among many of Ziegfeld's friends and colleagues when she sold the rights to a production on Broadway, the Ziegfeld Follies, also starring Fanny Brice, at the time the film was released in 1936, due to the fact that the show was produced by the Shubert brothers, whom Ziegfeld detested. Worse still for his associates, was that the show was a bigger success than Ziegfeld's last production of the Follies in 1931. The Ziegfeld Follies under Vincente Minnelli initially was performed in December 1935 before making its Broadway debut on January 30, 1936. It was performed in Boston and Philadelphia until the production was postponed after Brice collapsed on stage with exhaustion. When it reopened on Broadway in September 1936, five months after the release of the film, it was retitled The New Ziegfeld Follies of 1936–1937, and was revamped considerably, with changes to the show's humor.

In 1941, Metro-Goldwyn-Mayer produced a sequel titled Ziegfeld Girl, starring James Stewart, Judy Garland, Hedy Lamarr, and Lana Turner, which recycled some film from The Great Ziegfeld. In 1946, MGM made another sequel, Ziegfeld Follies, directed by Vincente Minnelli, director of the stage show.

== Reception ==
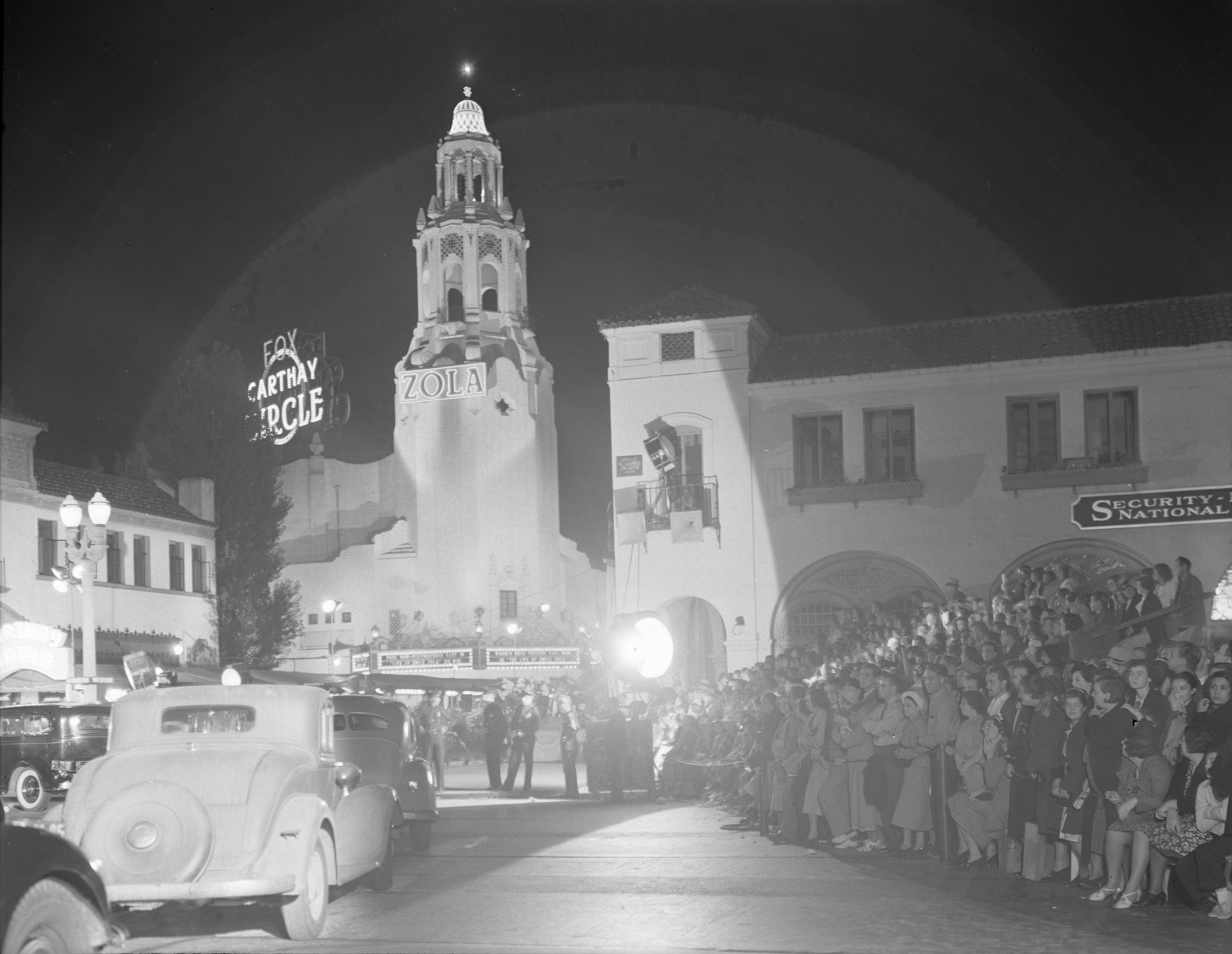
The Carthay Circle Theatre, pictured a year after The Great Ziegfeld was released.

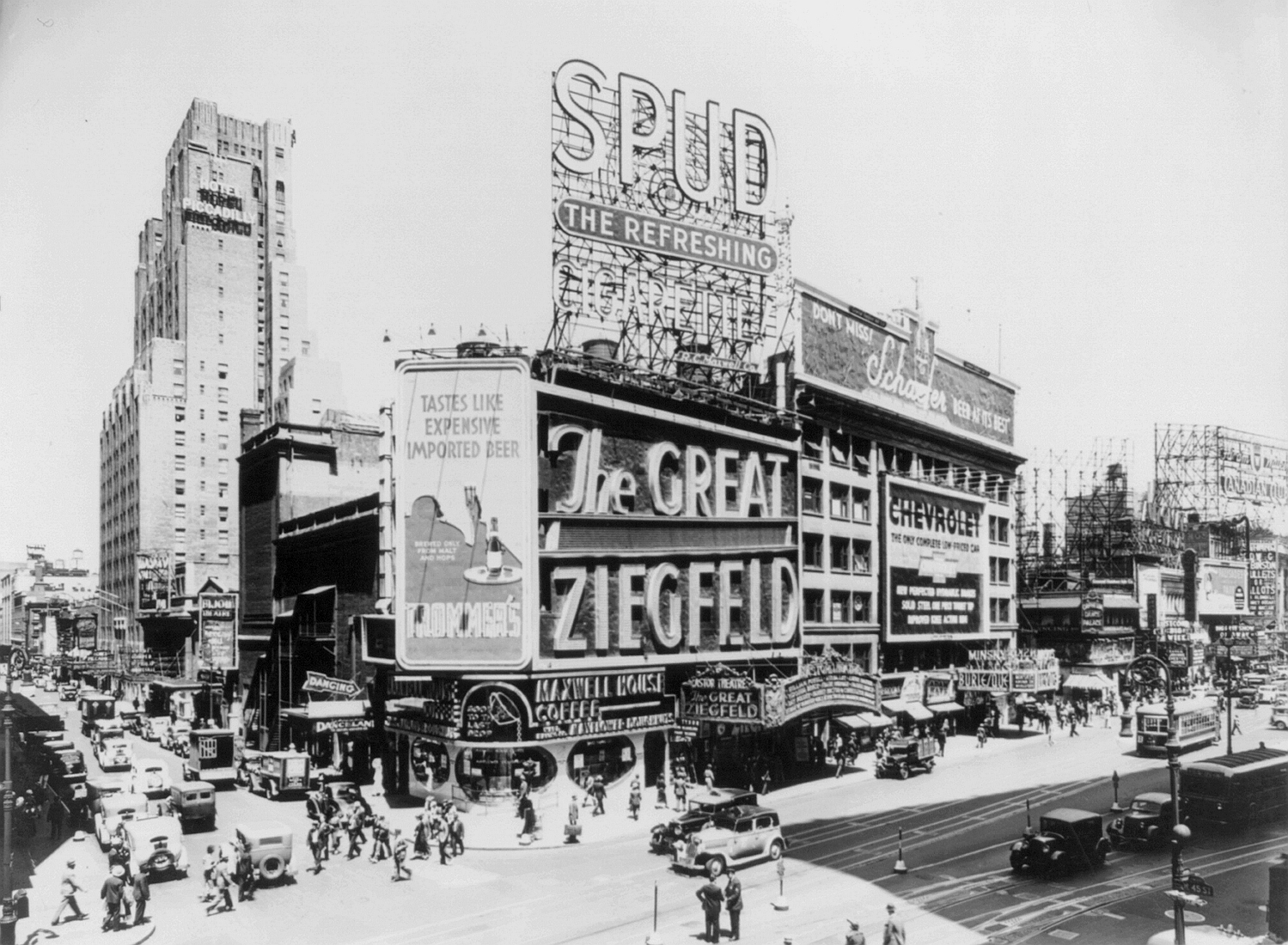
The Great Ziegfeld at the Astor Theatre on Broadway in 1936

=== Box office ===
According to MGM records, the film earned a then-massive $3,089,000 in the US and Canada and $1,584,000 elsewhere resulting in a profit of $822,000.

It was the 5th most popular film at the British box office in 1935–36.

=== Critical response at the time of release ===
The film, which premiered in Los Angeles at the Carthay Circle Theatre, was the first musical film in history for which one of its cast members won an Academy Award. Luise Rainer received the Best Actress Oscar for her portrayal of Anna Held, Ziegfeld's first wife. The film, the pride of MGM at a time when Warner Brothers and RKO Pictures were the leading studios in Hollywood for musical production, was a major commercial and critical success and one of the most successful films of the 1930s, grossing US$4,673,000 (US$108,420,324 in 2025 dollars) worldwide at the box office. It was acclaimed upon release as the greatest musical biography to be made in Hollywood and still remains a standard in musical film making. At just over three hours, The Great Ziegfeld was also the longest talking film of the time. (D.W. Griffith's The Birth of a Nation and Intolerance, both silent films, had each run over three hours.) TCM has acclaimed the "A Pretty Girl Is Like a Melody" sequence as one of "the most famous musical numbers ever filmed". Thomas S. Hischak has said that the film has rarely been topped for pure showmanship and glamour, and Variety considered it an "outstanding picture", a "symbol of a tradition of show business". Variety praised the performances of the cast, remarking that as Ziegfeld, William Powell "endows the impersonation with all the qualities of a great entrepreneur and sentimentalist without sacrificing the shades and moods called for" and noting that Luise Rainer is "tops of the femmes with her vivacious Anna Held". Stanley Green cited The Great Ziegfeld as "the first of a number of elaborate show-business screen biographies". Otis Ferguson, writing for New Republic magazine, remarked that the "musical numbers seem as irresistible as Ziegfeld himself". The New York American said that the film is "pretty nearly everything such an extravaganza should be", with "romance and reality, song and dance, gaiety and beauty, pathos and bathos". Time qualified it as "Pretentious, packed with hokum and as richly sentimental as an Irving Berlin lyric, it is, as such, top-notch entertainment." A reviewer for the Spokane Chronicle praised the film for its superb acting, writing that "[even] the great producer [Ziegfeld] would have been unable to produce scenes of magnitude and splendor that are given as part of the picture telling his life." Frank S. Nugent of The New York Times was also highly praising of the film, noting that it had "more stars than there are in the heavens" and remarking that "the picture achieves its best moments in the larger sequences devoted to the Girls — ballet, chorus and show. At least one of these spectacular numbers, filmed to the music of Irving Berlin's 'A Pretty Girl Is Like a Melody', with overtones of 'Rhapsody in Blue', never has been equaled on the musical comedy stage or screen." John Mosher of The New Yorker called it "the most lavish display the screen has had to offer" with chorus numbers that were "gigantic and effective", though he found the romance to be "peculiarly average screen-story stuff." Both The New York Times and Film Daily rated the film in the "Ten Best" of the year.

However, not all critics were as enthusiastic about the film; Graham Greene of the British Spectator called it a "huge inflated gas-blown object" and criticized its length, comparing it to the feat of a flagpole sitter. A number of critics, although praising the film in general, felt that Myrna Loy, who appears rather late on in the film, gave a lackluster performance as Billie Burke. Nugent said that "Miss Loy is a stately Bille Burke, and somewhat lacking, we fear, in Miss Burke's effervescence and gaiety", and Cecilia Agner thought she came across as "stilted, like her rigidly waxed and set blonde wig". Harrison Carroll of the Los Angeles Herald-Express, however, sympathized with the difficulty of her role in portraying a prominent living actress, confessing that he was pleased that Loy did not attempt to imitate Burke's mannerisms. Emily W. Leider believes that any of her character flaws were due to a "mushy" script, rather than her performance as an actress.

=== Critical re-evaluation ===
Although the film is still viewed as a symbol of glamour and excess during the Golden Age of Hollywood, the film's contemporary reception is mixed. Since its release, the film has been criticized in particular for its reliance on extravagance, being unnecessarily lengthy, and its overacting (particularly by Rainer). Review aggregator Rotten Tomatoes reports a 71% approval rating based on 70 reviews, with a weighted average of 6.2/10. The site's consensus reads: "This biopic is undeniably stylish, but loses points for excessive length, an overreliance on clichés, and historical inaccuracies". On Metacritic, the film has a weighted average score of 69 out of 100 based on 16 critics, indicating "generally favorable reviews".

Christopher Null stated that The Great Ziegfeld is a "textbook case of how a film can lose its appeal over the years". The film is occasionally cited as a "prime example of the Academy's fallibility" in a year when other critically acclaimed pictures such as Mr. Deeds Goes to Town were released, which some argue was more deserving of Best Picture.

Emily W. Leider claims the film to be "more remarkable for its "legs and tinsel" extravagance than for its excellence." David Parkinson of Empire gave the film three out of five stars and concluded that it "Drags in places and doesn't even try for a true-to-life portrait of the great theatre entrepreneur but it's shiny and big spectacle with impressive choreography."

Dave Kehr of the Chicago Reader called it "amazingly dull, even with William Powell in the lead and guest appearances by the likes of Ray Bolger and Fanny Brice." Emanuel Levy gave it a C grade and stated that it was "overlong and overblown but ultimately mediocre as a musical movie and as a biopic of the legendary showman."

James Berardinelli awarded it two and a half out of four stars, stating that "although some of the production's technical aspects remain impressive, the dramatic elements come across as trite and many of the musical numbers are dated", but said that it was a "reasonably competent – albeit "airbrushed" – presentation of the main character's life."

=== Accolades ===
The seven Academy Award nominations were announced on February 7, 1937, and on March 4, 1937, The Great Ziegfeld won three Oscars at the 9th Academy Awards for 1936:

Academy Award wins and nominations
Award	Result	Recipient(s)
Best Picture	Won	Metro-Goldwyn-Mayer (Hunt Stromberg, producer)
Best Actress	Won	Luise Rainer
Best Dance Direction	Won	Seymour Felix – For "A Pretty Girl Is Like a Melody".
Best Art Direction	Nominated	Cedric Gibbons, Eddie Imazu and Edwin B. Willis (lost to Dodsworth)
Best Director	Nominated	Robert Z. Leonard (lost to Frank Capra for Mr. Deeds Goes to Town)
Best Film Editing	Nominated	William S. Gray
Best Writing (Original Story)	Nominated	William Anthony McGuire

Although he was not nominated for an Academy Award for his performance, Powell did receive the Screen Actor's Guild award for Best Actor in a tie with C. Aubrey Smith who was in Little Lord Fauntleroy. In addition, the Guild's Best Actress was given to Luise Rainer.
