= Crazy That Way =

1930 film

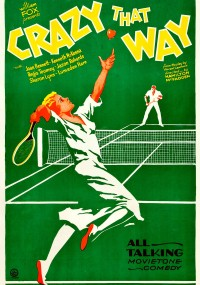
- Directed by: Hamilton MacFadden
- Written by: Vincent Lawrence (play); Marion Orth; Hamilton MacFadden
- Produced by: George E. Middleton
- Starring: Kenneth MacKenna; Joan Bennett; Regis Toomey; Jason Robards Sr.
- Cinematography: Joseph A. Valentine
- Edited by: Ralph Dietrich
- Production company: Fox Film Corporation
- Distributed by: Fox Film Corporation
- Release date: March 20, 1930
- Running time: 64 minutes
- Country: United States
- Language: English

Crazy That Way is a 1930 American pre-Code comedy film directed by Hamilton MacFadden and starring Kenneth MacKenna, Joan Bennett and Regis Toomey, and based on the play In Love With Love by Vincent Lawrence.

== Cast ==
- Kenneth MacKenna as Jack Gardner
- Joan Bennett as Ann Jordan
- Regis Toomey as Robert Metcalf
- Jason Robards Sr. as Frank Oakes
- Sharon Lynn as Marion Sars
- Lumsden Hare as Mr. Jordan

== Preservation status ==
This film is now thought to be a lost film.

== See also ==
- List of lost films

== Bibliography ==
- Kellow, Brian. The Bennetts: An Acting Family (University Press of Kentucky, 2004)
