= Sob Sister (film) =

1931 film

- Theatrical release poster
- Directed by: Alfred Santell
- Screenplay by: Edwin J. Burke
- Starring: James Dunn; Linda Watkins; Minna Gombell; Howard Phillips; George E. Stone; Molly O'Day
- Cinematography: Glen MacWilliams; Blake Wagner]
- Edited by: Ralph Dietrich
- Production company: Fox Film Corporation
- Distributed by: Fox Film Corporation
- Release date: October 25, 1931
- Running time: 67 minutes
- Country: United States
- Language: English

Sob Sister is a 1931 American romance film directed by Alfred Santell and written by Edwin J. Burke, and starring James Dunn, Linda Watkins, Minna Gombell, Howard Phillips, George E. Stone and Molly O'Day. It was released on October 25, 1931, by Fox Film Corporation.

== Cast ==
- James Dunn as Garry Webster
- Linda Watkins as Jane Ray
- Minna Gombell as Vonnie
- Howard Phillips as Ned Smith
- George E. Stone as Johnnie the Sheik
- Molly O'Day as Daisy
- Edward Dillon as Pat
- George Byron as Dutch
- Lex Lindsay as Slim
- Harold Waldridge as Johnny
- Neal Burns as Freddie
- Ernest Wood as Dave
- Harry Beresford as Pa Stevens
- Sarah Padden as Ma Stevens
- Charles Middleton as City Editor Baker
- George Chandler as Reporter
