= Stepping Sisters =

1932 film

- Directed by: Seymour Felix
- Written by: Howard Warren Comstock; William M. Conselman; Buddy G. DeSylva; Howard Lindsay; Neal O'Hara; Bertrand Robinson; Howard Emmett Rogers; Imogene Stanley; Charles Williams
- Produced by: William Goetz
- Starring: Louise Dresser; Minna Gombell; Jobyna Howland
- Cinematography: George Schneiderman
- Edited by: Jack Murray
- Music by: R.H. Bassett
- Production company: Fox Film Corporation
- Distributed by: Fox Film Corporation
- Release date: January 9, 1932
- Running time: 59 minutes
- Country: United States
- Language: English

Stepping Sisters is a 1932 American pre-Code comedy film directed by Seymour Felix and starring Louise Dresser, Minna Gombell and Jobyna Howland.

== Plot ==
A trio of former burlesque dancers now living in high society try to prevent their past occupation from being discovered.

== Main cast ==
- Louise Dresser as Mrs. Cissie Ramsey née Black
- Minna Gombell as Rosie La Marr
- Jobyna Howland as Lady Chetworth-Lynde aka Queenie
- William Collier Sr. as Herbert Ramsey
- Stanley Smith as Jack Carleton
- Barbara Weeks as Norma Ramsey
- Howard Phillips as Warren Tremaine
- Ferdinand Munier as Ambassador Leonard
- Mary Forbes as Mrs. Tremaine
- Robert Greig as Jepson
- Pietro Sosso as Butler
- Franklin Pangborn as Gason
- Arthur Housman as Max
- Max Wagner as Joey

== Bibliography ==
- Solomon, Aubrey. The Fox Film Corporation, 1915-1935. A History and Filmography. McFarland & Co, 2011.
