= Moses Mielziner =

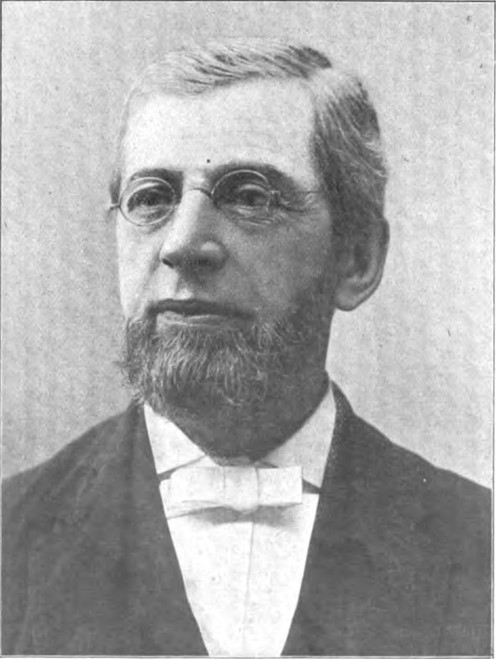
- Mielziner in 1905.

2nd President of Hebrew Union College
- In office March 26, 1900 – February 18, 1903
- Preceded by: Isaac Mayer Wise
- Succeeded by: Kaufmann Kohler

Personal details
- Born: August 12, 1828 Szubin, Kingdom of Prussia
- Died: February 18, 1903 (aged 74) Cincinnati, Ohio, U.S.
- Spouse: Rosette Levald (m. 1861)
- Children: 7, including Leo
- Relatives: Jo Mielziner (grandson); Kenneth MacKenna (grandson)
- Education: University of Giessen (PhD)

Moses Mielziner (August 12, 1828 in Schubin, Grand Duchy of Posen, Prussia - February 18, 1903 in Cincinnati) was an American Reform rabbi and author.

== Life ==
Mielziner received his first instruction in Talmudic literature from his father, Benjamin, who was the rabbi of his native town. At the same time, he received his secular education from L. I. Braunhart. In 1843, Mielziner was sent to Exin, where he attended the yeshiva of the aged rabbi Wolf Klausner, and in 1845 he went to Berlin in pursuit of further secular education, attending at the same time the Talmudic course of Rabbi J. J. Oettinger.

In 1848, having prepared himself privately for academic studies, he entered the University of Berlin. He remained there until 1852, when Samuel Holdheim, who took a great interest in him, recommended him to Waren in Mecklenburg as teacher and preacher. The Orthodox reaction introduced by the "Landrabbiner" Baruch Isaac Lipschütz in 1853 forced Mielziner, much to the regret of his congregation, to resign his position.

He then went to Denmark, where his brother Solomon was minister in Aalborg, and soon obtained a position at Randers in 1854. In 1857 he was called as principal of the religious school to Copenhagen, where he remained until 1865, when he was called to the rabbinate of the Congregation Anshe Chesed in New York City ("New Yorker Staats-Zeitung," 1865, No. 215). When this congregation was absorbed by the Beth-El congregation, he opened a private school, which he conducted until 1879, when he received a call as professor of Talmud and rabbinical literature from the Hebrew Union College in Cincinnati. Upon the death of Isaac Mayer Wise March 26, 1900, he became president of this institution, and held this position until his death.

== Works ==
Mielziner was not a voluminous writer. Apart from several sermons which he published, the first of which was delivered in Waren, 1854, he wrote Die Verhältnisse der Sklaven bei den Hebräern, Copenhagen, 1859, this being the thesis for which he received the degree of Ph.D. from the University of Giessen. This book appeared also in an English translation under the title "Slavery Among the Ancient Hebrews," Cincinnati, 1895.

As a result of his college lectures he published:

- Jewish Law of Marriage and Divorce, Cincinnati, 1884
- Introduction to the Talmud, ib. 1894; second edition, New York, 1903
- Legal Maxims of the Talmud, ib. 1898.

Mielziner edited a Danish almanac for the year 5622 = 1862–63, and A Selection from the Psalms for School and Family, Cincinnati, 1890. He also contributed to the Allgemeine Zeitung des Judenthums, Ben Chananja, the American Israelite, and Die Deborah, and wrote articles for the Year-Book of the Central Conference of American Rabbis and for The Jewish Encyclopedia.

== Family ==
Mielziner married Rosette Levald of Copenhagen in 1861. Of the seven children who survived him, Leo Mielziner was an artist in Paris and Jacob was a rabbi in Helena, Montana. Leo Mielziner would marry Ella Friend McKenna and become the father of five-time Tony Award-winning stage designer, Jo Mielziner and of the noted actor and MGM Story Director, Kenneth MacKenna.
