= Kenneth MacKenna =

American actor and director (1899–1962)

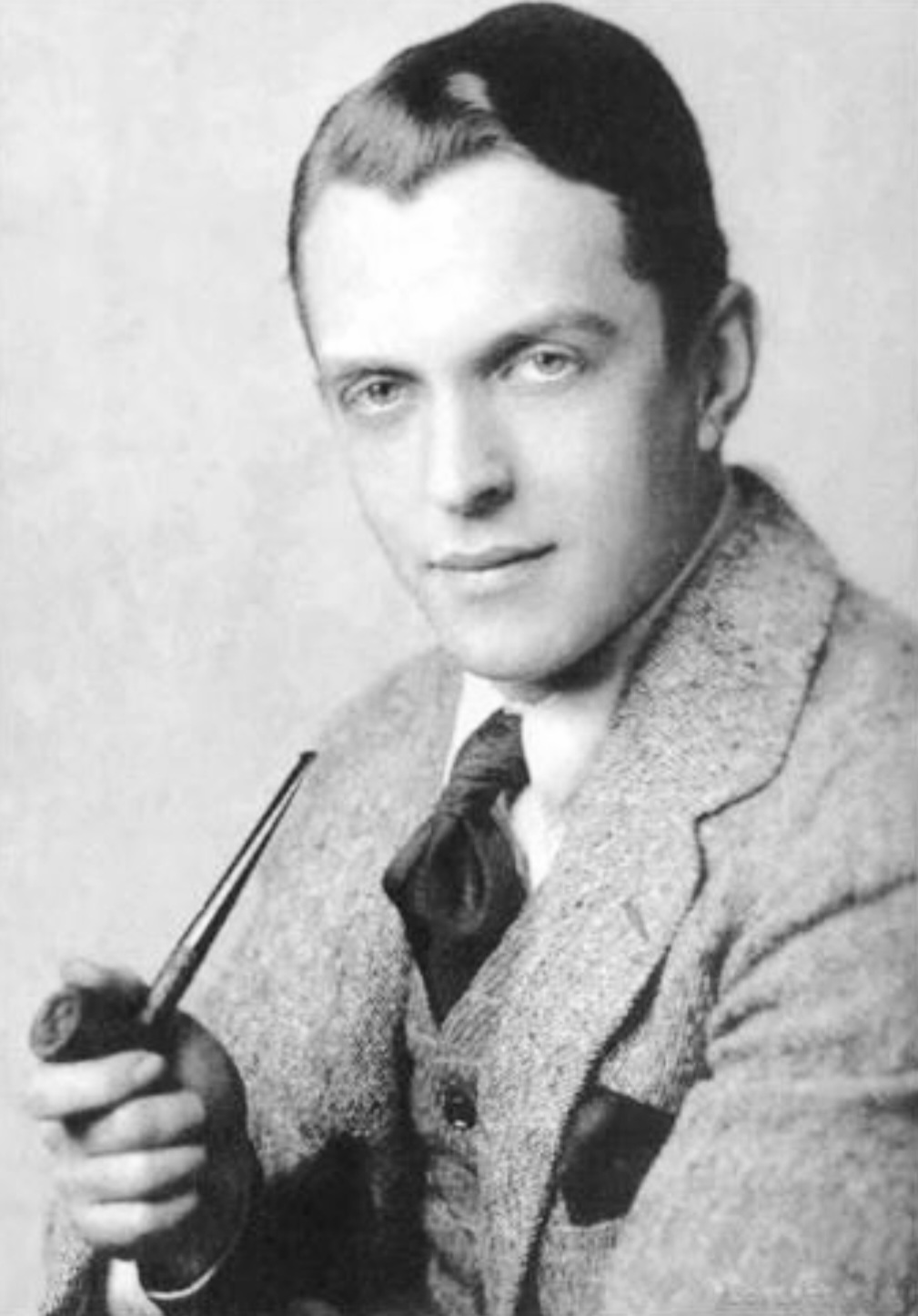
- Born: Leo Mielziner Jr. August 19, 1899; Canterbury, New Hampshire, U.S.
- Died: January 15, 1962 (aged 62); Glendale, California, U.S.
- Resting place: Forest Lawn Memorial Park, Glendale, California
- Occupations: Actor; director
- Years active: 1920–1961
- Spouses: Kay Francis (m. 1931; div. 1934) Mary Philips (m. 1938)

Kenneth MacKenna (born Leo Mielziner Jr.; August 19, 1899 – January 15, 1962) was an American actor and film director.

== Family ==
MacKenna was born as Leo Mielziner Jr. in Canterbury, New Hampshire, to portrait artist Leo Mielziner (December 7, 1868 - August 11, 1935), the son of a prominent Reform rabbi (Moses Mielziner) and Ella Lane McKenna Friend (March 18, 1873 – February 2, 1968).

In Mary C. Henderson's book about his brother, Jo Mielziner, Mielziner: Master of Modern Stage Design (2001), she states, "Kenneth MacKenna was the classic example of the first born son. On reaching manhood, he felt that it was his duty to take care of his entire family: mother, father and sibling. Responsible, intelligent and clear-headed he was constantly setting up strategies for his family as if he knew instinctively what was best—and he was usually right." (p. 92).MacKenna's devotion to his wife, Mary Philips, and to his brother, Jo, as well as to Jo's adopted son, Michael Mielziner, continued until his death and then beyond. His own professional success as a story director with MGM allowed him to help support his brother's career, give generously to others, and contribute to the theatre, even after his own death. Mielziner was a five-time Tony Award winner.

MacKenna and his wife, Mary Philips, both actors, were also long-time supporters of the arts. As angels for the first production of South Pacific, MacKenna first brought the book to Richard Rodgers, suggesting its production as a stage musical. The Rodgers had been long-time friends with the MacKennas/Mielziners. Mary Martin, who starred in that production, created an embroidered signature scarf of all the stars in that first production of South Pacific and presented it as a gift of thanks to the MacKennas. This scarf was later given as a gift to Lucille Hackett (née Bardorf), cousin and beloved "sister" to Philips. MacKenna's role as an angel and his position as a director with MGM can be further researched through the Mielziner papers at the New York Public Library and through the library at MGM. Philips had a successful career as a stage and film star during the golden age of the theatre. In September 1924, Humphrey Bogart had appeared in the Broadway play Nerves with MacKenna and Philips. They all became good and lifelong friends. Philips was later married to Bogart (1928–1938), but the marriage ended in divorce. MacKenna married Philips in 1938. It was the second and final marriage for both.

MacKenna was first married to actress Kay Francis on January 17, 1931. They divorced in February 1934. He married Philips in August 1938 and they remained married until his death from cancer. As his wife, long-time friend, and companion, Philips described Kenneth as her true soulmate and felt as though her own life had come to an end when Kenneth died. MacKenna died on January 15, 1962, in Santa Monica, California, at age 62. He and Philips were buried at Forest Lawn Memorial Park in Glendale, California.

== Biography ==
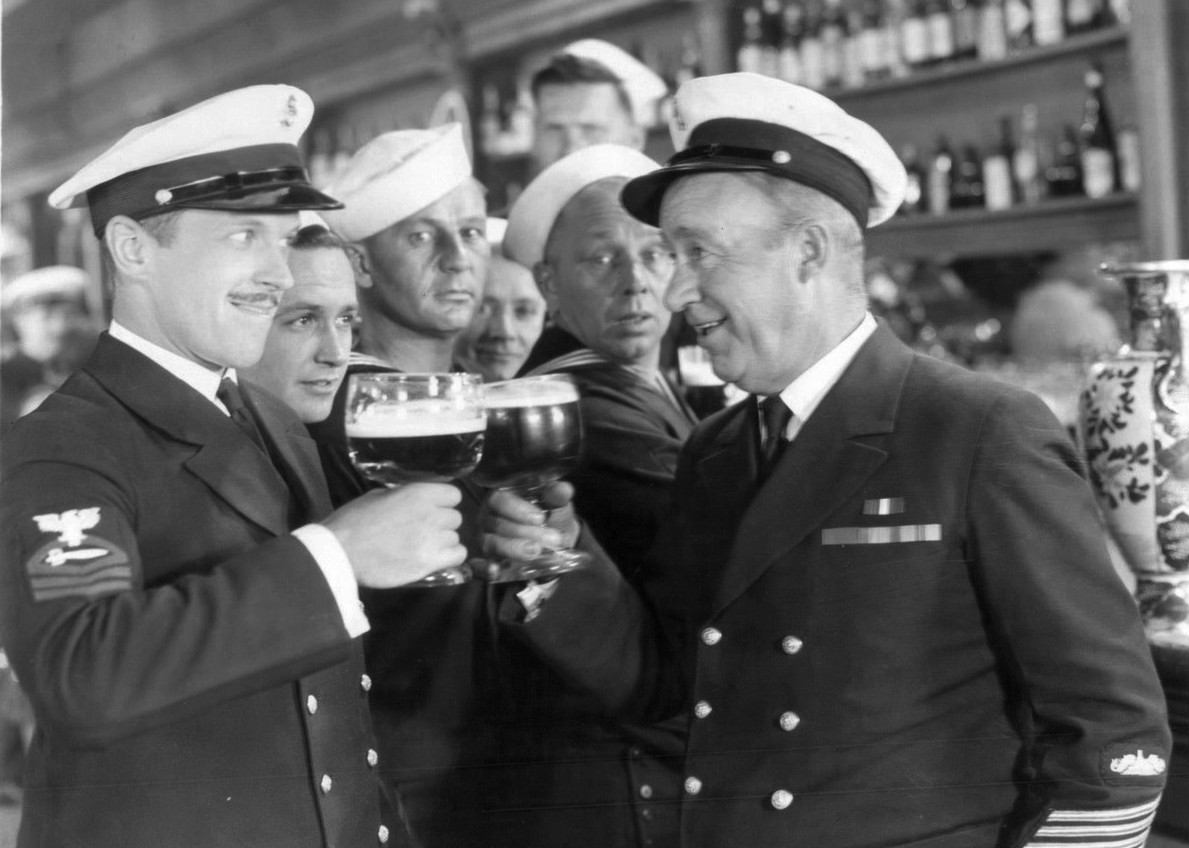
Kenneth MacKenna and J. Farrell MacDonald in Men Without Women (1930)

MacKenna was involved with bonds and stocks until he was discovered by William Brady and became a member of the cast of At 9:45. He debuted on Broadway in Opportunity (1920). While in New York, he also directed and produced plays for the Theater Guild.

Starting in 1931, he directed a few films in Hollywood, then resumed his Broadway theatre career in the mid-1930s. Soon Metro-Goldwyn-Mayer hired him as a story editor in New York. Later, back in Hollywood, he was made department head. He returned to acting in the late 1950s both on stage and in film.

Dore Schary, head of production at MGM in the 1950s, called MacKenna "intelligent and well educated — had good humor — and was incorruptible. He had served in World War I and had gone back into action in World War II. We liked and trusted each other in fast friendship."

One of MacKenna's last roles was portraying fictional Judge Kenneth Norris in the film Judgment at Nuremberg, which was released less than a month before MacKenna's death.

== Broadway stage ==
- 1920: Opportunity as Jimmy Dow
- 1920: Immodest Violet as Arthur Bodkin
- 1922: The Nest as Max Hamelin
- 1922: The Endless Chain as Kenneth Reeves
- 1922: The World We Live In as Commander-in-Chief of Yellow Ants and as Felix
- 1923: The Mad Honeymoon as Wally Spencer
- 1923: The Crooked Square as Robert Colby
- 1923: Windows as Johnny March
- 1923: Dumb-bell as Ted Stone
- 1924: We Moderns as Richard
- 1924: Catskill Dutch as Peetcha
- 1924: Nerves as Jack Coates
- 1924: The Far Cry as Dick Clayton
- 1925: The Sapphire Ring as Dr. Erno Nemeth
- 1925: Oh, Mama as Georges La Garde
- 1926: The Masque of Venice as Jack Cazeneuve
- 1926: What Every Woman Knows as John Shand
- 1928: The Big Pond as Pierre Dimarande
- 1928: A Play without a Name as John Russell
- 1930: Man Trouble as Graham
- 1934: By Your Leave as David MacKenzie
- 1934: Wife Insurance as Gregory Landon
- 1934: Merrily We Roll Along as Richard Niles
- 1935: Othello as Iago
- 1935: Macbeth as Macduff
- 1936: Aged 26 as Charles Armitage Brown
- 1937: Penny Wise as Gordon
- 1959: The Highest Tree as Aaron Cornish

Produced & directed

- 1936: Co-respondent Unknown

== Films (directing) ==
- 1931: Always Goodbye Fox Film Corp.
- 1931: The Spider Fox Film Corp.
- 1931: Good Sport Fox Film Corp.
- 1932: Careless Lady Fox Film Corp.
- 1933: Walls of Gold Fox Film Corp.
- 1934: Sleepers East Fox Film Corp.

== Film appearances (acting) ==
- 1925: Miss Bluebeard as Bob Hawley
- 1925: A Kiss in the Dark as Johnny King
- 1926: The American Venus as Horace Niles
- 1927: The Lunatic at Large as William Carroll / Henry Carroll
- 1929: Pleasure Crazed as Captain Anthony Dean
- 1929: South Sea Rose as Dr. Tom Winston
- 1930: Sin Takes a Holiday as Gaylord Stanton
- 1930: Forever Yours (film left unfinished by Mary Pickford)
- 1930: Men Without Women as Chief Torpedoman Burke
- 1930: Crazy That Way as Jack Gardner
- 1930: The Three Sisters as Count d'Amati
- 1930: Temple Tower as Bulldog Drummond
- 1930: The Virtuous Sin as Lieutenant Victor Sablin
- 1930: Forever Yours
- 1931: The Man Who Came Back (1931) as Captain Trevelyan
- 1931: The Spider (1931) as Cashier (uncredited)
- 1931: Good Sport (1931) as Rental Agent (uncredited)
- 1932: Those We Love as Freddie Williston
- 1933: Sensation Hunters as Jimmy Crosby
- 1960: High Time (1960) as President Byrne of Pinehurst
- 1961: Judgment at Nuremberg as Judge Kenneth Norris
- 1962: 13 West Street as Paul Logan (final film role)

== Selected television appearances ==
- Alfred Hitchcock Presents (1961) (Season 6 Episode 22: "The Horseplayer") as Bishop Cannon

== Notes ==
- Mary C. Henderson, Mielziner: Master of Modern Stage Design (2001)
