= Seymour Felix =

American director, performer, and choreographer

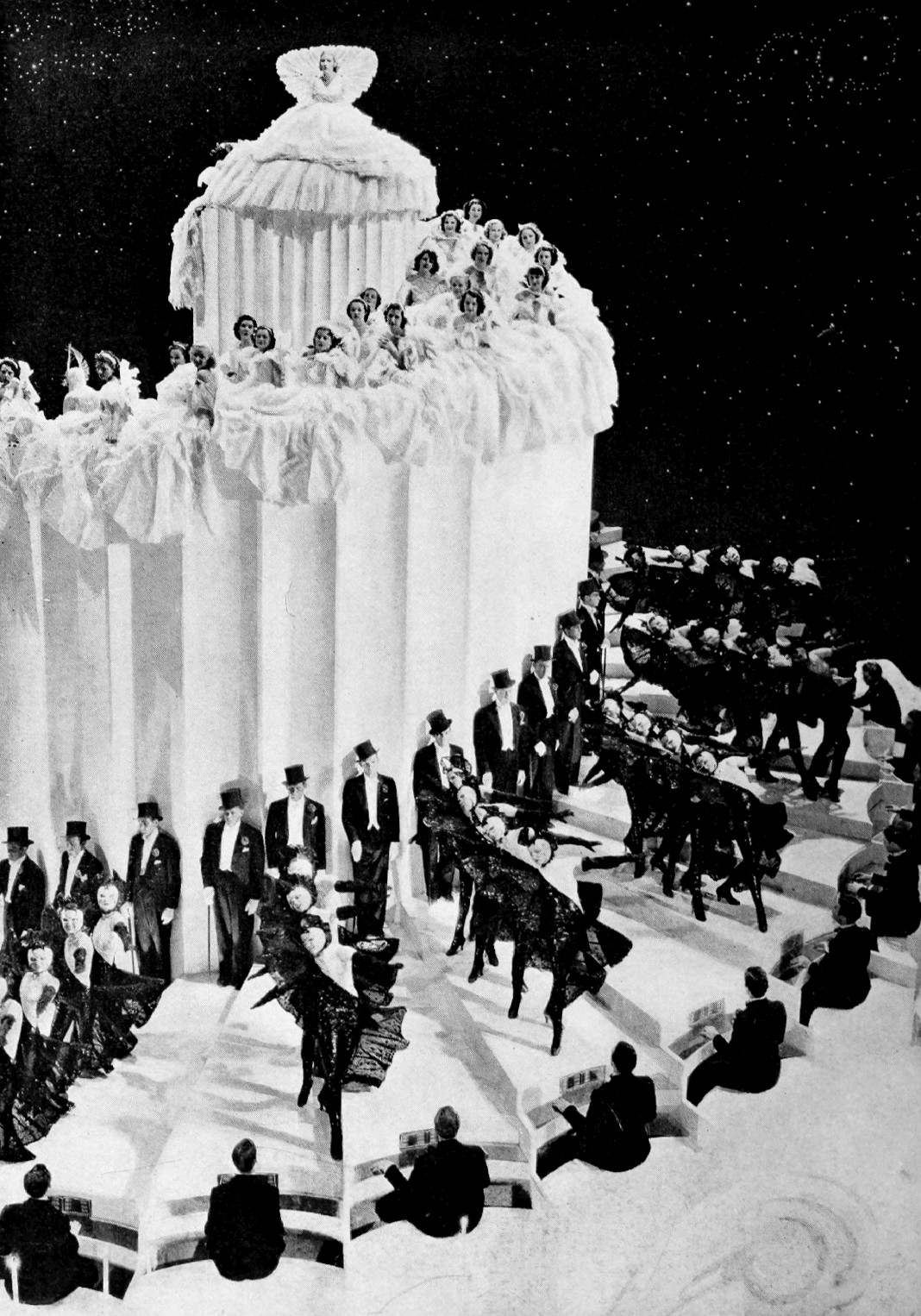
Seymour Felix won the Academy Award for Best Dance Direction for the spectacular "A Pretty Girl Is Like A Melody" from The Great Ziegfeld (MGM, 1936)

Seymour Felix (October 23, 1892 – March 16, 1961) was an American director, performer, and choreographer best known for his work in early Broadway musicals.

Seymour was born on October 23, 1892, in New York City. He began his show business career as a professional dancer in vaudeville at the age of 15. In the 1920s he became a dance director in New York, creating and staging dance numbers for such shows as Hit the Deck (1927), Whoopee! (1928), and Rosalie (1928).

In 1929, he moved to Hollywood to begin staging musical films. Although he did direct two films, Girls Demand Excitement (1931) and Stepping Sisters (1932), he enjoyed his greatest successes as a choreographer in both New York and Los Angeles. In Los Angeles, he choreographed his most notable films such as The Great Ziegfeld (1936), Alexander's Ragtime Band (1938), Rose of Washington Square (1939), Yankee Doodle Dandy (1942, which he choreographed with LeRoy Prinz and Jack Boyle), and Cover Girl (1944).

Felix amassed sixteen Broadway credits in his career, with his last being Strike Me Pink in 1933. He died on March 16, 1961, in Los Angeles.

== Awards ==
Felix won the Academy Award for Best Dance Direction (a short-lived award given from 1935 to 1937) for staging "A Pretty Girl Is Like a Melody" in The Great Ziegfeld (1936).
