= Jo Mielziner =

American designer (1901-1976)

- Born: Joseph Mielziner; March 19, 1901; Paris, France
- Died: March 15, 1976 (aged 74); New York City, New York, U.S.
- Known for: Scenic design
- Awards: Tony Award; Drama Desk Award for Outstanding Set Design; Academy Award for Best Art Direction

Joseph Mielziner (March 19, 1901 – March 15, 1976) was an American theatrical scenic, and lighting designer born in Paris, France. He was described as "the most successful set designer of the Golden era of Broadway", and worked on both stage plays and musicals.

== Career ==
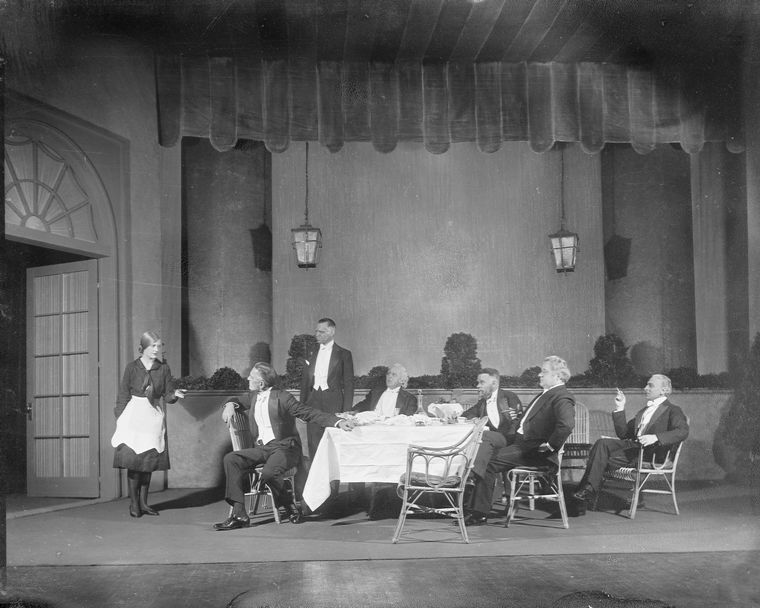
Jo Mielziner's design for George Bernard Shaw's The Doctor's Dilemma (1927)

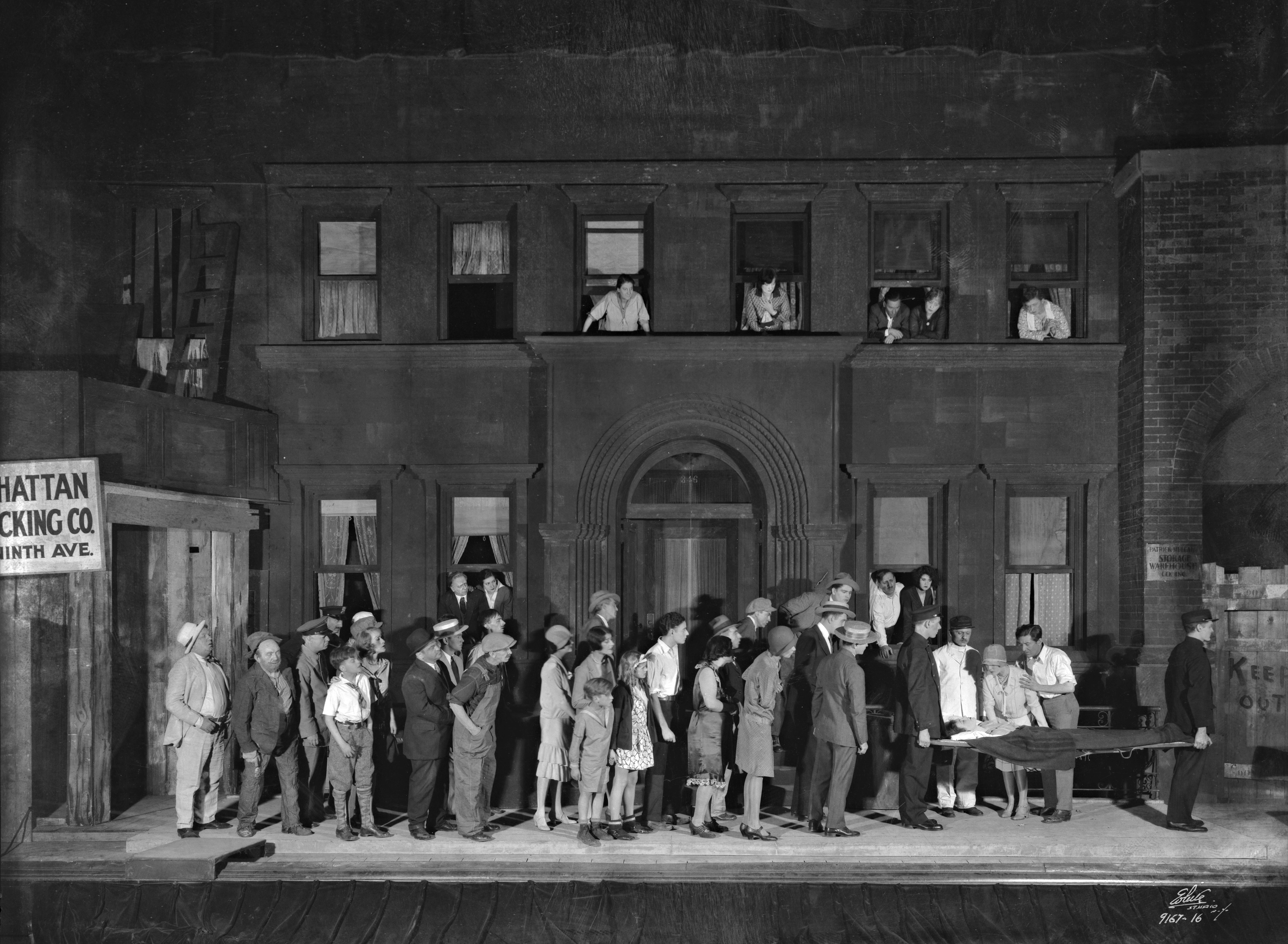
Mielziner's setting for Elmer Rice's Street Scene (1929)

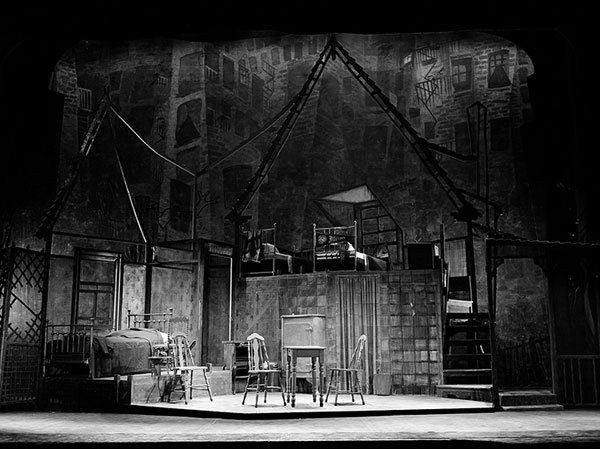
Mielziner's set design for Arthur Miller's Death of a Salesman (1949)

Joseph Mielziner was the son of artist Leo Mielziner and Ella Lane McKenna Friend, a writer. Mielziner was the brother of actor-director Kenneth MacKenna. Their paternal grandfather, Moses Mielziner, was a rabbi. He studied painting at the Art Students League and the Pennsylvania Academy of the Fine Arts. His brother recruited him as a stage manager for summer stock, where Mielziner discovered his passion for scenic design. With fellowships he received from the Pennsylvania Academy, he had the opportunity to study set design in Paris, Vienna, and Berlin. Additionally, he served as an apprentice to Robert Edmond Jones, designer of Eugene O'Neill's Desire Under The Elms.

Mielziner was considered one of the most influential theatre designers of the 20th century, designing the scenery and often the lighting for more than 200 productions, many of which became American classics. He "pioneered 'selective realism' in scenic design". According to his obituary, he was perhaps "praised most often...for his sweeping canvas of people under the Brooklyn Bridge, used as a backdrop for Maxwell Anderson's Winterset.

After his education and spending 13 months in Europe "absorbing the revolutionary changes occurring in traditional stage design", in 1923 he worked for the Theatre Guild in New York as an assistant stage manager and bit actor. Mielziner's Broadway debut as a designer was in 1927 with The Guardsman, for which he designed the scenery and lighting. His other Broadway credits include the original productions of Strange Interlude, Sweet and Low, Of Thee I Sing, The Barretts of Wimpole Street, Winterset, Oh, Captain!, Dodsworth, Another Part of the Forest, Carousel, South Pacific, Guys and Dolls, The King and I, A Streetcar Named Desire, Death of a Salesman, Cat on a Hot Tin Roof, Gypsy, and The Prime of Miss Jean Brodie, as well as the film Picnic and the ballet Who Cares?. He won the Academy Award for best color art direction for his work on Picnic.

During World War II, Mielziner worked as a camouflage specialist with the United States Air Force, until he was transferred to the Office of Strategic Services, a precursor to the CIA, where he served under General William J. "Wild Bill" Donovan.

In the course of his career, Mielziner won seven Tony Awards and was nominated for another five. He also won the Drama Desk Award for Outstanding Set Design. His influence extended outside of the theatre. He was acquainted with the American artist Edward Hopper, who is said to have modeled his well-known painting Early Sunday Morning (1930) after Mielziner's set for Elmer Rice's play Street Scene, produced in 1929.

Mielziner designed the theater at Wake Forest University and co-designed the Vivian Beaumont Theater at Lincoln Center with architect Eero Saarinen. He designed the setting for the Vatican Pavilion's showing of Michelangelo's Pietà at the 1964 New York World's Fair.

== Later years ==
Mielziner resided for many years at The Dakota and can be seen working in his studio in an exterior shot in the film Rosemary's Baby.

He died on March 15, 1976, in a New York taxicab, four days before his 75th birthday. Mielziner was rushing between meetings for The Baker's Wife, a musical for which he was designing.

== Personal life ==
Mielziner was of both Jewish and Christian ancestries, though he converted to Roman Catholicism under the influence of Bishop Fulton J. Sheen.

He was married three times, all of which were tumultuous, though only two ended in divorce. Mielziner's first wife, Marya Mannes, a literary critic he married in 1926, was unfaithful to him. Annie Laurie Jacques, an actress and Mielziner's second wife, whom he married in 1932, had substance abuse problems. Though, as a Roman Catholic, Mielziner could not divorce his third wife, actress Jean MacIntyre, their relationship ended due to Mielziner's relationship with Sheen's private secretary.

Mielziner and MacIntyre married in 1938, and had long since separated at the time of death in 1976, despite remaining legally married.

== Legacy ==
Mielziner's scenic designs for the original production of Arthur Miller's Death of a Salesman were re-created for the 2012 Broadway revival starring Philip Seymour Hoffman, Andrew Garfield and Linda Emond. Director Mike Nichols said he felt he needed Mielziner's original set because it was "intimately connected with the way the play developed." He went on to say he has never seen anything "near as good in any of the productions of 'Salesman' because it's everything and nothing."
