= Leo Mielziner =

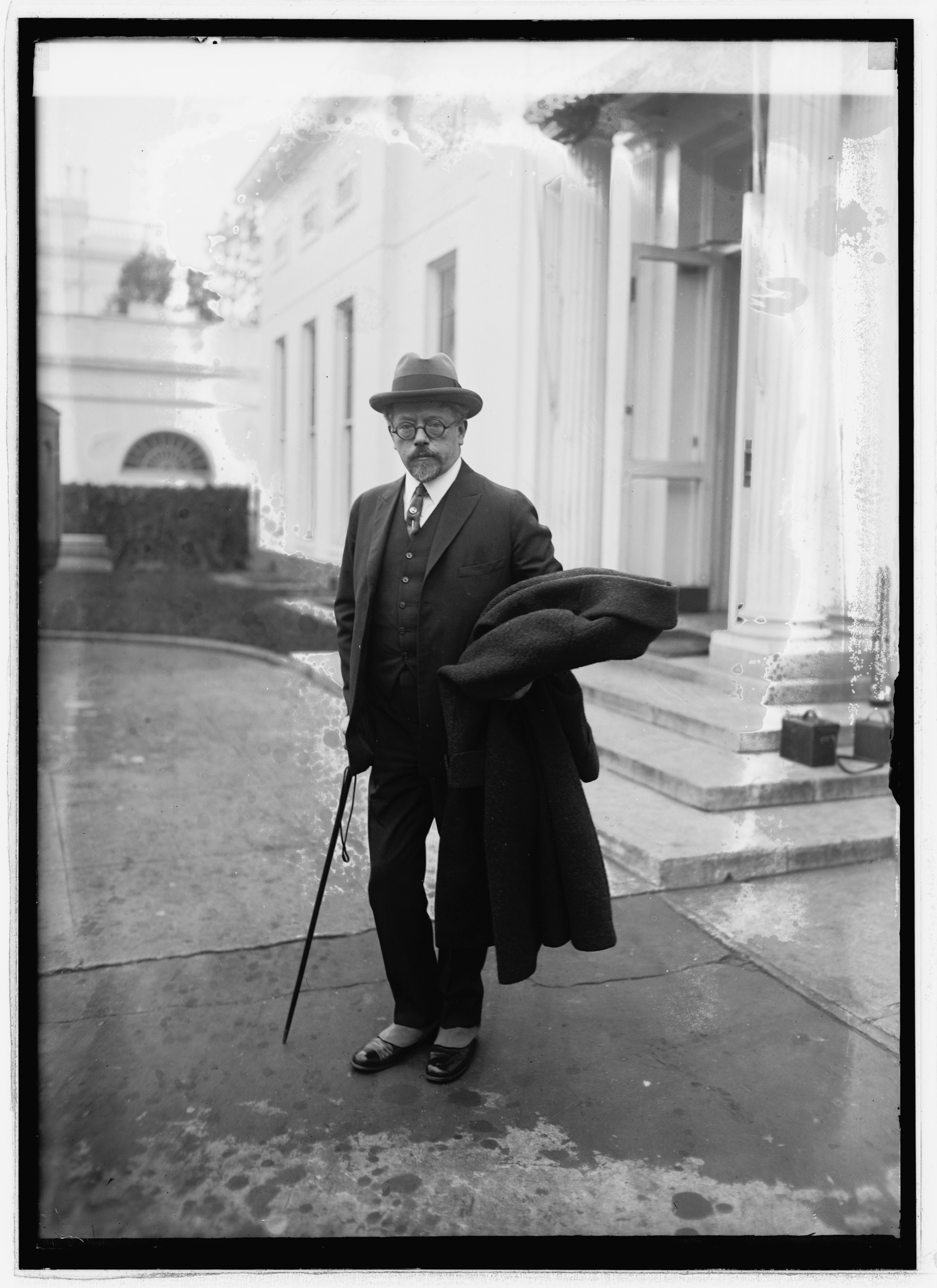

Leo Mielziner (8 December 1869 – 11 August 1935) was a noted portrait artist.

Leo was the son of Dr. Moses Mielziner (1828-1903), Rabbi, and Rosette Mielziner Levald of Copenhagen who had married in 1861. His father taught at Hebrew Union College and was a noted Talmudic scholar, publishing among other works, An Introduction to the Talmud.

Leo and his twin sister Bella Mielziner were born in Bushwick, Brooklyn at 22 Jefferson Street, but then moved as children with their family to settle in Cincinnati, Ohio. They were two of ten children, one of whom died in infancy. When Moses Mielzinger died in 1903, Leo was an artist in Paris and beside his brother Jacob — who was a rabbi in Helena, Montana — one of the seven children who survived Moses.

Leo Mielziner would marry Ella Friend McKenna and become the father of the noted actor and MGM Story Director, Kenneth MacKenna (1899–1962) and of the five-time Tony Award-winning stage designer, Jo Mielziner (1901-1976).

== Sources ==
- « Mielziner, Leo », In : William H. Ingram, Who’s who in Paris Anglo-American colony : a biographical dictionary of the leading members of the Anglo-American colony of Paris, The American Register, Paris, 1905, p. 63 (online)
- Henderson, Mary C., Mielziner: Master of Modern Stage Design, 2001
