= Man Trouble (1930 film) =

1930 film

- Theatrical release poster
- Directed by: Berthold Viertel
- Screenplay by: Marion Orth; George Manker Watters; Edwin J. Burke
- Starring: Milton Sills; Dorothy Mackaill; Kenneth MacKenna; Sharon Lynn; Roscoe Karns; Oscar Apfel
- Cinematography: Joseph H. August
- Edited by: J. Edwin Robbins
- Production company: Fox Film Corporation
- Distributed by: Fox Film Corporation
- Release date: August 24, 1930
- Running time: 85 minutes
- Country: United States
- Language: English

Man Trouble is a 1930 American pre-Code musical drama film directed by Berthold Viertel and written by Marion Orth, George Manker Watters and Edwin J. Burke. The film stars Milton Sills, Dorothy Mackaill, Kenneth MacKenna, Sharon Lynn, Roscoe Karns and Oscar Apfel. The film was released on August 24, 1930, by Fox Film Corporation.

== Cast ==
- Milton Sills as Mac
- Dorothy Mackaill as Joan
- Kenneth MacKenna as Graham
- Sharon Lynn as Trixie
- Roscoe Karns as Scott
- Oscar Apfel as Eddie
- James Bradbury Jr. as Goofy
- Harvey Clark as Uncle Joe
- Edythe Chapman as Aunt Maggie
- Lew Harvey as Chris
- Paul Fix as The Kid - A Gunman
