= Edith Fitzgerald =

American screenwriter and playwright (1889–1968)

- Born: January 23, 1889; Burnside, Kentucky, US
- Died: February 4, 1968 (aged 79); Charlotte, North Carolina, US
- Occupations: Screenwriter, playwright

Edith Fitzgerald (1889–1968) was an American screenwriter and playwright active primarily during the 1930s.

== Biography ==
Born and raised in Burnside, Kentucky, Edith Pearl Fitzgerald was one of 12 children born to John Fitzgerald and Dora Roberts.

During the course of her career, she co-wrote several Broadway plays with Robert Riskin, her then-boyfriend, including Her Delicate Condition. The two parted ways after they moved to the West Coast, and they never married despite press reports to the contrary.

She was married to Elmer Griffin, a star tennis player, and she became a tennis champion in her own right. She died in 1968 in Charlotte, North Carolina, after a brief illness.

== Partial filmography ==
- Within the Law (1939)
- My American Wife (1936)
- Small Town Girl (1936)
- The Wedding Night (1935)
- The Painted Veil (1934)
- Brief Moment (1933) (adaptation)
- Today We Live (1933)
- Many a Slip (1931)
- Illicit (1931)
- Ex-Lady (1933)
