= Protection (1929 film) =

1929 film

- Directed by: Benjamin Stoloff
- Screenplay by: Frederick Hazlitt Brennan
- Story by: J. Clarkson Miller
- Starring: Dorothy Burgess; Robert Elliott; Paul Page; Joe Brown
- Cinematography: Joseph Valentine
- Production company: Fox Film Corporation
- Distributed by: Fox Film Corporation
- Release date: May 5, 1929
- Running time: 58 minutes
- Country: United States
- Languages: Sound (Synchronized); English Intertitles

Protection is a 1929 American Synchronized sound pre-Code drama film directed by Benjamin Stoloff and written by Frederick Hazlitt Brennan. The film stars Dorothy Burgess, Robert Elliott, Paul Page, and Joe Brown. While the film has no audible dialog, it was released with a synchronized musical score with sound effects using both the sound-on-disc and sound-on-film process. The film was released on May 5, 1929, by Fox Film Corporation.

== Cast ==
- Dorothy Burgess as Myrtle Hines
- Robert Elliott as Wallace Crockett
- Paul Page as Chick Slater
- Ben Hewlett as James Rollans
- Dorothy Ward as Judy Revis
- Joe Brown as Joe Brown
- Roy Stewart as Ollie Bogardt
- William H. Tooker as Harry Lamson

== See also ==
- List of early sound feature films (1926–1929)
