= Women Men Marry =

Women Men Marry may refer to:

- Women Men Marry (1922 film), a silent film drama
- Women Men Marry (1931 film), an American pre-Code drama film
- The Women Men Marry, a 1937 American drama film
