= Barbara Weeks (film actress) =

American actress (1913–2003)

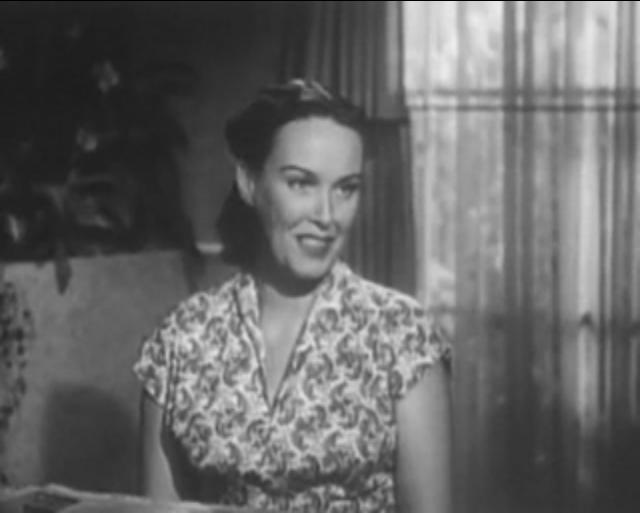
- Weeks in The Violent Years (1956)
- Born: July 4, 1913; Somerville, Massachusetts, U.S.
- Died: June 24, 2003 (aged 89); Las Vegas, Nevada, U.S.
- Education: Melrose High School
- Occupation: Film actress
- Known for: Palmy Days; By Whose Hand?
- Spouse(s): Lewis Parker (m. 1938; died 1945) Guinn Williams (m. 19??; div. 19??); William Cox (m. 19??; div. 19??)
- Children: 1

Barbara Weeks (born Susan Kingsley; July 4, 1913 – June 24, 2003) was an American film actress who performed primarily in Hollywood productions of the 1930s.

== Early years ==
Weeks was born in Somerville, Massachusetts, and attended Melrose High School. Her mother was an actress, and "from the time Barbara was 3 years old her ambition was to be an actress, too." She entered acting through her participation in the Ziegfeld Follies, when she was cast in Whoopee!. "I was scared to death," Weeks said of meeting Florenz Ziegfeld. "His office was an oblong room and you had to walk and walk to get to his desk. He was seated behind his desk, where on top were an assortment of toy elephants. I'll never forget that meeting." After the show closed, Weeks and other cast members, including star Eddie Cantor and Ethel Shutta, were brought to Hollywood to make the film version. Weeks felt it did not translate well, in spite of its smash hit success. "The audience has a lot to do with it. When you are on the stage, every audience is different. Filming is very tiresome and boring, and it doesn't give you the enthusiasm you get from the stage. That was evident in Whoopee! the film."

== Film ==
In 1931, Weeks was named as one of 14 girls selected as a "WAMPAS Baby Star", which launched her into a brief but successful acting career, mostly in cliffhanger serials and B-movie films and B-Westerns. She claimed placement in westerns was punishment by Columbia head Harry Cohn for refusing his advances. "Cohn, however, never realized how much I liked being in them," she said. "He considered westerns punishment, but naturally I never mentioned it to him. I just enjoyed myself." He loaned her out to low budget studios to humiliate her as well, but it backfired. One of the films she was most proud of was Woman Unafraid, made by Goldsmith.

On August 23, 1938, Weeks appeared in a television experiment at NBC, an adaptation of Edwin Burke's play Good Medicine, co-starring Pat Lawrence and Lily Cahill. NBC telecasts were officially secret at the time, with audiences limited to 500–1000 viewers on company-owned sets.

== Later years ==
Following Parker's death, Weeks moved to New York City and began working as a model.

Weeks had "a brief marriage to the actor Guinn 'Big Boy' Williams."

== Partial filmography ==
- Whoopee! (1930) - Goldwyn Girl (uncredited)
- Man to Man (1930) - Alice (uncredited)
- Illicit (1931) - Girl at the Bridal Shower (uncredited)
- 50 Million Frenchmen (1931) - Dowager's Daughter (uncredited)
- Party Husband (1931) - Sally (uncredited)
- Men of the Sky (1931) - (uncredited)
- Palmy Days (1931) - Joan Clark
- Two Fisted Justice (1931) - Nancy Cameron
- Men in Her Life (1931) - Miss Mulholland
- The Guilty Generation (1931) - Party Girl (uncredited)
- Discarded Lovers (1932) - Valerie Christine
- Stepping Sisters (1932) - Norma Ramsey
- Cheaters at Play (1932) - Fenno Crozier
- The Greeks Had a Word for Them (1932) - Beautician (uncredited)
- Devil's Lottery (1932) - Joan Mather
- Hell's Headquarters (1932) - Diane Cameron
- By Whose Hand? (1932) - Alice
- The Night Mayor (1932) - Nutsy
- White Eagle (1932) - Janet Rand
- Deception (1932) - Joan Allen
- Forbidden Trail (1932) - Mary Middleton
- Sundown Rider (1932) - Molly McCall
- Olsen's Big Moment (1933) - Jane Van Allen
- State Trooper (1933) - Estelle
- Soldiers of the Storm (1933) - Spanish waitress
- Rusty Rides Alone (1933) - Mollie Martin
- My Weakness (1933) - Lois Crowley
- The Quitter (1934) - Diana Winthrop
- The Crosby Case (1934) - Nora
- School for Girls (1934) - Nell Davis
- Woman Unafraid (1934) - Mary Sloan
- Now I'll Tell (1934) - Wynne
- She Was a Lady (1934) - Moira
- When Strangers Meet (1934) - Elaine
- Pick a Star (1937) - Hostess (uncredited)
- Two-Fisted Sheriff (1937) - Molly Herrick
- One Man Justice (1937) - Mary Crockett
- The Old Wyoming Trail (1937) - Elsie Halliday
- Dramatic School (1938) - Student (uncredited)
- Paris Honeymoon (1939) - Julieska (uncredited)
- Dad Rudd, MP (1940) - Sybil Vane
- The Violent Years (1956) - Jane Parkins
- Gun Girls (1957) - Teddy's Mother (final film role)
