= Follow the Sun (film) =

1951 film by Sidney Lanfield

- Theatrical release poster
- Directed by: Sidney Lanfield
- Written by: Frederick Hazlitt Brennan
- Produced by: Samuel G. Engel
- Starring: Glenn Ford; Anne Baxter; Dennis O'Keefe; June Havoc
- Cinematography: Leo Tover
- Edited by: Barbara McLean
- Music by: Cyril J. Mockridge
- Distributed by: Twentieth Century-Fox
- Release dates: April 25, 1951 (New York); May 4, 1951 (Los Angeles)
- Running time: 93 minutes
- Country: United States
- Language: English
- Box office: $1,150,000 (US rentals)

Follow the Sun is a 1951 biographical film of the life of golf legend Ben Hogan, directed by Sidney Lanfield and starring Glenn Ford as Hogan and Anne Baxter as his wife. Many golfers and sports figures of the day appear in the film.

== Plot ==
In Fort Worth, Texas, young Ben Hogan works as a golf caddy and dreams of becoming a professional golfer. As an adult, Hogan marries childhood sweetheart Valerie Fox and joins the pro golfers' tour. Fellow pro Chuck Williams befriends Hogan and becomes his mentor. Hogan offends noted sportswriter Jay Dexter, who mistakes Hogan's attitude for arrogance. Hogan has trouble concentrating and freezes on the course, and he considers abandoning the sport, but Valerie encourages him to remain. They travel around the country playing in many tournaments. Down to his last $5 and weary of a diet of oranges, Hogan wins $285 at a tournament and Valerie, seemingly overcoming his concentration issues. However, the price of Ben's concentration is a reputation of aloofness.

Hogan's career prospers in the next few years but is interrupted by his service in World War II. When he returns, he becomes a great champion but is still unable to talk to fans or enjoy himself, and he has acquired an image in the media of a robotic, cold competitor with the nickname of the "Texas Iceberg". He envies Williams' easy way with fans. At a tournament at Pebble Beach, Hogan's intense concentration causes him to miss his former commanding officer General Richardson and later chastises himself for failing to play golf and acknowledge the gallery at the same time.

Hogan is now the top money winner on the tour. At a tournament in Los Angeles, he competes directly against and defeats Williams, who has developed a drinking problem that is threatening his marriage.

In 1949, on a foggy drive to Fort Worth to a new home that Valerie has bought, they collide with a bus. Hogan throws himself in front of his wife to protect her, which also saves him, as the steering wheel impaled the driver's seat. Hogan has serious injuries to his pelvis, legs and shoulder. The doctors are afraid of clot formation and the necessary specialist is in New Orleans. Valerie calls Richardson and he arranges for a plane to fly there. The operations are successful, but Hogan faces a long road to recovery.

Hogan is amazed by the outpouring of wishes from his fans, His hospital room is flooded with flowers, cards and letters, and he wishes to play again for the benefit of the fans. Williams and his wife Norma, now happily reconciled, together, visit Hogan with golf legends Jimmy Demaret and Cary Middlecoff, who tell Hogan that he is to be captain of the team when they play against England for the Ryder Cup, regardless of whether he can play.

Through determination and exercise, Hogan progresses enough to return home, where he steadily recovers. He tries practicing at a driving range but falls in pain. Valerie is afraid and angry, as the doctors had warned him to avoid golf because of the danger of clots. After watching him suffer sitting alone at home wishing he could play, she changes her mind.

Newspaper headlines announce that Hogan will play in the 1950 Los Angeles Open, the opening event of the season. Williams, who has withdrawn from the tournament because sobriety had left him unsteady, visits Hogan in the locker room to offer encouragement. The large gallery is rooting for Hogan, and he plays well even in heavy rain. He ends with a score of 69 for the final round but Sam Snead matches his score, forcing a playoff. Hogan loses to Snead but is applauded and honored at a sportswriters' tribute dinner. Hogan delivers an emotional speech and is featured on the cover of Time magazine.

== Cast ==
- Glenn Ford as Ben Hogan
- Anne Baxter as Valerie Hogan
- Dennis O'Keefe as Chuck Williams
- June Havoc as Norma Williams
- Larry Keating as Jay Dexter
- Roland Winters as Dr. Graham
- Nana Bryant as Sister Beatrice
- Harold Blake as Ben Hogan, Age 14
- Ann Burr as Valerie, Age 14
- Jimmy Demaret as Himself
- Cary Middlecoff as Himself
- Grantland Rice as Himself, Toastmaster
- Sam Snead as Himself
- Harry G. Reader Jr. as Williams' Caddy

== Production ==
Frederick Hazlitt Brennan, who wrote the screenplay, also wrote a companion short story titled "He Follows the Sun Again" that was published in Reader's Digest in March 1951.

Ben Hogan served as a special technical consultant throughout production.

== Reception ==
In a contemporary review for The New York Times, critic Thomas M. Pryor wrote: "'Follow the Sun' ... should measure up as a heartwarming film experience. ... For in dramatizing the life of one of the noblest Texans in sports, Twentieth Century-Fox has come up with a story of courage that is inspiring and should lighten the hearts of all who are weighted with adversities".

Critic Edwin Schallert of the Los Angeles Times wrote: "There is oftentimes high emotional intensity in this picture, and a fascination too about its scenes on the golf course. The characters are well drawn in the screen play ... This is a very good story of a man's fighting back. It may not have quite as much to offer in a popular way as 'The Stratton Story.' But its emotional power is tremendously brought out, and its feminine appeal because of Miss Baxter's part in the picture is strong. Preliminaries dally at times, but everything is excellent once the main story is under way."

== Radio adaptation ==
Follow the Sun was presented on Lux Radio Theatre on March 10, 1952 as a one-hour adaptation starring Anne Baxter and Gary Merrill.
