= Shadow of the Law (1930 film) =

1930 film

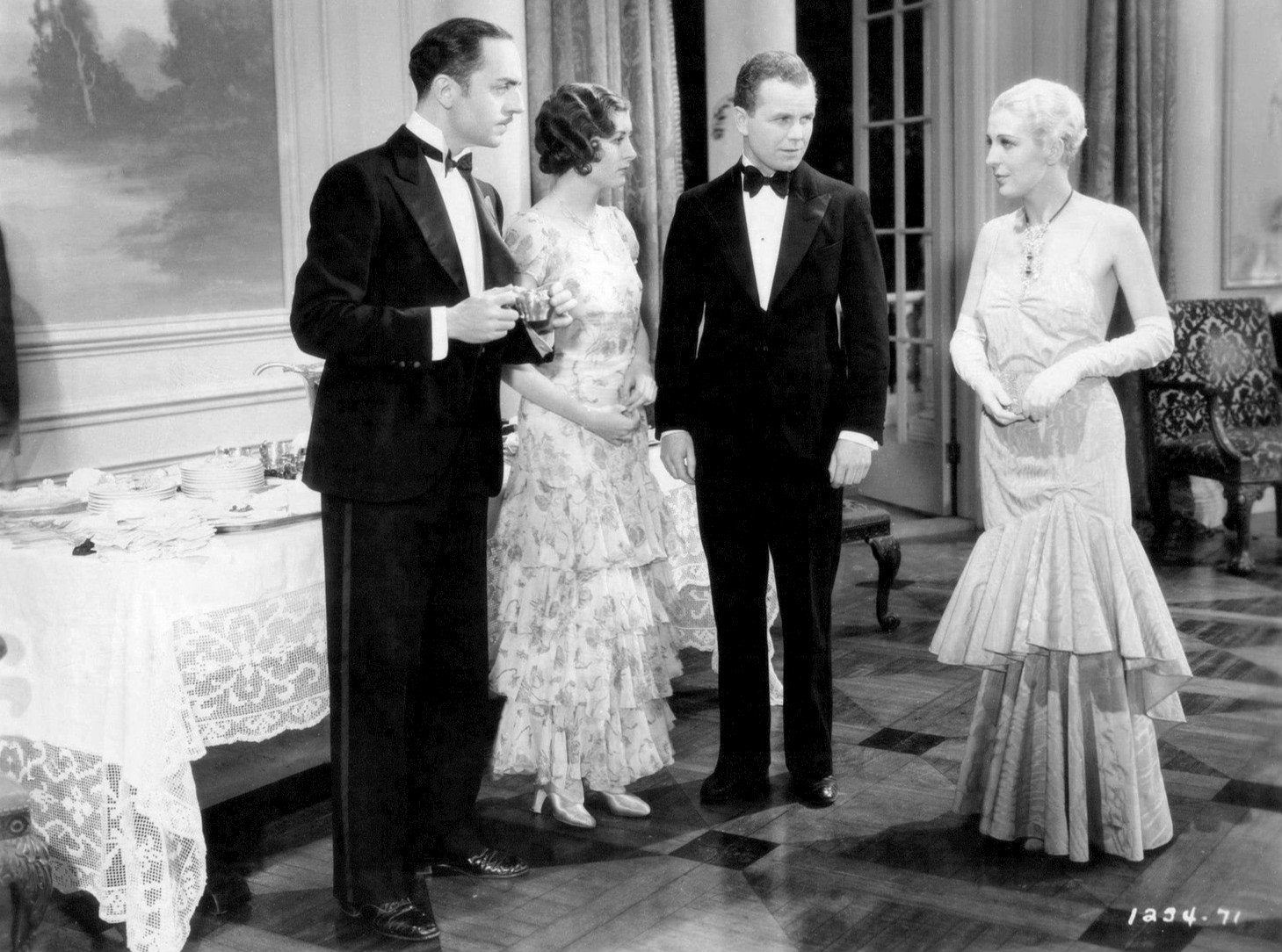
- Left to right: William Powell, Marion Shilling, Regis Toomey and Natalie Moorhead at Colonel Wentworth's party.
- Directed by: Louis J. Gasnier
- Screenplay by: John Farrow; John A. Moroso (novel); Max Marcin (play)
- Based on: the novel The Quarry by John A. Moroso
- Starring: William Powell
- Cinematography: Charles Lang
- Release date: June 30, 1930
- Running time: 69 minutes
- Country: United States
- Language: English

Shadow of the Law is a 1930 American pre-Code film directed by Louis J. Gasnier and starring William Powell, Richard Tucker, and Regis Toomey.

== Plot ==
Mechanical engineer James "Jim" Montgomery escorts attractive blonde Ethel George to her apartment, one floor up from where he himself lives. However, inside she is startled to find an angry Lew Durkin, a "Chicago millionaire". Jim leaves, but later she flees to his place, chased by Durkin. When Durkin starts strangling the woman, Jim intervenes. In the ensuing fight, Jim punches Durkin, who then falls out the window to his death. Anxious to avoid the scandal and publicity, the woman runs away.

When Police Lieutenant Mike Kearney arrives, Jim makes a mistake and claims there was nobody else in the room. When Kearney tells him that an eyewitness saw him push Durkin out the window, he tells the truth, but Kearney does not believe his changed story. They go upstairs to see Miss George, but she is gone. Without her testimony, Jim is convicted and sent to prison for life.

He shares a cell with Pete for three years. Then the warden asks him to find out who Pete's accomplices were and the hiding place of the loot from a robbery Pete is suspected of having committed, giving him a trustee's cushy job and dangling the possibility of "executive clemency". However, Jim tells Pete right away. Pete has been plotting an escape, but he convinces Jim to take his place instead, as Pete only has two more years to serve. Jim gets away.

Two years later, Jim is in Suffolk, North Carolina, working as mill manager "John Nelson". His girlfriend, Edith Wentworth, is the daughter of the mill's owner. Jim is reunited with his friend Pete. Private detectives have located Ethel George, but now he needs someone he can trust completely to go see her in New York and make her tell the truth. Despite his distrust of all "Janes", Pete agrees to do it.

Ethel "Barry" at first denies being Ethel George, but changes her mind after Pete tells her that Jim has become successful and can pay a lot of money. However, when Pete leaves, she telephones the police, having obtained from Pete where Jim is living. Pete is picked up, questioned by Kearney and jailed on suspicion of robbery when Pete refuses to say where he got $5000. Kearney has the new bills traced.

Meanwhile, Ethel shows up at Colonel Wentworth's party. She tells Jim privately that she wants $50,000, a sum he does not have, but she points out that Colonel Wentworth would pay that much to protect his daughter. Jim decides to quit his job, but when Edith confronts him, he tells her everything. She then tells her father that he is not leaving after all. Colonel Wentworth is delighted with his future son-in-law. Then Kearney shows up. Jim desperately claims he is not the escaped convict. When Ethel comes in, Jim offers her the $50,000, but having been told that Kearney is a police officer, she claims Jim is trying to bribe her to commit perjury. To temporarily avoid being identified by his fingerprints, Jim deliberately injures his hands in some mill machinery. Kearney decides to take a chance that Jim is telling the truth and promises to get the truth out of Ethel.

== Cast ==
- William Powell as Jim Montgomery / John Nelson
- Marion Shilling as Edith Wentworth
- Natalie Moorhead as Miss Barry
- Regis Toomey as Tom Owens
- Paul Hurst as Pete
- George Irving as Colonel Wentworth
- Frederick Burt as Mike Kearney
- James Durkin as Warden
- Richard Tucker as Lew Durkin
- Walter James as Captain of the Guards

== Reception ==
Mordaunt Hall, critic for The New York Times, called the movie "an interesting but albeit somewhat implausible talking pictorial melodrama" and praised the actors: "Mr. Powell's acting is capital. So is that of Paul Hurst, who plays Pete. Natalie Moorehead does well as the strange Ethel Barry."
