= Speakeasy (1929 film) =

1929 film

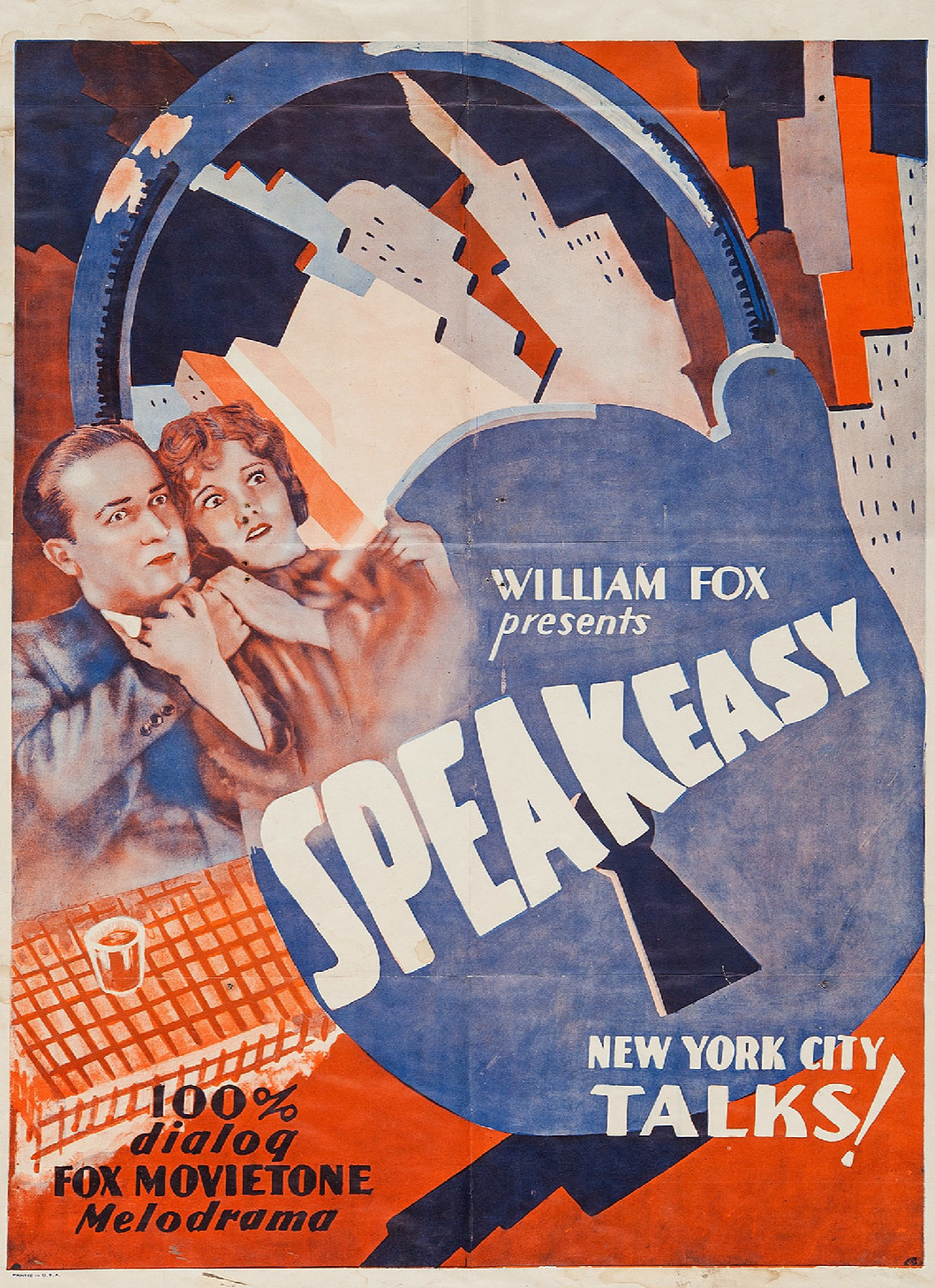
- Theatrical release poster
- Directed by: Benjamin Stoloff
- Written by: Frederick Hazlitt Brennan; Edwin J. Burke
- Based on: Speakeasy by George Rosener and Edward Knoblock
- Produced by: William Fox
- Starring: Paul Page; Lola Lane; Henry B. Walthall; Helen Ware; Sharon Lynn
- Cinematography: Joseph A. Valentine
- Edited by: J. Edwin Robbins
- Production company: Fox Film Corporation
- Distributed by: Fox Film Corporation
- Release date: March 8, 1929 (U.S.)
- Running time: 62 minutes
- Country: United States
- Language: English

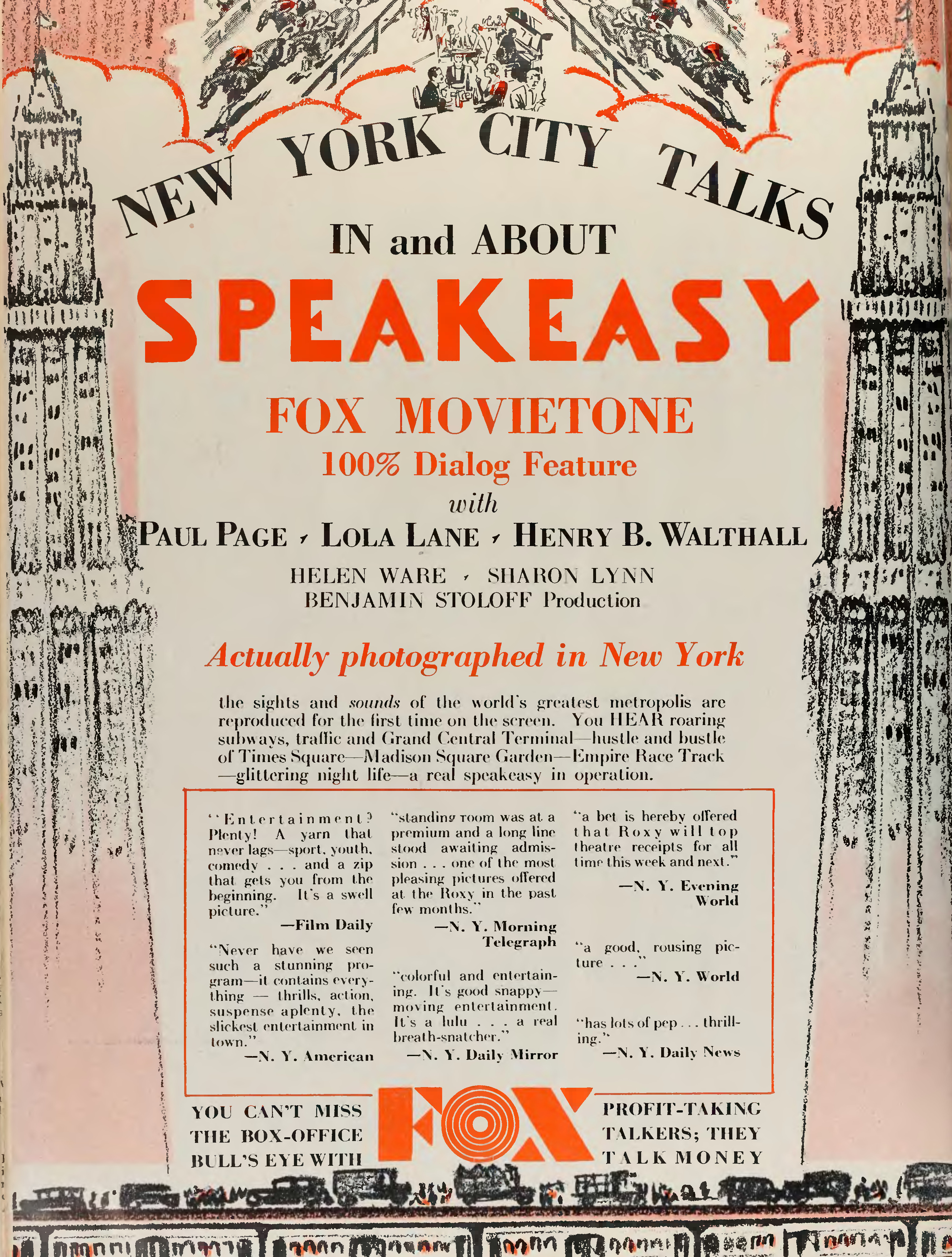
"Speakeasy" ad from The Film Daily, 1929

Speakeasy is a 1929 American pre-Code sports drama film directed by Benjamin Stoloff and adapted by Frederick Hazlitt Brennan and Edwin J. Burke. The picture was produced and distributed by Fox Film Corporation. Lola Lane and Paul Page played the lead roles. John Wayne had a minor role in the film as a speakeasy patron. All film elements to this movie are considered lost, but Movietone discs of the soundtrack survive.

== Plot ==
In the bustling newsroom of a New York daily, tempers flare. A staff reporter has bungled a story, and the irate City Editor threatens to fire him. Amid the chaos, spirited young journalist Alice Woods pleads for a chance to prove herself. She convinces the editor to let her pursue an exclusive interview with middleweight champion Paul Martin, a college-educated pugilist who, win or lose, intends to retire after his upcoming fight.

Alice sets out with fellow reporter Cy Williams, whose sluggish, deadpan wit provides comic counterpoint.

That evening, Martin steps into Madison Square Garden before a roaring crowd. The arena, captured with Fox Movietone’s cameras, is shown in thrilling actuality—thousands of fans, the clang of the bell, the blows landing. Martin, however, falters and loses his title.

Afterward, Alice and Cy track him to his hangout, a bustling underground speakeasy run by Min, a tempestuous and sharp-tongued hostess who knows all the rackets. The entrance is disguised as a telephone booth, and a hidden peephole scan admits the pair inside.

Inside, smoke, chatter, and jazz fill the room. A sultry café singer, Mazie, entertains by singing, her flirtatious manner matched by her fickle affections. Around the tables sit mobsters, gamblers, and hangers-on—including the cynical speakeasy pianist, who has seen too much of life but still provides a melancholy running commentary through music.

At the center is Cannon Delmont, Martin’s crooked manager. Delmont runs rackets, protects speakeasies, and has a yen for Alice. He resents her presence, insults her, and works to keep Martin under his control.

At first, Martin rebuffs Alice, weary of newspapermen and suspicious of her motives. But Alice’s sincerity disarms him. She reveals what she has uncovered: Delmont has been double-crossing him, arranging fixes and profiting at Martin’s expense. With her encouragement, Martin regains his pride and considers fighting again, not just for himself but to prove his worth.

Their friendship grows. Martin shields Alice from Delmont’s advances, while Alice bolsters his wavering confidence. For Alice, the disillusioned fighter becomes more than a story—he becomes a man she believes in.

Delmont and his underworld allies plot to keep control of Martin. They manipulate the betting on his fights and conspire to sideline Alice. When Martin lands a rematch opportunity, Delmont raises the stakes by having Alice abducted and locked in Min’s upstairs room. Min, torn between loyalty to Delmont and sympathy for Alice, confesses the scheme to the old pianist.

When Delmont tries to force his way into Alice’s room, the pianist intervenes. In a moment of grim sacrifice, the old man shoots Delmont, preventing him from harming Alice. He pays with his own life, struck down in the violent confrontation, his piano silenced.

Alice, freed by Min, rushes to Madison Square Garden, where Martin is already in the ring, struggling against the reigning champion. The fight sequences are vividly staged with actual Garden footage—an island of white canvas in a sea of black-clad spectators, with the roar of the crowd and the crash of punches filling the soundtrack.

Martin, disheartened and nearly beaten, sees Alice at ringside. Her presence transforms him. With renewed energy, he fights back furiously, flooring his opponent with a knockout blow.

Martin regains the championship and, with it, the promise of a new life. Alice, her story written not in headlines but in devotion, has redeemed him from corruption. Cy provides his wry commentary, Mazie moves on to her next conquest, and Min, chastened, runs her speakeasy with a quieter edge.

Amid the bustle of the city—the subway crowds, Grand Central Station, Times Square at night—Martin and Alice walk together, the future ahead of them.

== Cast ==
- Lola Lane as Alice Woods
- Paul Page as Paul Martin
- Sharon Lynn as Mazie
- Warren Hymer as Cannon Delmont
- Helen Ware as Min
- Henry B. Walthall as piano player
- Stuart Erwin as Cy Williams
- Erville Alderson as City Editor
- Joseph Cawthorn as Yokel
- Ivan Linow as Wrestler
- Marjorie Beebe as Speakeasy Patron
- Sailor Vincent as Speakeasy Patron
- Helen Lynch as Speakeasy Patron
- John Wayne as Speakeasy Patron

== See also ==
- List of early sound feature films (1926–1929)
- List of lost films
