= The Girl from Havana =

1929 film

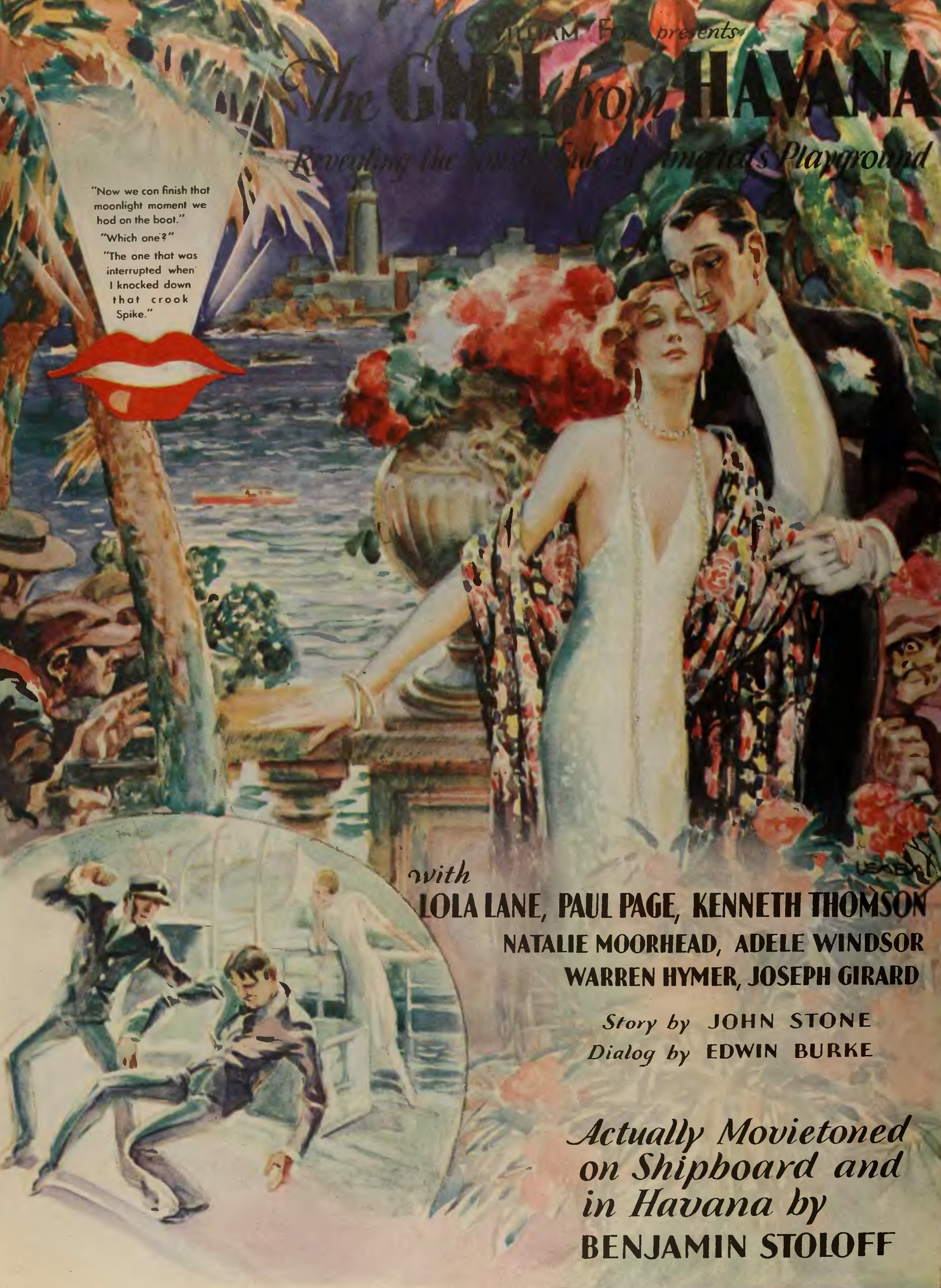
- Directed by: Benjamin Stoloff
- Screenplay by: Edwin J. Burke
- Story by: John Stone
- Starring: Lola Lane; Paul Page; Kenneth Thomson; Natalie Moorhead; Warren Hymer; Joseph W. Girard
- Cinematography: Joseph A. Valentine
- Edited by: Paul Weatherwax
- Production company: Fox Film Corporation
- Distributed by: Fox Film Corporation
- Release date: September 22, 1929
- Running time: 65 minutes
- Country: United States
- Languages: Sound (All-Talking); English

The Girl from Havana is a 1929 American sound (All-Talking) pre-Code crime film directed by Benjamin Stoloff and written by Edwin J. Burke. The film stars Lola Lane, Paul Page, Kenneth Thomson, Natalie Moorhead, Warren Hymer and Joseph W. Girard. The film was released on September 22, 1929, by Fox Film Corporation.

== Cast ==
- Lola Lane as Joan Anders
- Paul Page as Allan Grant
- Kenneth Thomson as William Dane
- Natalie Moorhead as Lona Martin
- Warren Hymer as Spike Howard
- Joseph W. Girard as Dougherty
- Adele Windsor as Babe Hanson
- Marcia Chapman as Sally Green
- Dorothy Brown as Toots Nolan
- Juan Sedillo as Detective
- Raymond López as Joe Barker

== Music ==
The film features a theme song entitled "Time Will Tell" with words by L. Wolfe Gilbert and music by Abel Baer.

== See also ==
- List of early sound feature films (1926–1929)
