= Wings over Honolulu =

1937 film by H. C. Potter

- Directed by: H. C. Potter
- Screenplay by: Isabel Dawn; Boyce DeGaw
- Story by: Mildred Cram ("Redbook Magazine")
- Produced by: E.M. Asher
- Starring: Wendy Barrie; Ray Milland; Kent Taylor; William Gargan; Polly Rowles
- Cinematography: Joseph Valentine
- Edited by: Maurice Wright
- Production company: Universal Pictures
- Distributed by: Universal Pictures
- Release date: May 16, 1937 (United States)
- Running time: 78 minutes
- Country: United States
- Language: English

Wings over Honolulu is a 1937 American romantic drama film directed by H. C. Potter and starring Wendy Barrie, Ray Milland, Kent Taylor, William Gargan, and Polly Rowles.

The cinematographer Joseph Valentine earned a nomination for the Academy Award for Best Cinematography for his work on this military romance, with Wendy Barrie as a young woman who finds it difficult to adjust to the life of a Naval aviator's wife.

== Plot ==
Lauralee Curtis is introduced to a Navy lieutenant, pilot Sam "Stony" Gilchrist, at her 20th-birthday party. It is love at first sight. Two days later, they are husband and wife.

Stony's next base will be in Honolulu, Hawaii, but at the last minute, he receives orders to drop everything and fly to Washington, D.C. He kisses his new bride goodbye and she boards a ship to Honolulu by herself. On board, Lauralee encounters an admiral's daughter, Rosalind Furness, who treats her coldly. The admiral explains that everyone had assumed Rosalind would be the one to marry Stony.

By the time the ship reaches port, Rosalind has made it abundantly clear to Lauralee that she is standing by in case the marriage does not work out. Lauralee becomes lonely in Honolulu until she runs into an old friend, Greg, and begins socializing with him.

Complications ensue until Lauralee ultimately believes she must leave Stony because she is harmful to his career. When she and Greg are aboard a sailboat, Stony buzzes them in his plane and ends up in a military courtroom, his career at risk. Rosalind gloats that now Stony can be hers, but he goes after Lauralee and all ends well.

== Cast ==
- Wendy Barrie as Lauralee Curtis
- Ray Milland as Lieutenant "Stoney" Gilchrist
- Kent Taylor as Gregory Chandler
- William Gargan as Lieutenant Jack Furness
- Polly Rowles as Rosalind Furness
- Mary Philips as Hattie Penletter
- Samuel S. Hinds as Admiral Furness
- Margaret McWade as Nellie Curtis
- Clara Blandick as Evie Curtis
- Joyce Compton as Caroline
- Louise Beavers as Mammy

== Production ==
The setting for the film is at Naval Air Station North Island.
