= Captain Thunder =

Captain Thunder may refer to:

- Captain Thunder (film), 1930 starring Victor Varconi in the title role
- Capitán Trueno, the hero of a series of Spanish comic books by Víctor Mora
- Captain Thunder (DC Comics), an alternate version of Captain Marvel, as well as an early name for the character.

== See also ==
- Captain Thunderbolt
