= Aflame in the Sky =

1927 film directed by J.P. McGowan

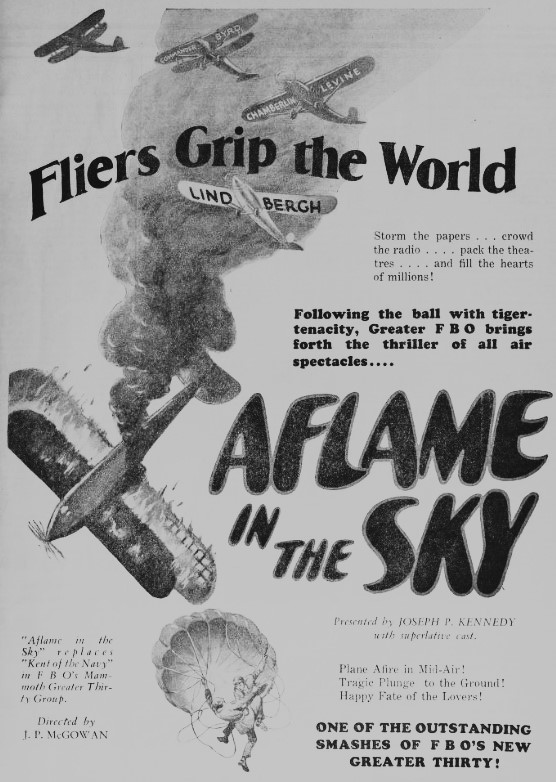
- Advertisement
- Directed by: J.P. McGowan
- Written by: Ewart Adamson
- Story by: Mary Roberts Rinehart
- Produced by: Joseph P. Kennedy
- Starring: Sharon Lynn; Jack Luden; William Humphrey
- Cinematography: Joseph Walker
- Production company: Robertson-Cole Pictures Corporation
- Distributed by: Film Booking Offices of America
- Release date: November 28, 1927
- Running time: 6 reels
- Country: United States
- Language: Silent (English intertitles)

Aflame in the Sky is a lost 1927 American silent adventure film directed by J.P. McGowan and starring Sharon Lynn, Jack Luden, and William Humphrey.

== Cast ==
- Sharon Lynn as Inez Carillo
- Jack Luden as Terry Owen
- William Humphrey as Major Savage
- Robert McKim as Joseph Murdoch
- William Scott as Saunders
- Charles A. Stevenson as Grandfather
- Billy Franey as Cookie
- Mark Hamilton as Slim
- Walter Ackerman as Desert Rat
- Jane Keckley as Cordelia Murdoch

== Preservation ==
With no prints of Aflame in the Sky located in any film archives, it is a lost film.

== Bibliography ==
- McGowan, John J. (2005). J.P. McGowan: Biography of a Hollywood Pioneer. McFarland.
