= The One Woman Idea =

1929 film

- Directed by: Berthold Viertel
- Screenplay by: Marion Orth
- Based on: The One-Woman Idea by Alan Williams
- Starring: Rod La Rocque; Marceline Day; Shirley Dorman; Sharon Lynn; Sally Phipps; Ivan Lebedeff
- Cinematography: L. William O'Connell
- Music by: Arthur Kay
- Production company: Fox Film Corporation
- Distributed by: Fox Film Corporation
- Release date: June 2, 1929
- Running time: 65 minutes
- Country: United States
- Languages: Sound (Synchronized) (English intertitles)

The One Woman Idea is a 1929 American Synchronized sound drama film directed by Berthold Viertel and written by Marion Orth. While the film has no audible dialog, it was released with a synchronized musical score with sound effects using the sound-on-film Movietone process. The film stars Rod La Rocque, Marceline Day, Shirley Dorman, Sharon Lynn, Sally Phipps and Ivan Lebedeff. The film was released on June 2, 1929, by Fox Film Corporation.

== Cast ==
- Rod La Rocque as Prince Ahmed
- Marceline Day as Lady Alicia Douglas / Alizar
- Shirley Dorman as Boat Passenger
- Sharon Lynn as Boat Passenger
- Sally Phipps as Boat Passenger
- Ivan Lebedeff as Hosainn
- Douglas Gilmore as Lord Douglas
- Gino Corrado as Bordinnas
- Joseph W. Girard as Steamship Captain
- Arnold Lucy as Ali
- Françoise Rosay as Zuleide
- Jamiel Hasson as Bodyguard
- Tom Tamarez as Bodyguard
- Coy Watson Jr. as Buttons

== See also ==
- List of early sound feature films (1926–1929)
