= Curlytop =

1924 film directed by Maurice Elvey

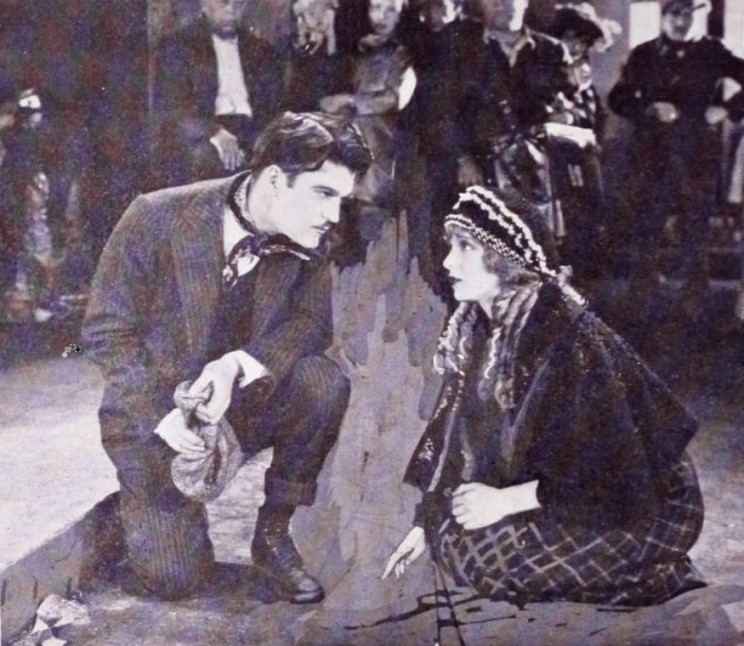
- Still
- Directed by: Maurice Elvey
- Written by: Fanny Hatton; Frederic Hatton
- Based on: "Twelve Golden Curls"; 1921 story in More Limehouse Nights by Thomas Burke
- Produced by: William Fox
- Starring: Shirley Mason; Wallace MacDonald; Warner Oland
- Cinematography: Joseph A. Valentine
- Production company: Fox Film Corporation
- Distributed by: Fox Film Corporation
- Release date: December 28, 1924
- Running time: 60 minutes
- Country: United States
- Language: Silent (English intertitles)

Curlytop is a lost 1924 American silent romantic drama film directed by Maurice Elvey and starring Shirley Mason, Wallace MacDonald, and Warner Oland. It is based on one of the short stories collected in More Limehouse Nights by Thomas Burke.

== Plot ==
As described in a review in a film magazine, big Bill Branigan (MacDonald) leaves his sweetheart Bessie (Miller) for Curlytop (Mason), whose unconscious beauty naiveté enthrall him. Shanghai Dan (Oland), who dominates a gang of Chinese crooks in the Chinatown centered on Limehouse in the East End of London, also desires her. Determined to reform, Bill sets out in search of a job, so Bessie revenges herself by getting Curlytop drunk and cutting off her golden curls. Bill returns but cannot find Curlytop, and is persuaded to rekindle his relationship with Bessie. After he finds the golden curls among her belongings, Bill forces Bessie to reveal the whereabouts of Curlytop. Curlytop has been working for Shanghai Dan as a waitress on a floating barge. As Dan is hypnotizing her, another vessel crashes into the barge. Dan is drowned while Curlytop is rescued by Bill.

== Cast ==
- Shirley Mason as Curlytop
- Wallace MacDonald as Bill Branigan
- Warner Oland as Shanghai Dan
- Diana Miller as Bessie
- George Kuwa as Wang Toy
- Ernie Adams as Sproggs
- Nora Hayden as Hilda
- Sharon Lynn as Annie (credited as Lindsay La Verne)

== Preservation ==
With no prints of Curlytop located in any film archives, it is a lost film.

== Bibliography ==
- Solomon, Aubrey. The Fox Film Corporation, 1915-1935: A History and Filmography. McFarland, 2011.
