= The Moth (1934 film) =

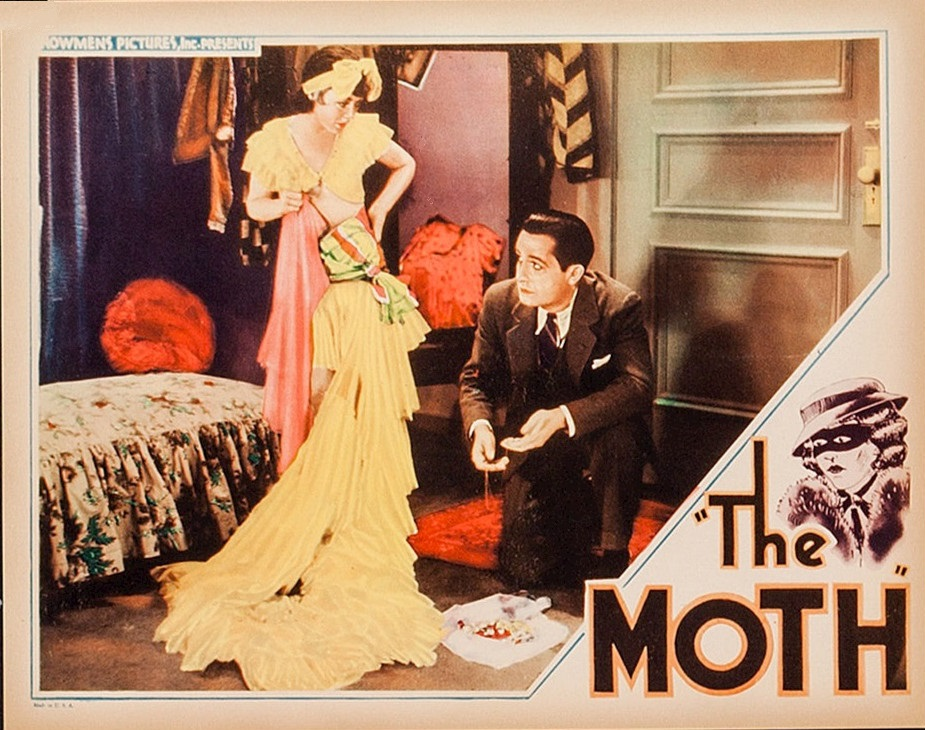
- Lobby card
- Directed by: Fred C. Newmeyer
- Written by: Joseph O'Donnell
- Produced by: Al Alt; C.C. Burr
- Cinematography: George Meehan
- Edited by: S. Roy Luby
- Distributed by: Showmen's Pictures, Inc.
- Release date: January 15, 1934
- Running time: 64 minutes
- Country: United States
- Language: English

The Moth is a 1934 American crime drama film directed by Fred C. Newmeyer. Sally O'Neil, Paul Page, and Wilfred Lucas had leading roles.

== Synopsis ==
Diane is an irresponsible, disinherited heiress who heads for New Orleans and crosses paths with a jewel thief who is a notorious criminal known as The Moth.

== Cast ==
- Sally O'Neil as Diana Wyman
- Paul Page as George Duncan
- Wilfred Lucas as John Gale
- Fred Kelsey as Detective Blake
- Duncan Renaldo as Don Pedro
- Rae Daggett as Marie LeMaire, The Moth
- Nina Guilbert as Auntie Jane Stevens
- Georgia O'Dell as Old Maid Train Passenger
- Jack Cheatham as 1st Desk Sergeant (uncredited)
