= Many a Slip (film) =

1931 film

- Directed by: Vin Moore
- Screenplay by: Edith Fitzgerald; Robert Riskin; Gladys Buchanan Unger
- Produced by: Carl Laemmle, Jr.
- Starring: Joan Bennett; Lew Ayres; Slim Summerville; Ben Alexander; Virginia Sale; Roscoe Karns
- Cinematography: Jerome Ash
- Edited by: Harry W. Lieb
- Music by: Heinz Roemheld
- Production company: Universal Pictures
- Distributed by: Universal Pictures
- Release date: March 2, 1931
- Running time: 64 minutes
- Country: United States
- Language: English

Many a Slip is a 1931 American pre-Code comedy film directed by Vin Moore and written by Edith Fitzgerald, Robert Riskin and Gladys Buchanan Unger. The film stars Joan Bennett, Lew Ayres, Slim Summerville, Ben Alexander, Virginia Sale and Roscoe Karns. The film was released in August 1931 by Universal Pictures.

== Cast ==
- Joan Bennett as Pat Coster
- Lew Ayres as Jerry Brooks
- Slim Summerville as Hopkins
- Ben Alexander as Ted Coster
- Virginia Sale as Smitty
- Roscoe Karns as Stan Price
- Vivien Oakland as Emily Coster
- J. C. Nugent as William Coster
