= Discarded Lovers =

1932 film

- Directed by: Fred C. Newmeyer
- Written by: Arthur Hoerl; Edward T. Lowe Jr.
- Cinematography: William Hyer
- Edited by: Charles J. Hunt
- Distributed by: Capitol Film Exchange
- Release date: January 3, 1932
- Running time: 60 minutes
- Country: United States
- Language: English

Discarded Lovers is a 1932 American pre-Code melodramatic murder-mystery film directed by Fred C. Newmeyer.

== Plot ==
A blonde bombshell movie star is murdered and her body is found in a car. She had just finished doing the last and final scenes in a film. Irma Gladden was a sexy blonde bombshell who was having many tangled romantic affairs. In solving the murder there are the usual friends, police, reporters and employees who administer their help to the police captain and the police sergeant. Suspects abound and include Irma's husband, a jealous wife, a boy friend and an ex-husband.

== Cast ==
- Natalie Moorhead as Irma Gladden
- Russell Hopton as Bob Adair
- J. Farrell MacDonald as Chief Sommers
- Barbara Weeks as Valerie Christine
- Jason Robards Sr. as Rex Forsythe
- Roy D'Arcy as Andre Leighton
- Sharon Lynn as Mrs. Sibley
- Fred Kelsey as Sgt. Delaney
- Robert Frazer as Warren Sibley
- Jack Trent as Ralph Norman, the chauffeur

== Reception ==
=== Critical reception ===
The Film Daily gave a positive review, and noting that it was an independent production, stated that "pictures of this calibre will make the larger companies sit up and take notice." They described the film as a "gripping mystery drama with a sweet romance and high entertainment value", and they praised the director, Fred Newmeyer, writing that he "has cleverly held suspense and mystery" and "turned out a sincere piece of work."
