= White Eagle (1932 film) =

1932 film by Lambert Hillyer

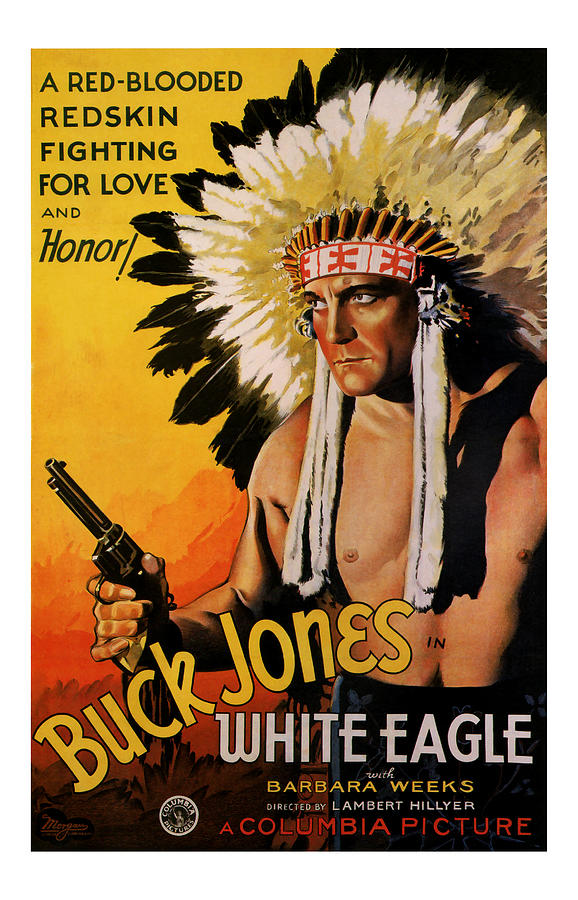
- Directed by: Lambert Hillyer
- Written by: Fred Myton
- Starring: Buck Jones; Barbara Weeks; Robert Ellis
- Cinematography: L. W. O'Connell
- Edited by: Gene Melford
- Production company: Columbia Pictures Corporation
- Distributed by: Columbia Pictures Corporation
- Release date: October 7, 1932
- Running time: 64 minutes
- Country: United States
- Language: English

White Eagle is a 1932 American pre-Code Western movie directed by Lambert Hillyer. The film stars Buck Jones, Barbara Weeks, and Robert Ellis. Columbia Pictures later adapted this film into a 1941 serial of the same title, also starring Buck Jones.

== Cast ==
- Buck Jones as White Eagle
- Barbara Weeks as Janet Rand
- Robert Ellis as Gregory
- Ward Bond as Bart
- Robert Elliott as Captain Blake
- Bob Kortman as Sheriff
- Frank Campeau as Gray Wolf
- Jimmy Howe as Zachariah Kershaw
- Jim Thorpe as Indian Chief
- Clarence Geldert as Doctor
- Silver as White Eagle's horse
