= Natalie Moorhead =

American actress (1901–1992)

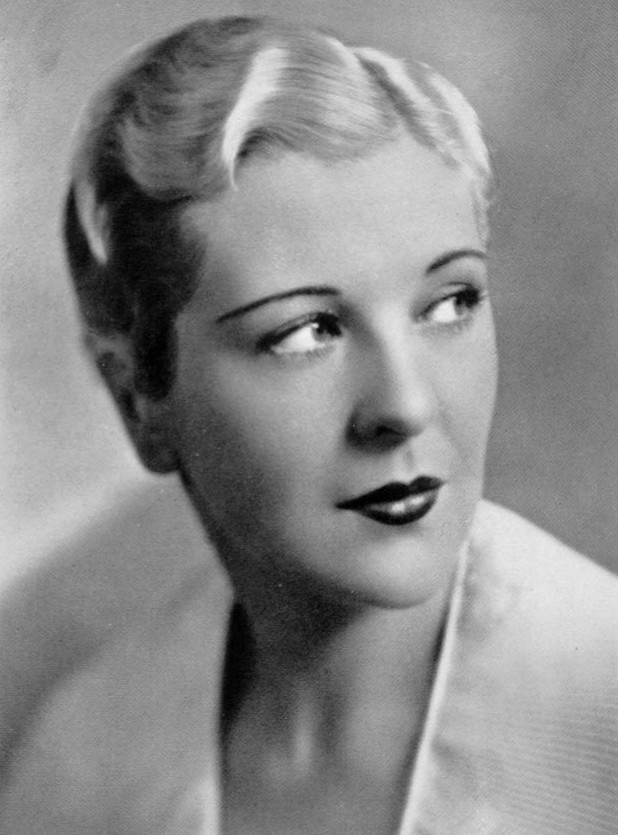
- Moorhead in a publicity portrait in 1930
- Born: Nathalian Moorhead; July 27, 1901; Pittsburgh, Pennsylvania, U.S.
- Died: October 6, 1992 (aged 91); Montecito, California, U.S.
- Resting place: Calvary Cemetery, Santa Barbara, California
- Occupation: Actress
- Years active: 1927–1941
- Spouses: Raymond Phillips (m. 1929; div. 1930) Alan Crosland (m. 1930; div. 1935) Robert J. Dunham (m. 1942; died 1948) Juan Garchitorena (m. 1957; died 1983)

Natalie Moorhead (born Nathalian Moorhead, (July 27, 1901 – October 6, 1992) was an American film and stage actress. As a performer, she was known for her distinctive short platinum blond hair.

Born and raised in Pittsburgh, Pennsylvania, Moorhead gained an appreciation for theater and the opera from her father during her adolescence. After enrolling in a business school to pursue being a secretary for the government during World War I, Moorhead was discovered during a shopping trip on Fifth Avenue; thus beginning her career in theater. A 1927 production of Baby Cyclone, with her starring alongside a young Spencer Tracy, landed her in Hollywood. She began obtaining small film roles in the late 1920s, and was typically typecast in exotic roles, often as a vamp or "the other woman".

Her performances peaked in the 1930s, with films like The Benson Murder Case (1930), Shadow of the Law (1930), Hook, Line and Sinker (1930) opposite Wheeler and Woolsey, Parlor, Bedroom and Bath (1931) opposite Buster Keaton, and The Thin Man (1934). However, she retired from acting in the early 1940s after marrying her third husband, Chicago-based millionaire Robert J. Dunham. After his death in 1948, she remarried in 1957 to famed soccer champion and actor, Juan Garchitorena, and remained married until his death in 1983. Moorhead privately died in October 1992 in Montecito, California, at age 91.

== Early years ==
Moorhead was born Nathalian Moorhead on July 27, 1901 in Pittsburgh, Pennsylvania; the second daughter to Anna Catherine (née Messner) and James Vincent Moorhead. A tomboy from a young age, she was likely nicknamed 'Natalie' by the boy-filled gangs she frequented. Natalie gained an appreciation for theatre and the opera from her father, a steelworker who tragically died when she was around thirteen.

During the First World War, secretarial government jobs for women were becoming hugely popular, as the men who originally occupied them were drafted. Upon graduating from Peabody High School in Pittsburgh, Natalie enrolled in a business school to study shorthand and typewriting, but secretly yearned for a career on-stage. Upon taking a trip with friends to New York City to see a football game, she was scouted by a theatre executive while shopping on Fifth Avenue, and leapt at the opportunity.

== Career ==
She began her theatre career on Broadway at the Fulton Theatre; playing a bridesmaid in the 1922 play, Abie's Irish Rose, which broke viewership records for the run of the play; finally closing at the Theatre Republic on October 1, 1927. She then played alongside Sydney Greenstreet in A Lady in Love (1927) at the Lyceum Theatre, and with a young Spencer Tracy in George M. Cohan's 1927 farce Baby Cyclone at Henry Miller's Theatre.

Baby Cyclone caught the attention of Hollywood, with Moorhead making her silver screen debut in Thru Different Eyes (1929); a courtroom drama that also served as fellow actress Sylvia Sidney's debut. Throughout her 12-year career in Hollywood, Moorhead averaged six movies a year. Known for her distinctive short platinum blond hair and frequent casting as "the other woman", she is arguably best remembered for her minor role in the beginning of The Thin Man (1934). It was the first of two Best Picture nominees that she starred in; the other being All This, and Heaven Too (1940).

Unlike some of her early-talkie contemporaries, Moorhead and her career did not descend into lower-budgeted films for lesser companies. Although her later films were less important in stature, they were still major-studio productions and she was still a prominent featured player.

== Personal life ==
On December 21, 1930, Moorhead married director Alan Crosland in Yosemite National Park. She sued him for divorce on July 2, 1935. Upon stepping away from the spotlight, Moorhead married millionaire Robert J. Dunham; then-sixty-six year old president of the Chicago Park District, on March 28, 1942, in Maricopa, Arizona. He died in 1948. Moorhead's fourth husband was Juan Garchitorena, an actor (under the stage name Juan Torena) and former soccer player. They wed on July 27, 1957, in Beverly Hills, and remained married until his death in 1983.

On October 6, 1992, Moorhead died in Montecito, California.

== Selected filmography ==
- Thru Different Eyes (1929) - Frances Thornton
- The Unholy Night (1929) - Lady Violet Montague
- The Girl from Havana (1929) - Lona Martin
- The Furies (1930) - Caroline Leigh
- The Benson Murder Case (1930) - Fanny Del Roy
- Spring Is Here (1930) - Rita Conway
- Show Girl in Hollywood (1930) - Blonde Actress with Frank Buelow at Premiere (uncredited)
- The Runaway Bride (1930) - Clara Muldoon
- Shadow of the Law (1930) - Ethel Barry aka Ethel George
- Hot Curves (1930) - Maizie
- Manslaughter (1930) - Eleanor Bellington
- Ladies Must Play (1930) - Connie
- The Office Wife (1930) - Linda Fellowes
- Divorce Among Friends (1930) - Joan Whitley
- Hook, Line and Sinker (1930) - Duchess Bessie Van Essie
- Captain Thunder (1930) - Bonita
- Dance, Fools, Dance (1931) - Della
- Illicit (1931) - Margie True
- Parlor, Bedroom and Bath (1931) - Leila Crofton
- Women Men Marry (1931) - Dolly Moulton
- My Past (1931) - Consuelo 'Connie' Byrne
- The Phantom of Paris (1931) - Vera
- Morals for Women (1931) - Flora
- The Deceiver (1931) - Mrs. Lawton
- Maker of Men (1931) - Mrs. Rhodes
- Discarded Lovers (1932) - Irma Gladden
- Three Wise Girls (1932) - Ruth Dexter
- The Menace (1932) - Caroline Quayle
- Cross-Examination (1932) - Inez Wells
- Love Bound (Murder on the High Seas) (1932) - Verna Wilson, alias Vera Wendall
- The Stoker (1932) - Vera Martin
- The King Murder (1932) - Elizabeth Hawthorn
- The Fighting Gentleman (1932) - Violet Reed
- Forgotten (1933) - Myrtle Strauss
- The Mind Reader (1933) - Mrs. Austin
- Private Detective 62 (1933) - Helen Burns
- Corruption (1933) - Sylvia Gorman
- Dance Hall Hostess (1933) - Clare
- The Big Chance (1933) - Babe
- Curtain at Eight (1933) - Alma Jenkins Thornton
- Gigolettes of Paris (1933) - Diane Valraine
- Secret Sinners (1933) - Mrs. Gilbert
- Only Yesterday (1933) - Lucy (uncredited)
- Long Lost Father (1934) - Phyllis Mersey-Royds
- Dancing Man (1934) - Tamara Trevor
- The Thin Man (1934) - Julia Wolf
- Fifteen Wives (1934) - Carol Manning
- The Curtain Falls (1934) - Katherine Scorsby
- Champagne for Breakfast (1935) - Mrs. Morton
- Two in a Crowd (1936) - Mrs. Anthony (uncredited)
- 15 Maiden Lane (1936) - Nellie - Society Crook (uncredited)
- What Becomes of the Children? (1936) - Edith Worthington
- King of Gamblers (1937) - Woman at Table (uncredited)
- The Adventurous Blonde (1937) - Theresa Gray
- Heart of Arizona (1938) - Belle Starr
- The Beloved Brat (1938) - Evelyn Morgan
- Letter of Introduction (1938) - Maud Raleigh - Park Plaza Gossip (uncredited)
- When Tomorrow Comes (1939) - Woman (uncredited)
- Lady of the Tropics (1939) - Mrs. Hazlitt
- The Women (1939) - Woman at Modiste Salon (uncredited)
- I Take This Woman (1940) - May - Saleslady (uncredited)
- Flight Angels (1940) - Miss Mason
- All This, and Heaven Too (1940) - Lady at the Theatre (uncredited)
- I Want a Divorce (1940) - Mrs. Tyrell (uncredited)
- Margie (1940) - Mrs. Dixon
- Melody Comes to Town (1941) - Miss Dunham (final film role)
