= Why Be Good? =

1929 film directed by William A. Seiter

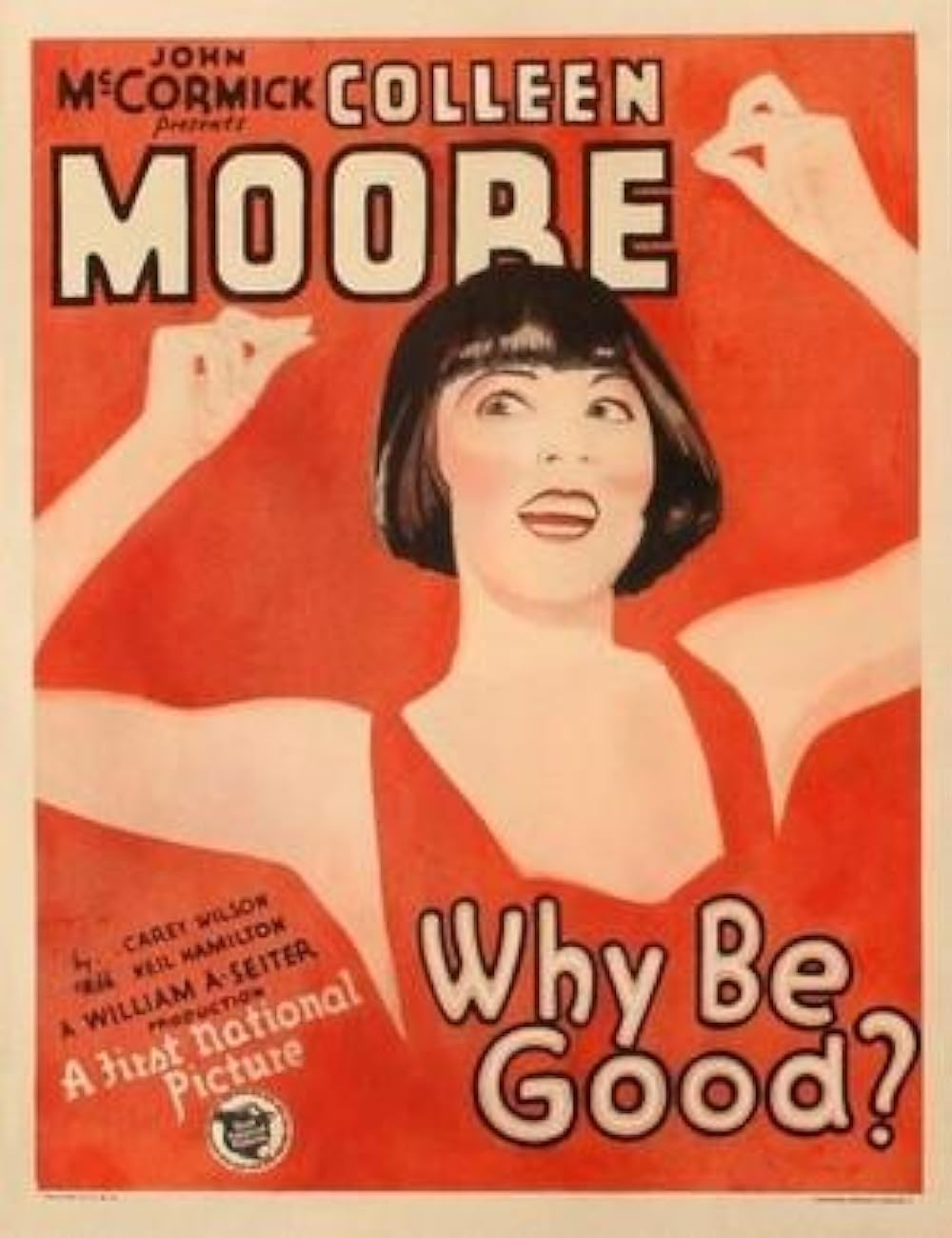
- Theatrical release poster
- Directed by: William A. Seiter
- Written by: Paul Perez
- Screenplay by: Carey Wilson
- Story by: Carey Wilson
- Produced by: John McCormick
- Starring: Colleen Moore
- Cinematography: Sidney Hickox
- Edited by: Terry O. Morse
- Production company: First National Pictures
- Distributed by: Warner Bros. Pictures
- Release date: February 28, 1929
- Running time: 84 minutes
- Country: United States
- Languages: Sound (Synchronized); English intertitles

Full film

Why Be Good? is a 1929 American Synchronized sound comedy film produced by First National Pictures starring Colleen Moore and Neil Hamilton. While the film has no audible dialogue, it is accompanied by a Vitaphone soundtrack that features a musical score with sound effects and some synchronized singing.

== Plot ==
Winthrop Peabody Jr. and his friends prepare to frolic into the night before he must begin work the following day at his father's department store. Before departing, Winthrop Peabody Sr. lectures his son about women and warns him to avoid the store's female employees.

Pert Kelly, after winning a dance contest, is wooed by gentlemen of questionable character. Pert catches the eye of Peabody Jr., who drives her home and schedules a date for the following night. Because she was out late, Pert is tardy to work and must report to the personnel office, where she is surprised to find Peabody Jr. working. Peabody Sr. sees what has happened and fires Pert.

Peabody Jr. explains to Pert that it was not he who had terminated her, and they schedule another date. Lavish gifts arrive for Pert to wear to the next date. Her father admonishes her about the lack of virtues of the modern man, and Peabody Sr. repeats his warning to his son.

On the next date, Peabody Jr. has devised a test of Pert's virtue. When he tries to push her past her personal limits, she protests and passes his test. They are married that night and prove her virtue to Peabody Sr., who cannot now refute it.

== Cast ==
- Colleen Moore as Pert Kelly
- Neil Hamilton as Winthrop Peabody Jr.
- Bodil Rosing as Ma Kelly
- John St. Polis as Pa Kelly
- Edward Martindel as Winthrop Peabody Sr.
- Louis Natheaux as Jimmy Alexander
- Eddie Clayton as Tim
- Lincoln Stedman as Jerry
- Collette Merton as Julie
- Dixie Carter as Susie

== Music ==
The film featured a theme song entitled "I'm Thirsty for Kisses - Hungry for Love" with words and music by Lou Davis and J. Fred Coots.

== Censorship ==
Like many American films of the time, Why Be Good? was subject to cuts by city and state film censorship boards. In Kansas the film, with its plot of a test of the virtue of a young woman, was banned by the Board of Review.

== Preservation ==
Why Be Good? had been considered a lost film for many decades, with only the film's Vitaphone soundtrack still in existence. In the late 1990s, a 35 mm print of the film was discovered in the archives of the Cineteca Italiana. Restoration work was completed in 2014, funded by Warner Bros. Pictures and The Vitaphone Project.

The U.S. premiere of the restoration was hosted by the Academy of Motion Picture Arts and Sciences at the Los Angeles County Museum of Art's Bing Theater on September 6, 2014. This same restoration was released on DVD-R by the Warner Archive Collection on October 28, 2014, and screened at New York's Film Forum on November 9, 2014. It was later aired on the Turner Classic Movies channel.

== See also ==
- List of early sound feature films (1926–1929)
