= The Coward (1927 film) =

1927 film

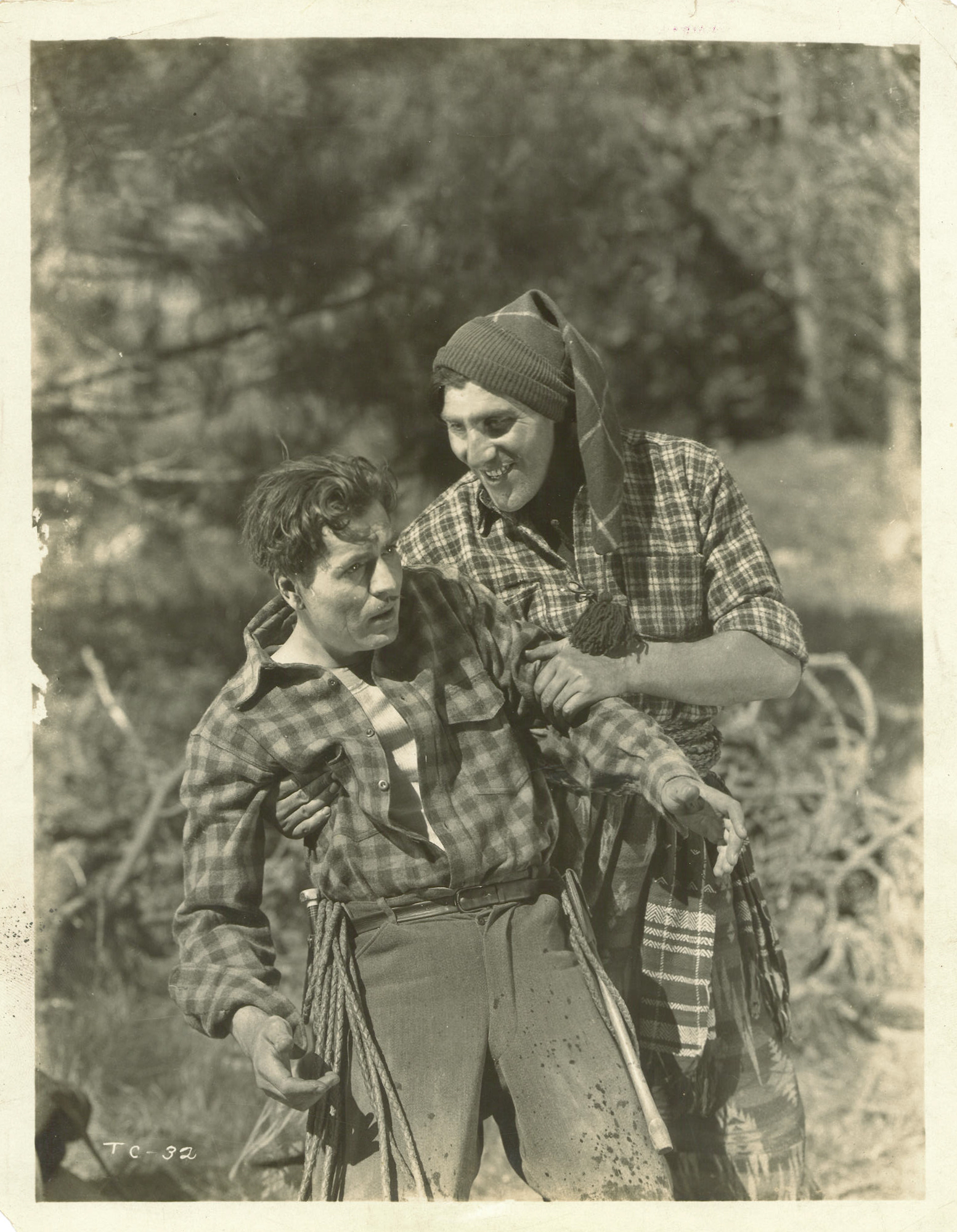
- Still with Warner Baxter and Raoul Paoli
- Directed by: Al Raboch
- Produced by: Joseph P. Kennedy
- Starring: Warner Baxter; Sharon Lynn
- Cinematography: Jules Cronjager
- Distributed by: Film Booking Offices of America
- Release date: August 21, 1927
- Running time: 6 reels; 5,093 feet
- Country: United States
- Language: Silent (English intertitles)

The Coward is a 1927 American silent drama film produced by Robertson-Cole Pictures Corporation (aka Joseph P. Kennedy) and stars Warner Baxter and Sharon Lynn. It was directed by Al Raboch.

== Cast ==
- Warner Baxter as Clinton Philbrook
- Sharon Lynn as Alicia Van Orden
- Freeman Wood as Leigh Morlock
- Raoul Paoli as Pierre Bechard
- Byron Douglas as Darius Philbrook
- Charlotte Stevens as Marie
- Hugh Thomas as Maitland

== Preservation ==
With no prints of The Coward located in any film archives, it is a lost film.
