= My American Wife (1936 film) =

1936 film by Harold Young

- Theatrical release poster
- Directed by: Harold Young
- Screenplay by: Elmer Davis; Edith Fitzgerald; Virginia Van Upp
- Produced by: Albert Lewis
- Starring: Francis Lederer; Ann Sothern; Fred Stone; Billie Burke; Ernest Cossart; Grant Mitchell
- Cinematography: Harry Fischbeck
- Edited by: Paul Weatherwax
- Music by: Gerard Carbonara (uncredited)
- Production company: Paramount Pictures
- Distributed by: Paramount Pictures
- Release date: August 7, 1936
- Running time: 65 minutes
- Country: United States
- Language: English

My American Wife is a 1936 American comedy film directed by Harold Young and written by Elmer Davis, Edith Fitzgerald and Virginia Van Upp. The film stars Francis Lederer, Ann Sothern, Fred Stone, Billie Burke, Ernest Cossart and Grant Mitchell. The film was released on August 7, 1936, by Paramount Pictures.

== Cast ==
- Francis Lederer as Count Ferdinand von und zu Reidenach
- Ann Sothern as Mary Cantillon
- Fred Stone as Lafe Cantillon
- Billie Burke as Mrs. Robert Cantillon
- Ernest Cossart as Adolphe
- Grant Mitchell as Robert Cantillon
- Hal K. Dawson as Stephen Cantillon
- Helene Millard as Mrs. Vincent Cantillon
- Adrian Morris as Vincent Cantillon
- Dora Clement as Agnes, Mrs. Stephen Cantillon
- C. Montague Shaw as Butler
