= By Whose Hand? (1932 film) =

1932 film

- Directed by: Benjamin Stoloff
- Written by: Harry Adler; Isadore Bernstein; Stephen Roe
- Starring: Ben Lyon; Barbara Weeks; Kenneth Thomson
- Cinematography: Ted Tetzlaff; Joseph Walker
- Edited by: Maurice Wright
- Production company: Columbia Pictures
- Distributed by: Columbia Pictures
- Release date: July 6, 1932
- Running time: 65 minutes
- Country: United States
- Language: English

By Whose Hand? is a 1932 American mystery film directed by Benjamin Stoloff and starring Ben Lyon, Barbara Weeks and Kenneth Thomson.

In London the film premiered on a double bill with Michael Powell's quota quickie His Lordship.

A print is preserved in the Library of Congress collection.

== Cast ==
- Ben Lyon as Jimmy
- Barbara Weeks as Alice
- Kenneth Thomson as Chambers
- Ethel Kenyon as Eileen
- William V. Mong as Graham
- Dolores Ray as Bride
- Nat Pendleton as The Killer
- Tom Dugan as Drunk
- Dwight Frye as Chick

== Bibliography ==
- Chibnall, Steve. Quota Quickies: The Birth of the British 'B' Film. British Film Institute, 2007.
