= Two-Fisted Sheriff =

1937 film by Leon Barsha

- Theatrical release poster
- Directed by: Leon Barsha
- Screenplay by: Paul Perez
- Story by: William Colt MacDonald
- Produced by: Harry L. Decker
- Starring: Charles Starrett; Barbara Weeks
- Cinematography: Allen G. Siegler
- Edited by: William Lyon
- Production company: Columbia Pictures
- Release date: June 15, 1937 (US)
- Running time: 59 minutes
- Country: United States
- Language: English

Two-Fisted Sheriff is a 1937 American Western film directed by Leon Barsha, starring Charles Starrett and Barbara Weeks.

== Cast ==
- Charles Starrett as Sheriff Dick Houston
- Barbara Weeks as Molly Herrick
- Bruce Lane as Bob Pearson
- Edward Peil Sr. as Judge Webster
- Allan Sears as Alan SearsBill Slagg
- Walter Downing as Doc Pierce
- Ernie Adams as Sheriff Rankin
- Claire McDowell as Miss Herrick
- Frank Ellis as Gargan
- Robert Walker as Lyons
- George Chesebro as Prosecutor Ed
