= Joseph Valentine =

Italian-American cinematographer

Joseph A. Valentine
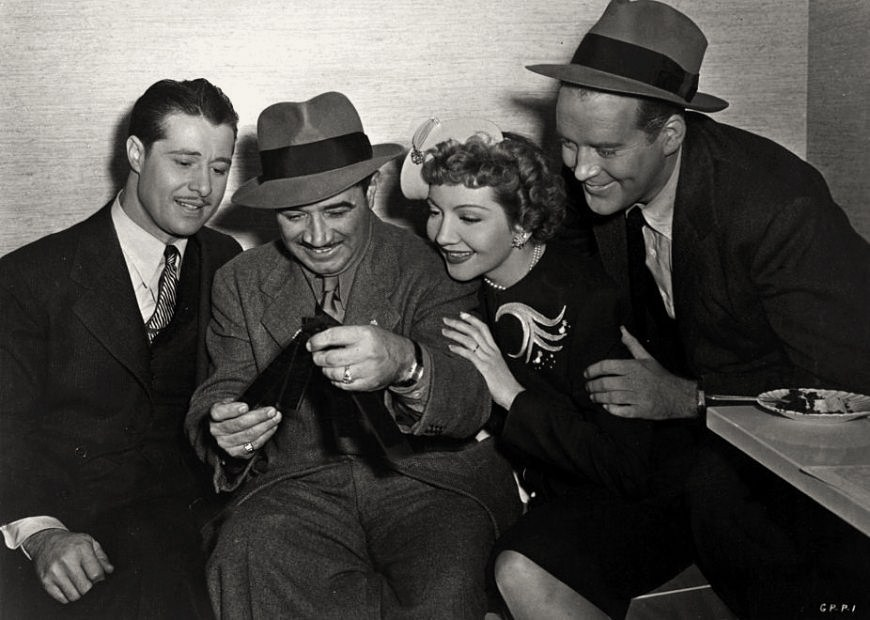
- Left to right: Don Ameche, Joseph Valentine, Claudette Colbert, and Dick Foran on the set of Guest Wife (1945).
- Born: Giuseppe Valentino; July 24, 1900; New York City, New York
- Died: May 18, 1949 (aged 48); Cheviot Hills, California
- Occupation: Cinematographer
- Years active: 1924–1949

Joseph A. Valentine (July 24, 1900 in New York City, as Giuseppe Valentino – May 18, 1949 in (Cheviot Hills, California) was an Italian-American cinematographer, five-time nominee for the Academy Award for Best Cinematography, and co-winner once in 1949.

== Biography ==
Trained in photography, Valentine moved to working in films in the 1920s and from 1924 became a chief cinematographer. Honing his craft by working on several B-films, his final years were spent on the cinematography for three Alfred Hitchcock films.

Valentine was nominated for the Academy Award in 1937 for Wings Over Honolulu, in 1938 for Mad About Music, in 1939 for First Love, in 1940 for Spring Parade. In 1949, on his fifth nomination, he won for Joan of Arc.

== Partial filmography ==
- The Folly of Vanity (1924)
- The Star Dust Trail (1924)
- Curlytop (1924)
- The Scarlet Honeymoon (1925)
- 7th Heaven (1927)
- News Parade (1928)
- Prep and Pep (1928)
- Speakeasy (1929)
- Protection (1929)
- The Girl from Havana (1929)
- Crazy That Way (1930)
- Cheer Up and Smile (1930)
- Soup to Nuts (1930)
- Are You There? (1931)
- Night of Terror (1933)
- Man Hunt (1933)
- What Price Innocence? (1933)
- Jimmy and Sally (1933)
- Myrt and Marge (1933)
- A Woman's Man (1934)
- Three on a Honeymoon (1934)
- Wild Gold (1934)
- Call It Luck (1934)
- Student Tour (1934)
- Alias Mary Dow (1935)
- Swellhead (1935)
- Doubting Thomas (1935)
- The Gay Deception (1935)
- Next Time We Love (1936)
- The Moon's Our Home (1936)
- Two in a Crowd (1936)
- The Man I Marry (1936)
- Three Smart Girls (1936)
- Wings over Honolulu (1937)
- One Hundred Men and a Girl (1937)
- Merry-Go-Round of 1938 (1937)
- Mad About Music (1938)
- The Rage of Paris (1938)
- That Certain Age (1938)
- Three Smart Girls Grow Up (1939)
- First Love (1939)
- My Little Chickadee (1940)
- It's a Date (1940)
- Spring Parade (1940)
- One Night in the Tropics (1940)
- Unfinished Business (1941)
- Appointment for Love (1941)
- Keep 'Em Flying (1941)
- The Wolf Man (1941)
- Saboteur (1942)
- Between Us Girls (1942)
- Shadow of a Doubt (1943)
- Guest Wife (1945)
- Tomorrow Is Forever (1946)
- So Goes My Love (1946)
- Heartbeat (1946)
- Lover Come Back (1946)
- Magnificent Doll (1946)
- Possessed (1947)
- Sleep, My Love (1948)
- Rope (1948)
- Joan of Arc (1948)
- Bride for Sale (1949)
