= Joe Brown (actor) =

American actor (1884–1965)

Joe Brown (February 11, 1884 in New York City - October 13, 1965 in Hollywood, California) was an American actor. He is best remembered for roles in films such as Me, Gangster (1928), Sunny Side Up (1929), Protection (1929), Born Reckless (1930) and Charlie Chan's Chance (1932).
