= Small Town Girl (1936 film) =

1936 film by William A. Wellman, Robert Zigler Leonard

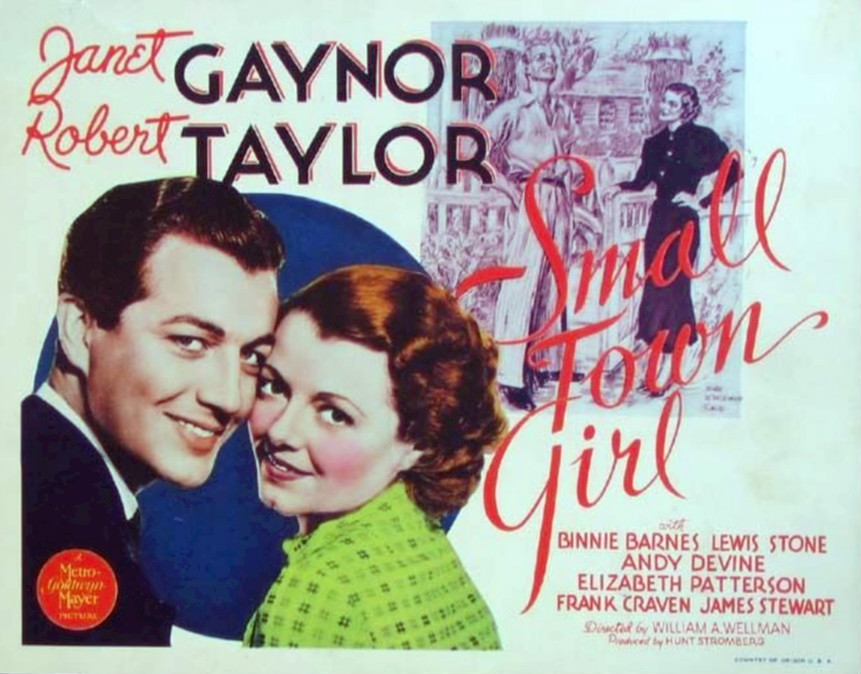
- Theatrical release poster
- Directed by: William A. Wellman; Robert Z. Leonard (uncredited)
- Screenplay by: John Lee Mahin; Frances Goodrich; Albert Hackett; Edith Fitzgerald
- Based on: Small Town Girl; 1935 novel by Ben Ames Williams
- Produced by: Hunt Stromberg
- Starring: Janet Gaynor; Robert Taylor; Binnie Barnes; Lewis Stone; Andy Devine; Elizabeth Patterson; Frank Craven; James Stewart
- Cinematography: Oliver T. Marsh; Charles Rosher
- Edited by: Blanche Sewell
- Music by: Herbert Stothart; Edward Ward
- Distributed by: Metro-Goldwyn-Mayer
- Release date: April 10, 1936
- Running time: 106 minutes
- Country: United States
- Language: English
- Budget: $760,000
- Box office: $1,605,000

Small Town Girl is a 1936 American romantic comedy film directed by William A. Wellman and starring Janet Gaynor, Robert Taylor, and James Stewart. The supporting cast features Binnie Barnes, Andy Devine, Lewis Stone and Edgar Kennedy.

Based on a novel by Ben Ames Williams, the film went through many changes before it reached the screen. The script is credited to John Lee Mahin, Edith Fitzgerald, and the husband-and-wife team of Albert Hackett and Frances Goodrich.

It has no relation to the 1953 MGM musical film of the same title.

== Plot ==
From TCM.com: “Kay Brannan is so bored with her life that she can barely tolerate her family and prospective suitor, Elmer. A traffic diversion brings hundreds of Yale-Harvard football players through town. One of them, Robert Dakin, a socially prominent surgeon from Boston, asks her for directions to a popular roadhouse and takes her there to join in the fun.

Later Bob becomes so drunk that he insists that they have a justice of the peace marry them. Kay is not quite so drunk, but she agrees, eager for any escape from the tedium. The next morning, Bob's parents like Kay, but are shocked that Bob, who was to marry socialite Priscilla Hyde in two weeks, would be so foolhardy. To avoid a scandal, Bob suggests to Kay that they pretend to be happily married for six months and then quietly get a divorce. Although hurt, she agrees, and after a staged "honeymoon" aboard the Dakin family yacht, they return to Boston. Gradually, they begin to fall in love, but they still keep each other at arm's length.

When Priscilla returns from a European holiday, she and Bob begin seeing each other secretly. One night, Kay gets a telephone call from Bob's clinic urgently summoning him to perform emergency brain surgery on Jimmy, a young patient. When Priscilla refuses to let her speak to Bob over the phone, Kay goes to Priscilla's apartment to fetch him. Bob starts the operation, but is not sure that he is sober enough to save Jimmy, so he has his colleague Dr. Underwood complete the delicate surgery.

At home, Bob feels like a failure. Kay hesitatingly starts to tell him about her feelings, but Priscilla calls and she leaves. She tells Bob's parents that she is returning home, and a short time later, the local newspaper mentions that Bob is rumored to be leaving for Reno for a divorce. Kay takes a walk and meets Elmer, who proposes, but just then Bob drives up. After telling Kay that he has lost his way to Reno and never wants to find it, they drive off together.”

== Cast ==
- Janet Gaynor as Katherine Brannan
- Robert Taylor as Dr. Robert Dakin
- Binnie Barnes as Priscilla Hyde
- Andy Devine as George Brannan
- Lewis Stone as Dr. Dakin
- Elizabeth Patterson as Ma Brannan
- Frank Craven as Pa Brannan
- James Stewart as Elmer Clampett
- Isabel Jewell as Emily Brannan
- Charley Grapewin as Dr. Ned Fabre, Robert's boss
- Nella Walker as Mrs. Dakin
- Robert Greig as Childers, the Dakins' butler
- Edgar Kennedy as Captain Mack, in command of the yacht
- Willie Fung as So-So, a family servant

=== Casting ===
TCM’s Margarita Landazuri writes:” MGM had originally announced Small Town Girl as a vehicle for Jean Harlow. Janet Gaynor had been 20th Century Fox's most important star in the late silent and early talkie period. But by 1936, her status at Fox had been eclipsed by... Shirley Temple. So both Gaynor and Fox executives were happy about loaning her to MGM for a first-class production like Small Town Girl, particularly since she would be cast opposite MGM's hottest young leading man.. “

== Production ==
Landazuri continued: “Director William Wellman was a relative latecomer to the project. Wellman was equally at home in comedies as he was in action films, but his comedy style was more rough-and-tumble than Gaynor's, and the two clashed repeatedly during filming. Wellman was so unhappy, in fact, that he asked to be removed from the picture. MGM denied his request.”

“Later that year, Wellman was working for David O. Selznick in a project dear to Wellman's heart, A Star Is Born. Selznick thought Gaynor would be ideal for the lead, and Wellman, despite his earlier problems with Gaynor, agreed wholeheartedly with Selznick's choice. This collaboration would be much happier for the star and director.”

== Box office ==
According to MGM records, the film earned $1,108,000 in the US and Canada and $497,000 elsewhere resulting in a profit of $274,000.

== Accolades ==
The film was nominated for the American Film Institute's 2002 list AFI's 100 Years...100 Passions.
