= Paul Page (actor) =

American actor (1903–1974)

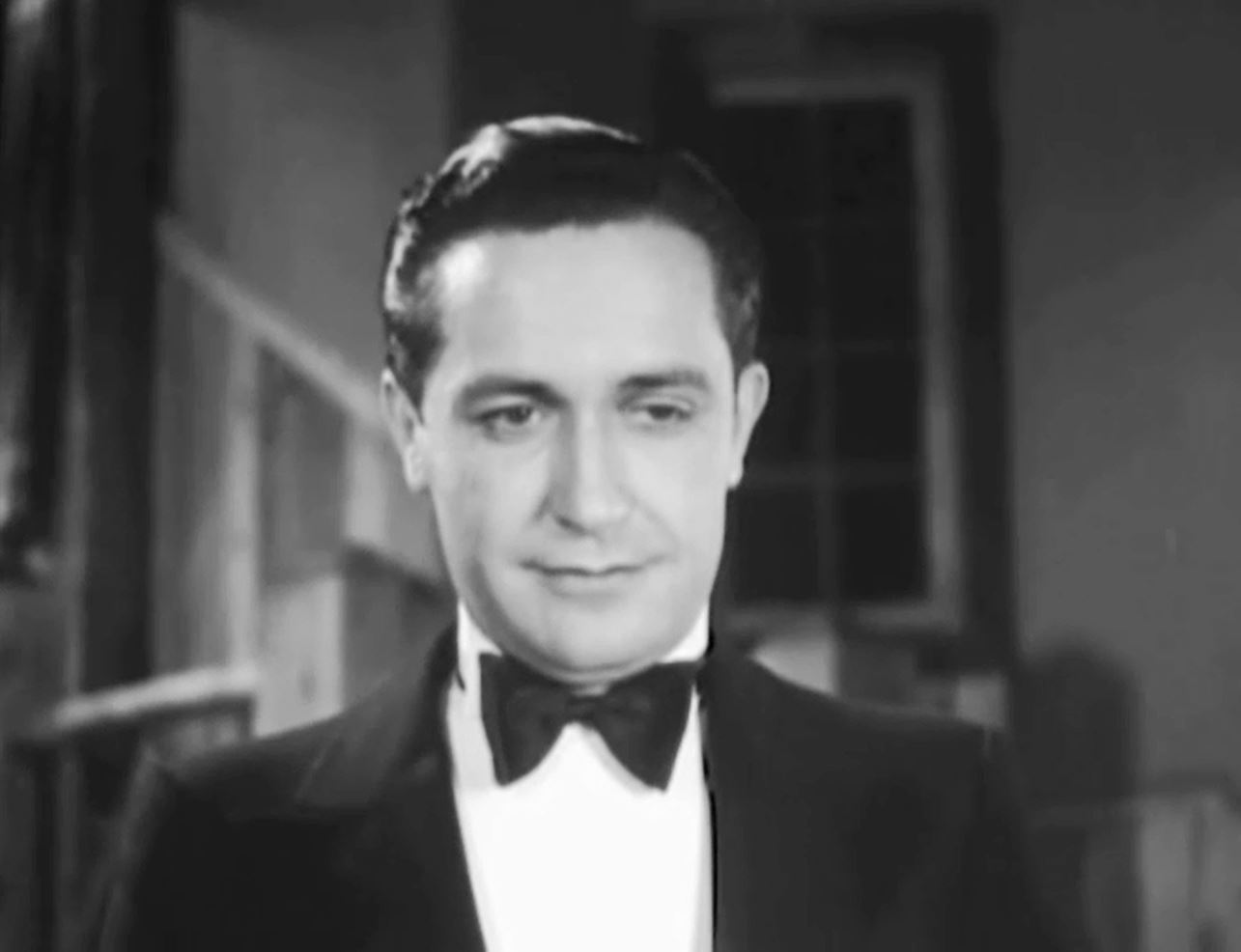
- Page in The Road to Ruin (1934)
- Born: May 13, 1903; Birmingham, Alabama, U.S.
- Died: April 28, 1974 (aged 70); Hermosa Beach, California, U.S.
- Occupation: Actor
- Years active: 1929–1934
- Spouse: Ethel Allis (1929-?)

Paul Page (May 13, 1903 – April 28, 1974) was an American film actor.

Born Campbell U. Hicks, he was the son of Robert C. Hicks and Laura Conant Hicks.

Page attended Baltimore Polytechnic Institute and graduated from St. John's College in Annapolis with a degree in engineering.

On July 10, 1929, he married Ethel Allis.

Page produced eight films with mixed success, after which he became an agent for actors. When a problem with his leg prevented him from serving in World War II, he began working in industrial relations for Douglas Aircraft Company. He left it in 1946 to go into real estate, but he returned to Douglas in 1951. He, his wife, and their daughter lived in Hermosa Beach, California.

== Selected filmography ==
Film
Year	Title	Role	Notes
1929	Speakeasy	Paul Martin	Lost film
1929	Protection	Chick Slater	
1929	Happy Days		Lost film
1929	The Girl from Havana	Allan Grant	
1930	Men Without Women	Handsome	
1930	The Golden Calf	Edwards	
1930	Born Reckless	Ritzy Reilly	
1931	Palmy Days	Steve	
1931	Pleasure	George Whitney	
	The Naughty Flirt		
1932	Bachelor Mother	Arthur Hall	
1933	Below the Sea	Bert Jackson	
1934	The Road to Ruin	Ralph Bennett	
1934	Have a Heart	Joe Lacey	
1934	The Moth	George Duncan	
1934	Kentucky Kernels	Jerry Bronson	
