= Love Bound =

1932 film

- Poster
- Directed by: Robert F. Hill
- Written by: James R. Gilbert; Robert F. Hill; George H. Plympton
- Produced by: Sam Efrus; Albert Herman
- Starring: Jack Mulhall; Natalie Moorhead; Clara Kimball Young
- Cinematography: E. Fox Walker
- Edited by: Earl Neville
- Music by: Lee Zahler
- Production company: Peerless Pictures
- Distributed by: Peerless Pictures
- Release date: March 1, 1932
- Running time: 61 minutes
- Country: United States
- Language: English

Love Bound is a 1932 American Pre-Code mystery film directed by Robert F. Hill and starring Jack Mulhall, Natalie Moorhead, Clara Kimball Young. It is a second feature produced by the Poverty Row studio Peerless Pictures. The film is also known as Murder on the High Seas, the alternative title it was later reissued under.

== Plot ==
Gold-digging actress Verna Wilson demands money from a financial theatrical backer by falsely threatening to tell his wife that their relationship is more than professional. After he pays up his son Dick discovers that Verna is part of a gang of blackmailers and is now fleeing the country on an ocean liner. He boards the ship along with his chauffeur and the two pose as wealthy playboys so that Verna will attempt to play the same trick on them. Dick and Verna instead fall in love, but things are complicated by the presence of her associates on board the ship, leading to a murder.

== Cast ==
- Jack Mulhall as Richard "Dick" Randolph, posing as Dick Rowland
- Natalie Moorhead as Verna Wilson, alias Vera Wendall
- Clara Kimball Young as Mrs. Jane Randolph
- Edmund Breese as J.B. "Lucky" Morrison
- Tom Ricketts as The Baron
- Alice Day as Claudia Elliott
- William V. Mong as Verna's Crooked Lawyer
- Montagu Love as John Randolph
- Richard Alexander as Larry, the Randolph Chauffeur, posing as J. B. "Lucky" Morrison
- Roy D'Arcy as Juan de Leon
- Lynton Brent as Jimmy Wilson
- Sidney Bracey as Spriggins
- Gordon De Main as Flynn - Private Detective
- Robert F. Hill as Ship Passenger
- Olaf Hytten as Ship Passenger
- William H. O'Brien as Butler

== Bibliography ==
- Pitts, Michael R. Poverty Row Studios, 1929–1940: An Illustrated History of 55 Independent Film Companies, with a Filmography for Each. McFarland & Company, 2005.
