= Illicit (1931 film) =

1931 film

- Lantern slide
- Directed by: Archie Mayo
- Screenplay by: Harvey F. Thew
- Based on: an unproduced play by Edith Fitzgerald; Robert Riskin
- Produced by: Darryl F. Zanuck
- Starring: Barbara Stanwyck; James Rennie; Ricardo Cortez; Natalie Moorhead
- Cinematography: Robert Kurrle
- Edited by: William Holmes
- Music by: Erno Rapee; Louis Silvers
- Distributed by: Warner Bros. Pictures, Inc.
- Release date: February 14, 1931 (USA)
- Running time: 79 minutes
- Country: United States
- Language: English

Illicit is a 1931 American pre-Code drama film directed by Archie Mayo and starring Barbara Stanwyck, James Rennie, Ricardo Cortez, and Natalie Moorhead. Based on a play by Edith Fitzgerald and Robert Riskin, the film is about a young couple living together out of wedlock because the woman does not believe in marriage. When they finally get married, both become unfaithful to each other. Illicit was produced and distributed by Warner Bros. Pictures.

== Plot ==
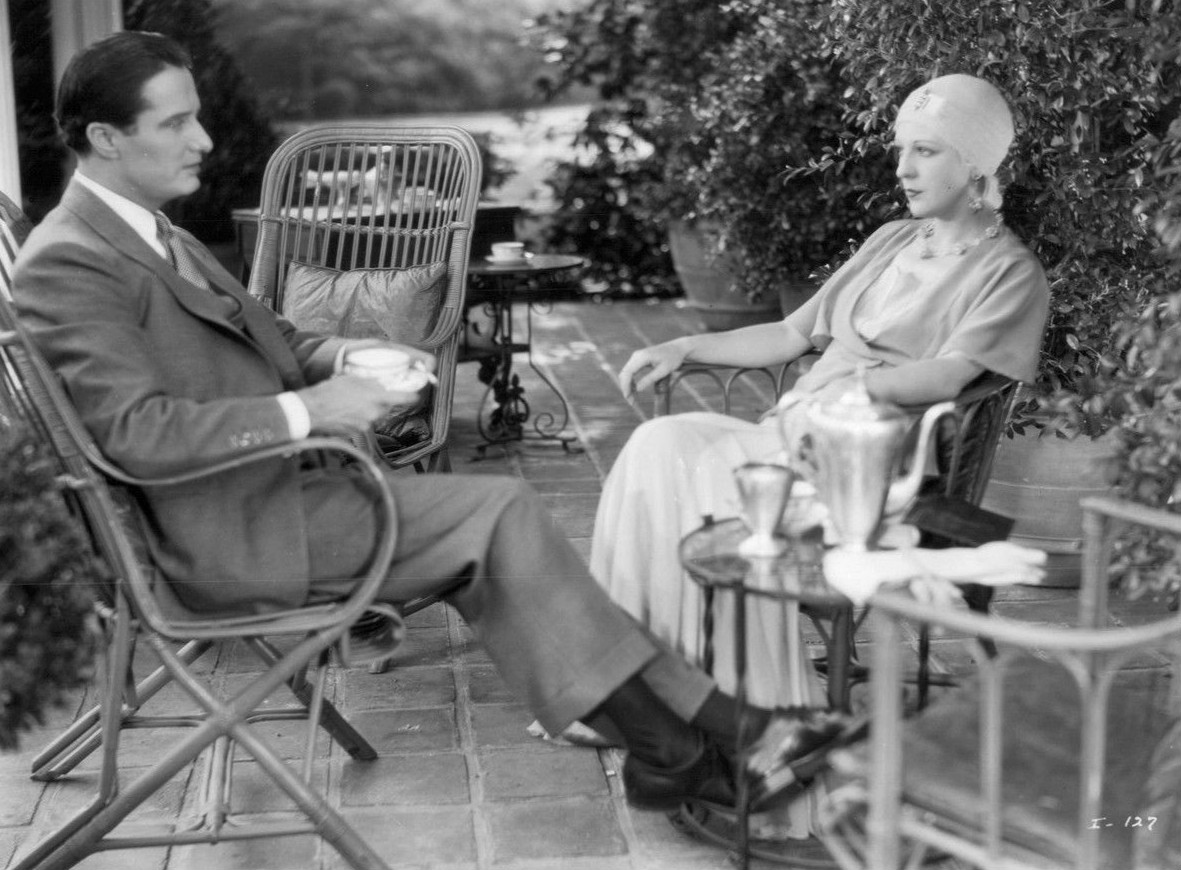
James Rennie and Natalie Moorhead in a scene from the film.

Anne Vincent is a woman who has modern ideas about love. She believes that marriage kills love and leads to unhappiness and, inevitably, divorce. Although her boyfriend, Dick Ives II, and his father, Dick Sr., try to persuade Anne to get married, she resists their arguments. She believes it is important for people to be individuals, and that when they marry, they tend to become too emotionally dependent on each other, rather than, as an old suitor says, "being responsible to no one but herself." Both Anne and Dick have prior romantic entanglements still in the picture. Margie True admits she still loves Dick, and they talk; he says she will find someone who loves her as much as he loves Anne.

Anne and Dick see each other until late at night, and go away for weekends together for a while without getting married. However, after word gets out about a weekend away, Dick pressures Anne, and eventually she caves in to avoid scandal. When the news becomes public, Anne receives a telegram from her ex-boyfriend, Price Baines, saying that he wants to visit her. Dick doesn't want Anne to see him, but she does so anyway. Price tries to persuade Anne not to get married, tells her that he is still in love with her, and warns her that she will be unhappy if she marries, but she has already made up her mind.

Anne marries Dick, and they start to behave like a typical married couple, meeting social expectations regarding attending events and visiting people. They seem to be unable to share the romantic time alone together that they did in the past. They tire of each other, avoid each other and fight over silly things. Eventually Anne tells Dick that they need to separate for a time. At first this rekindles the romance. But when Price Baines comes back into the picture, Dick becomes resentful, and starts to take an interest in Margie True, who tells him that she is still in love with him. Price Baines woos Anne aggressively. Ultimately, however, the separation makes Dick and Anne realize that there are no substitutes for each other, in spite of the costs involved.

== Cast ==
- Barbara Stanwyck as Anne Vincent
- James Rennie as 'Dick' Ives II
- Ricardo Cortez as Price Baines
- Natalie Moorhead as Margie True
- Charles Butterworth as Georgie Evans
- Joan Blondell as Helen 'Duckie' Childers
- Claude Gillingwater as Ives Sr.
- Lucille Ward as Susan - Anne's Maid (uncredited)
- Barbara Weeks as Girl at the Bridal Shower (uncredited)

== Production ==
=== Soundtrack ===
- "When Love Comes in the Moonlight" Played during the credits (from the Warner Bros. musical Oh Sailor Behave).
- "Maybe It's Love" Sung by James Rennie and Barbara Stanwyck (from the Warner Bros. musical Maybe It's Love).
- "Looking for the Lovelight in the Dark" Played on the radio (from the Warner Bros. musical Top Speed).
- "Pretty Little You" Played on the radio (from the Warner Bros. film Son of the Gods).
- "In the Land of Let's Pretend" Used in scoring (from the Warner Bros. musical On with the Show).
- "Get Happy" Played in nightclub

== Reception ==
Writing on January 25, 1931, for The New York Times, Mordaunt Hall declared the film "QUITE an intelligent and entertaining feature…,” but found the story implausible at times. “(T)he dialogue runs along smoothly and the acting is highly competent. It is not overwhelmingly subtle and the cheery or satisfactory ending is a trifle too sudden. Its argument is that, whether a young couple are living in companionate marriage or conventional marriage, they are only held together by love. Although superficially this is the case in this narrative, it seems as though the characters might have an excuse for parting forever had they not been bound by marriage ties… (It) opens with Richard Ives and Anne Vincent living together…Apparently nobody suspects that they are exponents of companionate marriage, and not until they put up at hotels together does society begin to observe this breach of social law. This causes one to think that most of the friends of the two lovers go about blindfolded. Then there are offered on the screen excerpts from a society paper which is evidently not concerned with the libel laws. From then on the chronicle becomes diverting in spite of its lack of suspense. Anne and Richard are married …They are happy for a year, and then the inevitable bickering occurs. Then comes the conventional excuse..the discovery that he is after all interested in that attractive blonde…Anne has her old flame, who virtually tells her that he hopes her marriage will be a failure when he says that if she ever separates or is divorced from Richard he will be waiting for her. Barbara Stanwyck and James Rennie are thoroughly human in their rôles. The lighter vein is expressed by Charles Butterworth in his admirable, peculiar fashion. Claude Gillingwater is capital as Richard's father, who is responsible for making Anne consent to marriage.”

On August 19, 2008, Dennis Schwartz observed: “This daring risqué melodrama...has aged badly and when viewed today seems arch. If it weren't for the fine performance by the twenty-four-year old Barbara Stanwyck in her first starring role, this would be a real snoozer. Archie Mayo...does a poor job keeping this morality tale alive, as it's way too chatty, the characters remain undeveloped clichés and it has no surprises up its sleeve to keep us tuned in....In this trivial and tedious weepie that lacks much punch and action, after both parties in the separation seek solace in others they have a reawakening after much soul searching and reunite for a happy ending. Thereby they reinforce the traditions of marriage over living a sexually free life and the film takes the sauce out of any arguments it offered to the contrary. Two years later the studio made an exact remake called Ex-Lady, which starred Bette Davis. At least this dud had Stanwyck.

== Preservation ==
The film survives intact and has been shown on television and cable. A copy is held in the Library of Congress collection. It is also available on Region 1 DVD from Warner Archive as part of a double feature with Girl Missing.
