= Forbidden Trail =

1932 film

- Directed by: Lambert Hillyer
- Written by: Milton Krims
- Produced by: Irving Briskin
- Starring: Buck Jones; Barbara Weeks; George Cooper
- Cinematography: L. William O'Connell
- Edited by: Gene Milford
- Music by: Mischa Bakaleinikoff
- Production company: Columbia Pictures
- Distributed by: Columbia Pictures
- Release date: November 18, 1932
- Running time: 68 minutes
- Country: United States
- Language: English

Forbidden Trail is a 1932 American pre-Code western film directed by Lambert Hillyer and starring Buck Jones, Barbara Weeks and George Cooper.

== Cast ==
- Buck Jones as Tom Devlin
- Barbara Weeks as Mary Middleton
- George Cooper as Happy - Tom's Sidekick
- Wallis Clark as Cash Karger
- Mary Carr as Mrs. Middleton
- Albert J. Smith as Burke - Henchman
- Ed Brady as J. Snodgrass
- Frank Rice as Sheriff Hibbs
- Charles Berner as Johnson - Rancher
- Charles Brinley as Townsman / Nester
- Buck Bucko as Townsman / Nester
- Roy Bucko as Townsman / Nester
- Wong Chung as Wong - Chinese Cook
- Ken Cooper as Townsman / Nester
- Rube Dalroy as Mob Member
- Frank Ellis as Ranch Hand
- Jack Evans as Townsman / Nester
- Tom B. Forman as Collins' Ranch Foreman
- Herman Hack as Nester
- Allen Holbrook as Townsman / Nester
- Frank LaRue as Collins - Rancher
- Bert Lindley as Mob Member
- Lew Meehan as Townsman
- Art Mix as Ranch Hand
- Buck Moulton as Collins Ranch Hand
- Jack Rockwell as Townsman
- Dick Rush as Wright - Rancher
- Blackjack Ward as Townsman

== Bibliography ==
- Fetrow, Alan G. . Sound films, 1927-1939: a United States Filmography. McFarland, 1992.
- Pitts, Michael R. Western Movies: A Guide to 5,105 Feature Films. McFarland, 2012.
