= Fifteen Wives =

1934 film by Frank R. Strayer

- Directed by: Frank R. Strayer
- Written by: Charles Belden; Frederick Stephani
- Produced by: Maury M. Cohen
- Starring: Conway Tearle; Natalie Moorhead; Raymond Hatton
- Cinematography: M.A. Anderson
- Edited by: Roland D. Reed
- Production company: Invincible Pictures
- Distributed by: Chesterfield Pictures
- Release date: July 15, 1934
- Running time: 65 minutes
- Country: United States
- Language: English

Fifteen Wives is a 1934 American mystery film directed by Frank R. Strayer and starring Conway Tearle, Natalie Moorhead and Raymond Hatton.

== Plot ==
After arriving from South America, a man is murdered at a New York hotel. When the police investigate, they discover he has fifteen wives.

== Cast ==
- Conway Tearle as Insp. Decker Dawes
- Natalie Moorhead as Carol Manning
- Raymond Hatton as Det. Sgt. Meade
- Noel Francis as Ruby Cotton
- John Wray as Jason Getty
- Margaret Dumont as Sybilla Crum
- Ralf Harolde as The Electric Voice
- Oscar Apfel as Dist. Atty. Kerry
- Robert Frazer as Chemist
- Henry C. Bradley as Davis - Hotel Manager
- Lew Kelly as Connelly - Hotel Detective
- Clarence Brown as Head Porter
- Albert Pollet as Thompson
- Almeda Fowler as Nurse
- Dickie Moore as Young Boy

== Bibliography ==
- Michael R. Pitts. Poverty Row Studios, 1929–1940: An Illustrated History of 55 Independent Film Companies, with a Filmography for Each. McFarland & Company, 2005.
