= The Golden Calf (1930 film) =

1930 film

- Directed by: Millard Webb
- Screenplay by: Marion Orth; Harold R. Atteridge
- Based on: The Golden Calf by Aaron Davis
- Starring: Jack Mulhall; Sue Carol; El Brendel; Marjorie White; Richard Keene; Paul Page
- Cinematography: Lucien Andriot
- Edited by: Alex Troffey
- Music by: (all uncredited); Hugo Friedhofer; Arthur Kay; Jean Talbot
- Production company: Fox Film Corporation
- Distributed by: Fox Film Corporation
- Release date: March 16, 1930
- Running time: 69 minutes
- Country: United States
- Language: English

The Golden Calf is a 1930 American pre-Code musical comedy film directed by Millard Webb and written by Marion Orth and Harold R. Atteridge. The film stars Jack Mulhall, Sue Carol, El Brendel, Marjorie White, Richard Keene and Paul Page. The film was released on March 16, 1930, by Fox Film Corporation.

== Cast ==
- Jack Mulhall as Philip Homer
- Sue Carol as Marybelle Cobb
- El Brendel as Knute Olson
- Marjorie White as Alice
- Richard Keene as Tommy
- Paul Page as Edwards
- Walter Catlett as Master of Ceremonies
- Ilka Chase as Comedienne
