= Now I'll Tell =

1934 film by Edwin J. Burke

- Directed by: Edwin J. Burke
- Written by: Edwin J. Burke
- Story by: Carolyn Green Rothstein
- Produced by: Winfield R. Sheehan
- Starring: Spencer Tracy; Helen Twelvetrees; Alice Faye
- Cinematography: Ernest Palmer
- Edited by: Harold D. Schuster
- Production company: Fox Film Corporation
- Distributed by: Fox Film Corporation
- Release date: June 8, 1934
- Running time: 72 minutes
- Country: United States
- Language: English

Now I'll Tell is a 1934 American pre-Code drama film directed by Edwin J. Burke starring Spencer Tracy, Helen Twelvetrees, and Alice Faye. It was produced by Fox Film shortly before the company's merger with Twentieth Century Pictures. It marked the final screen appearance of former silent star Alice Calhoun.

== Plot ==
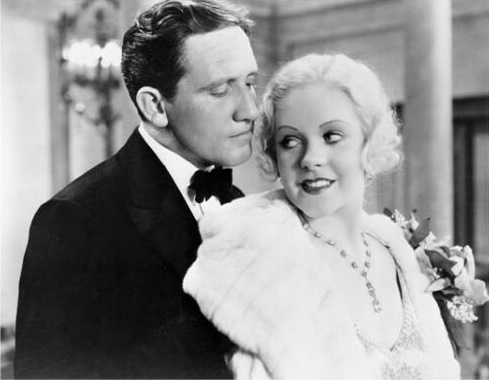
Spencer Tracy and Alice Faye in Now I'll Tell

Murray Golden is an unscrupulous New York City gambler and casino operator who wants to live life to the fullest. His philosophy is encapsulated in something he keeps saying: "You're only wrong when you fail." His wife, Virginia, has extracted a promise that he will quit the business once he makes $500,000. However, when he does, he breaks his word. He also starts seeing Peggy Warren behind his wife's back.

Murray learns that gangster Al Mossiter has fixed a championship boxing match. He pays one of the fighters to take a dive in the second round, before Mossiter's man goes down in the fifth, and wins a lot of money. (Mossiter's boxer is later murdered.) However, Virginia hears about Peggy and threatens to leave Murray. He manages to convince her that Peggy is the mistress of Freddie, Murray's friend and associate. He also tells her that he has made enough money and is getting into the insurance business.

Later, Mossiter learns who double-crossed him and vows to get back everything Murray won from the fight. An associate suggests he kidnap Virginia. When Murray is told about the kidnapping, he races back to the city, but is injured and Peggy is killed in a car crash. Virginia is freed unharmed when the ransom is paid, but she has had enough. She decides to get a divorce.

Years later, Murray receives a telegram from Virginia, telling him she is sailing home from Europe and has a "surprise". He is overjoyed, assuming she is coming back to him. However, she tells him that she is going to marry someone else. She asks him for her jewelry. He promises to give it to her in a week, though he is down on his luck and has pawned them.

He gets into a poker game with Mossiter and others. After playing for a day and a half, he owes $210,000. Mossiter buys up all of his IOUs and gives him a deadline to come up with the money. Murray shows up at Mossiter's hotel room and declares he is not going to pay. Furthermore, he says he is going to tell the district attorney who killed the boxer. After Mossiter shoots him, Murray reveals he took out a life insurance policy on himself in order to raise the money to get Virginia's jewelry back. He boasts that he has outsmarted his killer (winning a $20 bet they had made). The doctor informs Virginia that Murray is dying, so she lies and tells him she is returning to him.

== Cast ==
- Spencer Tracy as Murray Golden
- Helen Twelvetrees as Virginia Golden
- Alice Faye as Peggy Warren
- Robert Gleckler as Al Mossiter
- Henry O'Neill as Tommy Doran
- Hobart Cavanaugh as Freddie
- G. P. Huntley as Hart
- Shirley Temple as Mary Doran
- Ronnie Cosby as Tommy Doran Jr.
- Ray Cooke as Eddie Traylor
- Frank Marlowe as George Curtis
- Clarence Wilson as Attorney Joe Davis
- Barbara Weeks as Wynne
- Theodore Newton as Joe
- Vince Barnett as Peppo
- James Donlan as Honey Smith
- Leon Ames as Max
- Alice Calhoun as Mrs. Doran
- Donald Haines as Messenger Boy (uncredited)
- Nelson McDowell as Bettor (uncredited)
- Jack Mower as Gangster (uncredited)

== Production ==
The film was directed and written by Edwin J. Burke and is loosely based on the autobiography of Carolyn Green Rothstein, wife of New York gambler Arnold Rothstein. Co-star Alice Faye was 18 years old. Five-year-old future child star Shirley Temple (in a smaller role) also appeared in the film.
