= Frederick Hazlitt Brennan =

American screenwriter

- Born: September 23, 1901; Saint Louis, Missouri
- Died: June 30, 1962 (aged 60); Ventura County, California
- Occupation: Screenwriter
- Years active: 1929-1961

Frederick Hazlitt Brennan (September 23, 1901 – June 30, 1962) was an American screenwriter of more than thirty films between 1929 and 1953 and the director of the ABC/Desilu western television series, The Life and Legend of Wyatt Earp (1955–1961), starring Hugh O'Brian as deputy Marshal Wyatt Earp.

Born in St. Louis, Missouri, he was educated at the University of Missouri in Columbia and began his career as a newspaper reporter. He wrote many short stories and was published in The Saturday Evening Post, Collier's Weekly, and other magazines. He published several novels and wrote for the theatre including the play The Wookey, which ran on Broadway.

He died in Ventura County, California, from a self-inflicted gunshot wound. He had three children.

== Partial filmography ==
- The Ghost Talks (1929)
- Speakeasy (1929)
- Strong Boy (1929)
- Words and Music (1929)
- God's Gift to Women (1931)
- Sporting Blood (1931)
- Play Girl (1932)
- The Big Broadcast of 1938 (1938)
- A Guy Named Joe (1943)
- Branded (1950)
- Follow the Sun (1951)
- A Girl in Every Port (1952)
