= Sharon Lynn =

American actress and singer (1901–1963)

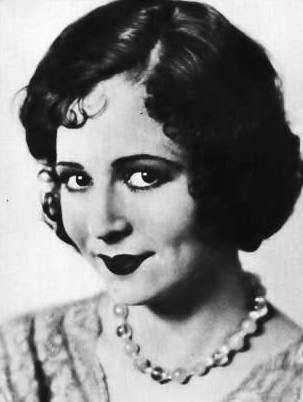
- Lynn in 1930
- Born: D'Auvergne Sharon Lindsay; April 9, 1901; Weatherford, Texas, U.S.
- Died: May 26, 1963 (aged 62); Hollywood, California, U.S.
- Education: Fullerton Union High School
- Occupations: Actress, singer
- Years active: 1924–1938
- Spouse(s): Benjamin Glazer (1932–1956) (his death); John Sershen (1961–1963) (her death)

Sharon Lynn (born D'Auvergne Sharon Lindsay, April 9, 1901 – May 26, 1963) was an American actress and singer. She began playing in silent films but enjoyed her biggest success in the early sound years of motion pictures before fading away in the mid-1930s. She is perhaps best known for portraying Lola Marcel, the villainess in the Laurel and Hardy comedy feature, Way Out West.

== Early years ==
Lynn was born in Weatherford, Texas. She moved to Fullerton, California, at a young age and was educated in Fullerton's public schools. Later she was a student at the Paramount Motion Picture School.

== Career ==
Lynn made her debut in Curlytop in 1924 as Annie, and after appearing in several silent films, she debuted in talking pictures in Speakeasy (1929). After her best known film role opposite Laurel and Hardy in Way Out West, she made only one more film, a musical made in Britain, Thistledown, and then retired from the screen.

== Personal life ==
On January 16, 1932, in Yuma, Arizona, Lynn married film executive Benjamin Glazer who died in 1956. She was also wed to John Sershen.

== Death ==
On May 26, 1963, Lynn died at Hollywood Presbyterian Hospital, at age 62 of multiple sclerosis.

== Partial filmography ==
- Curlytop (1924)
- The Coward (1927)
- Clancy's Kosher Wedding (1927)
- Tom's Gang (1927)
- The Cherokee Kid (1927)
- Aflame in the Sky (1927)
- Jake the Plumber (1927)
- None but the Brave (1928)
- Son of the Golden West (1928)
- Give and Take (1928)
- Red Wine (1928)
- Speakeasy (1929)
- Fox Movietone Follies of 1929 (1929)
- The One Woman Idea (1929)
- Happy Days (1929)
- Sunny Side Up (1929)
- Let's Go Places (1930)
- Up the River (1930)
- Crazy That Way (1930)
- Lightnin' (1930)
- Men on Call (1931)
- Too Many Cooks (1931)
- The Big Broadcast (1932)
- Discarded Lovers (1932)
- Enter Madame (1935)
- Go into Your Dance (1935)
- Way Out West (1937)
- Thistledown (1938)
