= Edwin J. Burke =

American screenwriter

- Born: August 30, 1889; Albany, New York, USA
- Died: September 26, 1944 (aged 55); New York City, New York, USA
- Other name: Edwin Burke
- Occupations: screenwriter and playwright
- Years active: 1928-1936

Edwin J. Burke (August 30, 1889 – September 26, 1944) was an American screenwriter who was most known for writing some of Shirley Temple's earlier films.

He won an Academy Award at the 5th Academy Awards in the category of Best Adapted Screenplay for the film Bad Girl.

He was also a successful playwright. He wrote the play that inspired the film This Thing Called Love.

== Filmography ==
Only films that he wrote the screenplay for, not ones that were adapted from his plays-unless he helped write the screenplay to it.

- Plastered in Paris (1928)
- The Girl from Havana (1929)
- Good Medicine (1929)
- Happy Days (1929)
- Love, Live and Laugh (1929)
- Not Quite Decent (1929)
- Speakeasy (1929)
- Woman Trap (1929)
- The Dancers (1930)
- Harmony at Home (1930)
- Man Trouble (1930)
- Auto Intoxication (1931)
- Bad Girl (1931)
- It Might Be Worse (1931)
- The Man Who Came Back (1931)
- Mr. Lemon of Orange (1931)
- Sob Sister (1931)
- The Stolen Jools (1931)
- Young as You Feel (1931)
- Call Her Savage (1932)
- Dance Team (1932)
- Down to Earth (1932)
- Hello, Sister! (1933)
- Paddy the Next Best Thing (1933)
- Bright Eyes (1934)
- Now I'll Tell (1934)
- Broadway Melody of 1936 (1935)
- The Farmer Takes a Wife (1935)
- The Littlest Rebel (1935)
- One More Spring (1935)
- Song and Dance Man (1936)
