= Ex-Lady =

1933 film by Robert Florey

- Theatrical release poster
- Directed by: Robert Florey
- Written by: David Boehm
- Produced by: Darryl F. Zanuck
- Starring: Bette Davis; Gene Raymond; Frank McHugh; Monroe Owsley
- Cinematography: Tony Gaudio
- Edited by: Harold McLernon
- Music by: Leo F. Forbstein
- Production companies: Vitaphone; Warner Bros. Pictures
- Distributed by: Warner Bros. Pictures
- Release date: May 15, 1933
- Running time: 67 minutes
- Country: United States
- Language: English
- Budget: $93,000
- Box office: $283,000

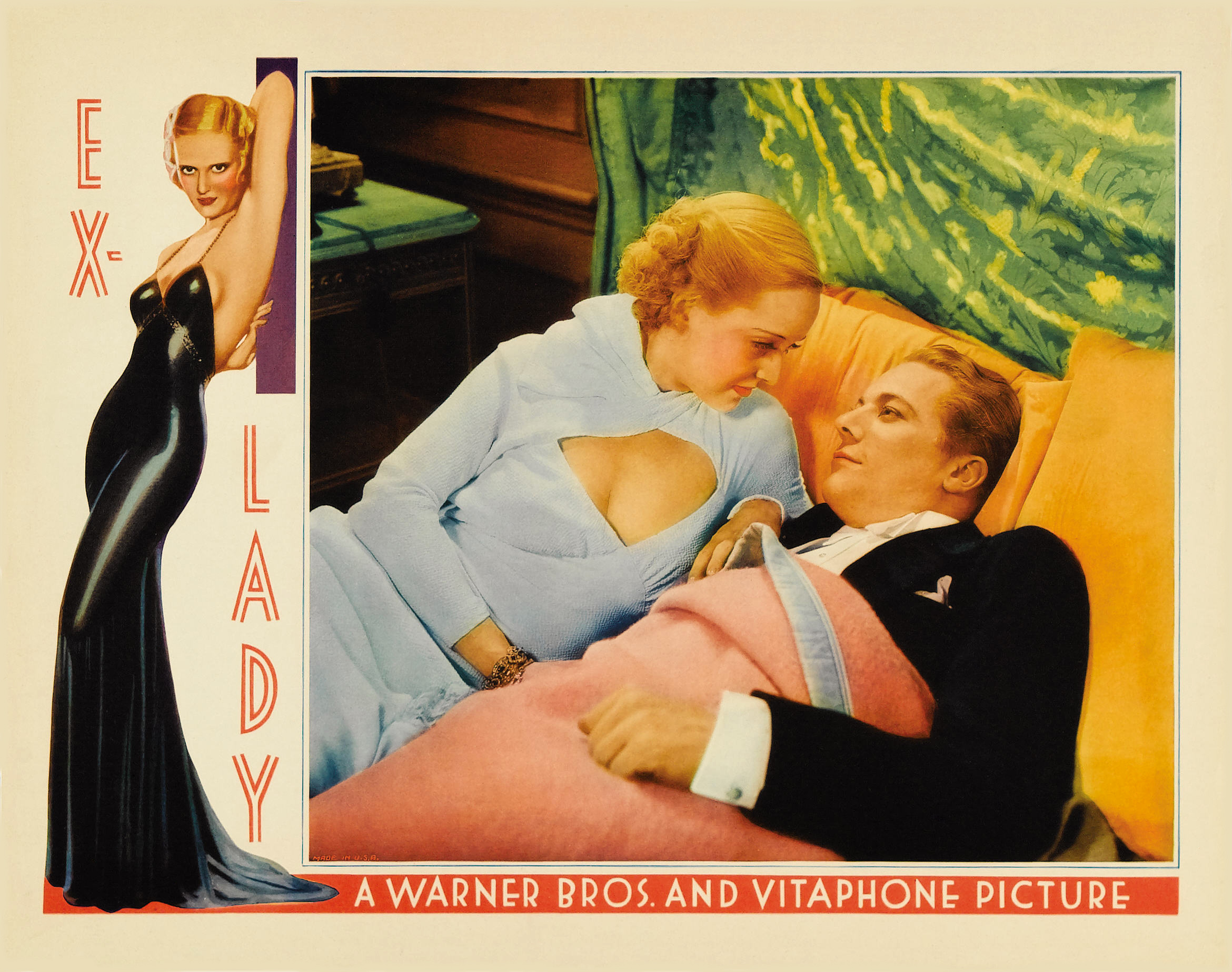
Lobby card

Ex-Lady is a 1933 American pre-Code comedy/drama film directed by Robert Florey. The screenplay by David Boehm is a remake of the Barbara Stanwyck film Illicit (1931), both crediting a story (actually a play) by Edith Fitzgerald and Robert Riskin. The film focuses on a pair of lovers, commercial illustrator Helen Bauer (Bette Davis) and advertising writer Don Peterson (Gene Raymond), who have been living together quite happily (in separate apartments) for some time. One night, after hiding in Helen's bedroom until their party guests have all left, Don announces that he is tired of sneaking around. He wants marriage—and possibly children—and Helen finally agrees, although she is afraid that it will wreck their relationship. Her predictions of trouble—increased by the stresses of opening their own advertising agency—come true, but in the end, with the serendipitous intervention of their perpetually inebriated friend, Van (Frank McHugh), they reconcile and resume the mixed blessings of wedded bliss.

== Plot ==
Helen Bauer is a glamorous, successful, headstrong, and very liberated New York graphic artist with modern ideas about romance. She is involved with Don Peterson but is not prepared to sacrifice her independence by entering into matrimony. The two agree to wed only to pacify Helen's conventional immigrant father Adolphe, whose Old World views spur him to condemn their affair. They form a business partnership, but financial problems at their advertising agency put a strain on the marriage and Don begins seeing Peggy Smith, one of his married clients. Convinced it was marriage that disrupted their relationship, Helen suggests they live apart but remain lovers. When Don discovers Helen is dating his business rival, playboy Nick Malvyn, he returns to Peggy, but in reality his heart belongs to his wife. Agreeing their love will help their marriage survive its problems, the two reconcile and settle into domestic bliss.

The plot is unusual for its time in that Helen is not denigrated for her beliefs about marriage and Don is not depicted as being a cad. In addition, although they are sleeping together and unmarried, neither is concerned about the possibility of children, and certain dialog could suggest that they are using birth control.

== Cast ==
- Bette Davis as Helen Bauer
- Gene Raymond as Don Peterson
- Kay Strozzi as Peggy Smith
- Monroe Owsley as Nick Malvyn
- Ferdinand Gottschalk as Herbert Smith
- Alphonse Ethier as Adolphe Bauer
- Frank McHugh as Hugo Van Hugh
- Claire Dodd as Iris Van Hugh
- Bodil Rosing as Mrs. Bauer
- George Beranger as Dinner Guest / Pianist (uncredited)
- Armand Kaliz as Man Flirting With Iris (uncredited)
- William H. O'Brien as Butler (uncredited)
- Gay Seabrook as Miss Seymour - Don's Secretary (uncredited)
- Billy West as Panhandler (uncredited)
- Renee Whitney as Party Guest (uncredited)
- Ynez as Cuban Nightclub Dancer (uncredited)

== Production ==
The Warner Bros. film was a remake of the Barbara Stanwyck vehicle Illicit, released two years earlier.

Following the film's release, producer Darryl F. Zanuck resigned from Warners to form his own production company, Twentieth Century Pictures, which eventually merged with Fox to become 20th Century Fox.

The prologue to the 1962 film What Ever Happened to Baby Jane? includes a scene from Ex-Lady as an example of former child star Jane Hudson's failure to achieve screen success as an adult due to her lack of talent.

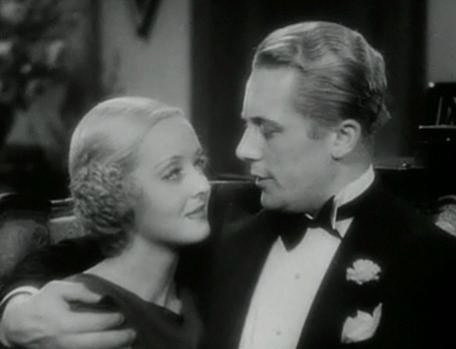
Davis and Raymond in a scene from the trailer for Ex-Lady.

== Critical reception ==
The New York Times in a contemporary review from 1933, described the film as "an honestly written and truthfully enacted picture of the domestic problems which harass two persons in love with one another".

In contrast, a more recent review in TV Guide called it a "lame little melodrama notable chiefly for being the first film to have Bette Davis' name above the title".

== Legacy ==
In her 1962 autobiography, Davis expressed her disdain for the film calling it a “piece of junk”. She also stated that the film “was supposed to be provocative and provoked anyone of sensibility to nausea”.

For the film, Davis had been given the Hollywood glamor girl treatment, which she resented for she “wasn’t the type to be glamorized”. She was even more outraged over the marketing campaign for the film which “falsely pictured her as half-naked” on the film's posters, declaring that her shame was only exceeded by her fury. She hated this film and this part of her career so much that she admitted her “conscious tastefully avoided” all memories of this film.

Despite Davis's dislike of the film, she admittedly had more disgust for Parachute Jumper (1933)

In 2013, the Warner Archive Collection included this film in its DVD box set of Forbidden Hollywood Collection: Volume 7; with The Hatchet Man (1932), Skyscraper Souls (1932), and Employees' Entrance (1933).

== Box office ==
According to Warner Bros the film earned $228,000 domestically and $55,000 foreign.
