= Women Men Marry (1931 film) =

1931 film

- Directed by: Charles Hutchison
- Written by: Jack Natteford
- Produced by: Charles Hutchison
- Starring: Natalie Moorhead; Sally Blane; Randolph Scott
- Cinematography: Leon Shamroy
- Edited by: Bernard B. Ray
- Production company: Charles Hutchison Productions
- Distributed by: Headline Pictures
- Release date: March 2, 1931
- Running time: 76 minutes
- Country: United States
- Language: English

Women Men Marry is a 1931 American pre-Code drama film directed by Charles Hutchison and starring Natalie Moorhead, Sally Blane and Randolph Scott. It was distributed by the independent Headline Pictures.

== Plot ==
Rose and Steve Bradley, a happy young couple arrive in New York City from the South. Under the influence of their friends the Moulton they are quickly corrupted by the low morals of the metropolis.

== Cast ==
- Natalie Moorhead as Dolly Moulton
- Sally Blane as Rose Bradley
- Randolph Scott as Steve Bradley
- Kenneth Harlan as Fred Moulton
- Crauford Kent as John Graham
- Jean Del Val as Pierre Renault
- Jimmy Aubrey as Jimmy

== Critical reception ==
A review in Variety noted "with a fair cast eclipsed by an incredibly stupid story and dialogue, Women Men Marry is the type of production 15 cent audiences first laugh at then become peeved. It's like a puppet show. The dead come to life and everyone's reformed".

== Bibliography ==
- Langman, Larry. A Guide to American Film Directors: The Sound Era, 1929-1979, Volume 1. Scarecrow Press, 1981.
- Nott, Robert. The Films of Randolph Scott. McFarland, 2015.
