= Alias the Deacon =

Alias the Deacon may refer to:

- Alias the Deacon (1927 film), an American silent drama film
- Alias the Deacon (1940 film), an American comedy film
