= Alias the Deacon (1927 film) =

1927 film

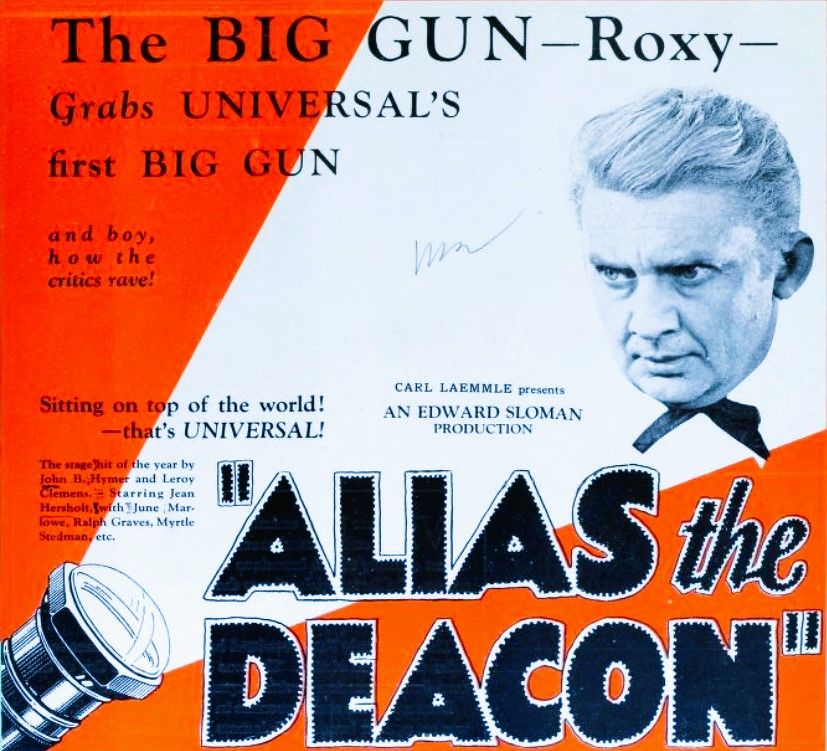
- Advertisement
- Directed by: Edward Sloman
- Written by: Charles Kenyon; Walter Anthony
- Based on: Alias the Deacon by John B. Hymer and Leroy Clemens
- Produced by: Carl Laemmle
- Starring: Jean Hersholt; June Marlowe; Ralph Graves
- Cinematography: Jackson Rose; Gilbert Warrenton
- Edited by: Byron Robinson
- Production company: Universal Pictures
- Distributed by: Universal Pictures
- Release date: June 20, 1927 (New York City)
- Running time: 7 reels (2,093.67 meters)
- Country: United States
- Language: Silent (English intertitles)

Alias the Deacon is a 1927 American silent drama film directed by Edward Sloman and starring Jean Hersholt, June Marlowe, and Ralph Graves. It was produced and released by Universal Pictures. Based on a stage play of the same name, it was directed by Edward Sloman and is preserved at the Library of Congress Packard Campus for Audio-Visual Conservation. It was remade as the sound film Alias the Deacon in 1940.

== Cast ==
- Jean Hersholt as George Caswell or The Deacon
- June Marlowe as Phyllis/Mrs. Nancy Blythe
- Ralph Graves as Jim Adams
- Myrtle Stedman as Mrs. Betsy Clark
- Lincoln Plumer as John Cunningham
- Ned Sparks as Slim Sullivan
- Tom Kennedy as Bull Moran
- Maurice Murphy as Willie Clark
- George West as George
- Wilson Benge as Minister
- Walter Brennan as Cashier at Cunningham's Rink
- Joseph W. Girard as Sheriff of Morton County
- Annabelle Magnus as Nancy as a Child
- George Periolat as Giuseppi Padroni aka Tony the Dip

== Remake ==
This film was remade in 1940 starring Bob Burns, Mischa Auer, and Peggy Moran.
