= Ruth Warren =

American actress (1901–1986)

- Born: March 27, 1901; Louisiana, U.S.
- Died: July 9, 1986 (aged 85); Asheville, North Carolina, U.S.
- Occupation: Actress
- Years active: 1930–1961

Ruth Warren (March 27, 1901 – July 9, 1986) was an American film and television actress.

== Career ==
Warren started her career as a contractor at Fox Studios. She started her acting career in the film Lightnin', followed by Men on Call, Doctors' Wives, Devil's Lottery, The Last Trail, Merry Wives of Reno, The Farmer Takes a Wife, Her Master's Voice, Partners in Crime, Prison Farm, When Tomorrow Comes, Sailor's Lady, and House of Wax during the 1930s, 1940s and 1950s.

She also appeared on television in Ford Theatre, Annie Oakley, Celebrity Playhouse, The Millionaire, Lux Video Theatre, Chevron Hall of Stars, and Thriller during the 1950s and 1960s.

== Filmography ==
=== Film ===
- Lightnin' (1930) - Mrs. Margaret Davis
- Men on Call (1931) - Mrs. Burke
- Doctors' Wives (1931) - Nurse Charlotte
- Mr. Lemon of Orange (1931) - Mrs. Hilda Blake
- Women of All Nations (1931) - Ruth (uncredited)
- Annabelle's Affairs (1931) - Lottie
- The Guilty Generation (1931) - Nellie Weaver
- Devil's Lottery (1932) - Maid (uncredited)
- Hello Trouble (1932) - Emmy
- Face in the Sky (1933) - Fairgrounds Spectator (uncredited)
- State Fair (1933) - Mrs. Edwin Metcalfe (uncredited)
- Zoo in Budapest (1933) - Katrina
- Mama Loves Papa (1933) - Sara Walker
- The Last Trail (1933) - Sally Scott Olsen
- Bombshell (1933) - Miss Carroll from Photoplay Magazine (uncredited)
- The Perils of Pauline (1933) - Stewardess (uncredited)
- The House on 56th Street (1933) - Jail Inmate (uncredited)
- Let's Fall in Love (1933) - Nellie
- The Big Shakedown (1934) - Sheffner's Secretary (uncredited)
- Merry Wives of Reno (1934) - Second Beautician (uncredited)
- Now I'll Tell (1934) - Minor Role (uncredited)
- Doubting Thomas (1935) - Jenny
- The Farmer Takes a Wife (1935) - Mrs. Lansing (uncredited)
- The Gay Deception (1935) - Linen Maid (uncredited)
- Freshman Love (1936) - Marie - Housemother (uncredited)
- Her Master's Voice (1936) - Phoebe
- Small Town Girl (1936) - Mrs. Agnes Haines (uncredited)
- Forgotten Faces (1936) - Nurse
- Spendthrift (1936) - Eleanor - Uncle Morton Middleton's Secretary (uncredited)
- Pepper (1936) - Tenement Woman (uncredited)
- Our Relations (1936) - Mrs. Addlequist (uncredited)
- A Doctor's Diary (1937) - Poor Mother (uncredited)
- Make Way for Tomorrow (1937) - Secretary (uncredited)
- Forlorn River (1937) - Millie Moran - the Cook
- Topper (1937) - Hen-Pecked Motorist's Wife (uncredited)
- Partners in Crime (1937) - Miss Brown (uncredited)
- Breakfast for Two (1937) - Jane (uncredited)
- 45 Fathers (1937) - Sarah
- Big Town Girl (1937) - Customer (uncredited)
- Wells Fargo (1937) - Mrs. Andrews (uncredited)
- Island in the Sky (1938) - Nurse (uncredited)
- Prison Farm (1938) - Prisoner Josie (uncredited)
- Passport Husband (1938) - Apartment House Manager (uncredited)
- Five of a Kind (1938) - Mrs. Leona Hudson (uncredited)
- The Girl Downstairs (1938) - Euphasia, the Cook (uncredited)
- Inside Story (1939) - Townswoman (uncredited)
- Money to Loan (1939) - Loan Victim's Wife (uncredited)
- Union Pacific (1939) - Mrs. Cassidy (uncredited)
- When Tomorrow Comes (1939) - Waitress (uncredited)
- The Cisco Kid and the Lady (1939) - Effie Saunders
- Remember the Night (1940) - Undetermined role (uncredited)
- The Shop Around the Corner (1940) - Customer (uncredited)
- City of Chance (1940) - Wife - in Montage (uncredited)
- I Take This Woman (1940) - Bridget O'Sullivan (scenes deleted)
- The House Across the Bay (1940) - Prisoner's Wife (uncredited)
- Women Without Names (1940) - Roomer (uncredited)
- Free, Blonde and 21 (1940) - Nurse (uncredited)
- Beyond Tomorrow (1940) - Arlene's Maid (uncredited)
- Alias the Deacon (1940) - Lady with Baby (uncredited)
- Sailor's Lady (1940) - Mother (uncredited)
- Manhattan Heartbeat (1940) - Nurse
- Young People (1940) - uncredited
- For Beauty's Sake (1941) - Nurse (uncredited)
- The Man Who Wouldn't Die (1942) - Peggy - the Cook (uncredited)
- Lady in a Jam (1942) - Drunk (uncredited)
- Thru Different Eyes (1942) - Julia
- Jackass Mail (1942) - Doctor's Wife (uncredited)
- Dixie Dugan (1943) - Sergeant's Wife
- Good Morning, Judge (1943) - Katie Bevins (uncredited)
- My Kingdom for a Cook (1943) - Cook (uncredited)
- The Song of Bernadette (1943) - Townswoman (uncredited)
- Pin Up Girl (1944) - Scrubwoman (uncredited)
- Once Upon a Time (1944) - Fatso's Mother (uncredited)
- She's a Soldier Too (1944) - Maggie (uncredited)
- Strange Affair (1944) - Irate Woman at Police Lineup (uncredited)
- She's a Sweetheart (1944) - Edith
- Lake Placid Serenade (1944) - Cleaning Woman (uncredited)
- Tomorrow, the World! (1944) - Undetermined role (unconfirmed, uncredited)
- Roughly Speaking (film) (1945) - Tub Customer (uncredited)
- Keep Your Powder Dry (1945) - WAC (uncredited)
- Three's a Crowd (1945)
- Twice Blessed (1945) - Maid (uncredited)
- Adventures of Rusty (1945) - Mrs. Florence Nelson (uncredited)
- Week-End at the Waldorf (1945) - Telephone operator (uncredited)
- A Close Call for Boston Blackie (1946) - Milkwoman (uncredited)
- Cinderella Jones (1946) - Faded Lady (uncredited)
- Talk About a Lady (1946) - Gossip (uncredited)
- King of the Wild Horses (1947) - Jane Acker
- Sitting Pretty (1948) - Matron (uncredited)
- Canon City (1948) - Mug's Wife
- The Snake Pit (1948) - Patient (uncredited)
- The Lone Wolf and His Lady (1949) - Police Matron (uncredited)
- Mary Ryan, Detective (1949) - Prison Matron (uncredited)
- Bodyhold (1949) - Kitty Cassidy
- Side Street (1950) - Lucky's Housekeeper (uncredited)
- Military Academy with That Tenth Avenue Gang (1950) - Mac's Mother (uncredited)
- In a Lonely Place (1950) - Effie (uncredited)
- Return of the Frontiersman (1950) - Gossiping Woman (uncredited)
- No Way Out (1950) - Sam's Wife (uncredited)
- Between Midnight and Dawn (1950) - Policewoman (uncredited)
- He's a Cockeyed Wonder (1950) - Jenny Morrison - Landlady (uncredited)
- Emergency Wedding (1950) - Shopper (uncredited)
- My True Story (1951) - Mrs. White (uncredited)
- Her First Romance (1951) - Mrs. Marsh (uncredited)
- Never Trust a Gambler (1951) - Mrs. Ginger Gillis (uncredited)
- Corky of Gasoline Alley (1951) - Mrs. Noble (uncredited)
- Sound Off (1952) - Billy's Mother (uncredited)
- Montana Territory (1952) - Mrs. Nelson (uncredited)
- O. Henry's Full House (1952) - Neighbor (segment "The Last Leaf") (uncredited)
- Monkey Business (1952) - Laundress (uncredited)
- Man in the Dark (1953) - Mayme (uncredited)
- House of Wax (1953) - Scrubwoman (uncredited)
- Powder River (1953) - Townswoman (uncredited)
- The Kid from Left Field (1953) - Welfare Worker (uncredited)
- The Long, Long Trailer (1954) - Mrs. Dudley (uncredited)
- A Star Is Born (1954) - Shrine Auditorium Reporter (uncredited)
- Prince of Players (1955) - Nurse in `Romeo and Juliet´ (uncredited)
- Wyoming Renegades (1955) - Mrs. Oliver (uncredited)
- Bring Your Smile Along (1955) - Mrs. Klein, Landlady
- My Sister Eileen (1955) - Matron (uncredited)
- Fury at Gunsight Pass (1955) - Townswoman (uncredited)
- The Phantom Stagecoach (1957) - Townswoman (uncredited)
- The Wayward Bus (1957) - Bit Role (uncredited)
- Escape from San Quentin (1957) - Perturbed Racetrack Patron (uncredited)
- Screaming Mimi (1958) - Mrs. Myers (uncredited)
- The Last Hurrah (1958) - Ellen Davin (uncredited)
- Auntie Mame (1958) - Mrs. Jennings (uncredited)

=== Television ===
- The Ford Television Theatre - Girl in the Park (1952) TV Episode - Wonderful Day for a Wedding (1954) TV Episode
- Annie Oakley - Sure Shot Annie (1955) TV Episode .... Mrs. Bickel
- Celebrity Playhouse - My Name Is Sally Roberts (1956) TV Episode
- The Millionaire - The Cindy Bowen Story (1956) TV Episode .... Nurse Olsen
- Lux Video Theatre - To Each His Own (1954) TV Episode .... Mrs. Ingram - An Act of Murder (1955) TV Episode .... Mrs. Russell - Perilous Deception (1955) TV Episode .... Mrs. Beacham - A Yankee Cousin (1956) TV Episode .... Mrs. Sherman
- Chevron Hall of Stars - Mr. Thompson (1956) TV Episode - Double Cross (1956) TV Episode
- December Bride - Mother-in-Law Club (1957) TV Episode .... Mrs. Hopkinson
- Maverick (TV series) - The Lonesome Reunion (1958) TV Episode .... Local Gossip
- The Gray Ghost - The Master Spy (1958) TV Episode .... Dorothy
- Lawman - The Ring (1959) TV Episode .... Angie Spender
- Thriller - Late Date (1961) TV Episode .... Mrs. Rooney
