= Flying Cadets =

1941 film directed by Erle C. Kenton

- Theatrical release poster
- Directed by: Erle C. Kenton
- Screenplay by: George Waggner; Roy Chanslor; Stanley Rubin
- Produced by: Paul Malvern
- Starring: William Gargan; Edmund Lowe; Peggy Moran; Frank Albertson; Frankie Thomas; Riley Hill
- Cinematography: John W. Boyle
- Edited by: Otto Ludwig
- Production company: Universal Pictures
- Distributed by: Universal Pictures
- Release date: October 24, 1941
- Running time: 60 minutes
- Country: United States
- Language: English

Flying Cadets is a 1941 American adventure film directed by Erle C. Kenton and written by George Waggner, Roy Chanslor and Stanley Rubin. The film stars William Gargan, Edmund Lowe, Peggy Moran, Frank Albertson, Frankie Thomas and Riley Hill. Flying Cadets was released on October 24, 1941, by Universal Pictures.

== Plot ==
At the Monarch Airport, Bob Ames (Frank Albertson) is excited his new flight school to train future military pilots, is ready to open. His partner, "Trip Hammer" (William Gargan), tells him that financing has come from Bob's girl friend, Kitty Randall (Peggy Moran)and her father. Kitty is currently taking flying lessons from Trip.

Trip gets a phone call from Bob's brother, Captain Rodcliffe "Rocky" Ames (Edmund Lowe), a World War I hero now a soldier of fortune, who agrees to help with the flying school, in exchange for Trip taking care of his gambling debts in New York. Trip convinces Bob that the school needs Rocky's name to attract customers, as well as a government training contract.

Trip is right, the school begins attracting students from across the country, but Rocky has immediately annoyed Bob when he flirts with Kitty. Rocky takes Kitty up for a flying lesson, but he is forced to make a sensational landing when Kitty breaks off a wheel during a simulated forced landing.

With the cadets begin flying training, Bob provides the classroom instruction, Trip the mechanics, and Rocky the flight training. The top student is Newton Adams (Frankie Thomas), Rocky's long-lost son. Trip found out the secret and agrees to keep it to himself. Problems soon arise with Newton having a hard time learning to fly from Rocky, who also is jilted when Kitty declares he is "old enough to be her father."

With "Pinkie" Taylor (John Maxwell), a government inspector on the premises, a future aircraft design contract is in jeopardy with Rocky considering quitting to fight in China. Trip accuses him of running away from every responsibility he has ever had and the next morning, a drunken Rocky returns to the flight school.

Later, Rocky flies Bob's new experimental design but fears the aircraft is unsafe. If equipped with a parachute to stop spins, it could be made safe to fly. Newton, trying to prove himself to his father, takes the experimental aircraft up. Trip breaks the news to Rocky that the boy is his son. Realizing that inexperienced pilots will die in a spin, Rocky flies to his son, tells him by radio, how to activate the spin 'chute, but Rocky is distracted and crashes.

Bob later redesigns his aircraft to be safe and receives a contract from the United States Army Air Corps. Newton graduates, and, with other cadets, goes to enlist at air bases. Rocky recovers from his injuries and is finally reunited with his wife Mary (Louise Lorimer).

== Cast ==
- William Gargan as "Trip" Hammer
- Edmund Lowe as Captain Rockcliffe Ames
- Peggy Moran as Kitty Randall
- Frank Albertson as Bob Ames
- Frankie Thomas as Newton R. Adams
- Riley Hill as Barnes
- Charles Williams as Mr. Prim
- John Maxwell as "Pinkie" Taylor
- George Melford as Train Conductor
- Arch Hendricks as Army Colonel
- Louise Lorimer as Mary Adams Ames

== Production ==
Flying Cadets was produced in the years before World War II, when the United States government encouraged Hollywood studios to produce films that would encourage youth to join the resurgent armed forces, especially the U.S. Army Air Corps. Flying Cadets joined 20,000 Men a Year (1939), I Wanted Wings (1941), Give Us Wings (1940) and others of that genre, as a patriotic "flag-waver". (Note: Flying Cadets along with Keep 'Em Flying were both produced by Universal Pictures in 1941.)

Principal photography on Flying Cadets took place from May 12, to late May 1941. The aircraft featured in the film included:

- Stearman C3B
- Ryan STA
- Fairchild 24C-8C
- Brown B-3
- Harlow PJC-5
- Taylorcraft B

== Reception ==
The contemporary film review of Flying Cadets by Bosley Crowther in The New York Times, noted, "For this low-budget Universal picture, which is like a hundred others off the line, is no more than a routine program-filler, no stronger than its weakest cliché, about a free-and-easy old-time flier who teaches at an aviation school and discovers — at the fearful climax, naturally — that his most neglected pupil is his own son."

Aviation film historian James M. Farmer in Celluloid Wings: The Impact of Movies on Aviation (1984), had a similar reaction, saying that Flying Cadets (was) "a low-budget formula piece."
