= Louise Lorimer =

American actress

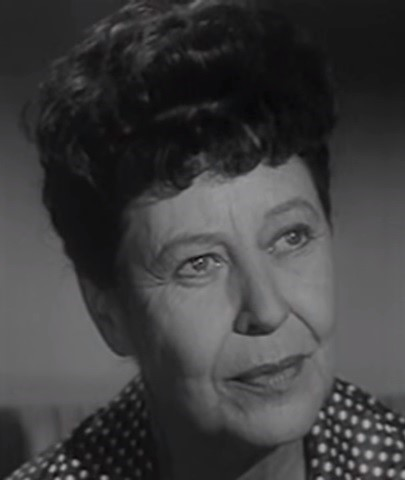
- Lorimer in the TV series One Step Beyond
- Born: July 14, 1898; Newton, Massachusetts, U.S.
- Died: August 12, 1995 (aged 97); Newton, Massachusetts, U.S.
- Occupation: Actress
- Years active: 1934-1982

Louise Lorimer (born Louise Knapp Pinkham, July 14, 1898 – August 12, 1995) was an American actress who played character roles on Broadway, in films, and on television in a career lasting over six decades.

== Life and career ==
Born Louise Knapp Pinkham in Newton, Massachusetts, she attended Newton High School and studied drama at the Leland Powers School in Boston before taking the stage name Louise Lorimer.

Lorimer's acting debut occurred in a Greenwich Village production of East Lynne (1926).

After launching her career in Broadway productions in the 1920s, she played a series of small cinematic roles, including in To Mary – with Love (1936), Gangster's Boy (1938), Manhattan Heartbeat (1940), and Flying Cadets (1941).

During World War II, she performed with the USO in the Pacific. She returned to Broadway in the 1940s, including a role in I Remember Mama (1944), which featured Marlon Brando in his stage debut.

Lorimer's film career continued with Gentleman's Agreement (1947), Once More, My Darling (1949), Father Was a Fullback (1949), The Glass Menagerie (1950), The Sun Sets at Dawn (1950), The Prowler (1951), The People Against O'Hara (1951), Japanese War Bride (1952), Young Man with Ideas (1952), Mister Cory (1957), Compulsion (1959), and -30- (1959).

On television, she played Stagecoach Sal in the western Hopalong Cassidy. She appeared in The Lone Ranger episode (1/16) "Cannonball McKay" as the named character (1949). She appeared in several other series, including Dragnet (1955–58), Dennis the Menace (1959–61), Window on Main Street (1961–62), and Perry Mason (1958-62). Lorimer was close friends with actress Shirley Booth and made multiple appearances on the TV series Hazel as George Baxter’s mother.

In addition to appearing in the TV series Alfred Hitchcock Presents, she had a small role in Alfred Hitchcock's 1964 film Marnie. She continued appearing on television into her 80s, including the pilot of the 1978 series Battlestar Galactica ("Saga of a Star World").

== Death ==
Lorimer died on August 12, 1995, at the age of 97 at her home in Newton, Massachusetts.

== Selected filmography ==
- I've Got Your Number (1934) - Young Telephone Operator (uncredited)
- Nobody's Fool (1936) - Society Woman (uncredited)
- To Mary – with Love (1936) - Nurse
- A Doctor's Diary (1937) - Ludlow's Secretary (uncredited)
- Gangster's Boy (1938) - Mrs. Kelly
- Ex-Champ (1939) - Secretary (uncredited)
- The Forgotten Woman (1939) - Minor Role (uncredited)
- Forgotten Girls (1940) - Inmate (uncredited)
- Star Dust (1940) - Miss Collins (uncredited)
- Grand Ole Opry (1940) - Governor's Secretary (uncredited)
- Manhattan Heartbeat (1940) - Nurse
- Public Deb No. 1 (1940) - Secretary (uncredited)
- Flying Cadets (1941) - Mary Adams / Ames
- Gentleman's Agreement (1947) - Miss Miller (uncredited)
- Sorry, Wrong Number (1948) - Nurse (uncredited)
- The Luck of the Irish (1948) - Augur's Secretary (uncredited)
- The Snake Pit (1948) - Nurse (uncredited)
- Sorrowful Jones (1949) - Nurse-Receptionist (uncredited)
- Any Number Can Play (1949) - Parent (uncredited)
- Once More, My Darling (1949) - Mrs. Fraser
- The Gal Who Took the West (1949) - Mrs. Livia Logan (uncredited)
- Father Was a Fullback (1949) - Mrs. Jones
- The Heiress (1949) - Dr. Sloper's Secretary (uncredited)
- Mother Didn't Tell Me (1950) - Nurse (uncredited)
- The Big Hangover (1950) - Mrs. Johnson (uncredited)
- Mystery Street (1950) - Mrs. Shanway (uncredited)
- Where the Sidewalk Ends (1950) - Mrs. Jackson (uncredited)
- The Glass Menagerie (1950) - Miss Porter (uncredited)
- Mister 880 (1950) - Art Store Proprietress (uncredited)
- The Sun Sets at Dawn (1950) - The Warden's Wife
- Follow the Sun (1951) - Mrs. Willie Clinton (uncredited)
- The Prowler (1951) - Motel Manager
- The People Against O'Hara (1951) - Mrs. Peg O'Hara
- Reunion in Reno (1951) - Mrs. Hunt (uncredited)
- Callaway Went Thataway (1951) - Irate Woman in New York (uncredited)
- Japanese War Bride (1952) - Harriet Sterling
- Young Man with Ideas (1952) - Martha Rickson (uncredited)
- Night Without Sleep (1952) - Mrs. Carter (uncredited)
- Something for the Birds (1952) - Mrs. Winthrop (uncredited)
- Million Dollar Mermaid (1952) - Nurse (uncredited)
- Never Wave at a WAC (1953) - Col. Fullbright (uncredited)
- Pack Train (1953) - Martha Coleman (uncredited)
- Crazylegs (1953) - Mrs. Hirsch
- Wonder Valley (1953) - Sweetheart's Mother
- Strange Lady in Town (1955) - Mrs. Wallace (uncredited)
- There's Always Tomorrow (1955) - Chic Lady with Dog (uncredited)
- You're Never Too Young (1955) - Teacher (uncredited)
- The Benny Goodman Story (1956) - Mrs. Vanderbilt (uncredited)
- Mister Cory (1957) - Mrs. Vollard
- Compulsion (1959) - Mrs. Straus aka 'Mumsy'
- The Young Philadelphians (1959) - Mary Judson (uncredited)
- -30- (1959) - Lady Wilson
- A Fever in the Blood (1961) - Mrs. Emma Jenson, Witness in Car (uncredited)
- Ada (1961) - Mrs. Danford (uncredited)
- Marnie (1964) - Mrs. Strutt (uncredited)
- A Fine Madness (1966) - Clubwoman at Luncheon (uncredited)
- 5 Card Stud (1968) - Mrs. Frank Wells (uncredited)
- The Impossible Years (1968) - Mrs. Celia Fish
- Adam-12 (1972) - Mrs. Colvin
- ’’Adam-12’’ (1974) - Gert
- Family Plot (1976) - Ida Cookson (uncredited)
- The Choirboys (1977) - Fox
