= Recaptured Love =

1930 film

- Directed by: John G. Adolfi
- Written by: Charles Kenyon based on the play Misdeal by Basil Woon
- Starring: John Halliday; Belle Bennett; Dorothy Burgess; Junior Durkin
- Cinematography: John Stumar
- Edited by: James Gibbon
- Distributed by: Warner Bros. Pictures
- Release date: July 8, 1930
- Running time: 77 minutes
- Country: United States
- Language: English

Recaptured Love is a 1930 early talkie pre-Code musical drama film based on the play Misdeal by Basil Woon about a man who experiences a mid life crisis that results in his divorce. It stars Belle Bennett and John Halliday.

== Plot ==
A 50-year-old married man goes with his wife and son to a nightclub in a fancy hotel in Detroit. He meets a gold-digger there, singing the theme song of the picture, and eventually ends up going out with her on a subsequent occasion and falls in love with her. His wife finally finds out and this leads to her leaving him and getting a divorce in Paris. He is married to the gold-digger but finds life with her and her "jazz friends" to be too much for him. He begins to long for his old wife when he finds her in a nightclub with another man and becomes jealous.

== Cast ==
- Belle Bennett as Helen Parr
- John Halliday as Brentwood Parr
- Dorothy Burgess as Peggy Price
- Richard Tucker as Rawlings
- Junior Durkin as Henry Parr
- Brooks Benedict as Pat

== Preservation ==
The film survives complete. It was transferred on to 16mm film by Associated Artists Productions in 1966 and shown on television. A 16mm copy is housed at the Wisconsin Center for Film & Theater Research. It is also preserved in the Library of Congress collection.
