= The Cisco Kid and the Lady =

1939 film by Herbert I. Leeds

- Directed by: Herbert I. Leeds
- Written by: Stanley Rauh; O. Henry
- Screenplay by: Frances Hyland
- Produced by: Sol M. Wurtzel
- Starring: Cesar Romero; Marjorie Weaver; Chris-Pin Martin
- Cinematography: Barney McGill
- Edited by: Nick DeMaggio
- Music by: Samuel Kaylin
- Distributed by: 20th Century Fox
- Release date: December 29, 1939
- Running time: 74 minutes
- Country: United States
- Language: English

The Cisco Kid and the Lady is a 1939 American Western film starring Cesar Romero as the Cisco Kid, replacing Warner Baxter, who had won the Academy Award for the role, and is the fifth film in The Cisco Kid series. For Cesar Romero, this was the first of six Cisco Kid roles.

== Plot summary ==
Kid and his partner, Gordito, and another outlaw named Harbison are each bequeathed a third interest in a gold mine of a dying prospector and whose only request is that they take care of his baby. In order to make sure that each keeps their promise, he tears the map of the mine in 3 parts.

== Cast ==
- Cesar Romero as Cisco Kid
- Marjorie Weaver as Julie Lawson
- Chris-Pin Martin as Gordito
- George Montgomery as Tommy Bates
- Robert Barrat as Jim Harbison
- Virginia Field as Billie Graham
- Harry Green as Teasdale
- Gloria Ann White as Baby
- John Beach as Stevens
- Ward Bond as Walton
- J. Anthony Hughes as Drake
- James Burke as Pop Saunders
- Harry Hayden as Sheriff
- James Flavin as Sergeant
- Ruth Warren as Ma Saunders
- Adrian Morris as Saloon Brawler

== Reception ==
Frank S. Nugent, of The New York Times, reviewed the film saying, "In sum, The Cisco Kid and the Lady is good old-fashioned horse opera and good entertainment to boot". Time Out London wrote that the film has "a shaggy-dog charm". Paul Mavis of DVD Talk rated it 3.5/5 stars and called it "completely satisfying". Patrick Naugle of DVD Verdict wrote, "The Cisco Kid and the Lady is standard western stuff (everything unfolds as you'd expect, with the requisite happy ending), but for what it is, it's amusing and goes down easy as a shot of tequila."

== Notes ==
Other films in which Cesar Romero played The Cisco Kid were:

- Ride on Vaquero (1941)
- Romance of the Rio Grande (1941)
- The Gay Caballero (1940)
- Lucky Cisco Kid (1940)
- Viva Cisco Kid (1940)
