= Larceny, Inc. =

1942 film by Lloyd Bacon

- 1942 theatrical poster
- Directed by: Lloyd Bacon
- Screenplay by: Everett Freeman; Edwin Gilbert
- Based on: The Night Before Christmas; 1941 play by Laura Perelman; S.J. Perelman
- Starring: Edward G. Robinson; Jane Wyman; Broderick Crawford; Jack Carson; Anthony Quinn
- Cinematography: Tony Gaudio
- Edited by: Ralph Dawson
- Music by: Adolph Deutsch
- Distributed by: Warner Bros. Pictures
- Release date: April 24, 1942
- Running time: 95 minutes
- Country: United States
- Language: English

Larceny, Inc. is a 1942 American crime comedy film. Originally released on May 2, 1942, by Warner Bros. Pictures, the film is a cross between comedy and gangster genres. Directed by Lloyd Bacon, the film stars Edward G. Robinson, Jane Wyman, Broderick Crawford, and Jack Carson, and features Anthony Quinn, and Edward Brophy. This was the third and final collaboration between Bacon and Robinson, having previously made the crime comedies A Slight Case of Murder (1938) and Brother Orchid (1940).

The film is based on the play The Night Before Christmas by Laura Perelman and S.J. Perelman.

== Plot ==
Suave convict J. Chalmers "Pressure" Maxwell decides to go straight. Just before he is released from Sing Sing prison along with his none-too-bright accomplice Jug Martin, he rejects a proposal by fellow inmate Leo Dexter to rob a bank.

Maxwell hopes to purchase a dog racing track in Florida and become a legitimate businessman with Denny Costello, his adopted daughter. However, he lacks the funds necessary. When his loan request is rejected by the bank (the same one Leo planned to rob), he decides to rob the place. Noticing a luggage shop next door, he buys the store from Homer Bigelow. He has Jug and their friend Weepy Davis start digging a tunnel in the basement.

Meanwhile, slick salesman Jeff Randolph convinces Weepy to order several dozen pieces of luggage to stock the store. Soon afterward, Jeff falls in love with Denny. When Denny discovers Pressure's scheme, she gets Jeff to create various advertising gimmicks that bring in a flood of customers, forcing a stop to the noisy digging and showing the crooks that legitimate sales can be profitable.

The store flourishes, and the bank next door offers to purchase it from them to expand its space. Pressure is ready to accept the offer, but when Leo learns that Pressure has stolen his idea, he breaks out of jail to take over. Due to the success of the luggage business, Pressure has abandoned the robbery plan, but Leo forces them to go through with it.

Leo plans on breaking into the vault with dynamite on Christmas Eve. Complicating matters, Homer Bigelow reappears, nostalgic for his store. He gets knocked out, but manages to press the burglar alarm. Leo panics and reaches for his gun, but Pressure intervenes, and then he is knocked unconscious. Leo tries to escape, only to be caught by the police. The store erupts in flames, but Pressure revives and manages to drag Homer Bigelow outside, becoming a hero.

Denny accepts Jeff's marriage proposal. Pressure makes plans to build a new store, the first in a chain.

== Cast ==
- Edward G. Robinson as J. Chalmers "Pressure" Maxwell
- Jane Wyman as Denny Costello
- Broderick Crawford as Jug Martin
- Jack Carson as Jeff Randolph
- Anthony Quinn as Leo Dexter
- Edward Brophy as Weepy Davis
- Harry Davenport as Homer Bigelow
- John Qualen as Sam Bachrach, a neighboring businessman
- Barbara Jo Allen as Mademoiselle Gloria
- Grant Mitchell as Mr. Aspinwall
- Jackie Gleason as Hobart/Soda Shop Clerk
- Kitty Kelly as the fourth customer (uncredited)
- Emory Parnell as Police Officer O'Casey

== Analysis ==
The plot of Woody Allen's Small Time Crooks is similar to the plot of Larceny, Inc. Allen never has commented on whether this was deliberate or if his film was in any way inspired by Larceny, Inc.

Robinson took the role of Pressure Maxwell in this film to offset his "tough guy" image as established in his many appearances as gangsters or police officers in previous Warner Bros. films.

The film features many members of the Warner Bros. "stock company" and included an early film appearance by Jackie Gleason as a drug store soda jerk.
