= Rosemary DeCamp =

American actress (1910–2001)

- DeCamp in 1950
- Born: November 14, 1910; Prescott, Arizona Territory, U.S.
- Died: February 20, 2001 (aged 90); Newport Beach, California, U.S.
- Occupation: Actress
- Years active: 1937–1989
- Spouse: John Ashton Shidler (m. 1941; died 1998)
- Children: 4

Rosemary Shirley DeCamp (November 14, 1910 – February 20, 2001) was an American radio, film, and television actress.

== Life and career ==
=== Early life ===
Rosemary Shirley DeCamp was born in Prescott, Yavapai County, Arizona on November 14, 1910 to William Valentine DeCamp and Margaret Elizabeth Hinman.

=== Radio ===
DeCamp first came to fame in November 1937, when she took the role of Judy Price, the secretary/nurse of Dr. Christian in the long-running Dr. Christian radio series. She also played in The Career of Alice Blair, a transcribed syndicated soap opera that ran in 1939–1940.

=== Film and television ===
She made her film debut in Cheers for Miss Bishop and appeared in many Warner Bros. films, including Eyes in the Night, Yankee Doodle Dandy playing Nellie Cohan opposite James Cagney, This Is the Army playing the wife of George Murphy and the mother of Ronald Reagan, Rhapsody in Blue, and Nora Prentiss. She played the mother of the character played by Sabu Dastagir in Jungle Book.

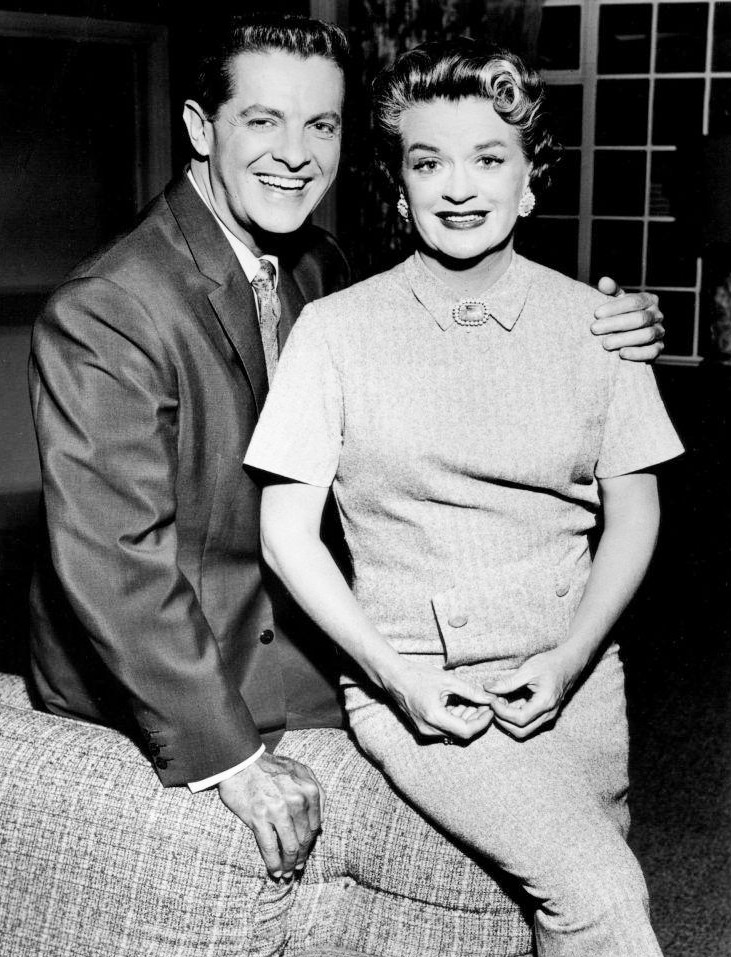
DeCamp with Bob Cummings, star of the Bob Cummings Show (1959)

In 1951 and 1953, respectively, she starred in the nostalgic musical films On Moonlight Bay and its sequel, By The Light Of The Silvery Moon, as Alice Winfield, Doris Day's mother, opposite Leon Ames.

DeCamp played Peg Riley in the first television version of The Life of Riley opposite Jackie Gleason in the 1949–1950 season, then reprised the role on radio with original star William Bendix for an episode of Lux Radio Theater in 1950. From 1955–1959, she was a regular on the popular NBC television comedy The Bob Cummings Show, playing Margaret MacDonald.

She appeared in the 1961 Rawhide episode, "Incident Near Gloomy River". In 1962, she played a dishonest Southern belle in the NBC sitcom Ensign O'Toole with Dean Jones. She appeared in the role of Gertrude Komack on ABC's medical drama Breaking Point in the episode entitled "A Little Anger is a Good Thing".

DeCamp appeared twice in different roles on Death Valley Days. In 1965, she played newspaper editor Caroline Romney of Durango, Colorado, in the episode "Mrs. Romney and the Outlaws". She portrayed Hannah Bailey, wife of James Briton "Brit" Bailey, in the 1969 episode "Here Stands Bailey". During the 1960s, she appeared in commercials for the laundry product 20 Mule Team Borax, which sponsored Death Valley Days.

DeCamp had a recurring role as Helen Marie, the mother of Marlo Thomas's character on the ABC sitcom That Girl from 1966–1970. She appeared in several 1968 episodes of the CBS sitcom Petticoat Junction as Kate Bradley's sister, Helen, filling in as a temporary replacement for the ailing Bea Benaderet as the mother figure to Bradley's three daughters. DeCamp also appeared in 1962 in the TV series Hazel starring Shirley Booth as Hazel's wealthy cousin Sybil.

DeCamp appeared in 2 episodes of The Beverly Hillbillies as Mrs Priscilla Rolfe Alden Smith-Standish, a famous expert on antiquities who befriended the Clampetts.

DeCamp made several appearances as the mother of Shirley Partridge in The Partridge Family from 1970–1973. She also played The Fairy Godmother in the 1980s TV show, The Memoirs of a Fairy Godmother.

DeCamp played Buck Rogers' mother in flashback scenes of the Buck Rogers in the 25th Century episode "The Guardians" (1981). She played her last role on television in the Murder, She Wrote episode "Dead Letter" in 1989.

On July 7, 1946, her Beverly Hills home was damaged when struck by a wing after the experimental XF-11 piloted by Howard Hughes (re-created in the 2004 movie, The Aviator) crashed nearby. Although a piece of the wing and a part of the neighbor's roof landed in DeCamp's bedroom (where she and her husband were sleeping) they sustained no injuries.

== Personal life and death ==
DeCamp was married to Inglewood Municipal Judge John Ashton Shidler for 57 years from 1941 until his death in 1998. The Shidlers raised four daughters: Margaret, Martha, Valerie, and Nita. Outliving most of her contemporaries, DeCamp died of pneumonia in 2001, age 90. She was cremated and her ashes given to her daughter.

DeCamp was the author of a children's book, Here, Duke! The Adventures of an Irish Setter, which was published by the David McKay Company, in 1962. In 2009, an autobiographical book of her life in film and television titled Rosemary De Camp: Tigers in My Lap was published posthumously.

DeCamp was raised in an Irish Catholic household but later converted to Episcopalian, becoming an active parishioner at St. Francis Episcopal Church in Palos Verdes Estates, California, where her funeral service was subsequently held.

DeCamp was an active Democrat. Financially and socially conscious, she was a member of the Hollywood Democratic Committee and the Committee for the First Amendment. Alongside fellow actress and longtime friend Marsha Hunt, she worked extensively on humanitarian and grassroots advocacy projects involving equal rights, affordable housing, food banks, mental health awareness, and establishing shelter services for the homeless.

== Filmography ==
- Cheers for Miss Bishop (1941) as Minna Fields
- Hold Back the Dawn (1941) as Berta Kurz
- Jungle Book (1942) as Messua
- Yankee Doodle Dandy (1942) as Nellie Cohan
- Smith of Minnesota (1942) as Mrs. Smith
- Eyes in the Night (1942) as Vera Hoffman
- Commandos Strike at Dawn (1942) as Hilma Arnesen
- City Without Men (1943) as Mrs. Slade
- This Is the Army (1943) as Ethel Jones
- The Merry Monahans (1944) as Lillian Miles
- Bowery to Broadway (1944) as Bessie Kirby
- Practically Yours (1944) as Ellen Macy
- Blood on the Sun (1945) as Edith Miller
- Rhapsody in Blue (1945) as Rose Gershwin
- Pride of the Marines (1945) as Virginia Pfeiffer
- Week-End at the Waldorf (1945) as Anna
- Danger Signal (1945) as Dr. Jane Silla
- Too Young to Know (1945) as Mrs. Enright
- From This Day Forward (1946) as Martha Beesley
- Two Guys from Milwaukee (1946) as Nan
- Nora Prentiss (1947) as Lucy Talbot
- The Life of Riley (1949) as Peg Riley
- Night Unto Night (1949) as Thalia Shawn
- Look for the Silver Lining (1949) as Mama Miller
- The Story of Seabiscuit (1949) as Mrs. Charles S. Howard
- The Big Hangover (1950) as Claire Bellcap
- Night into Morning (1951) as Mrs. Annie Ainley
- On Moonlight Bay (1951) as Alice Winfield
- Scandal Sheet (1952) as Charlotte Grant
- The Treasure of Lost Canyon (1952) as Samuella
- By the Light of the Silvery Moon (1953) as Alice Winfield
- Main Street to Broadway (1953) as Mrs. Craig
- Man on a Bus (1955)
- Many Rivers to Cross (1955) as Lucy Hamilton
- Strategic Air Command (1955) as Mrs. Thorne
- 13 Ghosts (1960) as Hilda Zorba
- Rawhide (1961) – Mrs. Armstrong in S4:E27, "Incident Near Gloomy River"
- The Beverly Hillbillies (1963) as Priscilla Rolfe Alden Smith-Standish
- That Girl (1966-1971) as Mrs. Marie
- Petticoat Junction (1964) as Emily Mapes, (1968) Aunt Helen
- The Misadventures of Sheriff Lobo (1980) as Mrs. Lobo
- Saturday the 14th (1981) as Aunt Lucille
- Buck Rogers in the 25th Century (1981) as Buck's mother
- B.J. and the Bear (1981) as Hatsie Tipton
- A Chip of Glass Ruby (1983) as Mother
