= Once More, My Darling =

1949 film

- Film poster
- Directed by: Robert Montgomery
- Written by: Robert Carson; Oscar Saul (additional dialogue)
- Produced by: Joan Harrison
- Starring: Robert Montgomery; Ann Blyth; Jane Cowl
- Cinematography: Franz Planer
- Edited by: Ralph Dawson
- Music by: Elizabeth Firestone
- Production company: Neptune Productions
- Distributed by: Universal-International
- Release date: August 10, 1949
- Running time: 92 minutes
- Country: United States
- Language: English

Once More, My Darling is a 1949 American comedy film directed by and starring Robert Montgomery alongside Ann Blyth, Jane Cowl and Charles McGraw. The film was nominated for an Academy Award for Best Sound Recording (Leslie I. Carey).

== Plot ==
Collier "Collie" Laing, a confirmed bachelor, still lives with his mother, a high-powered attorney. When he is unexpectedly called up by the United States Army Reserve with the rank of captain, Collier is given a peculiar assignment.

Superior officer Colonel Head, cooperating with law enforcement, tells Collier about a jewel heist and how one of the gems has been spotted in a perfume ad, worn by Marita "Killer" Connell, a young actress. There is suspicion that a jewel thief who loves Marita gave her this stolen item, not telling her where or how he got it.

Collier's odd assignment is to romance the young lady. Pretending to be a survey taker, he makes her acquaintance at a Beverly Hills hotel where Marita is immediately smitten. So much so that she insists on meeting his mother, crashing Mrs. Laing's party of distinguished guests in an altogether unsuitable outfit and offending them with the scent of her terrible perfume.

Marita manages to coax Collier into driving her to Las Vegas to get married. He tries to stall, then finally blurts out that he has no intention of marrying Marita when the jealous jewel thief bursts in on them. Collier must fight off him, then Marita's chauffeur, then even a passing truck driver.

A heartbroken and angry Marita wants nothing more to do with him, which is about the same time Collier realizes that he really has fallen in love with her.

== Cast ==
- Robert Montgomery as Collier "Collie" Laing
- Ann Blyth as Marita Connell
- Jane Cowl as Mrs. Laing
- Charles McGraw as Herman Schmelz, Chauffeur
- Taylor Holmes as Jed Connell
- Roland Winters as Colonel Head
- Steven Geray as Kalzac
- John Ridgely as Burke
- Lillian Randolph as Mamie
- Maurice Cass as Dr. Grasser
- Don Beddoe as Judge Fraser
- Louise Lorimer as Mrs. Fraser
- Wilton Graff as Mr. Frobisher
- Sally Corner as Mrs. Frobisher
- Barbara Payton as Girl Photographer, Uncredited
