= I Can't Give You Anything But Love, Baby (film) =

1940 film directed by Albert S. Rogell

- Directed by: Albert S. Rogell
- Written by: Paul Gerard Smith (adaptation)
- Screenplay by: Arthur T. Horman
- Story by: James Edward Grant
- Starring: Broderick Crawford; Jessie Ralph; Johnny Downs; Peggy Moran
- Cinematography: Elwood Bredell
- Edited by: Frank Gross
- Distributed by: Universal Pictures
- Release date: May 1940
- Running time: 61 minutes
- Country: United States
- Language: English

I Can't Give You Anything But Love, Baby is a 1940 American musical comedy film starring Broderick Crawford and Jessie Ralph. It was also released under the title Trouble in B flat.

== Cast ==
- Broderick Crawford as Sonny McGann
- Jessie Ralph as Mama McGann
- Johnny Downs as Bob Gunther
- Peggy Moran as Linda Carroll
- Gertrude Michael as Magsa Delys / Sadie
- Warren Hymer as Big Foot Louie

== Production ==
Around the time that the film was produced, Universal Studios were producing a number of musicals named after well-known songs, such as Ma, He's Making Eyes At Me and I'm Nobody's Sweetheart Now.

I Can't Give You Anything But Love, Baby was named after a 1928 song of the same name, written by Jimmy McHugh and Dorothy Fields. McHugh agreed with the use of the title song in the film, sung by Peggy Moran, but did not want to compose further songs for the film's soundtrack. The rest of the film's songs were composed by Frank Skinner and Paul Smith and included the titles "The Tomato Juice Song" and "Sweetheart of Public School 59".
