= Kay Griffith =

American actress (1915–2002)

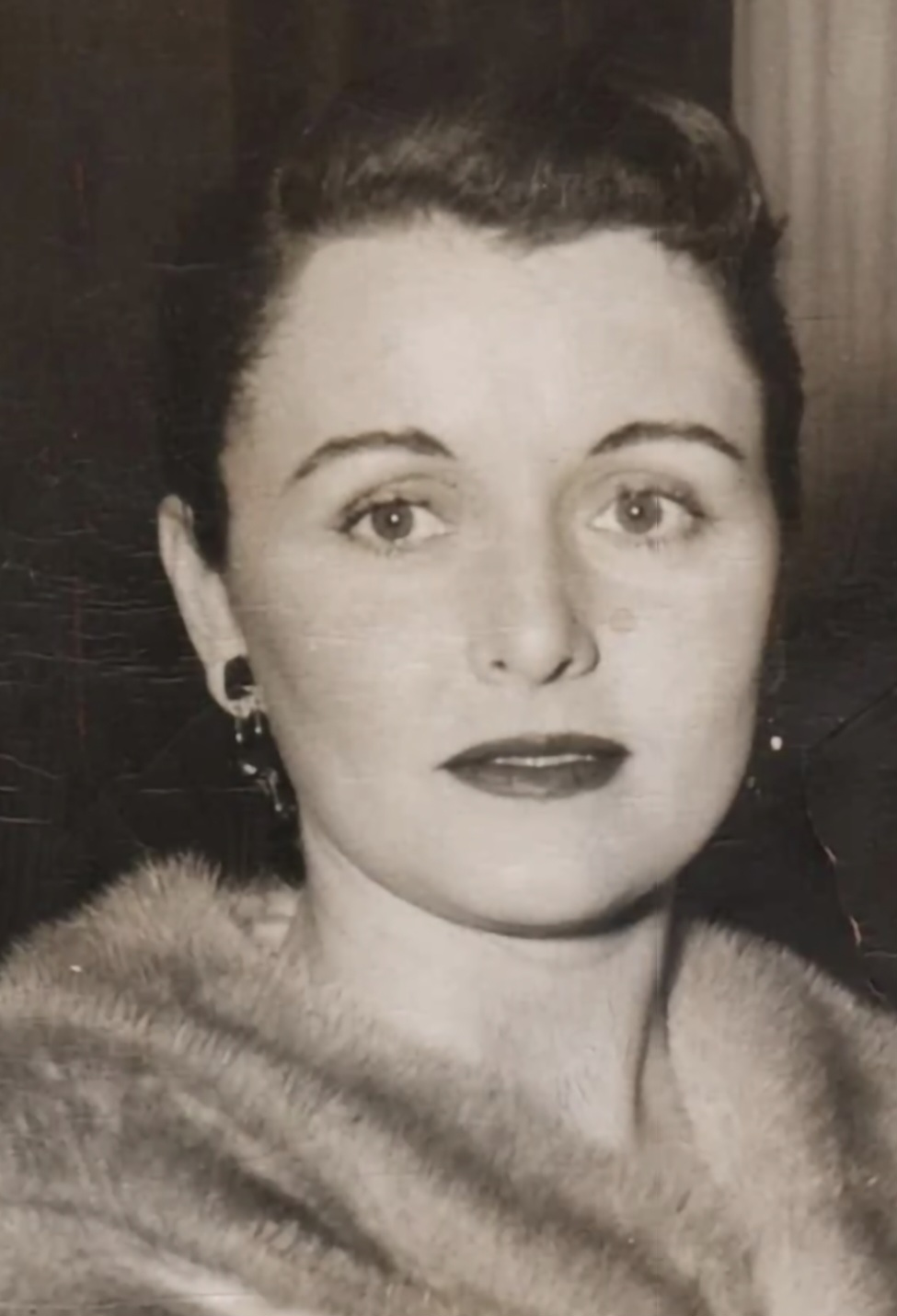
- Griffith in 1955
- Born: Katherine Margaret Griffith; September 10, 1915; Chicago, Illinois, U.S.
- Died: December 10, 2002 (aged 87)
- Education: University of Chicago
- Occupation: Actress
- Years active: 1936–1940
- Spouse: Broderick Crawford (m. 1940; div. 1957)
- Children: 3

Katherine Margaret Griffith (September 10, 1915 – December 10, 2002) was an American film actress from 1936 to 1940 who appeared in Western films and serials. She made 14 films, the last being Covered Wagon Days (1940) in which she was the female lead alongside The Three Mesquiteers.

== Early life and career ==
Born and raised in Chicago, Griffith was the eldest of two daughters born to Florence Brown and Lawrence Griffith. After attending the University of Chicago, she moved to San Francisco, working as a model until an opportunity to sing in a hotel's supper room provided an entry into entertainment. Later a film scout saw her singing with an orchestra in Los Angeles, and that led to Griffith acting in films.

In 1936, a Superior Court judge in Los Angeles approved a contract for her to work for Paramount. In 1938 she was signed by 20th Century Fox.

== Personal life ==
Griffith's parents died in 1932, at which time she began to care for and support her younger sister, Rita. In 1940 she went to court in Los Angeles to become the legal guardian of Rita, who was then 15 years old.

Griffith married actor Broderick Crawford on November 21, 1940, in Hollywood, California. When they applied for the marriage license, Griffith said that she would cease acting so that the marriage would last.

On November 2, 1941, she gave birth prematurely to a girl, Kathleen Crawford, who died six days later, despite a blood transfusion from the father. Griffith and Crawford later had two sons, the older of whom was adopted. The marriage ended in divorce on July 8, 1957.

== Filmography ==
- Easy to Take (1936) as Mary (uncredited)
- College Holiday (1936) as dancer (uncredited)
- Kentucky Moonshine (1938) as telephone operator (uncredited)
- Alexander's Ragtime Band (1938) as autograph seeker (uncredited)
- Always Goodbye (1938) as nurse (uncredited)
- My Lucky Star (1938) as Ethel
- Five of a Kind (1938) as airplane stewardess (uncredited)
- Wife, Husband and Friend (1939) as Nancy Sprague
- It Could Happen to You (1939) as minor role (uncredited)
- Hotel for Women (1939) as model (uncredited)
- Swanee River (1939) as bit role (uncredited)
- Free, Blonde and 21 (1940) as clerk (uncredited)
- Star Dust (1940) as stenographer (uncredited)
- Covered Wagon Days (1940) as Maria
