= Treat 'Em Rough =

1942 film by Ray Taylor

- Directed by: Ray Taylor
- Written by: Roy Chanslor
- Starring: Eddie Albert; Peggy Moran; William Frawley
- Cinematography: George Robinson
- Music by: Hans J. Salter
- Distributed by: Universal Pictures
- Release date: 1942
- Running time: 61 minutes
- Country: United States
- Language: English

Treat 'Em Rough is a 1942 film about a boxer directed by Ray Taylor and starring Eddie Albert.

== Plot ==
Bill Kingsford, a prizefighter called the Panama Kid (Eddie Albert), returns to his hometown with his trainer Hotfoot (William Frawley (who later played "Fred Mertz" on I Love Lucy) and valet Snake Eyes (Mantan Moreland) when his father (Lloyd Corrigan) is accused of embezzling.

Bill becomes involved with his father's ravishing secretary (Peggy Moran), who tips him off that she overheard a couple of men planning to ambush Bill while he investigates his father's scandal. When one of those men is killed, police mistake the dead body's for Bill. He uses the time to solve the mystery and clear his dad's name.

== Cast ==
- Eddie Albert as the Panama Kid (Bill Kingsford)
- Peggy Moran as Betty
- William Frawley as Hotfoot
- Lloyd Corrigan as Gray Kingsford
- Mantan Moreland as Snake Eyes

== See also ==
- List of boxing films
