= Broderick Crawford =

American actor (1911–1986)

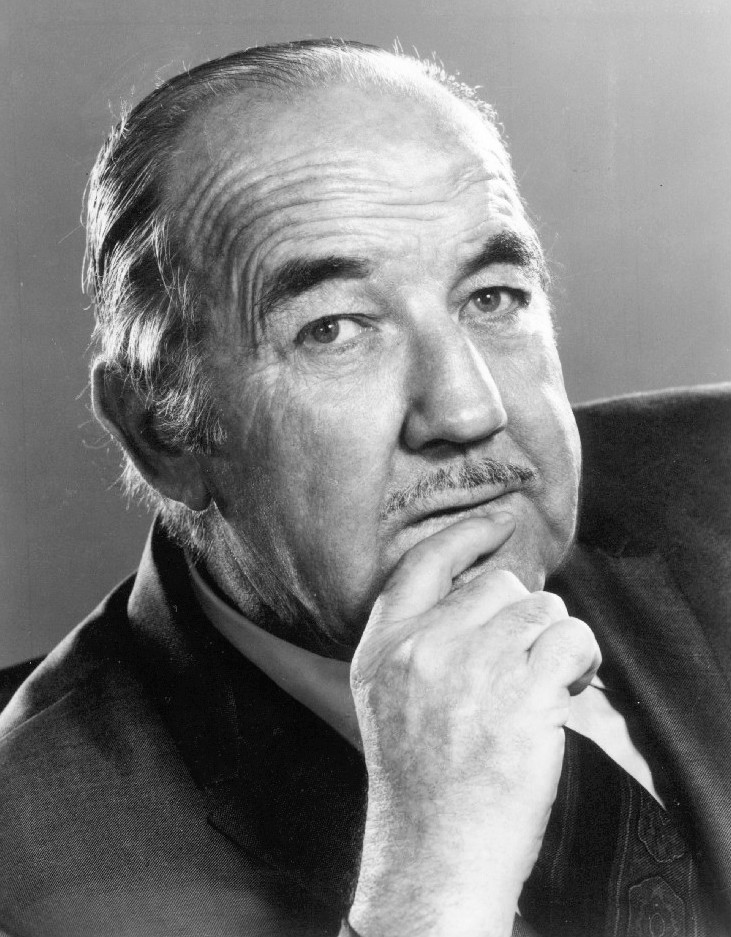
- Crawford in The Interns (1971)
- Born: William Broderick Crawford; December 9, 1911; Philadelphia, Pennsylvania, U.S.
- Died: April 26, 1986 (aged 74); Rancho Mirage, California, U.S.
- Occupation: Actor
- Years active: 1931–1985
- Spouses: Kay Griffith (m. 1940; div. 1957) Joan Tabor (m. 1962; div. 1967) Mary Alice Moore (m. 1973)
- Children: 2
- Mother: Helen Broderick
- Awards: See below
- Military career
- Allegiance: United States
- Branch: United States Army; Army Air Forces
- Service years: 1942-1945
- Rank: Sergeant
- Unit: Armed Forces Network

William Broderick Crawford (December 9, 1911 – April 26, 1986) was an American actor. Known for his "bulldog face and barking voice", he was initially a character actor often cast tough-guy or slob roles, but gained widespread acclaim for his portrayal of Willie Stark in the 1949 film adaptation of Robert Penn Warren's All the King's Men. His performance earned him both an Academy Award and a Golden Globe for Best Actor. He was later known for his starring role as Dan Mathews on the television series Highway Patrol (1955–59).

== Early life ==
Crawford was born in Philadelphia, Pennsylvania, to Lester Crawford (né Lester Crawford Pendergast) and Helen Broderick, who were both vaudeville performers, as his grandparents had been. Lester appeared in films in the 1920s and 1930s. Helen Broderick had a career in Hollywood comedies, including appearances in the Fred Astaire and Ginger Rogers musicals Top Hat and Swing Time.

Notwithstanding his family's relative prominence, Crawford's childhood and adolescence remain sparsely documented, with a 1977 Saturday Night Live documentary segment essentially intimating that he was raised in the violent, alcohol-sodden and predominantly working class milieu of Midtown Manhattan's Hell's Kitchen district (long favored by actors due to its traditionally low rents and convenient proximity to various entertainment venues, most notably Broadway theatre). In the segment, he also reminisced of overnight sleepovers in Central Park with his friends.

Throughout his childhood, Crawford and his parents performed on the stage for producer Max Gordon. Despite a desultory formal education, he was accepted by Harvard College, where he ultimately enrolled. After three months of studies, he dropped out to work as a stevedore on the New York docks.

== Career ==
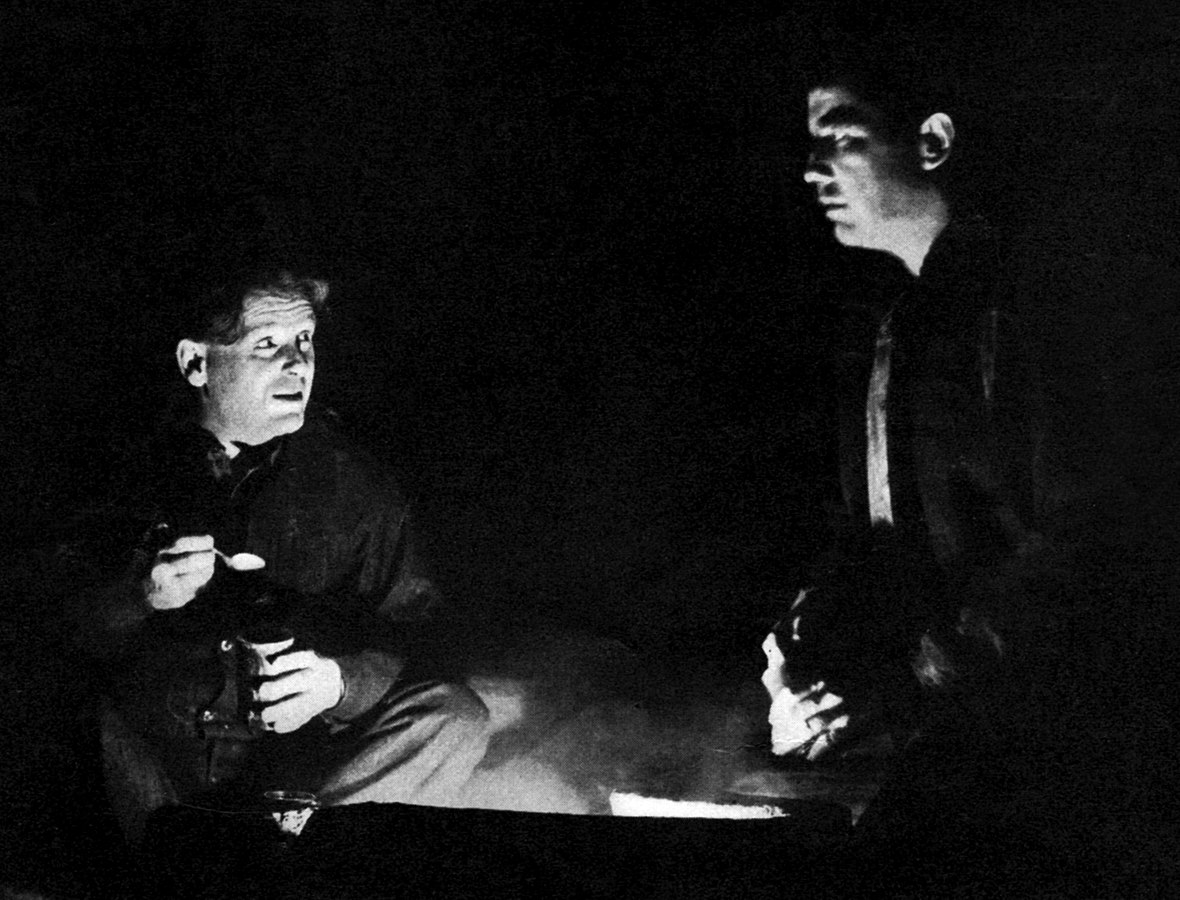
Wallace Ford and Crawford (right) in the original 1938 Broadway production Of Mice and Men

Crawford returned to vaudeville and radio, which included a period with the Marx Brothers in the radio comedy show Flywheel, Shyster, and Flywheel.

He played his first serious character as a footballer in She Loves Me Not at the Adelphi Theatre, London in 1932. Crawford was originally stereotyped as a fast-talking tough guy early in his career and often played villainous parts. In 1935, he appeared on Broadway in Sweet Mystery of Life, and Brooks Atkinson noted his "rangy style of comedy in the part of a collegiate lad who is always spoiling for a brawl."

He gained fame in 1937 as Lennie in Of Mice and Men on Broadway. Subsequently, he moved permanently to Hollywood and to work in films.

=== Early films ===
Crawford made his film debut for Sam Goldwyn in Woman Chases Man (1937). He was in Start Cheering (1938) at Columbia but missed out on reprising his stage performance as Lenny in the film version of Of Mice and Men, losing it to Lon Chaney Jr.

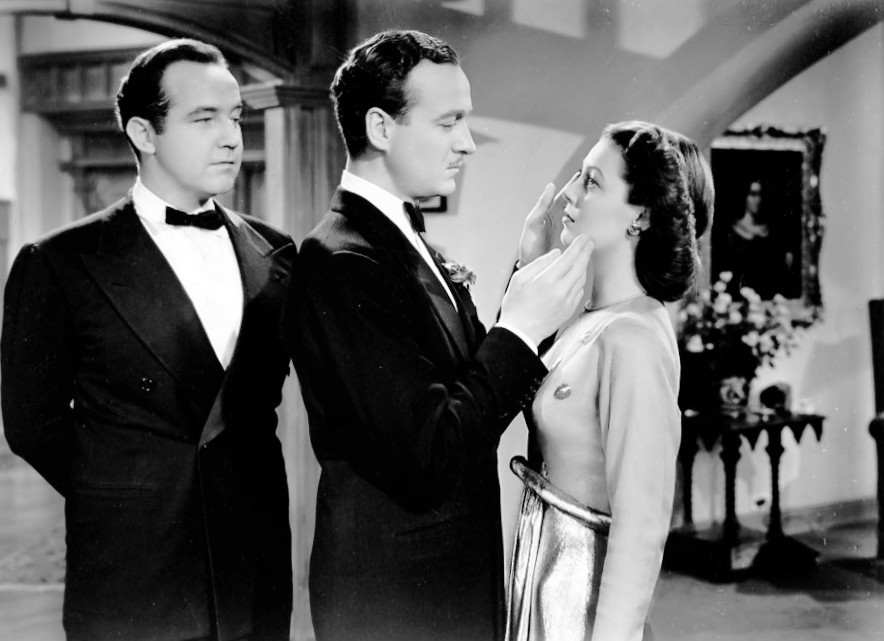
Crawford, David Niven and Loretta Young in Eternally Yours (1939)

Crawford appeared in several B films before landing supporting roles in Beau Geste starring Gary Cooper, The Real Glory (1939), starring Cooper with David Niven, and Eternally Yours (1939) starring Niven and Loretta Young.

Universal gave Crawford the leading role in a "B" picture, I Can't Give You Anything But Love, Baby (1940). A series of supporting parts followed, most notably in Seven Sinners (1940), The Black Cat (1941), and Larceny, Inc.(1942).

During World War II, Crawford served in the United States Army Air Corps. Assigned to the Armed Forces Network, he was sent to Britain in 1944 as a sergeant and was one of two announcers for the Glenn Miller Band's weekly program I Sustain the Wings.

=== All the King's Men and stardom ===
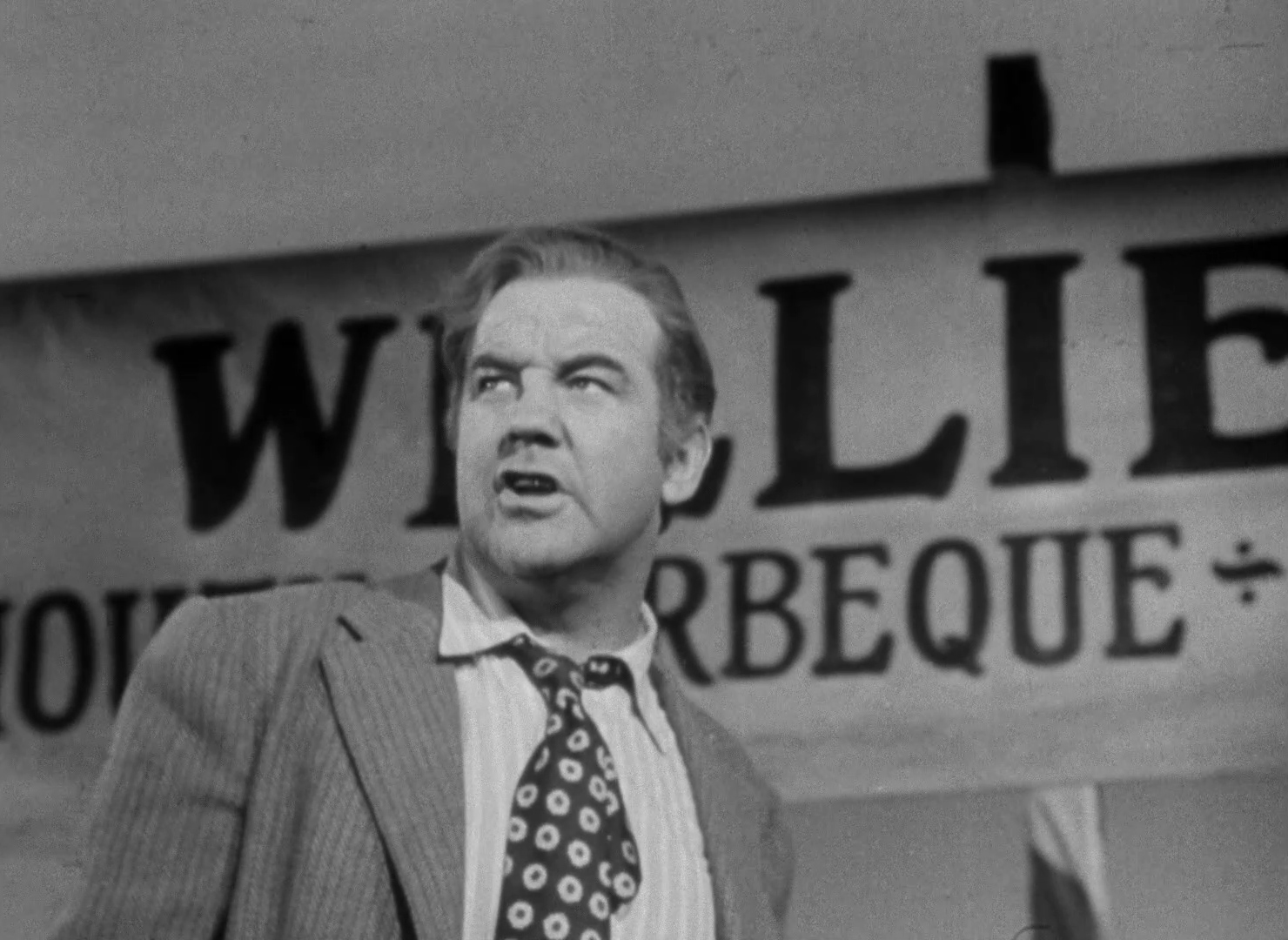
Crawford as Willie Stark in All the King's Men (1949)

In 1949, Crawford was cast as Willie Stark, a character inspired by and closely patterned after the life of Louisiana politician Huey Long, in All the King's Men, based on the novel by Robert Penn Warren. The film was a huge hit, and Crawford won the Academy Award for Best Actor.

Crawford went on to make several major films in the first half of the 1950s, including Born Yesterday (1950), Lone Star (1952), Last of the Comanches (1953), and Night People (1954).

In 1955, Crawford took on the starring role of Rollo Lamar, the most violent of convicts in Big House, U.S.A., in which Crawford's character is a hardened convict so violent he commands the obedience of even the most violent and psychotic prisoners in the prison yard, followed by a co-starring role in the hit Not as a Stranger (1955).

=== Highway Patrol ===
In 1955, television producer Frederick Ziv of ZIV Television Productions offered Crawford the lead role in the police drama Highway Patrol, which dramatized law enforcement activities of the California Highway Patrol (CHP). ZIV operated on a low budget of $25,000 per episode, with ten percent of gross receipts going to Crawford. While the show's scripts were largely fictional, the use of realistic, rapid-fire dialogue, stark film noir style and Crawford's convincing portrayal of a hard-as-nails police officer made the show an instant success. Highway Patrol remained popular during its four years (1955–1959) of first-run syndication, and continued in rerun syndication across the United States for many years. From 1955 until 1965, most of Crawford's television roles were for ZIV, which was one of the few producers willing to accept the challenges of working with the hard-living and alcoholic Crawford. Years later, Frederick Ziv said, "To be honest, Broderick could be a handful!"

Highway Patrol revived Crawford's career and cemented his tough-guy persona, which he used successfully in numerous roles for the rest of his life.

During the series' run he was in three significant films: The Fastest Gun Alive (1956) for director Russell Rouse at MGM, Between Heaven and Hell (1956) with Robert Wagner at Fox, directed by Richard Fleischer, and The Decks Ran Red (1958) with James Mason for Andrew L. Stone.

Fed up with its hectic shooting schedule, Crawford quit Highway Patrol at the end of 1959 to make a film in Spain.

Crawford's successful run on Highway Patrol earned him two million dollars, and he re-signed with ZIV for King of Diamonds. Having temporarily stopped drinking, Crawford played the starring role as diamond industry security chief John King. King of Diamonds was picked up for syndication in 1961, but lasted only one season, after which Crawford returned to motion pictures, most notably in The Oscar (1966) and The Texican (1966).

=== 1970s ===
After 1970, Crawford returned to television. Along with numerous guestings on TV series and TV movies, he was Dr. Peter Goldstone in The Interns and starred as J. Edgar Hoover in The Private Files of J. Edgar Hoover.

In 1977, he wore the trademark fedora and black suit as guest host of NBC's Saturday Night Live that included a spoof of Highway Patrol. He parodied his Dan Mathews character again that year in a commercial for Canada Dry Ginger Ale with Aldo Ray and Jack Palance. In an episode of CHiPs, Crawford appeared as himself, recognized after being stopped by Officer Poncherello Erik Estrada, who presses a reluctant Crawford to give his trademark line from Highway Patrol ("Twenty-One-Fifty to Headquarters").

In 1979, Crawford had a cameo in the film A Little Romance, and his last role was as a film producer who is murdered in a 1982 episode of Simon & Simon. Co-starring with him was Stuart Whitman, who had the recurring role of Sergeant Walters on Highway Patrol.

Crawford is referenced in the 1977 film Smokey and the Bandit when an Alabama State Patrol officer angrily confronts Sheriff Buford T. Justice (Jackie Gleason) and his damaged vehicle with its horn that won't stop blaring. When Justice starts to introduce himself, the trooper retorts, "I don't care if your name is Broderick Crawford."

== Personal life ==
Crawford was married three times:

- Kay Griffith (married 1940, divorced 1957)
- Joan Tabor (married 1962, divorced 1967)
- Mary Alice Moore (married 1973)

He had two children with his first wife, including visual effects artist Kelly G. Crawford (1951-2012).

Throughout his adult life, Crawford was prone to bouts of heavy drinking and often ate large meals. These habits contributed to a serious weight gain during the 1950s.

Crawford's drinking increased during the filming of Highway Patrol, eventually resulting in several arrests and stops for driving under the influence of alcohol (DUI), which eventually gained him a suspended driving license. Eventually the drinking strained the show's relationship with the CHP as well as Crawford's relationship with ZIV.

Fellow actor Stuart Whitman became a close friend of Crawford. In an interview Whitman said they clicked when he was first cast in an episode of Highway Patrol. Whitman said that if he was low on cash, he'd ask Crawford to bring his character (Sgt. Walters) back to the show, something Crawford was more than happy to do, in part because Whitman could be trusted with dialogue-heavy scenes, allowing Crawford more time for drinking. Whitman said he returned the favor by helping Crawford get cast in The Decks Ran Red (1958). Whitman promised the producers that Crawford would stay sober throughout the shoot, and he did.

=== Death ===
Crawford died in 1986, aged 74 after a series of strokes.

== Legacy ==
Crawford has two stars on the Hollywood Walk of Fame. One for motion pictures at 6901 Hollywood Boulevard, and another for television at 6734 Hollywood Boulevard.

His popularity on Highway Patrol led to him being memorialized in the poker game of Texas hold 'em; a starting hand of a 10-4 (a common police radio code) is nicknamed a "Broderick Crawford".

In season 14/episode 80 of Family Feud, Steve Harvey disclosed that his real name is Broderick Stephen Harvey, and he was named after Broderick Crawford.

== Filmography ==
=== Film ===
Year	Title	Role	Notes
1937	Woman Chases Man	Hunk	
1938	Start Cheering	Biff Gordon	
1939	Ambush	Randall	
1939	Sudden Money	Doc Finney	
1939	Undercover Doctor	Eddie Krator	
1939	Beau Geste	Hank Miller	
1939	Island of Lost Men	Tex Ballister	
1939	The Real Glory	Lt. Larson	
1939	Eternally Yours	Don Burns	
1939	Slightly Honorable	Russ Sampson	
1940	I Can't Give You Anything But Love, Baby	Sonny McGann	
1940	When the Daltons Rode	Bob Dalton	
1940	Seven Sinners	Little Ned	
1940	Trail of the Vigilantes	Swanee	
1940	Texas Rangers Ride Again	Mace Townsley	
1941	The Black Cat	Gil Smith	
1941	Tight Shoes	Speedy Miller	
1941	Badlands of Dakota	Bob Holliday	
1941	South of Tahiti	Chuck	
1942	North to the Klondike	John Thorn	
1942	Butch Minds the Baby	Butch Grogan	
1942	Larceny, Inc.	Jug Martin	
1942	Broadway	Steve Crandall	
1942	Men of Texas	Henry Clay Jackson	
1942	Sin Town	Dude McNair	
1942	Keeping Fit	Brod	
1946	The Runaround	Louis Prentiss	
1946	Black Angel	Capt. Flood	
1947	Slave Girl	Chips Jackson	
1947	The Flame	Ernie Hicks	
1948	The Time of Your Life	Krupp	
1948	Sealed Verdict	Capt. Kinsella	
1949	Bad Men of Tombstone	William Morgan	
1949	A Kiss in the Dark	Mr. Botts	
1949	Night Unto Night	C.L. Shawn	
1949	Anna Lucasta	Frank	
1949	All the King's Men	Willie Stark	
1950	Cargo to Capetown	Johnny Phelan	
1950	Convicted	George Knowland	
1950	Born Yesterday	Harry Brock	
1951	The Mob	Johnny Damico	
1952	Scandal Sheet	Mark Chapman / George Grant	
1952	Lone Star	Thomas Craden	
1952	Rainbow 'Round My Shoulder	Himself	Uncredited cameo
1952	Stop, You're Killing Me	Remy Marko	
1953	Last of the Comanches	Sgt. Matt Trainor	
1953	The Last Posse	Sheriff John Frazier	
1954	Night People	Charles Leatherby	
1954	Human Desire	Carl Buckley	
1954	Down Three Dark Streets	FBI Agent John 'Rip' Ripley	
1955	New York Confidential	Charlie Lupo	
1955	Big House, U.S.A.	Rollo Lamar	
1955	Man on a Bus	Nahum	Short film
1955	Not as a Stranger	Dr. Aarons	
1955	Il bidone	Augusto	
1956	The Fastest Gun Alive	Vinnie Harold	
1956	Between Heaven and Hell	Capt. 'Waco' Grimes	
1958	The Decks Ran Red	Henry Scott	
1960	Goliath and the Dragon	King Eurystheus	
1961	Square of Violence	Dr. Stefan Bernardi	
1962	Convicts 4	Warden	
1963	The Castilian	Don Sancho	
1963	No temas a la ley	Man in Hotel	Uncredited cameo
1964	A House Is Not a Home	Harrigan	
1965	Up from the Beach	MP Major	
1966	Kid Rodelo	Joe Harbin	
1966	Mutiny at Fort Sharpe	Col. Lenox	
1966	The Oscar	Sheriff	
1966	The Texican	Luke Starr	
1966	The Vulture	Brian F. Stroud	
1967	Red Tomahawk	Columbus Smith	
1970	Ransom Money	Insp. Joseph Medford	
1970	Hell's Bloody Devils	Gavin	
1970	Maharlika	Gen. Hadley	
1970	How Did a Nice Girl Like You Get Into This Business?	B.J. Hankins	
1970	Gregorio and His Angel	Gregorio	
1970	The Yin and the Yang of Mr. Go	Parker	
1972	Embassy	Frank Dunniger	
1972	The Candidate	Commercial Narrator (voice)	Uncredited
1973	Terror in the Wax Museum	Amos Burns	
1975	Death Brings Roses	Bartender	
1976	Won Ton Ton, the Dog Who Saved Hollywood	Special Effects Man	Cameo appearance
1977	Proof of the Man	Capt. O'Brien	
1977	The Private Files of J. Edgar Hoover	J. Edgar Hoover	
1979	A Little Romance	Himself	
1980	Harlequin	Doc Wheelan	
1980	There Goes the Bride	Petrol Attendant	
1981	Liar's Moon	Col. Tubman	
1982	The Uppercrust	Mike Carrady	
1983	The Creature Wasn't Nice	Max the Computer (voice)	Uncredited

=== Television ===
Year	Title	Role(s)	Notes
1952–1953	Lux Video Theatre	David, Socko Renard	2 episodes
1953	Four Star Playhouse	Mike Dundee	Episode: "Knockout"
1953	General Electric Theater	Scott	Episode: "Ride the River"
1953	Ford Theatre	Lt. Mike Fargo	Episode: "Margin for Fear"
1953–1954	Schlitz Playhouse of Stars	Tim, Joe Mitchell	2 episodes
1955	Producers' Showcase	Walter Reed	Episode: "Yellow Jack"
1955	Damon Runyon Theater	Heine Schmitz	Episode: "Dancing Dan's Christmas"
1955–1959	Highway Patrol	Dan Matthews	Main cast
1958	Bat Masterson	Sgt. Foley	Episode: "Two Graves for Swan Valley"
1959	The Rough Riders	William Quantrill	Episode: "The Plot to Assassinate President Johnson"
1961–1962	King of Diamonds	John King	Main cast
1963	Kraft Mystery Theatre	Keyes	Episode: "Shadow of a Man"
1963	The Virginian	George Wolfe	Episode: "A Killer in Town"
1963	Arrest and Trial	Grant Randolph	Episode: "A Flame in the Dark"
1964	Rawhide	Jud Hammerklein	Episode: "Incident at Deadhorse"
1964	Destry	Oakley	Episode: "The Solid Gold Girl"
1964	Burke's Law	Various roles	4 episodes
1964–1966	Bob Hope Presents the Chrysler Theatre	Various roles	3 episodes
1965	The Rogues	Amos Cavanaugh	Episode: "Gambit by the Golden Gate"
1965	Kraft Suspense Theatre	Walter 'Pop' Tullett	Episode: "The Long Ravine"
1967	The Man from U.N.C.L.E.	Mark Tenza	Episode: "The 'J' for Judas Affair"
1967	The Girl from U.N.C.L.E.	Soyil Irosian	Episode: "The Low Blue C Affair"
1967	Cimarron Strip	A-1 Joe Lehigh	Episode: "The Blue Moon Train"
1968–1969	The Name of the Game	Various roles	3 episodes
1969	Ironside	Jack Stuart	Episode: "In Search of an Artist"
1969	Land of the Giants	Prof. Gorn	Episode: "The Mechanical Man"
1969	Get Smart	C. Errol Madre	Episode: "The Treasure of C. Errol Madre"
1969	Love, American Style	Francis Adams	Episode: "Love and the Dating Computer"
1970	Bracken's World	Insp. Ed Harlow	Episode: "A Perfect Piece of Casting"
1970	It Takes a Thief	Harvey Galishaw	Episode: "Fortune City"
1970–1971	The Interns	Dr. Peter Goldstone	Main cast
1971	The Man and the City	Holland Sr.	Episode: "Disaster on Turner Street"
1971	Cade's County	Wes Novak	Episode: "Requiem for a Miss Madrid"
1972	Alias Smith and Jones	Chester E. Powers	Episode: "The Man Who Broke the Bank at Red gap"
1972	Night Gallery	Joseph Fulton	Episode: "You Can't Get Help Like That Anymore"
1972	Banacek	Gilbert Deretzo	Episode: "No Sign of the Cross"
1974	Harry O	John Mackenzie	2 episodes
1975	Medical Story	Joe Hudson	Episode: "The God Syndrome"
1976	City of Angels	Burton Macklin	Episode: "The Losers"
1976	Hunter	Gen. Meeker	Pilot episode
1977	CHiPs	Himself	Episode: "Hustle"
1978	Flying High	Willard	Episode: "South by Southwest"
1981	Vega$	Winslow	Episode: "Dead Ringer"
1981	Fantasy Island	Jake Dutton	Episode: "Lillian Russell/The Lagoon"
1982	Simon & Simon	Kern Barnett	Episode: "Rough Rider Rides Again"

==== TV films and miniseries ====
Year	Title	Role(s)
1970	The Challenge	Gen. Lewis Meyers
1971	A Tattered Web	Willard Edson
1972	The Adventures of Nick Carter	Otis Duncan
1974	The Phantom of Hollywood	Capt. O'Neal
1976	Look What's Happened to Rosemary's Baby	Sheriff Holtzman
1976	Mayday at 40,000 Feet!	Marshal Riese

== Stage appearances (partial) ==
Year	Title	Role	Venue	Ref.
1934	She Loves Me Not	Henry Broughton	Adelphi Theatre, London	
1935	Point Valaine	George Fox	Ethel Barrymore Theatre, New York	
1935	Sweet Mystery of Life	Boop Oglethorpe	Shubert Theatre, New York	
1937–1938	Of Mice and Men	Lennie Small	Music Box Theatre, New York	
1974	That Championship Season	The Coach	Garrick Theatre, London	

== Radio appearances ==
Year	Program	Episode/source	Ref.
1952	Hollywood Star Playhouse	Santa Is No Saint	
1953	Cavalcade of America	Star and Shield	
1954	Suspense	Parole to Panic	

== Awards and nominations ==
Institution	Year	Category	Work	Result	Ref.
Academy Awards	1950	Best Actor	All the King's Men	Won	
Golden Globes	1950	Best Actor in a Motion Picture – Drama	All the King's Men	Won	
New York Film Critics Circle	1949	Best Actor	All the King's Men	Won	
Pula Film Festival	1961	Special Award (Acting)	Square of Violence	Won	
