= Horror Island =

1941 film by George Waggner

- Theatrical film poster
- Directed by: George Waggner
- Screenplay by: Maurice Tombragel; Victor McLeod
- Based on: "Terror of the South Seas" by Alex Gottlieb
- Starring: Dick Foran; Leo Carrillo; Peggy Moran; Fuzzy Knight; Lewis Howard; Walter Catlett
- Cinematography: Elwood Bredell
- Edited by: Otto Ludwig
- Production company: Universal Pictures Company, Inc.
- Distributed by: Universal Pictures Company, Inc.
- Release date: 28 March 1941
- Running time: 60 minutes
- Country: United States
- Language: English
- Budget: $93,000

Horror Island is a 1941 American mystery and horror film directed by George Waggner. It was based on the short story "Terror of the South Seas" by Alex Gottlieb. It stars Dick Foran, Peggy Moran, Leo Carrillo, Eddie Parker, Dale Van Sickle, John Eldredge, Lewis Howard, Hobart Cavanaugh, Iris Adrian and Fuzzy Knight. Foy Van Dolsen plays the monstrous villain "Panama Pete", alias "The Phantom". The plot has assorted colorful characters going to a mysterious island to seek a pirate's hidden fortune.

The film cost $93,000 and was made between filming on March 3, 1941. It was made to be the second half of a double feature with Man-Made Monster. On its release it was considered mediocre by critics, recommending it to juvenile audiences.

== Plot summary ==
Bill Martin, graduate of Princeton University, is the proud owner of a small boulder of an island off the coast of Florida called "Morgan's Island". It is a deserted useless rock to Bill, but by pure chance he stumbles across a treasure map pointing to his island. The map is presented to him by a peg-legged old sailor, Tobias Clump, after Bill and his friend "Stuff" Oliver saves the man from drowning. Clump was pushed into the water by a "phantom", who got away with part of the treasure map. Clump tells them that the map shows the way to infamous buccaneer Sir Henry Morgan's twenty million dollar treasure. Soon after this, Bill's cousin George offers to buy the whole island for the amount of $20,000, but Bill isn't willing to sell. Instead he brings the map to a reputed cartographer named Jasper who claims that the map is fake—it's a very well-made forgery. Letting go of the thought of the legendary treasure, Bill instead thinks of making some money by starting a "treasure hunt" cruise to his island, for fifty dollars apiece. He involves Stuff in the plans and together they start out for the island to plant a fake treasure for the tourists to find. On their way they are involved in a traffic accident, and by "accident" meet the posh Wendy Creighton and her boy toy, Thurman Coldwater. Since Bill is a little short of money he persuades Wendy to take his treasure cruise.

When the ship is ready to leave on the cruise, Bill, Stuff, Wendy and Thurman are accompanied by cousin George, Jasper, a small-time gangster by the name of Rod Grady, his wife Arleen and a private investigator, McGoon, who has tried to find evidence that the cruise is a fake and uses false advertising. Before the ship even leaves the harbor a bomb is secretly delivered. However, someone accidentally drops the bomb over board just before it explodes. The ship sails and is soon lost at sea, until Bill discovers that a magnet has been placed on the compass to deliberately put them off track. It becomes obvious that someone is trying to sabotage the trip to the island. Once the ship is on the right course again it takes only six hours to cover the distance to Morgan's Island. It doesn't take long before bad things start to happen to the group. In the old abandoned castle a cross-bow almost kills Clump and a suit of armor nearly crushes Wendy. Bill mistakes the accidents for Stuff's planned surprises, part of the "haunting" experience included in the treasure hunt.

The phantom that stole part of the treasure map from Clump reappears and warns Wendy and tells her that she will die if she stays on. She doesn't take this seriously, but the phantom appears once more, this time in her bedroom at night, and warns her again. Everyone believes that someone is pretending to be the ghost in an effort to scare them all off. Bill starts looking for the joker, and encounters Jasper as he is sleepwalking in the castle corridors at night. Tobias goes missing and when Rod and Arleen try to escape the castle and leave the island they discover that the boat is gone. A man in a cape kills Rod in front of Arleen, but when she gets back to the rest of the group the private investigator McGoon suspects her of being the killer. Bill suspects Tobias, who is still missing, and a "footprint" from a peg-leg is found near Rod's body. It turns out there is big reward set for the dead gangster, "dead or alive". Tobias reunites with the group and tells of a key he has found. It is supposed to unlock a torture chamber in the castle, where Sir Henry Morgan's treasure is hidden. The group enters the chamber but finds only a single gold coin. As they return to the castle's main hall there is a note on the table saying "nine left". The cross-bow fires again, but misses Clump by an inch, killing the phantom instead. It turns out the phantom was no other than an old shipmate of Clump's. On the phantom's body they find the rest of the treasure map and a fake peg-leg.

Bill, Stuff and Clump go to find the treasure, leaving George and Wendy to themselves in the castle. They find a new note saying "eight left" and when George tries to find the anonymous killer, Wendy is abducted by an unknown person. When the rest of the group is back at the castle they find George murdered inside one of the armor suits. Bill realizes that Jasper must be the killer, but when Bill confronts him with Rod's gun in his hand, it turns out the gun is unloaded and Jasper gets the advantage. Bill, Stuff and Wendy escape, but only to find themselves trapped in a secret passage inside the castle walls. As they get rescued by Clump, it turns out the passage leads directly to Sir Henry Morgan's treasure. Jasper follows and finds them, forcing them on to the treasure chamber. As they open the final passage door an axe falls down to kill Jasper. The rest of the group enter the treasure chamber and opens the chest, only to find the skeleton of Sir Henry Morgan himself. Disappointed the group members make their way back to the surface, where they meet a government agent, who offers to buy the whole island from Bill in order to build a naval base. After all the mysteries are solved, Bill and Wendy become a pair, making Bill worth $7,000,000.

== Cast ==
Cast adapted from the book Universal Horrors:

- Dick Foran as Bill Martin
- Leo Carrillo as Tobias Clump
- Peggy Moran as Wendy Crayton
- Fuzzy Knight as Stuff Oliver
- John Eldredge as George Martin
- Lewis Howard as Thurman Coldwater
- Hobart Cavanaugh as Professor Jasper Quinley
- Walter Catlett as Sergeant McGoon
- Ralf Harolde as Rod Grady
- Iris Adrian as Arleen Grady
- Foy Van Dolsen as Panama Pete/The Phantom
- Emmett Vogan as The Stranger
- Walter Tetley as Delivery Boy

== Production ==
Horror Island was developed to be the accompanying half of a double feature with Man-Made Monster. It was developed under the working title of Terror of the South Seas. An article in the Hollywood Reporter from January 1941 stated that writer Samuel J. Warshawsky was assigned by supervising producer Joseph Santley to work on the screenplay for this film, but its undetermined if either man contributed to the released film. It was made on a budget of $93,000. Filming began on March 3 and ended in the middle of March.

== Release ==
Horror Island was released by Universal Pictures Company, Inc. on March 28, 1941. It was released on DVD as part of a "Universal Horror: Classic Movie Archive" DVD set on September 13, 2009. The release includes The Black Cat, Man-Made Monster, Night Monster and Captive Wild Woman. It received a blu-ray release from Shout! Factory as part of their Universal Horror Collection Vol. 3 on December 17, 2019. This release includes Tower of London, Man-Made Monster and The Black Cat.

== Reception ==
The authors of Universal Horrors reflected on the contemporary reception of the film, noting that "many of the daily news critics and trade reviewers shrugged Horror Island off as a mere trifle, no more, no less; any criticism that it yielded stronger than this was just plain overkill". Archer Winsten of The New York Post declared the film "a nicely paced quickie" whose problem was "that it tries so hard to be scary, funny, and mysterious that the component parts never come together". Theodore Strauss echoed this statement, noting that "it's not much fun nor very frightening, but it's innocent and any one can play". Both Strauss and an anonymous reviewer in Harrison's Reports noted it would play well with children. Kate Cameron of The New York Daily News declared that the film was "replete with all the claptrap of the mystery film [...] Pretty Peggy Moran plays Wendy nicely and Dick Foran is the gullible Bill Martin to the life".

From retrospective reviews, Hal Erickson of AllMovie commented that Horror Island "remains an enjoyable outing from fade-in to fade-out", noting that "the identity of the "mystery" killer is fairly obvious from the outset, though the screenplay cheats a bit by rendering the villain helpless during one of the murders".
