= Gangster's Boy =

1938 film by William Nigh

- Directed by: William Nigh
- Written by: Robert Hardy Andrews; Karl Brown
- Produced by: Scott R. Dunlap (executive producer); William T. Lackey (associate producer)
- Starring: See below
- Cinematography: Harry Neumann
- Edited by: Russell F. Schoengarth
- Music by: Edward J. Kay
- Production company: Monogram Pictures
- Distributed by: Monogram Pictures
- Release date: November 16, 1938
- Running time: 80 minutes
- Country: United States
- Language: English

Gangster's Boy is a 1938 American drama film directed by William Nigh. It stars Jackie Cooper in his second film for Monogram Pictures. The film was positively received, and has been released on DVD.

== Plot ==
High school student Larry Kelly's father Tim used to be a gangster. Despite being treated badly by his friends, Kelly takes sides with his father when people try to force him to leave the town. Kelly's girlfriend and her brother Bill Davis continue to be around Kelly even though it makes their fathers unhappy. After a car accident in which Bill was the driver, Kelly takes the blame for the accident and is taken to jail for drunk driving. Judge Davis and Kelly's father are opponents on proving Larry Kelly as guilty or innocent.

== Cast ==
- Jackie Cooper as Larry Kelly
- Robert Warwick as Tim 'Knuckles' Kelly
- Lucy Gilman as Julie Davis
- Louise Lorimer as Molly Kelly
- Tommy Wonder as Bill Davis
- Selmer Jackson as Judge Roger Davis
- Betty Blythe as Mrs. Davis
- Huntley Gordon as Principal Benson
- Herbert Evans as Stevens (butler)
- William Gould as Dist. Atty. Edward Jameson
- Jack Kennedy as Sergeant
- Bobby Stone as Salvatore

== Production ==
Jackie Cooper was a child actor for Metro-Goldwyn-Mayer until the company fired him when he was 13 years old, which was a tradition when child actors became teenagers. The smaller company Monogram Pictures hired Cooper after he turned 13 years old to star in the film Boy of the Streets. After a successful stint in films that were produced by other companies, Cooper starred in the Monogram Pictures film Gangster's Boy as part of his contract. The film was produced with a low budget. Betty Blythe, an actress in silent films, was considered to be "more or less retired" by the Harrisburg Telegraph when she took a role in the film despite taking roles that she liked. The Scrantonian Tribune wrote that Robert Warwick had "the finest opportunity of his entire career as Tim Kelly". The film featured music by Hal Le Roy in a revue. Lucy Gilman Scott, a teenage actress for the radio, had her film debut in the film as the girlfriend of Cooper's character. As it turned out, Blythe was not retired and her career continued until 1960.

== Release ==
The film was released by Monogram Pictures on November 16, 1938. It was first released on DVD by Platinum Disc as part of three different 2005 Mobster Movies sets. Direct Source released the film in its 2007 Bootleggers, Delinquents & Gangsters DVD set. Alpha Video released the film on DVD by itself in 2011. It is also available on Amazon Prime Video.

== Reception ==
Karl Krug of the Pittsburgh Sun-Telegraph said, "Gangster's Boy is a neat and comfortable "homey" picture, despite its titles. And, its principal lesson, if any, is that the sins of gangster fathers, although they have reformed, shouldn't be visited upon by their children". The Daily Times-News said that "the dramatic situations in Gangster's Boy are tense and go to make a fine afternoon or evening's entertainment".
