= The Treasure of Lost Canyon =

1952 film by Ted Tetzlaff

- Theatrical release poster
- Directed by: Ted Tetzlaff
- Screenplay by: Brainerd Duffield; Emerson Crocker
- Based on: Robert Louis Stevenson
- Produced by: William Alland
- Starring: William Powell; Julia Adams; Charles Drake; Rosemary DeCamp
- Cinematography: Russell Metty
- Edited by: Milton Carruth
- Production company: Universal Pictures
- Distributed by: Universal Pictures
- Release date: March 1, 1952
- Running time: 82 minutes
- Country: United States
- Language: English

The Treasure of Lost Canyon is a 1952 American Technicolor adventure Western film directed by Ted Tetzlaff and starring William Powell, Julia Adams, Charles Drake, Tommy Ivo and Rosemary DeCamp. It was based on Robert Louis Stevenson's short story The Treasure of Franchard.

== Cast ==
- William Powell as Homer 'Doc' Brown
- Julia Adams as Myra Wade
- Charles Drake as Jim Anderson
- Rosemary DeCamp as Samuella
- Tommy Ivo as David
- Henry Hull as Cousin Lucius Cooke
- Chubby Johnson as Baltimore Dan
- John Doucette as Gyppo
- Marvin Press as Paddy
- Griff Barnett Judge Wade

== Bibliography ==
- Bryant, Roger. William Powell: The Life and Films. McFarland, 2006.
