= Always Goodbye (1938 film) =

1938 film by Sidney Lanfield

- Theatrical release poster
- Directed by: Sidney Lanfield
- Screenplay by: Kathryn Scola; Edith Skouras
- Story by: Gilbert Emery; Douglas Doty
- Produced by: Raymond Griffith (associate producer)
- Starring: Barbara Stanwyck; Herbert Marshall; Ian Hunter; Cesar Romero; Lynn Bari; Binnie Barnes; John Russell
- Cinematography: Robert Planck
- Edited by: Robert Simpson
- Music by: Louis Silvers (musical direction)
- Production company: Twentieth Century-Fox Film Corporation
- Distributed by: 20th Century Fox
- Release date: July 1, 1938 (USA)
- Running time: 75 minutes
- Country: United States
- Language: English

Always Goodbye is a 1938 American romantic drama film directed by Sidney Lanfield and starring Barbara Stanwyck, Herbert Marshall, and Ian Hunter.

== Plot ==
Following the death of her fiancé as he was speeding to their wedding, Margot Weston is left pregnant and devastated. A former doctor, Jim Howard, helps the desperate Margot. When her son is born, Jim helps her find a home for the baby with Phil Marshall and his wife. Margot insists that neither the Marshalls nor the child can ever know that she is his mother.

Five years later, while working as a well-paid buyer for couturier Harriet Martin, Margot meets Jim Howard again, and the two begin to fall in love. When Margot is sent to Europe on a business trip for Harriet, she meets and is wooed by the charming and carefree Count Giovanni Corini. While in Paris, she happens to meet her son, Roddy, who is traveling with his aunt who has been taking care of him since his adoptive mother died.

On the trip back to America, Margot and Roddy become close. Giovanni is also on the same ship, and he continues to pursue Margot. Back home, Margot becomes convinced that Jessica Reid, Phil's new fiancée, does not love him, and would be a bad mother to Roddy. Margot decides to break up the engagement, though Jim, beginning a career as a scientist, reminds her of her earlier promise not to interfere in the boy's life.

Phil overhears a conversation between Margot and Jessica which brings their engagement to an end. Meanwhile, Jim tries to ask Margot to marry him, but then Phil asks Margot to marry him for his and Roddy's sake. Though Margot admits she loves Jim, he steps aside so that she can have a life with Roddy and Phil.

== Cast ==
- Barbara Stanwyck as Margot Weston
- Herbert Marshall as Jim Howard
- Ian Hunter as Phillip Marshall
- Cesar Romero as Count Giovanni Corini
- Lynn Bari as Jessica Reid
- Binnie Barnes as Harriet Martin
- John Russell as Roddy
- Mary Forbes as Martha Marshall
- Albert Conti as Benoit
- Marcelle Corday as Nurse
- Franklyn Pangborn as Bicycle Salesman
- George Davis as French Cabbie (uncredited)
- Ben Welden as Taxi Driver
- Eddy Conrad as Barber

Uncredited (in order of appearance)
Mary Treen	Woman waiting for her fiancé Al outside marriage license bureau
Hal K. Dawson	Al who arrives late because he had to wait to get his paycheck
Robert Lowery	Don Gordon, Margot's fiancé
Pat O'Malley	Police officer at scene of Don's crash
Kay Griffith	Nurse in hospital who asks Margot if she is a relative of Don
Charles Tannen	Hospital intern who tells the nurse, "body to be held until claimed by family"
Dorris Bowdon	Nurse at maternity hospital who says, "Mr. and Mrs. Phillip Marshall are here"
Rita Gould	Mrs. Wyndham, customer at Harriet Martin's fashion salon
Jayne Regan	Customer at Harriet Martin's
Cyril Ring	Man to whom she says, "What do you think, dear?"
Joan Castle	Model at Harriet Martin's
Charles Coleman	Headwaiter at restaurant where Margot and Jim go to dine
Iva Stewart	Flower dress model at Paris fashion salon
Edwin Stanley	Decorator at Paris fashion salon where Margot selects designs
Carol Adams	Paris Ritz hatcheck girl who takes Count Corini's hat
Rafael Storm	Paris Ritz orchestra leader
Eugene Borden	Purser on SS Normandie who converses with Margot and Roddy
Frank O'Connor	Customs inspector in New York upon arrival of SS Normandie
Harold Goodwin	Phillip Marshall's chauffeur
Al Hill	Taxi driver who says "OK" when Margot suggests to Jim to drive around
Rafael Alcayde	Orchestra leader at Delta where Margot and Jim go to dance
