= Man on a Bus =

- Directed by: Joseph H. Lewis
- Written by: Stephen Longstreet
- Produced by: Charles Levin
- Starring: Broderick Crawford
- Cinematography: Harold Marzoratti
- Edited by: Frank Santillo
- Release date: 15 May 1955 (US TV)
- Running time: 28 mins
- Country: USA
- Language: English

Man on a Bus is a 1955 American film about settlers in Israel.

== Plot summary ==
Six people who have emigrated to Israel catch a bus through the Negev Desert. The bus breaks down.

== Cast ==
- Walter Brennan as Saul
- Broderick Crawford as Nahum, bus driver
- Rosemary DeCamp as Miriam
- J. Carrol Naish as Mr. Stein
- Ruth Roman as Rachel
- Kim Charney as Tobias
- Peter Leeds as Enoch
