= Men on Call =

1931 film

- Directed by: John G. Blystone
- Screenplay by: James Kevin McGuinness; Basil Woon
- Story by: James Kevin McGuinness
- Starring: Edmund Lowe; Mae Clarke; William Harrigan; Sharon Lynn; Warren Hymer; Ruth Warren
- Cinematography: Charles G. Clarke; Glen MacWilliams
- Edited by: Paul Weatherwax
- Production company: Fox Film Corporation
- Distributed by: Fox Film Corporation
- Release date: January 18, 1931
- Running time: 70 minutes
- Country: United States
- Language: English

Men on Call is a 1931 American pre-Code drama film directed by John G. Blystone and written by James Kevin McGuinness and Basil Woon. The picture stars Edmund Lowe, Mae Clarke, William Harrigan, Sharon Lynn, Warren Hymer and Ruth Warren. The film was released on January 18, 1931, by Fox Film Corporation.

== Plot ==
Railroad engineer Chuck Long happily tells his friends that he is marrying dancer Helen Gordon the next day, then goes to the theater where Helen works. He arrives while Helen's fellow performers are throwing a party for her, but their merriment is interrupted when a reporter arrives and reveals that Helen, whose real name is Helen Harding, was named as a co-respondent in a scandalous divorce trial six months earlier. Chuck assumes the worst and rushes from the theater without letting Helen explain. She follows him, but by the time she arrives at the railroad yard, Chuck has taken another engine out and left. Thoughts of Helen distract Chuck from his job and he wrecks the train. After he is released from the hospital, Chuck wanders from one job to the next until six months later, he has become a hobo. Cap, a kindhearted Coast Guard captain, meets Chuck in a park, and after Chuck explains that he was reared as a sailor, Cap convinces him to join the Coast Guard to help him forget his bitterness. Over the next three years, Chuck and Cap become fast friends, and Chuck settles into his new life. Chuck periodically receives letters from Helen but destroys them without reading them. One day, Chuck and Cap are crossing the bay when they find a woman in the water. They rescue her from drowning, and Chuck discovers to his horror that she is Helen, although he does not reveal this to Cap. Cap takes her to his cottage, where he looks after her as she regains her strength. A week passes as Helen tries to talk to Chuck, who keeps brushing her off. Crushed by Chuck's continual rejection, Helen decides to leave, but agrees to stay when Cap, who is falling in love with her, pleads with her to attend a special annual Coast Guard dance. Angered by Helen's decision, Chuck threatens to reveal her past to Cap if she does not leave. At the dance, Cap proposes to Helen, but their conversation is interrupted by Chuck, who tells Cap that Helen is the girl who 'cracked him up.' Demanding that Chuck finally hear her out, Helen explains that she was entirely guiltless in the divorce trial, but changed her name to escape the constant prying of tabloid reporters. She further explains that it is not easy for women to get by honestly in life because of men's demands, and that she had thrown herself in the water rather than accept a proposition that 'would have made life easy.' She bitterly tells Chuck that from then on, she will fulfill the label he has put on her. After she runs away, Cap punches Chuck for being a heel. Soon after, Cap, Chuck and the men answer an alarm summoning them to a burning freighter. Cap is trapped in the hold when he tries to rescue the freighter's captain, and Chuck courageously rescues them both. In the hospital, Cap and Chuck convalesce and patch up their friendship. When Helen, disguised in a borrowed nurse's uniform, sneaks into their room, Chuck pretends not to recognize her and continues telling Cap that he realizes what a sap he was and will never let Helen go again. Helen accepts Chuck's proposal, and as the reunited couple kiss, Cap cheerfully states that he will be Chuck's best man at the wedding.

== Cast ==
- Edmund Lowe as Chuck Long
- Mae Clarke as Helen Gordon / Helen Harding
- William Harrigan as Cap
- Sharon Lynn as Mary Burton
- Warren Hymer as Joe Burke
- Ruth Warren as Mrs. Burke
