= Mr. Lemon of Orange =

1931 American comedy film

- Directed by: John G. Blystone
- Written by: Jack Hays; Eddie Cantor; Edwin J. Burke
- Produced by: William Fox
- Starring: El Brendel; Fifi D'Orsay; Ruth Warren
- Cinematography: Joseph H. August
- Edited by: Ralph Dixon
- Music by: Peter Brunelli
- Production company: Fox Film Corporation
- Distributed by: Fox Film Corporation
- Release date: March 22, 1931
- Running time: 70 minutes
- Country: United States
- Language: English

Mr. Lemon of Orange is a 1931 American Pre-Code comedy film directed by John G. Blystone and starring El Brendel, Fifi D'Orsay and Ruth Warren. It was produced and distributed by the Fox Film Corporation.

== Plot ==
Silent McGee is a tough gangster, and Mr. Oscar Lemon is a mild-mannered Swede who coincidentally looks exactly like the gangster McGee. Silent McGee disguises himself as a Swedish immigrant while running from the law, causing Mr. Lemon to be mistaken for the wanted man. Julie LaRue is a comedic vamp who pursues the comparatively innocent Mr. Lemon.

== Cast ==
- El Brendel as Mr. Lemon/Silent McGee
- Fifi D'Orsay as Julie LaRue
- William Collier Sr. as Mr. Blake
- Ruth Warren as Mrs. Blake
- Nat Pendleton as Gangster
- Joan Castle as June Blake
- Don Dillaway as Jerry
- Eddie Gribbon as Walter
- Erville Alderson as Mr. Brown
- Jack Rutherford as Castro
- Dixie Lee as Hat Check Girl
- William H. O'Brien as Waiter
- George Magrill as Henchman

== Reception ==
The New York Times' Mordaunt Hall, wrote at the time, "Mr. Brendel is mildly funny in some of the scenes, but a little of this Swedish-accented comedian goes a long way. Miss Dorsay gives a lively performance and during the proceedings she hazards a song titled 'My Racket Is You.' Mr. Collier is worthy of better lines than are given to him in this film."

== Notes ==
- Anthony Slide, Eccentrics of Comedy (1998)
