= Basil Woon =

British playwright (1893–1974)

Basil Dillon Woon (28 September 1893, London – 4 June 1974 Reno) was a British playwright, American author, and American journalist. He covered the Mexican Revolution for United Press, and also worked for the New York World, The Houston Press, the San Francisco News, and the British Broadcasting Corporation.

== Filmography ==
His writings were used in several films from the 1920s through the 1940s. His play Misdeal was adapted into the film Recaptured Love in 1930, and he was credited as a writer for the 1933 film Pilgrimage.

- The Painted Lady (1925) (story) ... a.k.a. Red Lips (UK)
- Recaptured Love (1930) (play "Misdeal")
- Men on Call (1931) (writer)
- While Paris Sleeps (1932) (writer) (20th Century Fox)
- Pilgrimage (1933) (uncredited)
- The Perfect Crime (1937) (writer)
- Simply Terrific (1938) (story)
- Two for Danger (1940) (writer)
- Freedom Radio (1941) (screenplay and dialogue) ... a.k.a. A Voice in the Night (USA)
- This Was Paris (1942) (story) ... a.k.a. So This Was Paris
- Rhythm Serenade (1943) (screenplay)
- Flight from Folly (1945) (writer)
- Gaiety George (1946) (dialogue) ... aka Showtime (USA)

== Death ==
Woon died in Reno, Nevada, 4 June 1974.
