= Covered Wagon Days =

1940 film

- Film poster
- Directed by: George Sherman
- Written by: William Colt MacDonald; Earle Snell
- Produced by: Harry Grey
- Starring: Robert Livingston; Raymond Hatton; Duncan Renaldo
- Cinematography: William Nobbles
- Edited by: Bernard Loftus
- Distributed by: Republic Pictures
- Release date: April 22, 1940
- Running time: 56 minutes
- Country: United States
- Language: English

Covered Wagon Days is a 1940 American Western "Three Mesquiteers" B-movie directed by George Sherman.

== Cast ==
- Robert Livingston as Stony Brooke
- Raymond Hatton as Rusty Joslin
- Duncan Renaldo as Rico Rinaldo
- Kay Griffith as Maria
- George Douglas as Ransome
- Ruth Robinson as Mama Rinaldo
- Paul Marion as Carlos Rinaldo
- John Merton as Henchman
- Tom Chatterton as Maj. J.A. Norton
- Guy D'Ennery as Don Diego
- Tom London as Martin
- Reed Howes as Henchman
