= Joan Castle =

American actress (1914–2009)

- Born: February 26, 1914; Chicago, Illinois, U.S.
- Died: December 2, 2009 (aged 95); New York City, U.S.
- Other names: Yvonne Duval
- Occupation: Actress
- Spouse(s): William Post Jr. (1941–1944); William Sitwell (¿?)

Joan Castle (February 26, 1914 – December 2, 2009) was an American actress in films, TV series and theatrical productions. She also used the name Yvonne Duval as an actress.

== Early life ==
Castle was born in Chicago to French parents. After studying ballet, she danced professionally.

== Career ==
Castle started her career as a child in the 1920s.

Using the name Yvonne Duval, she was under contract with Paramount for two years, but she said, "it didn't get me anywhere." After she signed with NBC Artists Bureau, she changed her name to Joan Castle.

After a short stay in Hollywood during the 1930s, she returned to the stage. She auditioned for the science-fiction musical Just Imagine, but the part was eventually given to Maureen O'Sullivan. Eventually Castle became a contract player for Fox Films. She appeared in the films Young Sinners, Hush Money and Mr. Lemon of Orange during the early 1930s. Her big break came with the Broadway comedy Sailor Beware. She substituted for Audrey Christie, who became ill. She played the part of Christie and established herself as a qualified actress. When the contract of Christie expired, she assumed the role until the closure of the show. She also toured in a touring company, appearing opposite José Ferrer in The Play's the Thing. During World War II she toured for eight months in the USO show Nothing But The Truth, travelling throughout South America, Africa, and Egypt. She had minor parts in Twentieth Century-Fox films during the late 1930s. Her most important role was playing Vera Grant opposite Allan Jones in the Universal film Sing a Jingle. She also replaced Effie Afton in the comic part Violet Shelton in My Sister Eileen opposite Shirley Booth.

== Personal life ==
On September 11, 1941, Castle married actor William Post Jr.; they were divorced in 1944. She later married William Sitwell.

== Filmography ==
=== Film ===
- Mr. Lemon of Orange (1931) – June Blake (uncredited)
- Young Sinners (1931) – Sue
- Hush Money (1931) – Miss Stockton (uncredited)
- Here, Prince (1932) – Hazel Pepper (uncredited)
- False Impressions (1932) – Minor Role (uncredited)
- I Know Everybody and Everybody's Racket (1933) – Lancaster Lil (uncredited)
- Wrongorilla (1933) – Mary Bray
- Gold Bricks (1936) – Florence Hazbrook
- Change of Heart (1938) – Secretary
- Kentucky Moonshine (1938) – Telephone Operator
- Always Goodbye (1938) – Minor Role (uncredited)
- Gateway (1938) – Sob Sister (uncredited)
- Sing a Jingle (1944) – Vera Grant

=== Television ===
- The Philco Television Playhouse – The Beautiful Bequest (1949) TV Episode
- Colgate Theatre – Abby, Her Farm (1950) TV Episode
- Girl Talk – (1966) TV Episode – self
