= Sound Off (film) =

1952 film by Richard Quine

- Original film poster
- Directed by: Richard Quine
- Written by: Blake Edwards; Richard Quine
- Produced by: Jonie Taps
- Starring: Mickey Rooney; Anne James; Sammy White; John Archer
- Cinematography: Ellis W. Carter
- Edited by: Charles Nelson
- Music by: Morris Stoloff
- Production company: Columbia Pictures
- Distributed by: Columbia Pictures
- Release dates: May 1952 (Los Angeles); July 3, 1952 (United States)
- Running time: 83 minutes
- Country: United States
- Language: English

Sound Off is a 1952 American comedy film directed by Richard Quine and starring Mickey Rooney, Anne James, John Archer and Gordon Jones. The film was shot in August 1951 in SuperCinecolor for Columbia Pictures.

This was the first of a three-picture contract between Rooney and producer Jonie Taps for Columbia, in which Rooney was paid $75,000 for each picture. It is also the first collaboration between Richard Quine, Blake Edwards and Dick Crockett. The same team next collaborated with Rooney in the Navy film All Ashore made the following year. The three worked together again on Rooney's television series The Mickey Rooney Show/Hey Mulligan in 1954–55. Their final film in the Columbia contract was the black and white crime drama Drive a Crooked Road.

The film's title comes from the military cadence by Willie Lee Duckworth that was a major 1951 chart hit for Vaughn Monroe.

== Plot ==
Obnoxious nightclub comedian at Ciro's Mike Donnelly is drafted into the U.S. Army during the Korean War. At his arrival at basic training, he meets WAC Lieutenant Colleen Rafferty and romantically pursues her. His activities irritate his drill sergeant Major Crockett and the entire army when he goes AWOL (Absent Without Official Leave) for her. He is imprisoned and sentenced to thirty days hard labor that turns him into a soldier. Then, he is shipped overseas to join the Special Services.

== Cast ==
- Mickey Rooney as Mike Donnelly
- Anne James as Lt. Colleen Rafferty
- John Archer as Maj. Paul Whiteside
- Gordon Jones as Sgt. Crockett
- Sammy White as Joey Kirby
- Wally Cassell as Tony Baccigalupi
- Paul Bryar as George
- Helen Ford as Mrs. Rafferty
- Mary Lou Geer as Evelyn Ames
- Marshall Reed as Capt. Fred Karger
- Arthur Space as Barney Fisher
- Sue Casey as Showgirl
- Rosalee Calvert as Showgirl
- Joanne Jordan as Showgirl
- Joan Shawlee as Showgirl
- Diana Mumby as Showgirl
- Emil Sitka as Waiter
- Tony Taylor as Billy
- Ruth Warren as Billy's Mother
- Boyd "Red" Morgan as Red
- Harry Lauter as Laughing Corporal
