= King of the Cowboys =

1943 film by Joseph Kane

- Directed by: Joseph Kane
- Written by: Olive Cooper; J. Benton Cheney; Hal Long
- Starring: Roy Rogers; Smiley Burnette; Peggy Moran; Gerald Mohr
- Distributed by: Republic Pictures
- Release date: April 9, 1943
- Running time: 67 minutes 73 minutes (Original Version)
- Country: United States
- Language: English

King of the Cowboys is a 1943 film directed by Joseph Kane, starring Roy Rogers and Smiley Burnette. It is set in Texas during World War II. Life Magazine published an article on their July 12, 1943, by H. Allen Smith about Roy Rogers, calling him the "King of the Cowboys-Roy Rogers Kisses the Horse, Not the Heroine".

== Premise ==
Starring in a rodeo, Roy Rogers is secretly summoned by the Governor of Texas who asks Roy to volunteer to track down a sabotage ring. Roy discovers they are members of a travelling show with which Roy and Smiley join.

== Cast ==
- Roy Rogers as Roy Rogers
- Smiley Burnette as Frog Millhouse
- Bob Nolan as Singer
- Sons of the Pioneers as Themselves
- Peggy Moran as Judy Mason
- Gerald Mohr as Maurice, the Mental Marvel
- Dorothea Kent as Ruby Smith
- Lloyd Corrigan as William Kraley, Governor's Secretary
- James Bush as Dave Mason
- Russell Hicks as Texas Governor Shuville
- Irving Bacon as Alf Cluckus
- Norman Willis as Henchman Buxton
- Forrest Taylor as Lawman with Tex
