= Peggy Moran =

American actress (1918–2002)

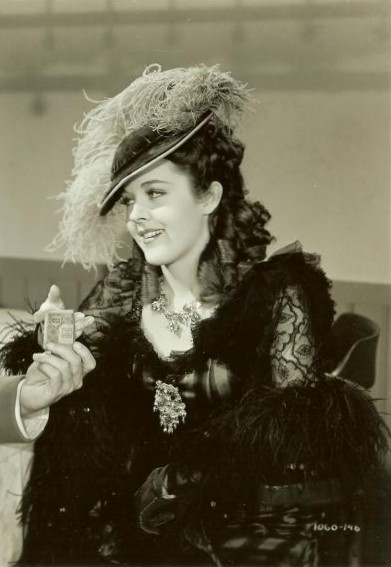
- Moran in Spring Parade (1940)
- Born: Mary Jeanette Moran; October 23, 1918; Clinton, Iowa, U.S.
- Died: October 24, 2002 (aged 84); Camarillo, California, U.S.
- Occupation: Actress
- Years active: 1938–1943
- Spouse: Henry Koster (m. 1942; died 1988)
- Children: 2
- Father: Earl Moran

Peggy Moran (born Mary Jeanette Moran, October 23, 1918 – October 24, 2002) was an American film actress who appeared in films between 1938 and 1943.

== Early years ==
Born Marie Jeanette Moran on October 23, 1918, in Clinton, Iowa, Moran was the daughter of Earl Moran, an artist specializing in pin-ups for calendars and magazines, and dancer Louise Scott, formerly a member of the Denishawn Dance Company.

Moran's family moved to Hollywood when she was 5. She attended the Micheltorina School and John Marshall High School, graduating in 1937.

== Career ==
Moran's film career began at Warner Bros. in the late 1930s. She starred in a number of B movies, including The Mummy's Hand (1940), Slightly Tempted (1940), Horror Island (1941), Treat 'Em Rough (1942), and King of the Cowboys (1943), and played smaller parts in A pictures, such as the "first cigarette girl" in Ninotchka (1939). After marrying director Henry Koster on October 29, 1942, a bust of Moran was featured in every picture her husband directed. After her marriage, Moran retired from acting and appeared in only one other film: a documentary made in 2000. The existing bust did not fit the period of one film, so Koster had a new bust made at a cost of $4000. Films also used "silhouettes, cameos, paintings, and even photographs" of Moran.

== Personal life ==
Koster and Moran had two sons. After Koster retired in 1966, the couple traveled extensively until his death in 1988.

== Death ==
On October 24, 2002, only one day after her 84th birthday, Moran died of complications from injuries she had suffered in a car accident on August 26, 2002. She was cremated and her ashes were scattered at sea.

== Filmography ==
Year	Title	Role	Notes
1938	Gold Diggers in Paris	Golddigger	Alternative title: The Gay Impostors
1938	Boy Meets Girl	New York Operator	Uncredited
1938	Secrets of an Actress	Actress	Uncredited
1938	Campus Cinderella	Co-Ed	Uncredited
1938	Girls' School	Myra	
1938	The Sisters	Girl	Uncredited
1939	Rhythm of the Saddle	Maurine McClune	
1939	King of the Underworld	Young Man's Wife	Scenes deleted
1939	Zenobia	Party Guest	Uncredited; Alternative title: Elephants Never Forget
1939	Winter Carnival	Viola	
1939	Ninotchka	First Cigarette Girl	Uncredited
1939	Little Accident	Tall Girl	Uncredited
1939	First Love	Girl at School	Uncredited
1939	The Big Guy	Joan Lawson	Alternative title: Warden of the Big House
1940	West of Carson City	Millie Harkins	
1940	Oh Johnny, How You Can Love	Kelly Archer	
1940	Danger on Wheels	Pat O'Shea	
1940	Alias the Deacon	Phyllis	Alternative title: The Hillbilly Deacon
1940	Hot Steel	Babe Morrison	
1940	I Can't Give You Anything but Love, Baby	Linda Carroll	
1940	Argentine Nights	Peggy	
1940	The Mummy's Hand	Marta Solvani	
1940	Spring Parade	Irene	
1940	Slightly Tempted	Judy Ross	
1940	One Night in the Tropics	Mickey Fitzgerald	
1940	Trail of the Vigilantes	Barbara Thornton	
1941	Double Date	Penny Kirkland	
1941	Horror Island	Wendy Creighton	
1941	Hello, Sucker	Rosalie Watson	
1941	Flying Cadets	Kitty Randall	
1942	Treat 'Em Rough	Betty Newman	
1942	There's One Born Every Minute	Helen Barbara Twine	
1942	Drums of the Congo	Enid Waldron	
1942	The Mummy's Tomb	Marta Solvani Banning	Uncredited
1942	Seven Sweethearts	Albert "Al" Van Maaster	Alternative title: Tulip Time
1943	King of the Cowboys	Judy Mason	
