= Alias the Deacon (1940 film) =

1940 comedy film

- Theatrical release poster
- Directed by: Christy Cabanne
- Screenplay by: Nat Perrin; Charles Grayson
- Based on: The Deacon by: John B. Hymer; LeRoy Clemens
- Produced by: Ben Pivar
- Starring: Bob Burns; Mischa Auer; Peggy Moran; Dennis O'Keefe; Edward Brophy; Thurston Hall; Spencer Charters; Jack Carson; Guinn "Big Boy" Williams
- Cinematography: Stanley Cortez
- Edited by: Milton Carruth
- Production company: Universal Pictures
- Distributed by: Universal Pictures
- Release date: May 17, 1940
- Running time: 74 minutes
- Country: United States
- Language: English

Alias the Deacon is a 1940 American comedy film directed by Christy Cabanne and written by Nat Perrin and Charles Grayson. It is based on the 1925 play The Deacon by John B. Hymer and LeRoy Clemens. The film stars Bob Burns, Mischa Auer, Peggy Moran, Dennis O'Keefe, Edward Brophy, Thurston Hall, Spencer Charters, Jack Carson and Guinn "Big Boy" Williams. The film was released on May 17, 1940, by Universal Pictures.

== Cast ==
- Bob Burns as Deke Caswell
- Mischa Auer as Andre
- Peggy Moran as Phyllis
- Dennis O'Keefe as Johnny Sloan
- Edward Brophy as Stuffy
- Thurston Hall as Jim Cunningham
- Spencer Charters as Sheriff Yates
- Jack Carson as Sullivan
- Guinn "Big Boy" Williams as Bull Gumbatz
- Virginia Brissac as Elsie Clark
- Benny Bartlett as Willie Clark
- Mira McKinney as Mrs. Gregory
- Janet Shaw as Mildred Gregory

== Reception ==
In a contemporary review for The New York Times, critic Bosley Crowther called the film "an hour of pleasing sport" and wrote: "Let's be grateful for small favors these days and speak a frankly encouraging word for 'Alias the Deacon,' an undistinguished but thoroughly genial little farce-comedy ... In fact, this corner would be glad to recommend it for nothing more than the fun of hearing (and seeing) Mr. Burns inquire sweetly of an unsuspicious schemer out to fleece him, 'Draw poker—what's that?'"
