= Exile Express =

1939 film by Otis Garrett

- Film poster
- Directed by: Otis Garrett
- Written by: Ethel La Blanche (writer); Edwin Justus Mayer (writer)
- Produced by: Eugene Frenke (producer)
- Starring: Anna Sten; Alan Marshal; Jerome Cowan; Walter Catlett
- Cinematography: John J. Mescall
- Edited by: Edward Curtiss; Robert Bischoff
- Music by: George Parrish
- Production company: Grand National Pictures
- Distributed by: Grand National Pictures
- Release date: May 27, 1939
- Running time: 71 minutes
- Country: United States
- Language: English

Exile Express is a 1939 American drama film directed by Otis Garrett and starring Anna Sten, Alan Marshal and Jerome Cowan.

== Plot ==
After being wrongly implicated in the murder of her scientist boss by foreign agents, a young immigrant woman is placed on board an "exile express" from California to New York City where she is to be deported after her arrival at Ellis Island. With the help of a journalist who has fallen in love with her, she jumps off the train and sets out to prove her innocence.

== Cast ==
- Anna Sten as Nadine Nikolas
- Alan Marshal as Steve Reynolds
- Jerome Cowan as Paul Brandt
- Walter Catlett as Gus
- Jed Prouty as Hanley
- Stanley Fields as Tony Kassan
- Leonid Kinskey as David
- Etienne Girardot as Caretaker
- Irving Pichel as Victor
- Harry Davenport as Dr. Hite
- Addison Richards as Purnell
- Feodor Chaliapin Jr. as Kaishevshy
- Spencer Charters as Justice of the Peace Henry P. Smith
- Byron Foulger as Serge
- Don Brodie as Mullins
- Henry Roquemore as Constable
- Vince Barnett as Deputy Constable
- Maude Eburne as Mrs. Smith

== Production ==
It was the first film Sten had made in the United States since leaving her contract with Samuel Goldwyn after The Wedding Night (1935). Since then Sten had appeared in a single film A Woman Alone (1936) in Britain. Exile Express was made by the small Grand National Pictures, which went out of business the same year after producing several large-budgeted films which didn't recoup their costs.
