= Michele Bennett =

Michele Bennett or Michèle Bennett may refer to:

- Michèle Bennett (born 15 January 1950), former First Lady of Haiti.
- Michele Bennett (film producer), Australian film producer.

== Fictional characters ==
- Michele Bennett, a character played by Anna Sten in the 1948 film Let's Live a Little.
