= We Live Again =

1934 film by Rouben Mamoulian

- Italian film poster
- Directed by: Rouben Mamoulian
- Written by: Adaptation: Leonard Praskins; Preston Sturges; Screenplay: Maxwell Anderson; Uncredited: Paul Green; Talbot Jennings; Willard Mack; Edgar G. Ulmer; Thornton Wilder
- Based on: Resurrection by Leo Tolstoy
- Produced by: Samuel Goldwyn
- Starring: Anna Sten; Fredric March
- Cinematography: Gregg Toland
- Edited by: Otho Lovering
- Music by: Alfred Newman
- Production company: Samuel Goldwyn Productions
- Distributed by: United Artists
- Release date: November 1, 1934
- Running time: 85 minutes
- Country: United States
- Language: English

We Live Again is a 1934 American film directed by Rouben Mamoulian and starring Anna Sten and Fredric March. The film is an adaptation of Leo Tolstoy's 1899 novel Resurrection (Voskraeseniye). The screenplay was written by Maxwell Anderson with contributions from a number of writers, including Preston Sturges and Thornton Wilder.

Producer Samuel Goldwyn made the film to showcase Ukrainian actress Anna Sten, his newest discovery. It was Goldwyn who named the film "We Live Again", on the theory that it meant the same thing as "Resurrection" and was easier to understand. The first film adaptation of the Tolstoy novel was made in 1909 by D. W. Griffith, and ran 10 minutes. Numerous other film versions have been made since then.

== Plot ==
Russian Prince Dmitri Nekhlyudov seduces innocent young Katusha Maslova, a servant to his aunts. After they spend the night together in the greenhouse, Dmitri leaves the next morning, outraging Katusha by not leaving a note for her, only money. When she becomes pregnant, she is fired, and when the baby is born, it dies and is buried unbaptized. Katusha then goes to Moscow, where she falls into a life of prostitution, poverty and degradation.

Dmitri, now engaged to Missy, the daughter of the wealthy judge, Prince Kortchagin, is called for jury duty in Kotchagin's court for a murder trial. The case is about a merchant who has been killed, and Dmitri is astonished to see that Katusha is one of the defendants. The jury finds that she is guilty of "giving the powder to the merchant Smerkov without intent to rob", but because they neglected to say without intent to kill, even though the jury intended to free her, the judge sentences her to five years hard labor in Siberia.

Feeling guilty about abandoning Katusha years before, and wanting to redeem her and himself as well, the once-callous nobleman attempts to get her released from prison. He fails in his efforts, so he returns to the prison to ask Katusha to forgive and marry him, which would then help him free her. She refuses, and is furious that he has made her feel again. Katusha's friends think she is a fool to send him away and hold out hope that he will appear again Dmitri frees his serfs, breaks his engagement and follows Katusha to the border of Siberia. This time he will go with her to Siberia where together, they will "live again." This time she accepts him. When he doesn't show up on the day the prisoners are to be transported, Katusha gives up hope, but then he appears on the border of Siberia where the prisoners are being processed: he has divided his land among his servants and wants to "live again" with her forgiveness, help and love.

== Cast ==
- Anna Sten as Katusha Maslova
- Fredric March as Prince Dmitri Nekhlyudov
- Jane Baxter as Missy Kortchagin
- C. Aubrey Smith as Prince Kortchagin
- Sam Jaffe as Gregory Simonson
- Ethel Griffies as Aunt Marie
- Gwendolyn Logan as Aunt Sophia
- Jessie Ralph as Matrona Pavlovna
- Leonid Kinskey as Simon Kartinkin
- Dale Fuller as Botchkova
- Morgan Wallace as The Colonel
- Crauford Kent as Schonbock
- Fritzi Ridgeway as The Redhead

Cast notes:

- Samuel Goldwyn had introduced Anna Sten, who he hoped would become the "new Garbo", earlier in 1934 in the film Nana, then showcased her in this film, and tried again in 1935 with The Wedding Night. None of the three films was a box office success, and Goldwyn released "The Passionate Peasant" from her contract.*This was the first Hollywood film for English actress Jane Baxter.

== Production ==
Unlike many films concerning illicit sex made in the 1930s, We Live Again, which had the working title of "Resurrection", met with the approval of the censors at the Hays Office. Joseph Breen wrote to Will H. Hays: "Though dealing with a sex affair and its attendant consequences, the story has been handled with such fine emphasis on the moral values of repentance and retribution, as to emerge with a definite spiritual quality. We feel that this picture could, in fact, serve as a model for the proper treatment of the element of illicit sex in pictures."

The film was in production from 12 June to 2 August 1934. The New York opening took place during the week of 1 November of that year, with the general American release on 16 November.

We Live Again was the third film version of Resurrection in seven years. It had been made as a silent film, under its original title, in 1927, and again under its original title, as an early talkie starring John Boles in 1931. The story has not been made into a theatrical film version in English since We Live Again.

=== Soviet cinema influence on photography ===
The opening sequences depict the Russian peasantry as they appeared in the 19th century during which Tolstoy's Resurrection is set as well as during Mamoulian's youth, in the final years of the Romanov czarist regime. The cinematography, by Gregg Toland emulates post-revolutionary Soviet films of Sergei Eisenstein and Alexander Dovzhenko

“From the outset, one is translated into the feel and smell of an alien land in a montage of eight brief, low-angled shots which effortlessly capture the glistening, sensuous luster of Dovzhenko’s vision of a new, burgeoning land.”

== Reception ==
Critic Andre Sennwald of the New York Times dismisses producer Samuel Goldwyn claims to having “discovered” Anna Sten and acknowledges her “distinguished background” in Soviet State Theatre as well as Russian and German cinema. Seenwald praises the “faithful” production for “capturing the theme of mystic socialism” in Leo Tolstoy's novel Resurrection. Sten gives “gives an enormously attractive performance” particularly in the courtroom sequences where she is condemned for a crime she did not commit. Noting the films’ “visual loveliness,” the reviewer reserves special mention for production designer Sergei Soudeikin's “distinctive settings” and their integration with director Mamoulian and cameraman Gregg Toland's photography “which is both visually and dramatically stirring.”

The film was a box office disappointment. and “suffered at the hands of critics.”

== Retrospective appraisal ==
Film historian Marc Spergel dismisses this film adaption as “mannered and lifeless,” citing Mamoulian's failure to seriously address any of the social issues at the heart of Tolstoy's 1899 novel. When Mamoulian attempts to dramatize the sentiments of a political prisoner the effect is “gratuitous and meaningless.”

Spergel acknowledges Mamoulian's expert deployment of an array of film techniques, including flashback dissolves and voice-overs and other “cinematic tricks.”:

We Live Again almost looks as if a student of Mamoulian had studied all of his techniques and then tried to reproduce them in this film, but without the understanding and artistry to make them serve the material.

Spergal adds that “the musical score for the film is Hollywood melodramatic at its worse.”

Film historian Tom Milne offers a more sanguine assessment of We Live Again. Milne is untroubled by the lack of historical rigor in Mamoulian adaption of Resurrection, but finds that he “perfectly captures” the duality of the Russian character: “For once one is not embarrassed by a Hollywood attempt to capture Tolstoy’s revolutionary ardors and peasant simplicities.”

Milne is less approving of the second half of the film, in which Mamoulian seems to have somehow lost his momentum. Milne reports that the reunion sequence between Katusha (Anna Sten) and Dimitri (Fredric March) announce a falling off in Mamoulian's grasp of the film, and the prison sequences are “embarrassingly bad.” Milne writes: “So ill-matched are these scenes that they seem like the work of another director.”

Milne rates We Live Again a minor triumph in that in eighty-four minutes, Mamoulian was able to preserve a measure of Tolstoy's vast novel “in what was obviously designed to be consumed as a romance with a happy ending.”
