= Three Russian Girls =

1943 film by Fedor Ozep

- Theatrical poster
- Directed by: Fedor Ozep; Henry S. Kesler
- Written by: Maurice Clark; Dan James
- Produced by: R-F Productions; Gregor Rabinovitch
- Starring: Anna Sten; Kent Smith; Mimi Forsythe
- Cinematography: John J. Mescall
- Edited by: Albrecht Joseph; Gregg C. Tallas; Sam Winston
- Music by: W. Franke Harling
- Distributed by: United Artists
- Release date: December 30, 1943
- Running time: 81 minutes
- Country: United States
- Language: English

Three Russian Girls (also known as She Who Dares) is a 1943 American World War II pro-Soviet propaganda film produced by R-F Productions and distributed by United Artists. It is a remake of the Soviet film The Girl from Leningrad (1941). It was nominated for an Oscar in 1945 for best musical score. It stars Anna Sten.

== Plot ==
The film depicts the life of a group of volunteer nurses for the Red Cross in 1941. Anna Sten portrays a Russian nurse, Natasha, who is one of the volunteers taking care of the Allied soldiers near Stalingrad. As part of her job, she takes care of a newly arrived American flier John Hill, interpreted by Kent Smith. Even though Natasha is betrothed to Sergei Korovin, she starts to fall in love with the American under her care.

When the enemy's forces attack the hospital, the patients and the crew are ordered to evacuate the battleground. Given that there are not enough vehicles, Natasha, John, and other wounded men stay behind waiting to be rescued.

== Cast ==
- Anna Sten as Natasha
- Kent Smith as John Hill
- Mimi Forsythe as Tamara
- Alexander Granach as Major Braginski
- Kathy Frye as Chijik
- Kane Richmond as Sergei
- Manart Kippen as Doctor
- Jack Gardner as Misha
- Marcia Lenack as Shoora
- Mary Herriot as Zina

== Production ==
In September 1942, Metro-Goldwyn-Mayer tried to purchase the film rights to The Girl from Leningrad from Eugene Frenke and Gregor Rabinovich. The studio intended to hire Gregory Ratoff as director and Michèle Morgan and Greta Garbo as the stars. Rabinovich ultimately decided to produce the film independently. He initially hired E. Stork and Igor Vushenko as screenwriters. Maria Manton, Akim Tamiroff, Leonid Kinskey, Tamara Shayne, E. Grusskin, Melva Doney and Diane Duval were announced as initial cast members of the film but were replaced. Rabinovich wanted to cast Luise Rainer as Natasha before hiring Anna Sten. Oona O'Neill and Leo Bulgakov were cast as Tamara and Misha.
