= The Nun and the Sergeant =

1962 film by Franklin Adreon

- Original film poster
- Directed by: Franklin Adreon
- Written by: Don Cerveris
- Produced by: Eugene Frenke
- Starring: Anna Sten; Robert Webber; Leo Gordon; Hari Rhodes; King Moody; Linda Ho
- Cinematography: Paul Ivano
- Edited by: John Hoffman; Carl Mahakian
- Music by: Jerry Fielding
- Production companies: Eastern Productions; Springfield Productions
- Distributed by: United Artists
- Release date: January 1962
- Running time: 74 minutes
- Country: United States
- Language: English

The Nun and the Sergeant is a 1962 Korean War drama film starring Anna Sten and Robert Webber in the title roles. It was produced by Sten's husband Eugene Frenke, who had produced the 1957 film Heaven Knows, Mr Allison, also a pairing of a Catholic nun and a U.S. Marine. It was directed by Franklin Adreon and released through United Artists.

== Plot ==
In a forerunner of The Dirty Dozen, Marine Gunnery Sergeant McGrath takes 12 Marines from the brig and trains them to blow up a tunnel behind North Korean lines. McGrath's only friend on the patrol is his Korean guide Pak. Hating their sergeant, the Marines plan to return to their lines without him, seeing that he becomes "a casualty of war". However, en route to their target they find an injured nun and a group of Korean convent girls whose bus has been destroyed.

The Marines change their views when Sgt. McGrath protects the group. When Dockman, one of the Marines, attempts to rape one of the young girls, the brig rats turn against him. They proceed with their mission as Marines.

== Cast ==
- Robert Webber as Sgt. McGrath
- Anna Sten as Nun
- Leo Gordon as Dockman
- Hari Rhodes as Hall
- Robert Easton as Nupert
- Dale Ishimoto as Pak
- Linda Wong as Bok Soon
- Linda Ho as Soon Cha
- Tod Windsor as Nevins
- Valentin de Vargas as Rivas
- Ken Miller as Quill
- Norman Dupont as Mossback
- Roger Torrey as Turnbridge
- Gregori F. Kris as Johnson
- Caroline Kido as Myung Hee

== Production ==
Don Cerveris was an English teacher breaking into screenwriting; one of his pupils was Frank Zappa. Producer Frenke sought Department of Defense cooperation for the film in 1960 when the project was originally titled The Nun and McGrath. The stars of the film, Robert Webber and Hari Rhodes, and director Franklin Adreon were former Marines.
