= Helen Vinson =

American actress (1907–1999)

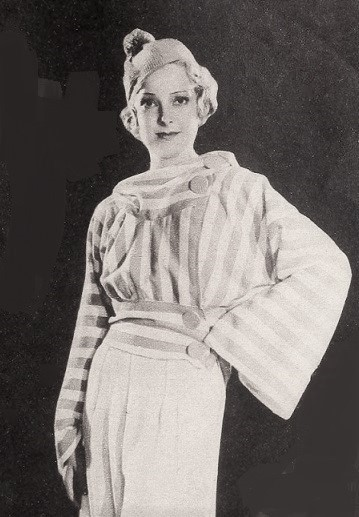
- Vinson in 1933
- Born: Helen Rulfs; September 17, 1907; Beaumont, Texas, U.S.
- Died: October 7, 1999 (aged 92); Chapel Hill, North Carolina, U.S.
- Resting place: Oak Grove Cemetery, Nacogdoches County, Texas, U.S.
- Occupation: Actress
- Years active: 1932–1945
- Spouses: Harry Vickerman (m. 1925; div. 1934) Fred Perry (m. 1935; div. 1938) Donald Hardenbrook (m. 1946; died 1976)

Helen Vinson (born Helen Rulfs, September 17, 1907 – October 7, 1999) was an American film actress who appeared in 40 films between 1932 and 1945.

== Early life ==
Vinson was born in Beaumont, Texas, the daughter of oil man Edward Rulfs. She developed a passion for horses during her youth. She studied at the University of Texas at Austin.

== Theater ==
In Austin, she met March Culmore, director of the Little Theater in Houston, Texas. Culmore took her as a pupil and she was soon playing lead roles with the theater. From Texas, she moved quickly to Broadway, where her credits included Los Angeles (1927), Death Takes a Holiday (1931), Berlin (1931), and The Fatal Alibi (1932). A succession of performances followed and led to a contract with Warner Bros. Later, she regretted her quick leap to Hollywood and motion pictures, saying, "If I'd stayed in New York longer, I'd be getting a much bigger salary out here now."

== Film career ==
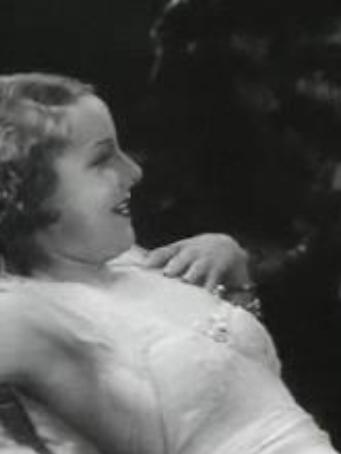
Vinson in The Little Giant (1933)

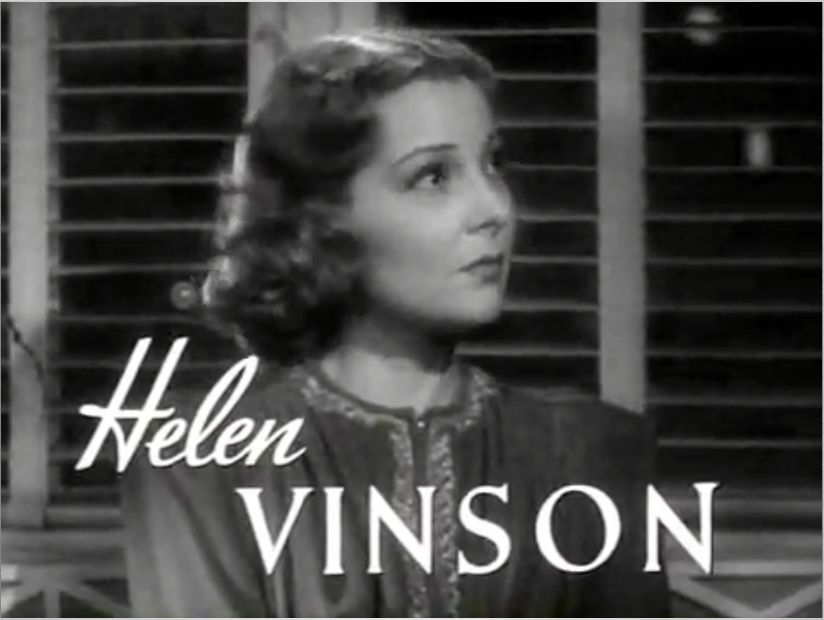
Vinson in Beyond Tomorrow (1940)

Vinson's pre-Code screen roles often featured her as the 'other' woman with an active romantic life. Her first film role was Jewel Robbery (1932), which starred William Powell and Kay Francis. She appeared as Doris Delafield in The Kennel Murder Case, starring Powell as Philo Vance. One of her memorable roles was in The Wedding Night (1935), when she played the wife of Gary Cooper's character and the rival of Anna Sten, in a story about the Connecticut tobacco fields. In the RKO film In Name Only (1939), she was cast as the treacherous friend of Carole Lombard, Kay Francis and Cary Grant's characters. She played an undercover federal agent posing as a femme fatale opposite Richard Cromwell in the anti-Nazi drama Enemy Agent (1940). She followed that role with that of Helen Draque in The Thin Man Goes Home.

Vinson's film career ended in 1945. For her contribution to the motion picture industry, she has a star on the Hollywood Walk of Fame at 1560 Vine Street.

== Private life and death ==
Vinson married Harry Nelson Vickerman, a carpet manufacturer, in Houston, Texas, in May 1925. They divorced on February 7, 1934.

In 1935, she married Fred Perry, a British tennis champion. They lived in England before moving to Hollywood. They divorced in 1938, after which she married Donald Hardenbrook, a "wealthy New York socialite".

Away from film-making and following her retirement, Vinson made frequent trips to New York City to see Broadway shows, visited friends in her home state of Texas, and enjoyed the Mardi Gras in New Orleans. She loved horses and had a private mount named Arrabella.

Helen Vinson died in Chapel Hill, North Carolina in 1999, aged 92.

== Filmography ==
- Jewel Robbery (1932) – Marianne
- Two Against the World (1932) – Corinne Walton
- The Crash (1932) – Esther Parrish (uncredited)
- They Call It Sin (1932) – Enid Hollister
- I Am a Fugitive from a Chain Gang (1932) – Helen
- Lawyer Man (1932) – Barbara Bentley
- Second Hand Wife (1933) – Betty Cavendish
- Grand Slam (1933) – Lola Starr
- The Little Giant (1933) – Polly Cass
- Midnight Club (1933) – Iris Whitney
- The Power and the Glory (1933) – Eve Borden
- The Kennel Murder Case (1933) – Doris Delafield
- As Husbands Go (1934) – Lucille Lingard
- The Life of Vergie Winters (1934) – Laura Shadwell
- Let's Try Again (1934) – Ann (Credits) / Nan Blake
- Gift of Gab (1934) – Nurse
- The Captain Hates the Sea (1934) – Janet Grayson
- Broadway Bill (1934) – Margaret
- A Notorious Gentleman (1935) – Nina Thorne
- The Wedding Night (1935) – Dora Barrett
- Private Worlds (1935) – Claire Monet
- Age of Indiscretion (1935) – Eve Lenhart
- The Tunnel (1935) – Varlia Lloyd
- King of the Damned (1935) – Anna Courvin
- Love in Exile (1936) – Countess Xandra St. Aurion
- Reunion (1936) – Gloria Sheridan
- Vogues of 1938 (1937) – Mary Curson
- Live, Love and Learn (1937) – Lily Chalmers
- In Name Only (1939) – Suzanne
- Married and in Love (1940) – Doris Wilding
- Curtain Call (1940) – Charlotte Morley
- Enemy Agent (1940) – Irene Hunter
- Beyond Tomorrow (1940) – Arlene Terry
- Torrid Zone (1940) – Gloria Anderson
- Bowery Boy (1940) – Peggy Winters
- Nothing But the Truth (1941) – Linda Graham
- Chip Off the Old Block (1944) – Glory Marlow Jr.
- The Lady and the Monster (1944) – Chloe Donovan
- Are These Our Parents? (1944) – Myra Salisbury
- The Thin Man Goes Home (1945) – Helena Draque (final film role)
