= Girl in the Case =

Girl in the Case may refer to:

- Girl in the Case (1934 film), American comedy
- Girl in the Case (1944 film), American mystery-comedy
