= Two Against the World (1932 film) =

1932 film by Archie Mayo

- Directed by: Archie Mayo
- Written by: Sheridan Gibney
- Based on: A Dangerous Set by Marion Dix and Jerry Horwin
- Produced by: Lucien Hubbard
- Starring: Constance Bennett; Neil Hamilton; Helen Vinson
- Cinematography: Charles Rosher
- Edited by: Herbert I. Leeds
- Production company: Warner Bros. Pictures
- Distributed by: Warner Bros. Pictures
- Release date: September 2, 1932
- Running time: 70 minutes
- Country: United States
- Language: English

Two Against the World is a 1932 American pre-Code drama film directed by Archie Mayo and starring Constance Bennett, Neil Hamilton and Helen Vinson. Bennett plays a woman who tries her best to keep her sister and brother out of trouble. It is based on the play A Dangerous Set by Marion Dix and Jerry Horwin. It was produced and distributed by Warner Bros. Pictures. The film, as well as Unashamed (1932), is based on a Philadelphia society murder by Eddie Allen, who killed Francis Donaldson III in an "honor killing". It was a box office success, making $562,000 in profit for the studio.

== Plot ==
Lawyer Dave Norton offers a settlement for the destitute family of a man killed while working for the Hamilton family firm. The upper-class, wealthy Hamiltons gather to decide what to do. They all either vote to fight it in court or, in many cases, simply ignore it. Adele "Dell" Hamilton is an irresponsible socialite who does the latter. However, she and Dave are attracted to each other, despite their very different philosophies of life. He takes her to lunch, and she invites him to an elegant party.

At the party, he receives a cold reception from the rest of the family, who consider him far beneath them, but he astonishes them when it is revealed that his family belongs to their own social class. Bob, Adele's drunkard brother, remains hostile, however, and lies, telling Dave that Dell invited him only to make a fool of him. Dave storms out.

The next day, Dell interrupts an unhappy meeting at Dave's office. She overhears Dave tell his client, Mrs. Polansky, that the Hamiltons' lawyers can postpone the case indefinitely. When the client wonders who will feed her hungry children, Dell gives her $100 and promises her the same every month for as long as the case takes.

One night, Vic Linley wins a great deal of money from Bob. When Dell pleads with Vic to go easy on her brother, he reveals that he is interested in her, having just broken off an affair with her married sister Corinne. Later, Bob finds a vanity case with the Hamilton family seal under a pillow in Vic's bedroom. He assumes it belongs to Dell (rather than Corinne). When he accuses Dell, she pretends it is true in order to protect her sister. Furious and drunk, Bob goes back to Vic's place. Dell chases after him, but is too late. Bob shoots and kills Vic in the elevator. The siblings quickly leave the scene.

Unaware that Bob is the killer, District Attorney Mills agrees to keep the Hamilton name out of the scandal, but public opinion and newspaper reporter Segall will not let the case be forgotten. Blaming Dave for the uproar, Mills forces the lawyer to take over the case as a newly appointed deputy district attorney by threatening to ruin his career. Dell, however, believes he took the job to further his ambitions.

By bad luck, the doorman recognizes Dell when she leaves Dave's office, and she is put on trial. When she is called to the witness stand, however, Dave cannot bring himself to cross examine her too closely and accepts her unconvincing story. However, the doorman catches her in a lie, and the truth mostly comes out (except for Corinne's part in it). Bob is acquitted for defending his sister's honor, and Dell and Dave get back together.

== Cast ==
- Constance Bennett as Adele "Dell" Hamilton
- Neil Hamilton as David "Dave" Norton
- Helen Vinson as Corinne Walton
- Allen Vincent as Bob Hamilton
- Gavin Gordon as Victor H. "Vic" Linley
- Walter Walker as Courtney Hamilton
- Roscoe Karns as Segall
- Alan Mowbray as George "Georgie" Walton
- Hale Hamilton as Gordon Mitchell
- Oscar Apfel as District Attorney Howard Mills
- Louise Carter as Mrs. Polansky

== Bibliography ==
- Carman, Emily. Independent Stardom: Freelance Women in the Hollywood Studio System. University of Texas Press, 2015.
- Kellow, Brian. The Bennetts: An Acting Family. University Press of Kentucky, 2004.
