= The Wedding Night =

1935 American romantic film by King Vidor

- Theatrical release poster
- Directed by: King Vidor
- Screenplay by: Edith Fitzgerald
- Story by: Edwin H. Knopf
- Produced by: Samuel Goldwyn
- Starring: Gary Cooper; Anna Sten; Ralph Bellamy; Helen Vinson; Sig Ruman
- Cinematography: Gregg Toland
- Edited by: Stuart Heisler
- Music by: Alfred Newman
- Production company: Samuel Goldwyn Productions
- Distributed by: United Artists
- Release date: March 8, 1935 (US)
- Running time: 83 minutes
- Country: United States
- Language: English
- Box office: $174,081

The Wedding Night is a 1935 American romantic tragedy film directed by King Vidor and starring Gary Cooper and Anna Sten. Written by Edith Fitzgerald and based on a story by Edwin H. Knopf, the film is about a financially strapped novelist who returns to his country home in Connecticut looking for inspiration for his next novel and becomes involved with a beautiful young Polish woman and her family.

The film was produced by Samuel Goldwyn and filmed at Samuel Goldwyn Studios from early November to early December 1934. It was released in the United States on March 8, 1935.

The film received generally positive reviews, with The New York Times calling it "both pictorially and dramatically striking". Despite the reviews, the film did poorly at the box office, earning only $174,081. King Vidor won the Volpi Cup for Best Director at the Venice Film Festival in 1935.

The Wedding Night was released in DVD format by 20th Century Fox Home Entertainment on May 22, 2007. In February 2020, the film was shown at the 70th Berlin International Film Festival, as part of a retrospective dedicated to King Vidor's career.

== Plot ==
New York novelist Tony Barrett (Gary Cooper) and his wife Dora (Helen Vinson) have accumulated serious debts as a result of their fast and affluent lifestyle in the big city. When Tony approaches his publisher expecting an advance on his newest novel, he is told that success has gone to his head and the novel is unpublishable. With few options available, Tony and Dora move to his family's run-down farm in Connecticut, where they meet his neighbors: a Polish farmer, Jan Novak (Sig Ruman), and his beautiful daughter, Manya (Anna Sten). Looking to expand his own property, Mr. Novak offers Tony $5,000 for a field bordering the Novak farm, and the author eagerly accepts. With their finances replenished, Dora returns to New York, leaving Tony at the farm, where he intends to write a new novel inspired by the Novaks and their friends.

Sometime later, Tony and Manya are at his house discussing her betrothal to Fredrik (Ralph Bellamy), the young man chosen by her father to be her husband. A drunken Tony tells Manya that she is not in love with the young man, and makes suggestive remarks that anger her. The following day, Tony apologizes to Manya and the two begin a close friendship. After Tony's servant leaves to return to New York, Manya begins spending more time at Tony's farm and the two fall in love, just like the characters in his new novel, Stephen and Sonya. Fredrik soon learns that Manya has been seeing Tony at his farm, and he and her father forbid her from seeing Tony again. Ignoring their orders, Manya continues to spend time with the novelist at his house. One evening, a snow storm prevents Manya from returning home. The next morning, Mr. Novak angrily confronts Tony at his farm. Later, he demands that Manya marry Fredrik the following Monday. When Manya tells him that she will not spend her life being an unpaid servant like her mother, Novak slaps her.

Later that day, Dora arrives back at the farm, telling her husband that she missed him terribly during their separation. Dora hears stories about the previous night, and hopes that they mean nothing. When she reads his new manuscript, however, she suspects that the love affair between the characters of Stephen and Sonya reflect her husband's own feelings for Manya. On the night before her wedding, Manya goes to see Tony, but finds Dora instead. The two speak about Tony's new novel and how it will end—both realizing that they are really speaking about their own lives. Dora tells Manya that she is sure that Stephen's wife will not give up her husband, but that she would feel sorry for Sonya. Manya tells her about the upcoming wedding, and then leaves.

When Tony returns home, he asks Dora for a divorce, but she refuses, telling him that his novel should end with Sonya marrying her Polish fiancé. The next day, after learning that Manya and Fredrik are getting married, Tony goes to the wedding party and dances with Manya. Later, a drunken Fredrik, angered by his fiancé's lack of passion and interest on their wedding night, storms out of their bedroom and goes to Tony's house to confront the man he suspects is to blame. Manya follows him to Tony's house, where she attempts to stop Fredrik from fighting with Tony on the stairs. During the struggle, Manya falls down the stairs and is seriously injured. Tony carries her to the parlor, where he tells her he loves her, just before she dies. Later, Dora tells Tony that he can now see Manya privately. Gazing out the window, Tony tells her about how full of life Manya was and imagines that she is waving to him.

== Cast ==
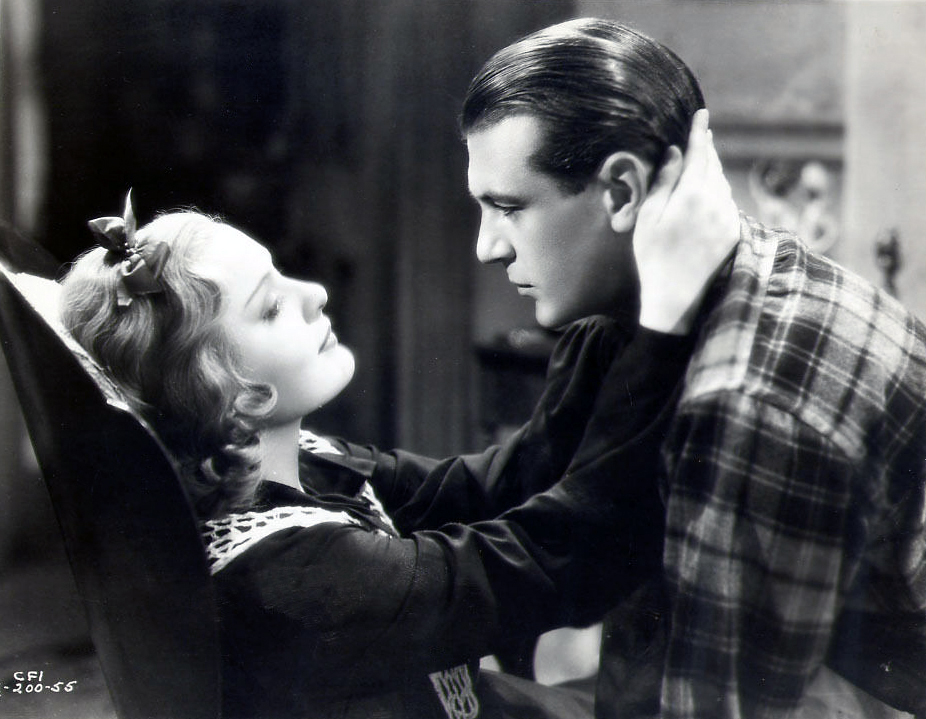
Gary Cooper and Anna Sten publicity photo for The Wedding Night

- Gary Cooper as Tony Barrett
- Anna Sten as Manya Novak
- Ralph Bellamy as Fredrik Sobieski
- Helen Vinson as Dora Barrett
- Sig Ruman as Mr. Jan Novak
- Esther Dale as Mrs. Kaise Novak
- Leonid Snegoff as Sobieski
- Eleanor Wesselhoeft as Mrs. Sobieski
- Milla Davenport as Grandmother
- Agnes Anderson as Helena
- Hilda Vaughn as Hezzie Jones
- Walter Brennan as Bill Jenkins
- Otto Yamaoka as Chinese servant (uncredited)

== Production ==
Anna Sten came to the attention of American movie mogul Samuel Goldwyn in early 1932 while the actress was still making films in Germany. Born in Kyiv in 1908, Anjuschka Stenski began her career making films for Mezhrabpom-Russ film studio, becoming the protege of director Fedor Ozep, who became her husband. They moved to Berlin and began making films there. Goldwyn had been looking for a foreign-born actress that he could build up as the rival of Greta Garbo, and possible successor to Vilma Bánky, with whom Goldwyn had great success in the silent era. He brought her to America and signed her to a four-year contract, spending the next year having his new star tutored in English and teaching her Hollywood screen acting methods. He poured a great deal of time and money into her first American film, Nana (1934), a somewhat homogenized version of Émile Zola's scandalous nineteenth century novel. However, the film was not successful at the box office, nor was her subsequent Goldwyn film, We Live Again (1934). Goldwyn decided to pair her with Gary Cooper for her third American film.

The Wedding Night was filmed at Samuel Goldwyn Studios in West Hollywood, California from early November to early December 1934. The film was originally titled Broken Soil. When director King Vidor began filming scenes with Cooper, he was initially disappointed and the actor's apparent "mumbling and stumbling" style. When he viewed footage from that first day, however, the director was surprised to see "a performance that overflowed with charm and personality ... a highly complex and fascinating inner personality revealed itself on the projection room screen".

This was the second of eight films in which both Cooper and Brennan appeared.

== Release ==
The Wedding Night was released in the United States on March 8, 1935.

== Critical response ==
In his review in The New York Times, Andre Sennwald praised the film for its "uncommonly adult style", calling it "both pictorially and dramatically striking". Sennwald also noted the "uniformly expert" performances by Cooper who "continues to reveal a refreshing sense of humor in his work", the "highly talented" Sten, and Vinson who is "excellently right as the wife, playing the part with such intelligence and sympathy that she contributes definitely to the power of the climax". Sennwald concludes:

The Wedding Night displays an unusual regard for the truth and it is courageous enough to allow an affair which is obviously doomed to end logically in tragedy. Although its materials are too conventional to result in great screen drama, the film is handsomely arresting, and it represents a satisfying compromise between Mr. Vidor, the realist, and Mr. Goldwyn, the romantic.

The Wedding Night has received generally favorable reviews from recent film critics. In his review for the Immortal Ephemera website, Cliff Aliperti gave the film eight out of ten stars, calling it a "frank romance" with "standout performances" by Gary Cooper, Anna Sten, and Helen Vinson. Aliperti praises Cooper's "quiet intensity, his lovable clumsiness at close quarters, and his strong sense of will power". He rejects contemporary views of Sten as "Goldwyn's Folly" noting that she is "at her best in the more universal silent moments, where she can really emote". He also called Vinson's portrayal of Dora "the best performance I've ever seen [her] give". Aliperti is equally impressed with Vidor's direction, observing that it "adds an impressive slice of Americana to an overall output that forever captures the America of his time". Aliperti concludes: "The Wedding Night is well-acted, touching, shocking in a few spots, and mature, with interesting visuals provided especially by the Polish ceremony of the title. An exciting movie to view for the first time."

TV Guide gave the film three out of five stars, noting, "Although the film has a great deal of artistic merit—Goldwyn's influence, Vidor's directorial skill, and Toland's sharp photography—it fell victim to indifference on the part of moviegoers ... [and] just didn't make much of an impression on the Depression-era audiences." Jeremy Heilman on the MovieMartyr website called the film "a satisfying, if unexceptional, melodrama buoyed by its performances".

== Box office ==
Despite the critical praise, the movie was not a box-office success.

The film earned a box office gross of only $174,081 (equivalent to $4,087,946 in 2025). The film became known around Hollywood as "Goldwyn's Last Sten". After the public failed to embrace his Ukrainian actress, Goldwyn informed Sten that he was suspending her contract.

== Accolades ==
- 1935 Venice Film Festival Award for Best Director (King Vidor) Won

== Home media ==
The Wedding Night was released in DVD format by 20th Century Fox Home Entertainment on May 22, 2007.
