= Sig Ruman =

German-American actor (1884–1967)

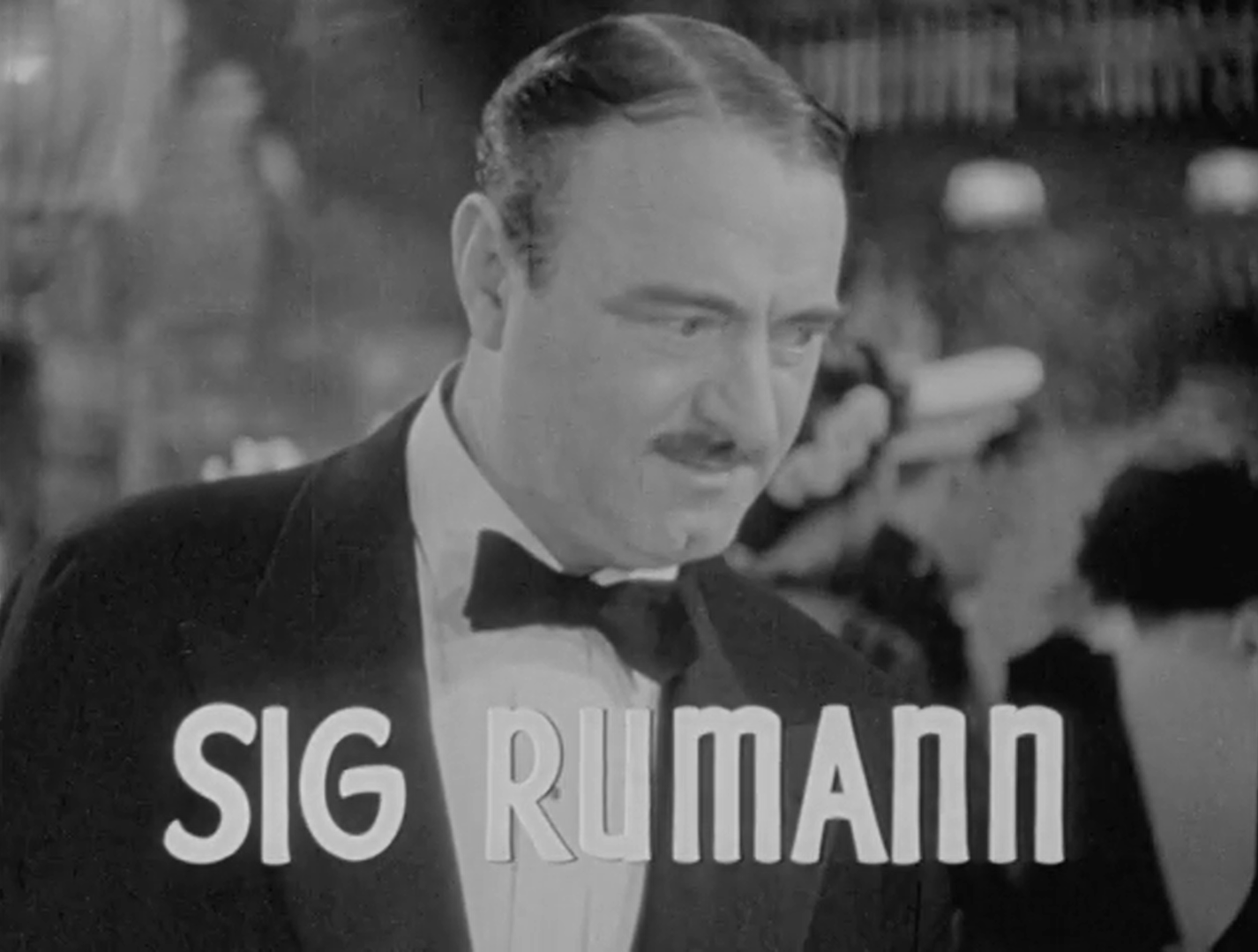
- Trailer for Think Fast, Mr. Moto (1937)
- Born: Siegfried Carl Alban Rumann; October 11, 1884; Hamburg, Germany
- Died: February 14, 1967 (aged 82); Julian, California, U.S.
- Resting place: Julian Cemetery, San Diego County, California
- Other names: Siegfried Rumann; Sig Rumann
- Occupation: Actor
- Years active: 1928–1966
- Spouses: Else Rumann (m. 1905): Clara Ruman
- Children: 1

Siegfried Carl Alban Rumann (October 11, 1884 – February 14, 1967), billed as Sig Ruman and Sig Rumann, was a German-American character actor known for his portrayals of pompous and often stereotypically Teutonic officials or villains in more than 100 films.

== Early years ==
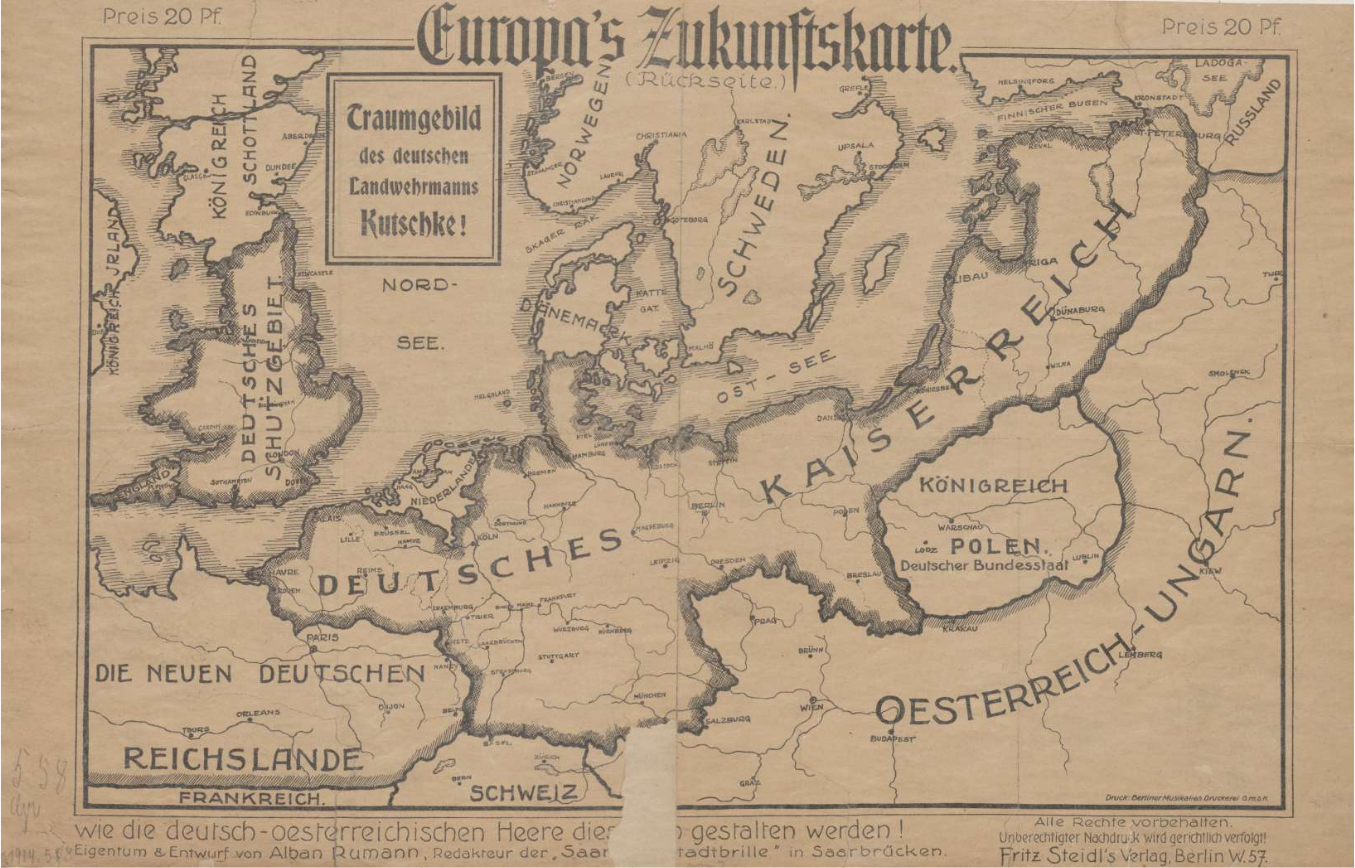
Europe's future map – a 1915 lithography card designed by Rumann's father, depicting the German Empire's World War I territorial ambitions, contrasted with those of the Entente on the reverse side. A caption reads: "Dream vision of the German militiaman Kutschke!". (Note: Kutschke was the fictional author of the German soldier song from the Franco-Prussian War known as the Kutschkelied.)

Born in Hamburg, German Empire, to Alban Julius Albrecht Ludwig Rumann and his wife, Caroline Margarethe Sophie Rumann on October 11, 1884, he studied electrical engineering, then began working as an actor and musician before serving with the Imperial German Army during World War I. He resumed his acting career after the war. After he immigrated to the United States in 1924, his acting career blossomed. Befriending playwright George S. Kaufman and theater critic Alexander Woollcott, he enjoyed success in many Broadway productions. His Broadway credits included Once There Was a Russian (1961), Lily of the Valley (1942), Eight Bells (1933), Alien Corn (1933), Grand Hotel (1930), Half Gods (1929), and The Channel Road (1929).

== Film ==
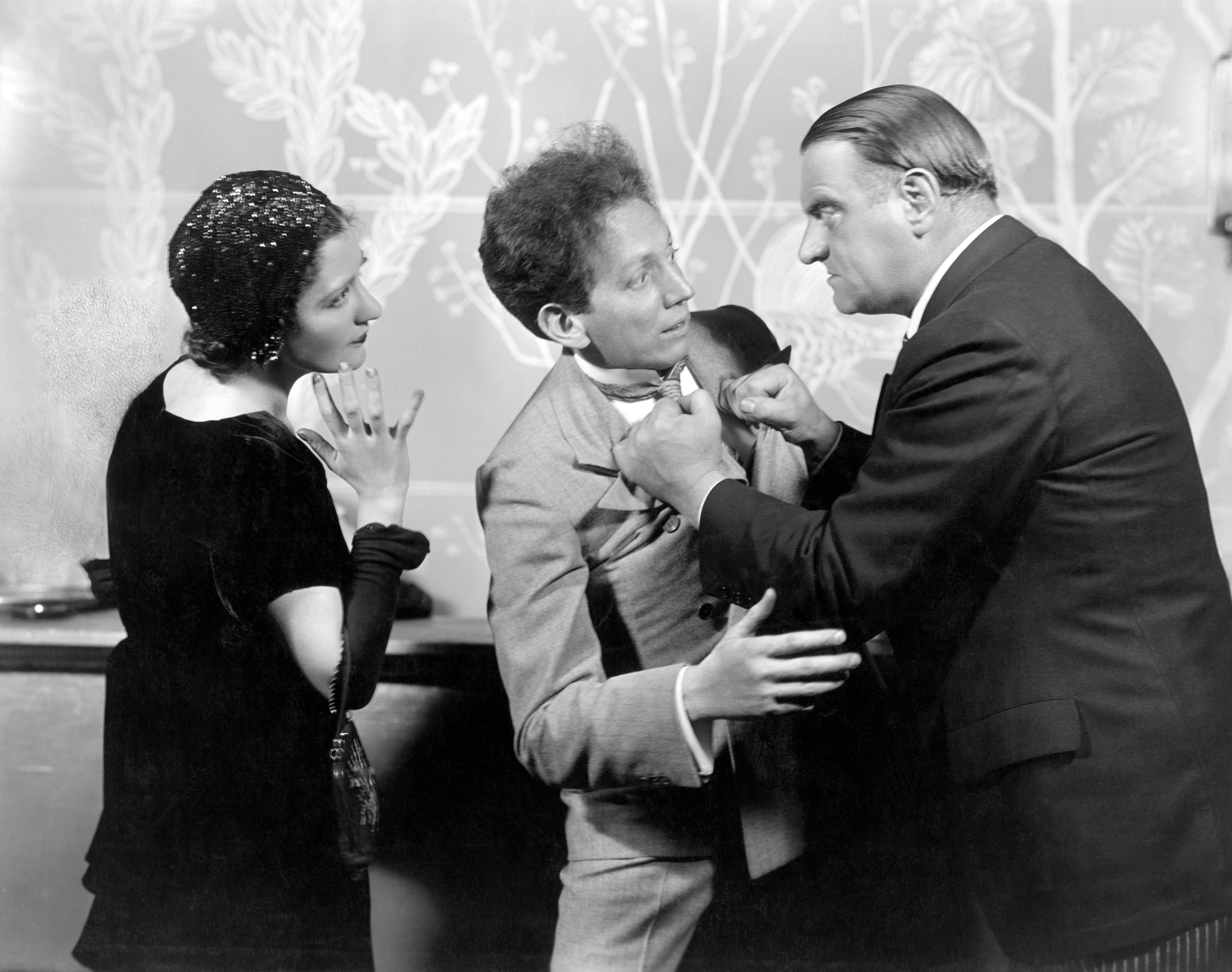
Hortense Alden, Sam Jaffe and Sig Ruman in the original Broadway production of Grand Hotel (1930)

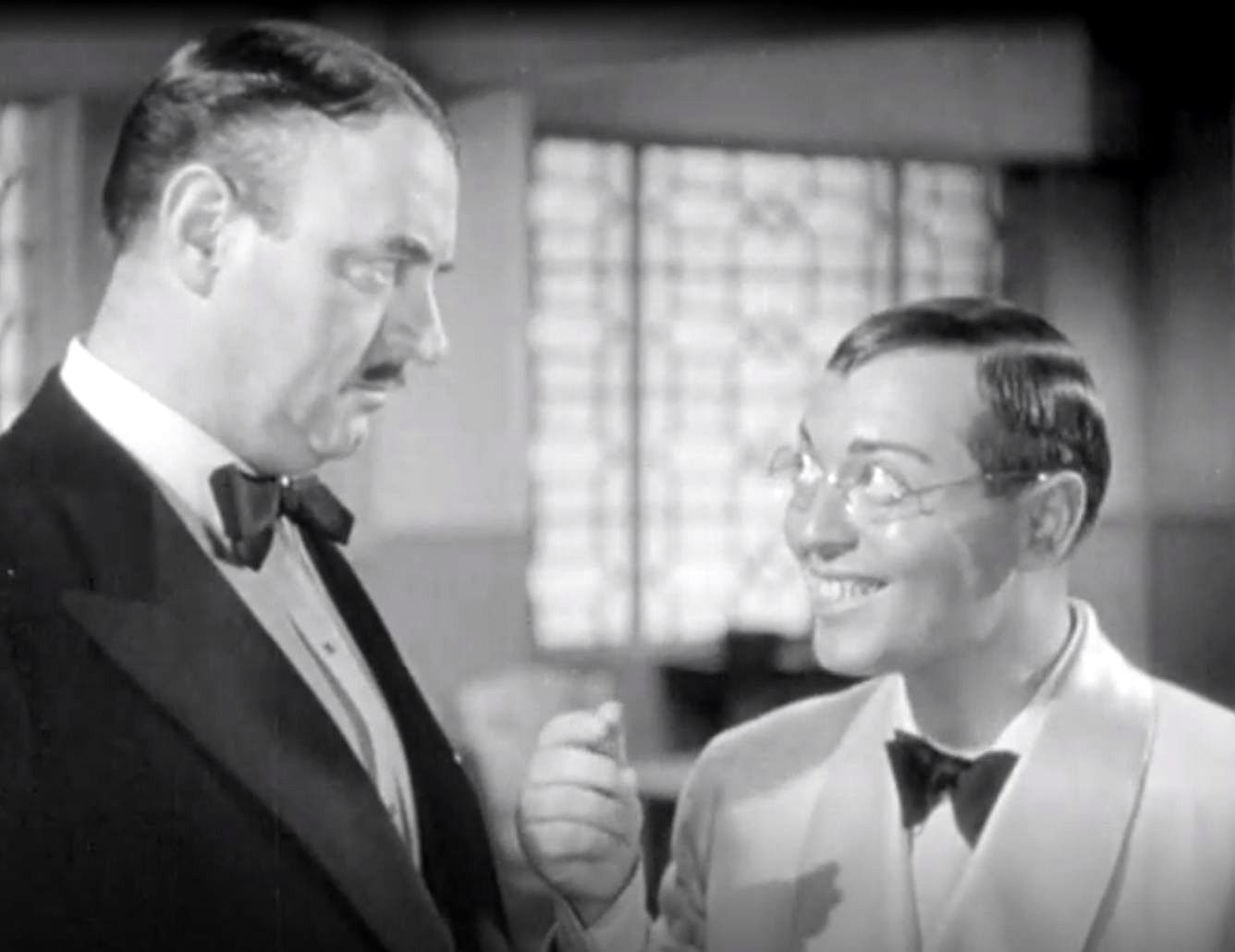
With Peter Lorre in Think Fast, Mr. Moto (1937)

Ruman made his film debut in Lucky Boy (1929). He became a favorite comic foil of the Marx Brothers, appearing in A Night at the Opera (1935), A Day at the Races (1937), and A Night in Casablanca (1946). His German accent and large stature kept him busy during World War II, playing sinister Nazi characters in a series of wartime thrillers.

During this period, he also appeared in several films by director Ernst Lubitsch, a fellow German émigré, including Ninotchka (1939), portraying a Russian, and in To Be or Not to Be (1942) as the pompous Nazi Colonel "Concentration-Camp" Erhardt; he played the role of Professor Herman Von Reiter in Shining Victory (1941), an adaptation of an A. J. Cronin play. Ruman continued his trend of portraying over-the-top German characters later in his career for Lubitsch's protege Billy Wilder, in his films The Emperor Waltz (1948), and Stalag 17 (1953). Ruman's voice was dubbed over German actor Hubert Von Meyerinck's voice in Wilder's One, Two, Three (1961), and he had a cameo role in The Fortune Cookie (1966).

Around 1936, Ruman modified his screen name from Siegfried Rumann to Sig Ruman in an attempt to make it a little less German-sounding, as anti-German prejudice was rising at that time, just prior to the outbreak of the Second World War.

Despite declining health during the 1950s and 1960s, Ruman continued to appear in films and made many guest appearances on television. He guest-starred as pompous Broadway director Eric von Bissell in the memorable 1965 episode of The Addams Family, "My Fair Cousin Itt".

== Death ==
Ruman died of a heart attack on February 14, 1967, at his home in Julian, California, at the age of 82. He was buried in Julian Cemetery, San Diego County, California.

From his first marriage, to Else Rumann, he had a daughter named Senta.

== Selected filmography ==
- Lucky Boy (1928) Bit Part (uncredited)
- The Royal Box (1929) as Bailiff
- All Quiet On The Western Front (1930, uncredited)
- The World Moves On (1934) as Baron von Gerhardt
- Servants' Entrance (1934) as Hans Hansen
- Marie Galante (1934) as Brogard
- Under Pressure (1935) as Doctor
- The Wedding Night (1935) as Mr. Jan Novak
- Spring Tonic (1935) as Matt Conklin
- The Farmer Takes a Wife (1935) as Blacksmith
- A Night at the Opera (1935) as Herman Gottlieb
- East of Java (1935) as Hans Muller
- The Princess Comes Across (1936) as Detective Steindorf
- The Bold Cabarello (1936) as Commandante Sebastian Golle
- On the Avenue (1937) as Herr Hanfstangel
- Seventh Heaven (1937) as Durand
- Maytime (1937) as Fanchon
- Thin Ice (1937) as Prime Minister Ulricht
- Midnight Taxi (1937) as John B. Rudd
- The Great Hospital Mystery (1937) as Dr. Taggert
- This Is My Affair (1937) as Gus
- A Day at the Races (1937) as Dr. Leopold X. Steinberg
- Think Fast, Mr. Moto (1937) as Nicolas Marloff
- Love Under Fire (1937) as General Montero
- Lancer Spy (1937) as Lt. Col. Gottfried Hollen
- Heidi (1937) as Police Captain
- Nothing Sacred (1937) as Dr. Emil Eggelhoffer
- Thank You, Mr. Moto (1937) as Colonel Tchernov
- Paradise for Three (1938) as Mr. Bold
- The Saint in New York (1938) as Hutch Rellin
- I'll Give a Million (1938) as Anatole Primerose
- Suez (1938) as Sergeant Pellerin
- Girls on Probation (1938) as Roger Heath
- The Great Waltz (1938) as Wertheimer
- Honolulu (1939) as Psychiatrist
- Never Say Die (1939) as Poppa Ingleborg
- Confessions of a Nazi Spy (1939) as Krogman
- Only Angels Have Wings (1939) as Dutchy
- Ninotchka (1939) as Iranoff
- Remember? (1939) as Dr. Schmidt
- Dr. Ehrlich's Magic Bullet (1940) as Dr. Hans Wolfert
- Outside the Three-Mile Limit (1940) as Van Cleve
- I Was an Adventuress (1940) as Herr Protz
- Four Sons (1940) as Newmann
- Bitter Sweet (1940) as Herr Schlick
- Comrade X (1940) as Emil Von Hofer
- Victory (1940) as Mr. Schomberg
- So Ends Our Night (1941) as Ammers
- The Man Who Lost Himself (1941) as Dr. Simms
- That Uncertain Feeling (1941) as Kafka
- The Wagons Roll at Night (1941) as Hoffman the Great
- Love Crazy (1941) as Dr. Wuthering
- Shining Victory (1941) as Professor Herman Von Reiter
- World Premiere (1941) as Franz von Bushmaster
- This Woman Is Mine (1941) as John Jacob Astor
- To Be or Not to Be (1942) as Colonel Ehrhardt
- Remember Pearl Harbor (1942) as Dirk Van Hoorten
- Crossroads (1942) as Dr. Alex Dubroc
- Enemy Agents Meet Ellery Queen (1942) as Heinrich - Spy Leader
- Berlin Correspondent (1942) as Dr. Dietrich
- Desperate Journey (1942) as Preuss
- China Girl (1942) as Jarubi
- Tarzan Triumphs (1943) as German Sergeant
- They Came to Blow Up America (1943) as Dr. Herman Holger
- Sweet Rosie O'Grady (1943) as Joe Flugelman
- Government Girl (1943) as Ambassador
- The Song of Bernadette (1943) as Louis Bouriette
- It Happened Tomorrow (1944) as Mr. Beckstein
- The Hitler Gang (1944) as General von Hindenburg
- Summer Storm (1944) as Kuzma
- House of Frankenstein (1944) as Hussman
- A Royal Scandal (1945) as Gen. Ronsky
- Men in Her Diary (1945) as Mme. Irene
- The Dolly Sisters (1945) as Ignatz Tsimmis
- She Went to the Races (1945) as Dr. Gurke
- A Night in Casablanca (1946) as Count Pfefferman alias Heinrich Stubel
- Night and Day (1946) as Wilowski
- Faithful in My Fashion (1946) as Professor Boris Riminoffsky
- Mother Wore Tights (1947) as Papa
- If You Knew Susie (1948) as Count Alexis
- The Emperor Waltz (1948) as Dr. Zwieback
- Give My Regards to Broadway (1948) as Arthur Dinkel
- Border Incident (1949) as Hugo Wolfgang Ulrich
- Father Is a Bachelor (1950) as Jericho Schlosser
- On the Riviera (1951) as Gapeaux
- The World in His Arms (1952) as General Ivan Vorashilov
- O. Henry's Full House (1952) as Menkie (segment "The Gift of the Magi") (uncredited)
- Ma and Pa Kettle on Vacation (1953) as Cyrus Kraft
- Stalag 17 (1953) as Sgt. Johann Sebastian Schulz
- Die Jungfrau auf dem Dach (1953) as Michael O'Neill
- Houdini (1953) as Schultz
- The Glenn Miller Story (1954) as Kranz
- Living It Up (1954) as Dr. Emile Egelhofer
- White Christmas (1954) as Landlord (uncredited)
- 3 Ring Circus (1954) as Colonel Fritz Schlitz
- Carolina Cannonball (1955) as Stefan
- Many Rivers to Cross (1955) as Spectacle Man
- Spy Chasers (1955) as King Rako of Truania
- The Wings of Eagles (1957) as Manager
- The Errand Boy (1961) as Baron Elston Carteblanche
- One, Two, Three (1961) as Count von Droste Schattenburg (voice, uncredited)
- Robin and the 7 Hoods (1964) as Hammacher (uncredited)
- 36 Hours (1964) as German Guard
- The Last of the Secret Agents? (1966) as Prof. Werner von Koenig
- The Fortune Cookie (1966) as Professor Winterhalter
- Way...Way Out (1966) as Russian Delegate
