= Heaven Knows, Mr. Allison =

1957 film by John Huston

- Theatrical poster
- Directed by: John Huston
- Screenplay by: John Huston; John Lee Mahin
- Based on: Heaven Knows, Mr. Allison by Charles Shaw
- Produced by: Buddy Adler; Eugene Frenke
- Starring: Deborah Kerr; Robert Mitchum
- Cinematography: Oswald Morris
- Edited by: Russell Lloyd
- Music by: Georges Auric
- Color process: Color by DeLuxe
- Production company: 20th Century-Fox
- Distributed by: 20th Century-Fox
- Release date: March 13, 1957
- Running time: 106 minutes
- Country: United States
- Languages: English; Japanese
- Budget: $2,905,000
- Box office: $4.2 million (US)

Heaven Knows, Mr. Allison is a 1957 American CinemaScope war film released by Twentieth Century-Fox starring Deborah Kerr as an Irish nun and Robert Mitchum as a U.S. Marine, both stranded on a Japanese-occupied island in the Pacific Ocean during World War II. Directed by John Huston, it was adapted by Huston and John Lee Mahin from the 1952 novel by Charles Shaw. It was nominated for Academy Awards for Best Actress in a Leading Role (Deborah Kerr) and Best Writing, Screenplay Based on Material from Another Medium.

The movie was filmed in Trinidad and Tobago in what was then the British West Indies. Producer Eugene Frenke later filmed The Nun and the Sergeant, a low-budget variation on the story, (1962), starring his wife Anna Sten.

== Plot ==
In the South Pacific in 1944, U.S. Marine Corporal Allison and his reconnaissance party are disembarking from a U.S. Navy submarine when they are discovered and fired upon by the Imperial Japanese Army (IJA). The submarine's captain is forced to dive and leave the scouting team behind. Allison reaches a rubber raft and, after days adrift, reaches an island. He finds an abandoned settlement, and locates its sole inhabitant, novice Irish nun Sister Angela, in its chapel. She has been on the island for only four days, having come with an elderly priest to evacuate another clergyman only to find that the Japanese had arrived first. The frightened natives who had brought them to the island left the pair without warning, and the priest died soon after.

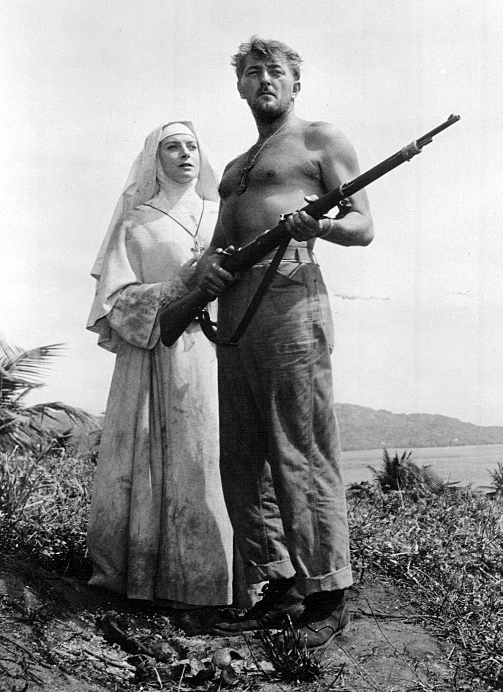
Robert Mitchum and Deborah Kerr in a scene from the film

For a while, they have the island to themselves, but then a detachment of Japanese troops arrives, forcing them to hide in a cave. When Sister Angela is unable to stomach the raw fish that Allison has caught, he sneaks into the Japanese camp for supplies, narrowly avoiding detection. That night, they watch flashes from naval guns exchanging fire in a sea battle over the horizon.

The Japanese unexpectedly depart, leaving valuable supplies behind. Overwhelmed by emotion, Allison professes his love for Sister Angela, proposing marriage. She shows him her engagement ring, explaining that it is a symbol of her forthcoming final holy vows. Later both in celebration and frustration, Allison gets drunk on sake. He blurts out that he considers her devotion to her vows to be pointless since they are stuck on the island "like Adam and Eve," and may be for years. She runs out into a tropical rain and falls ill with a chill. Allison, sober and contrite, finds her shivering in the cave. He cares for her carries her back to the camp, but the Japanese have returned, forcing them to retreat to the cave. Allison sneaks into the Japanese camp to get blankets. He kills a soldier who discovers him, alerting the enemy. To force him into the open, the Japanese start burning the island's undergrowth.

When a Japanese soldier discovers the cave, Allison and Sister Angela have two options: surrender or die from a hand grenade thrown inside. Just then, a shell hits...the Americans have begun softening the island in preparation for an amphibious landing. Allison comments that the assault will not be easy, as the Japanese have concealed four deadly 105 mm artillery rifles pointed towards the beach, deadly to landing craft.

Responding to what he believes is a message from God, Allison removes the weapons' breechblocks while the Japanese are still in their bunkers riding out the barrage. He is wounded, but the Americans easily take the island facing only small arms fire.

Sister Angela and Allison say their goodbyes as the Marines arrive. Allison has reconciled himself to Sister Angela's dedication to God, and she reassures him that wherever she is he will be her close "companion."

== Cast ==
- Deborah Kerr as Sister Angela
- Robert Mitchum as USMC Corporal Allison
- Akira Ohno (uncredited)
- Masao Ukon (uncredited)
- S. Nakagawa (uncredited)
- I. Miynai (uncredited)

== Production ==
John Lee Mahin, who wrote the script, called the original novel by Charles Shaw "a very dirty book" and claims producer Gene Frenke kept pushing for more sex to be added. However this was resisted by Mahin and John Huston.

Filming began in August 1956 on the islands of Trinidad and Tobago, allowing Huston and Fox to use blocked funds in the UK, receive British film finance and qualify for subsidization under the Eady Levy. The film was set later in the war than it was in the novel, which had Allison escaping from the Battle of Corregidor. In the film, the Allies gain the offensive and U.S. Marines capture the island.

The screenplay compares the rituals and commitment of the Catholic Church and the United States Marine Corps. The National Legion of Decency monitored the production of the film closely, sending a representative to observe the filming; Deborah Kerr and Robert Mitchum ad-libbed a spoof scene (not included in the final print) in which their characters wildly kissed and grabbed at each other.

The Marines provided troops for the invasion climax. Six Japanese persons living in Brazil played some of the leading Japanese characters, and Chinese people from some of the laundries and restaurants of Trinidad and Tobago played the rest of the Japanese soldiers.

Screen Archives Entertainment released Heaven Knows, Mr. Allison on Blu-ray on June 10, 2014.

== Reception ==
Contemporary reviews were positive.

According to Kinematograph Weekly, the film was "in the money" at the British box office in 1957.

The Chicago Tribune critic wrote, "Both stars' performances are excellent. However, I fail to see why Miss Kerr was hampered by the necessity to assume a brogue, which doesn't come naturally. Mr. Mitchum has the edge on her as far as being well cast, and will, I think, be most believable to the average audience, altho I doubt that any veteran Marine would stand out and do a jig under shellfire—even if it comes from the guns of the United States Navy as a prelude to a welcome American invasion. The film, in script and direction, was obviously aimed at mass audience appeal. That it probably will have."

The New York Times was complimentary: "That frequent and often popular story of a pious woman and an impious man cast together in circumstances that test the righteousness and fiber of each is tackled again by John Huston (he tackled it last in The African Queen)....And once more, Mr. Huston comes up with a film that is stirring and entertaining....with Deborah Kerr and Robert Mitchum in the leading roles—indeed, the only real roles in the picture—he has got it buckled to solid characters....If there does seem to be some repetition, that is something that has to be blamed on the singleness of the location and the meagerness of the cast. There are not many variations to be wrung from the situation. However, the location is exciting...and it is drenched with atmosphere. And the cast, while small, is excellent."

On the review aggregator website Rotten Tomatoes, 85% of 13 critics' reviews are positive.

== Awards and honors ==
Award	Category	Nominee(s)	Result
Academy Awards	Best Actress	Deborah Kerr	Nominated
Academy Awards	Best Writing, Screenplay Based on Material from Another Medium	John Lee Mahin and John Huston	Nominated

== See also ==
- List of American films of 1957
