= Life Returns =

1934 film by Eugene Frenke

- Window Card for the film
- Directed by: Eugene Frenke
- Screenplay by: Arthur Horman; John F. Goodrich; Mary Eunice McCarthy (additional dialogue; as Mary McCarthy); L. Wolfe Gilbert (additional dialogue)
- Story by: Eugene Frenke; James Hogan
- Produced by: Lou Ostrow
- Starring: Onslow Stevens; George Breakston; Lois Wilson
- Cinematography: Robert H. Planck
- Edited by: Harry Marker
- Music by: Oliver Wallace; Clifford Vaughan
- Production companies: Scienart Pictures; Universal Pictures
- Release date: 1934
- Running time: 60 minutes
- Country: United States
- Language: English

Life Returns is an American film directed by Eugene Frenke. The film stars Onslow Stevens, George P. Breakston and Lois Wilson with a plot that involves a doctor who is convinced that the dead can be brought back to life gets the chance to prove his theory on a dog that has recently died. Eugene Frenke created a film record of the operation and developed a film that would incorporate the footage of Robert E. Cornish who was doing experiments that successfully let him bring dead animals back to life.

Following a preview screening of the film, Universal pulled the film from a general release after declared the film to be a "freak picture, not suitable for the regular Universal program". The film was pulled from any general release but appears to have received a roadshow release. Despite reviews appearing in trade papers in 1934 and 1935, it is not clear when the film was first released. In 1937, Frenke brought a $145,424 lawsuit against Universal, charging that the studio had not released Life Returns through regular channels. It was re-released theatrically by Scienart Pictures in 1938.

== Plot ==
At Hoskins University, three scientists, John Kendrick, Louise Stone, and Robert E. Cornish are attempting to develop a fluid that will restore life to the dead. After graduation, Kendrick announces to Cornish and Stone that he had secured work for them at the Arnold Research Laboratory. Louise and Cornish however, believe that their research has no place at a commercial laboratory. Kendrick goes to the foundation to work leaving Stone and Cornish behind.

Time passes and Kendrick marries a socialite while A.K Arnold loses confidence in Kendrick's experiments, believing it to be noncommercial, leading Kendrick to resign. Kendrick works in a private medical practice when Mr.s Kendrick tries to argue that he has a wife and child to support. Years pass again and Mrs. Kendrick dies, leading to court officials wanting Kendrick's son to be sent to Juvenile Hall. To avoid this, Danny and his dog Scooter run away. Danny joins a gang of kids his age and brags about his father. Scotter is caught by a local dogcatcher leaving Danny heartbroken, leading to him and his gang to attempt to recapture the dog. The rescue fails when one kid fractures his legs and the dogcatcher gasses Scooter.

Danny begs his father to help his kid and to revive Scooter, but Kendrick states he can't do either. Danny goes to Juvenal Hall to turn himself in. Kendrick, Louise, and other doctors restore life to the dog and restore Danny's faith in his father.

== Cast ==
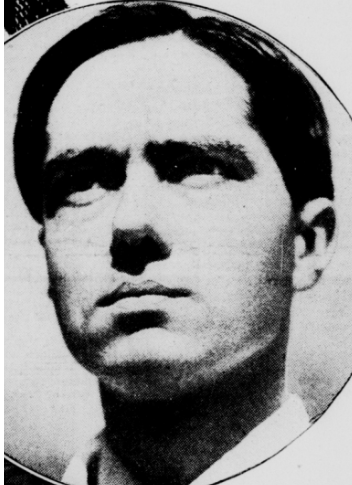
Robert E. Cornish appeared in the film as himself.

Cast adapted from the book Universal Horrors.

- Onslow Stevens as Dr. John Kendrick
- George P. Breakston as Danny Kendrick
- Lois Wilson as Dr. Louise Stone
- Valerie Hobson as Mrs. Kendrick
- Stanley Fields as Dog Catcher
- Frank Reicher as Dr. James
- Richard Carle as A.K. Arnold
- Dean Benton as Interne
- Lois January as Nurse
- Richard Quine as Mickey
- Maidel Turner as Mrs. Vandergriff
- George MacQuarrie as Judge
- Otis Harlan as Dr. Henderson
- Robert E. Cornish as Himself
- Mario Margutti as Cornish's staff
- William Black as Cornish's staff
- Ralph Colmar as Cornish's staff
- Roderic Krider as Cornish's staff

== Production ==
According to news items in Daily Variety, director Eugene Frenke was originally assigned to adapt Leo Tolstoi's novel Father Sergius to the screen, but Universal Pictures was concerned that the subject matter of the story would not be approved by censors, and assigned Frenke to direct an original story.

On May 22, 1934, at the University of Southern California, the scientist Robert E. Cornish succeeded in surgically and chemically restoring life to a dead dog. Eugene Frenke created a film record of the operation and developed a film that would incorporate the footage. Frenke contacting Universal Studios to split costs and profits on the film.

== Release ==
After finishing Life Returns, director Eugene Frenke pressed Universal Studios to make a follow-up film in which a dead man is brought back to life.

The specific release date of Life Returns is unknown. Universal released the film for a special road show run and following a preview screening, Universal pulled the film from a general release and declared the it to be a "freak picture, not suitable for the regular Universal program" Reviews for the film were published between 1934 and 1935, no release date from these years has been confirmed.

In 1937, Frenke brought a $145,424 lawsuit against Universal charging that the studio had not released Life Returns through regular channels. The earliest documented release date is 10 June 1938 where it was distributed by a distributor called Scienart Pictures. The film is the public domain in the United States and has various VHS and DVD releases. Karl Freund contacted Frenke for a print of Life Returns, which led to Frenke to get a new print struck and showed it to his friend. Frenke found out later that Freund asked to view to the film to help him with his own feature Mad Love.

== Reception ==
From contemporary reviews, The Film Daily reviewed the film on January 2, 1935, and stated that the direction on the film was "excellent" and that Onslow Stevens and George Breakston "give fine performances" and the film has "been delicately handled and is not offensive or gruesome." "Barn." of Variety found the film "tedious" and that "every performance is plodding, colorless, and it's a pic much longer to the audience than its accredited running time would indicate." A review in Harrison's Reports stated the film's story was "simple" "and "should appeal more to juveniles than adults" and that "the fault lies with the director; it is slow and stilted."

From retrospective review, the authors of the book Universal Horrors, the authors stated that Life Returns has "a slapdash, slung-together quality that pits it at the level of some of the worst of that era's cheap indie productions - in fact, below that level. It has the low-grade look and feel of a film consisting solely of first takes, good, bad and indifferent."
