= Robert E. Cornish =

American biologist and writer

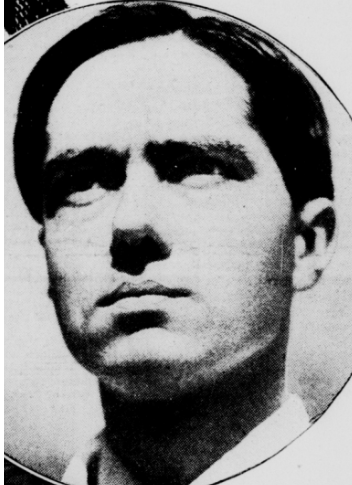
- Born: December 21, 1903; California, United States
- Died: March 6, 1963 (aged 59); Alameda, California
- Occupations: Biologist, writer

Robert Edwin Cornish (December 21, 1903 – March 6, 1963) was an American biologist and writer, best known for his resuscitation experiments.

== Biography ==
Robert Cornish was a child prodigy graduating from the University of California, Berkeley, with honors at the age of 18 and receiving a doctorate by the time he was 22. He worked on various projects including one that allowed for reading newspapers under water with special lenses.

In 1932, he became interested in the idea that he could restore life to the dead. The cornerstone of his plan consisted of a teeterboard or see-saw that was used to get the blood flowing in the recently deceased patients while a mixture of epinephrine (adrenaline) and anticoagulants was injected into their circulatory system.

In 1933, he attempted to revive victims of heart attack, drowning, and electrocution with the teeter board, but had no success. Cornish decided to perfect his method on animals and managed to revive twenty dogs (Lazarus I through XX) clinically put to death (presumably) on May 22, 1934, and in 1935.

As his experiments were successful on his dogs, Cornish wished to expand his clinical trials to include human testing.

San Quentin death-row inmate Thomas McMonigle contacted Cornish, offering his body for possible reanimation following his execution. California law enforcement refused Cornish and McMonigle's petition, due to concerns a reanimated murderer would have to be freed under the "double jeopardy" clause. After denial of the petition, McMonigle was executed in San Quentin's gas chamber on 20 February 1948.

== Selected publications ==
- Vitamin and Mineral Deficiencies (1943)

== In popular media ==
- Robert Cornish played himself in the 1935 film Life Returns, which was based on the story of his experiments.
- The story of his experiments were featured in a 2012 episode of Dark Matters: Twisted But True.
- Travel Channel's Monumental Mysteries presented his experiments in the 08/08/14 episode; the segment was titled, "The Reanimator".
- History.com's The Unbelievable With Dan Aykroyd told the story 31 Jan 2025 (S2E12).
- The 2015 film The Lazarus Effect was based on his experiments.
- The Italian choreographer Fredy Franzutti creates, in 2022 for Balletto del Sud, a choreography entitled Effetto Lazarus, dedicated to the studies of Robert E. Cornish, on the notes of the macabre dance by Camille Saint-Saëns.
