= Robert Webber =

American actor (1924–1989)

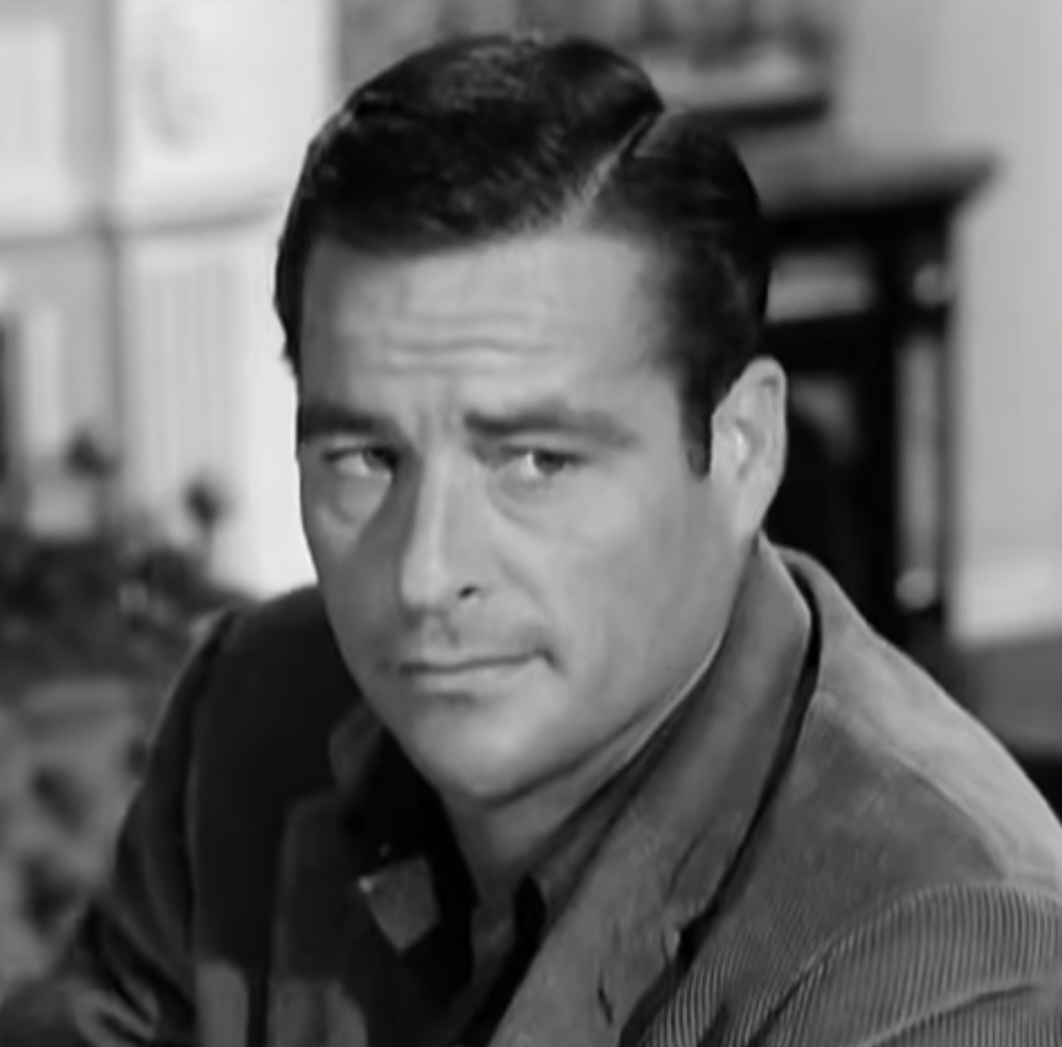
- Webber in an episode of One Step Beyond (1959)
- Born: Robert Laman Webber; October 14, 1924; Santa Ana, California, U.S.
- Died: May 19, 1989 (aged 64); Malibu, California, U.S.
- Other name: Robert Lamar Webber
- Education: Compton College
- Occupation: Actor
- Years active: 1950–1989
- Spouse(s): Miranda Jones (m. 1953; div. 1958) Guindel "Del" Mertens (m. 1972)
- Military career
- Allegiance: United States
- Branch: United States Marine Corps
- Service years: 1943–45
- Rank: Private First Class
- Units: I Marine Amphibious Corps; 6th Marine Division
- Conflicts: World War II; Pacific War; Battle of Guam; Battle of Okinawa

Robert Laman Webber (October 14, 1924 – May 19, 1989) was an American actor. He established himself as a reliable supporting player in a screen career that spanned nearly 50 years, with a “sleek appearance and clenched-jaw look which made him believable as the elegant businessman of sleazy character.” Notable roles include Juror No. 12 in 12 Angry Men (1957) and Brigadier General James Denton in The Dirty Dozen (1967).

== Early life ==
Robert Laman (sometimes spelled Lamar) Webber was born in Santa Ana, California in 1924. His father, also named Robert Webber, was a merchant seaman. He graduated from Oakland Technical High School and Compton College.

=== Military service ===
Webber enlisted in the United States Marine Corps in 1943 during World War II, serving in the 1st Marine Amphibious Corps and later in the 6th Marine Division as a 776-Radio Operator (Low Speed) in Guam and Okinawa. He was discharged in 1945 as a private first class, and he was awarded the Navy Combat Action Ribbon, the Navy Presidential Unit Citation, the American Campaign Medal, the Asiatic-Pacific Campaign Medal, and the World War II Victory Medal.

== Career ==
=== Theatre ===
After his military discharge, Webber hitchhiked to New York City to become an actor. He spent two seasons in summer stock before making his Broadway stage debut in Two Blind Mice, starring Melvyn Douglas. Webber then appeared in The Royal Family, Orpheus Descending, A Loss of Roses, and Period of Adjustment.

=== Film ===
Webber made his film debut as a gangster in Highway 301 (1950).

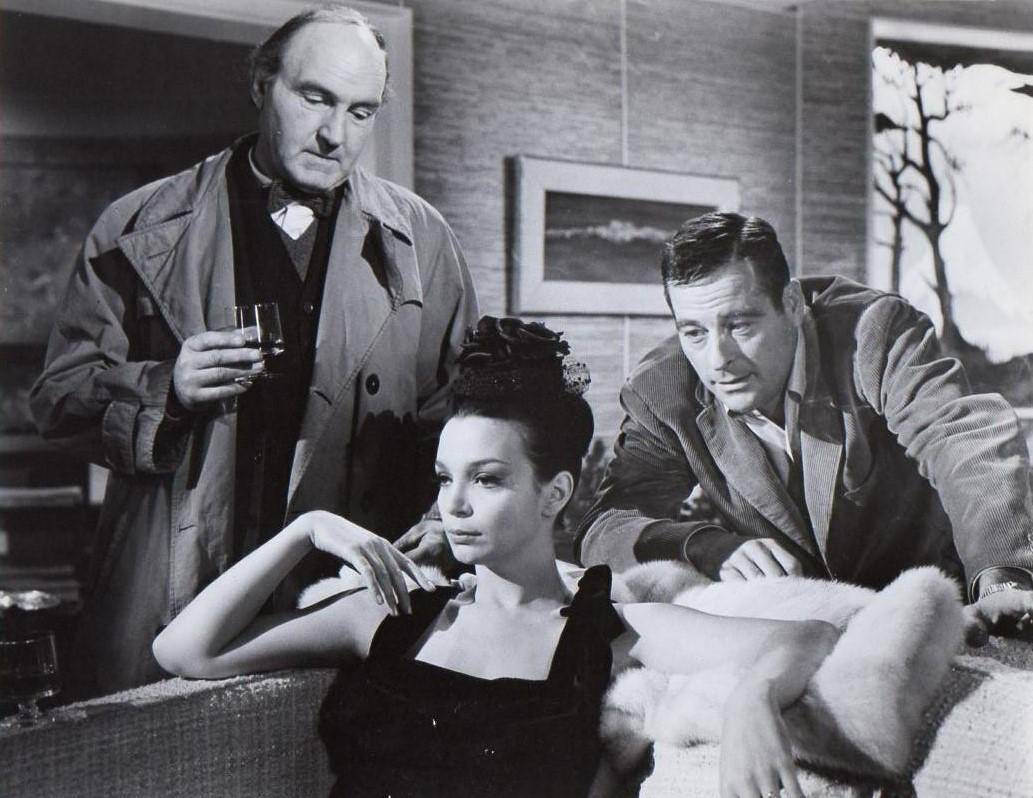
Maurice Denham (left), Lelia Goldoni (center), and Webber (right) in Hysteria (1965).

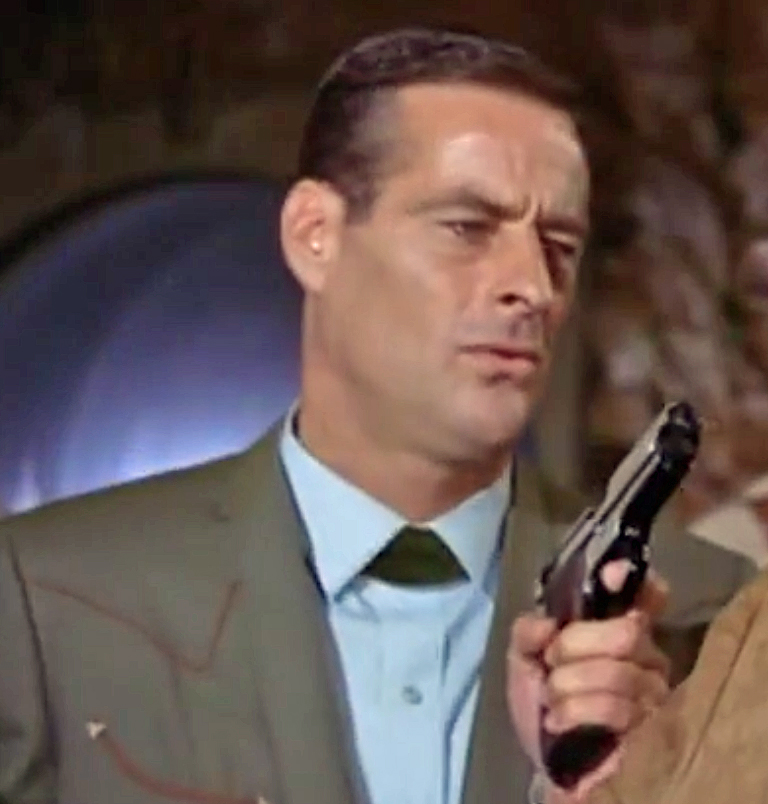
Webber in The Silencers (1966).

On screen, Webber had a 40-year career as a character actor, during which he appeared as Juror No. 12 in 12 Angry Men (1957), as Dudley Moore's gay lyricist in 10 (1979), and the father of Cybill Shepherd's character in the hit series Moonlighting.

Other notable turns were in the movies The Nun and the Sergeant (1962), in which he played the lead; The Sandpiper (1965), in which he played a supporting role as Elizabeth Taylor's character's former lover; a killer in the spy spoof The Silencers (1966); a sadistic lowlife in the neo-noir Harper (1966); The Dirty Dozen (1967); and a hitman in Sam Peckinpah's Bring Me the Head of Alfredo Garcia (1974). Other notable movies include The Great White Hope (1970), Midway (1976), Revenge of the Pink Panther (1978), Private Benjamin (1980), S.O.B. (1981), and Wild Geese II (1985).

He was an frequent collaborator of director Blake Edwards.

=== Television ===
On television, Webber appeared in many of the popular dramas of the time, including Alfred Hitchcock Presents, Mannix, Kojak,The Outer Limits, The Virginian, The Fugitive, Ben Casey, Route 66, I Spy, The Rifleman, Mission: Impossible, S.W.A.T., and Ironside.

He appeared in four episodes of Cannon: the 1971 episode "The Nowhere Man" as McMillan, the 1972 episode "That Was No Lady" as Clay Spencer," the 1973 episode "Memo from a Dead Man" as Barney Shaw, and the 1974 episode "A Voice from the Grave" as the Hitman.

Webber appeared in four episodes of The Rockford Files: the January 1975 episode "Aura Lee, Farewell" as Senator Evan Murdock, the October 1975 episode "The Deep Blue Sleep" as Bob Coleman, the 1976 episode "The Oracle Wore a Cashmere Suit" as Roman Clementi and the episode "Never Send a Boy King to Do a Man's Job" as Harold Jack Coombs.

Webber guest-starred on three episodes of Barnaby Jones: the October 1975 episode “The Price of Terror” as businessman Maxwell Strager and the 1978 two-part episode “Final Judgment” as Gene Gates.

== Personal life ==
Webber married twice, once to actress Miranda Jones.

=== Death ===
Webber died from ALS (Lou Gehrig's disease) on May 19, 1989 in Malibu, California; he was age 64.

== Filmography ==
=== Film ===
- Highway 301 (1950) as William B. Phillips
- 12 Angry Men (1957) as Juror No. 12
- The Nun and the Sergeant (1962) as Sergeant McGrath
- The Stripper (1963) as Ricky Powers
- Hysteria (1965) as Chris Smith
- The Sandpiper (1965) as Ward Hendricks
- The Third Day (1965) as Dom Guardiano
- The Silencers (1966) as Sam Gunther
- Harper (1966) as Dwight Troy
- Tecnica di un omicidio (1966) as Clint Harris
- Dead Heat on a Merry-Go-Round (1966) as Milo Stewart
- The Dirty Dozen (1967) as Brigadier General James Denton
- Don't Make Waves (1967) as Rod Prescott
- Every Man Is My Enemy (1967) as Tony Costa
- Manon 70 (1968) as Ravaggi
- The Big Bounce (1969) as Bob Rodgers
- The Great White Hope (1970) as Dixon
- Macédoine (1971) as Sandeberg
- $ (1971) as Mr. North
- Bring Me the Head of Alfredo Garcia (1974) as Sappensly
- Flatfoot in Hong Kong (1975) as Sam Accardo
- Soldat Duroc, ça va être ta fête (1975) as Sergeant John Lewis
- Midway (1976) as Rear Admiral Frank Jack Fletcher
- Hit Squad (1976) as Mr. Duglas
- Death Steps in the Dark (1977) as Inspector
- Madame Claude (1977) as Howard
- The Accuser aka L'Imprécateur (1977) as Le Cadre Américain
- The Choirboys (1977) as Deputy Chief Riggs
- Casey's Shadow (1978) as Mike Marsh
- Revenge of the Pink Panther (1978) as Philippe Douvier
- Gardenia (1979) as Caruso
- 10 (1979) as Hugh
- Courage - Let's Run (1979) as Charley
- Tous vedettes (1980) as Harry Stabling
- Private Benjamin (1980) as Colonel Clay Thornbush
- Sunday Lovers (1980) as Henry Morrison (segment "The French Method")
- S.O.B. (1981) as Ben Coogan
- Wrong Is Right (1982) as Harvey
- Who Dares Wins (1982) as General Ira Potter
- Wild Geese II (1985) as Robert McCann
- Nuts (1987) as Francis MacMillan

=== Television and radio ===
- Starlight Theatre (1950) as Mike Barry (Season 2, Episode 1: "Welcome Home")
- Out There (1951-1952) as Captain Bill Hurley
- Tales of Tomorrow (1952) (Season 1, Episode 23: "Bound Together")
- Studio One (1952) as Skeets
- Eye Witness (1953) (Season 1, Episode 2: "Apartment 4-D")
- Suspense (1954) as James Forsythe
- Three Steps to Heaven (1953) as Chip Morrison
- Robert Montgomery Presents (1954)
  - (Season 5, Episode 21: "Machinal")
  - (Season 5, Episode 28: "The Paradise Cafe")
  - (Season 5, Episode 38: "Skyblock")
  - (Season 5, Episode 55: "Ten Minute Alibi")
  - (Season 6, Episode 20: "Deadline")
  - as George Lawrence (Season 8, Episode 8: "One Bright Day")
- The Phil Silvers Show (1956) as Ego
- Kraft Television Theatre (1955-1957)
  - (Season 8, Episode 29: "Now, Where Was I?")
  - (Season 10, Episode 36: "All Those Beautiful Girls")
- Playhouse 90 (1958) as Malcolm Field
- The Rifleman (1959) as Wes Carney
- Alfred Hitchcock Presents (1959) as Paul Brett (Season 4, Episode 34: "A True Account")
- Alcoa Presents: One Step Beyond (1959) as Andrew Courtney (Season 1, Episode 19: "The Captain's Guests")
- The Play of the Week (1960) (Season 1, Episode 26: "Palm Tree in a Rose Garden")
- Checkmate (1961) as Miles Archer
- The Investigators (1961) as Bert Crayne
- Thriller (1961) as Arthur Henshaw
- Alfred Hitchcock Presents (1962) as Harrison Fell (Season 7, Episode 21: "Burglar Proof")
- Alfred Hitchcock Presents (1962) as Edward Gibson (Season 7, Episode 36: "First Class Honeymoon")
- The Paradine Case (1962) as Andre Latour
- Stoney Burke (1962) as Roy Hazelton
- The Dick Powell Show (1961-1962) as Captain John Wycliff
- Route 66 (1962) as Frank Bridenbaugh
- The Defenders (1962-1963) as
  - Douglas (Season 1, Episode 19: "Reunion With Death")
  - Michael Hillyer (Season 2, Episode 20: "Ordeal")
  - Father Phelps (Season 3, Episode 9: "The Seal of Confession")
- Naked City (1963) as Gordon Lanning
- The Greatest Show on Earth (1963) as Rudy
- The Nurses (1963) as Arthur Luskin
- Arrest and Trial (1963) as George Morrison
- Bob Hope Presents the Chrysler Theatre (1963) as Stuart Landsman
- Ben Casey (1963) as Slim
- The Fugitive (1964) as Harlan Guthrie
- Espionage (1964) as Jack Hanley
- Brenner (1964) as Eddie Constantinos
- Mr. Broadway (1964) as Hogan
- The Outer Limits (1964) as Ikar (Season 2, Episode 12: "Keeper of the Purple Twilight")
- Kraft Suspense Theatre (1964-1965) as
  - Prosecutor David Henderson (Season 1, Episode 14: "Leviathan Five")
  - Robert Burke (Season 2, Episode 23: "Kill No More")
- The Rogues (1965) as Guy Gabriel
- The Name of the Game (1968) as William McKendricks
- Journey to the Unknown (1969) as Manservant
- Special Branch (1969) as Mr. Snell
- The Bold Ones: The Lawyers (1969) as Sam Rand
- Pontiac "Breakaway" commercial
- The Movie Murderer (1970) as Karel Kessler
- The Men From Shiloh, rebranded name of The Virginian (1970) as Jackson Reed
- San Francisco International Airport (1970) as Brigadier General Goodwin
- Hauser's Memory (1970) as Dorsey
- The Young Lawyers (1971) as Sergeant Fielder
- Mannix (1971) as Tom Carlson
- The Rivals of Sherlock Holmes (1971) as Commissioner of Oaths
- Thief (1971) as James Calendar
- Cutter (1972) as Meredith
- Banacek (1972) as Jerry Brinkman
- Mission: Impossible (1972) as Charles Rogan
- Love, American Style (1972) as Harris (Season 4, Episode 6: "Love and the Confession" segment)
- Banyon (1972) as Waldo
- Search (1973) as Matthew Linden
- Hawkins (1973) as Carl Vincent
- Griff (1973) as Alan Gilbert
- Double Indemnity (1973) as Edward Norton
- The Magician as Zellman
- Tenafly (1973) as Kent
- Kojak (1973) as David Lawrence
- Murder or Mercy (1974) as Dr. Eric Stoneman
- Ironside (1973-1974) as Del Hogan, Burton
- Cannon (1971-1974) as
  - McMillan (Season 1, Episode 13: "Nowhere Man")
  - Clay Spencer (Season 2, Episode 4: "That Was No Lady")
  - Barney Shaw (Season 3, Episode 3: "Memo from a Dead Man")
  - Jake McVea (Season 4, Episode 3: "Voice from the Grave")
- The Manhunter (1974)
- The Streets of San Francisco (1974) as Al Cooper
- McCloud (1971-1975) as
  - Jack Faraday (Season 2, Episode 2: "Top of the World, Ma!")
  - Fritz August (Season 5, Episode 6: "The Man with the Golden Hat")
- Death Stalk (1975) as Hugh Webster
- Switch (1975) as Paul Sinclair
- S.W.A.T. (1975) as
  - McVea (Season 1, Episode 7: "Death Score")
  - Mike Simon (Season 2, Episode 9: "Courthouse")
- Police Woman (1975) as Julian Lord
- McMillan & Wife (1977) as Charles Meridio
- 79 Park Avenue (1977) as John Hackson DeWitt
- Barnaby Jones (1975-1978) as
  - Maxwell Strager (Season 4, Episode 4: "The Price of Terror")
  - Gene Gates (Season 6, Episodes 18 & 19: "Final Judgment")
- The Young Runaways (1978) as Fred Lockhart
- Kaz (1978) (Season 1, Episode 7: "Which Side Are You On?")
- The Rockford Files (1975-1979) as
  - Senator Evan Murdock (Season 1, Episode 14: "Aura Lee, Farewell")
  - Bob Coleman (Season 2, Episode 5: "The Deep Blue Sleep")
  - Roman Clementi (Season 3, Episode 2: "The Oracle Wore a Cashmere Suit")
  - Harold Jack Coombs (Season 5, Episode 19: "Never Send a Boy King to Do a Man's Job")
- Quincy, M.E. (1977-1979) as
  - Dr. John Franklin (Season 2, Episode 12: "Valleyview")
  - Dr. Steven Chase (Season 4, Episode 23: "The Eye of the Needle")
- The Streets of L.A. (1979) as Ralph Salkin
- Tenspeed and Brown Shoe (1980) as LaCrosse
- The Two Lives of Carol Letner (1981) as Ed Leemans
- Darkroom (1981) as Greg Conway
- Bret Maverick (1982) as Everest Sinclair
- Not Just Another Affair (1982) as Professor Wally Dawson (TV movie)
- Don't Go to Sleep (1982) as Dr. Cole (TV movie)
- Starflight: The Plane That Couldn't Land (1983) as Felix Duncan (TV movie)
- Shooting Stars (1983) as Woodrow Norton (TV movie)
- Getting Physical (1984) as Hugh Gibley (TV movie)
- No Man's Land (1984) as Will Blackfield (TV movie)
- Cover Up (1984) as Mason Carter
- Half Nelson (1985) as Arthur Harrison (TV movie)
- In Like Flynn (1985) as Colonel Harper
- Assassin (1986) as Calvin Lantz
- The Ladies (1987) as Jerry
- Moonlighting (1986-1988) as Alexander Hayes
- Something Is Out There (1988) as Commissioner Estabrook
