= Let's Try Again =

1934 film by Worthington Miner

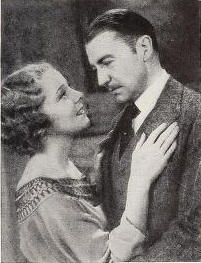
- Helen Vinson and Clive Brook
- Directed by: Worthington Miner
- Written by: Worthington Miner (adaptation)
- Based on: Sour Grapes by Vincent Lawrence
- Starring: Clive Brook; Diana Wynyard; Helen Vinson
- Cinematography: J. Roy Hunt
- Music by: Max Steiner
- Distributed by: RKO Radio Pictures
- Release date: July 6, 1934
- Running time: 67 min.; 7 reels
- Country: United States
- Language: English
- Box office: $183,000

Let's Try Again is a 1934 American melodrama film starring Clive Brook. It was known in Britain as Marriage Symphony.

It earned $183,000 at the box office at a time when a film of its budget was expected to earn $250,000.

== Cast ==
- Diana Wynyard as Alice Overton
- Clive Brook as Dr. Jack Overton
- Helen Vinson as Nan Blake
- Irene Hervey as Marge Phelps
- Theodore Newton as Paul Milburn
- Arthur Hoyt as Phillips, the Butler
- Henry Kolker as Mr. Blake
