= Dovzhenko =

Dovzhenko (Ukrainian: Довженко) is a Ukrainian surname derived from the adjective довгий ("long").

The surname is used by the following people:

- Alexander Dovzhenko (1894–1956), Soviet-Ukrainian film director
- Alexander Dovzhenko (1918–1995), Soviet-Ukrainian psychiatrist
- Grigoriy Dovzhenko (1899–1980), Ukrainian muralist
- Olexandr Dovzhenko, Ukrainian poker player
- Sergei Dovzhenko (born 1972), Ukrainian serial killer
- Tetiana Dovzhenko (born 2002), Ukrainian rhythmic gymnast

== See also ==
- Dovzhenko Film Studios
- Dolzhenko
- Dolzhenkov
