= Charles Shaw (writer) =

Australian journalist and novelist (1900–1955)

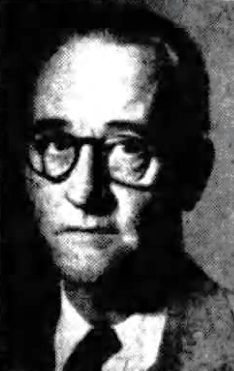
- Born: 10 August 1900; Melbourne, Victoria, Australia
- Died: 1 August 1955 (aged 54); Sydney, New South Wales, Australia
- Occupation: author
- Spouse: Phoebe McLachlan (m. 1932)
- Children: 2
- Writing career
- Pen name: Bant Singer
- Genres: Australia, war, detective fiction
- Notable work: Heaven Knows, Mr. Allison

Charles Herbert Shaw (10 August 1900 – 1 August 1955) was an Australian journalist and novelist.

== Life and career ==
Shaw was born in South Melbourne, Victoria. Shaw was the eldest of six children. Shaw's family moved to north-western Victoria when he was a boy, but his parents died when he was in his early teens. When Shaw was 13, his father died. A year later, Shaw's mother died in a drowning accident in the Murray River.

After his parents deaths, Shaw worked various jobs including on sheep stations and in vineyards. He also worked as a farmhand, as a post hole digger, as a trapper, as a boundary rider and as a shearer. Returning to Melbourne, Shaw worked as a vacuum cleaner salesman and with a taxation office which Shaw later admitted he "conceived a long and lasting hatred for the civil service."

Working a variety of jobs during the Depression years he held a variety of jobs, his interest in writing led him to work at The Western Sun in Forbes, New South Wales. Shaw described this job as setting his foot on the ladder where he "wrote madly" on the variety of stories he would cover, stating: "In one day, I might cover a Methodist tea party, watch a body being dragged from the river and listen to a council row."

Shaw married schoolteacher Phoebe Matilda "Maxie" McLachlan on 18 January 1932 at the Presbyterian Church in the Sydney suburb of Auburn.

After working for the Farmer and Settler and contributing stories to The Bulletin, he was eventually put on the staff at The Bulletin as a rural editor after as a means by the editor to dissuade Shaw from relocating to Queensland.

He had two collections of outback short stories, Outback Occupations (1943) and A Sheaf of Shorts (1944), and one volume of verse The Warrumbungle Mare (1943) published as well as two detective stories The Green Token (1943) and Treasure of the Hills (1944). Shaw decided after several rejections that no one outside Australia had an interest in stories about the outback as the topic was "too parochial" to hold the interest of readers outside of Australia.

Shaw wrote the novel, Heaven Knows, Mr. Allison, published in 1952, about a U.S. Marine and a nun on a Japanese-held Pacific island. It was adapted for the screen as a 1957 film with the screenplay written by John Huston and John Lee Mahin, with Huston directing. The film starring Deborah Kerr and Robert Mitchum was nominated for an Academy Award for Best Writing, Screenplay Based on Material from Another Medium in at the 30th Academy Awards in 1958, with Kerr also nominated for Best Actress.

After the success of Heaven Knows, Mr. Allison, Shaw's publishers asked him to begin using a pen name as they thought readers of Heaven Knows, Mr. Allison may be disillusioned if they discovered Shaw had turned to fictional violence in a series of four detective 'Delaney' novels featuring the character Dennis Delaney. Shaw chose the nom de plume of "Bant Singer", named after his favourite car, a Singer Bantam.

- You're Wrong, Delaney (1953)
- Don't Slip, Delaney (1954)
- Have Patience, Delaney (1954)
- Your Move, Delaney (1956)

== Death ==
He died of a cerebral haemorrhage in Sydney on 1 August 1955. He left a widow and two sons.
