= Let's Live a Little (film) =

1948 film by Richard Wallace

- Theatrical release poster
- Directed by: Richard Wallace
- Screenplay by: Howard Irving Young; Edmund L. Hartmann
- Story by: Albert J. Cohen; Jack Harvey
- Produced by: Robert Cummings; Eugene Frenke
- Starring: Hedy Lamarr; Robert Cummings; Anna Sten
- Cinematography: Ernest Laszlo
- Edited by: Arthur Hilton
- Music by: Werner R. Heymann
- Production company: United California Productions
- Distributed by: Eagle-Lion Films
- Release date: December 9, 1948 (USA)
- Running time: 85 minutes
- Country: United States
- Language: English
- Budget: $1.5 million or $1 million

Let's Live a Little is a 1948 American romantic comedy film directed by Richard Wallace and starring Hedy Lamarr, Robert Cummings and Anna Sten. Written by Howard Irving Young, Edmund L. Hartmann, Albert J. Cohen, and Jack Harvey, the film is about an overworked advertising executive who is being pursued romantically by his former fiancée, a successful perfume magnate, who is also the ad agency's largest client. While visiting a new client—a psychiatrist and author—to discuss a proposed ad campaign, his life becomes further complicated when the new client turns out to be a beautiful woman, who decides to treat his nervous condition.

== Plot ==
At Montgomery Advertising in New York City, Duke Crawford (Robert Cummings) is having trouble handling the account of cosmetics manufacturer Michele Bennett (Anna Sten), one of the company's most important clients—and his former fiancée. Still determined to win him back, Michele refuses to sign a contract until Duke reciprocates her affection. When Duke threatens to quit Michele's account, his boss James Montgomery (Harry Antrim) assigns him to do the book promotion for a new client, a nerve psychologist named J.O. Loring.

While taking a taxi to the psychologist's office, Duke shaves with an electric razor he invented, but his nervousness and stress result in leaving half his mustache intact. When he arrives at the client's office, Duke discovers that J.O. Loring is in fact an attractive woman named Jo (Hedy Lamarr). Staring at the half a mustache, Jo mistakes him for one of her mentally disturbed patients. Determines to prove to himself that he is anesthetized from women, he kisses the doctor. Jo reacts by recommending that he read her book on stress relief titled Let's Live a Little. Later that night, Duke is unable to fall asleep.

The next morning, after Duke makes an appointment to see Jo as her patient, Jo advises him that if he wants his former fiancée to sign the contract, he must wine and dine her. Following her advice, Duke arranges a date with Michele at a nightclub. Wanting to observe the encounter for scientific reasons, Jo arrives at the nightclub with her stuffy surgeon boyfriend, Dr. Richard Field (Robert Shayne). When Michele notices that Duke and Jo are falling in love, and when she is served a cake with an advertising contract inside instead of a marriage license, she throws his drink at him and storms out of the nightclub. Duke is reduced to a nerve-wracked state—repeating ad slogans over and over.

Feeling responsible for Duke's psychological condition, Jo takes him to a lakeside lodge for a rest cure. One moonlit night, while the two are on the lake in a canoe, Duke kisses Jo passionately, proving to himself that he is cured of his misogyny. Duke soon returns to New York, rejuvenated by his love for Jo, and organizes a successful radio ad campaign for her book. During one radio interview, Jo discusses one of her recent patients who suffered from a nervous breakdown brought on by a failed relationship. She describes how she helped him recover by pretending to fall in love with him to help him in a transference of his affections. When Duke hears the interview, he becomes angry at being depicted as a guinea pig in a love experiment. Duke resolves to forget Jo and pursue Michele.

Soon after, Jo reads the newspaper announcement of Duke's engagement to Michele. Unable to think about anything but Duke, Jo begins to have a nervous breakdown of her own. As Michele and Duke's wedding day approaches, Jo's colleague Dr. Field takes her to the lakeside lodge in an effort to cure her of her obsession with Duke. Even after he proposes to her, however, she can see only Duke's face, and rejects him. Meanwhile, as Michele tastelessly redecorates Duke's apartment, he gets a telephone call from Field, who defiantly announces that Jo is now in his care. Duke leaves Michele and drives to the lakeside lodge, where he finds Jo, embraces her, and convinces her that his kisses are real.

== Cast ==
- Hedy Lamarr as Dr. J.O. Loring
- Robert Cummings as Duke Crawford
- Anna Sten as Michele Bennett
- Robert Shayne as Dr. Richard Field
- Mary Treen as Miss Adams
- Harry Antrim as James Montgomery
- Norma Varden as Nurse Brady
- Byron Foulger as Mr. Hopkins
- Virginia Farmer as Mrs. Harris
- Lucien Littlefield as Mr. Tinker
- Billy Bevan as Morton
- Jay Eaton as Mr. Fetherstone
- John Dehner as Dempster
- Regina Wallace as Mrs. Lansworth
- Lillian Randolph as Sarah
- Joseph Granby as Newcomb
- Frank Marlowe as Taxi Driver
- Curt Bois as Chemist
- Kathleen O'Malley as Model

== Production ==
Let's Live a Little was the first film produced by Robert Cummings and Eugene Frenke, and the company formed by Robert Cummings, Philip Yordan and Eugene Frenke, United California Productions (UCP). Hedy Lamarr signed in December 1947.

UCP originally arranged for the film to be financed and released through United Artists but this was eventually terminated and they made a deal instead with a new company, Eagle-Lion.

UCP had Douglas Sirk under contract as director but because he was busy on another film they hired Richard Wallace to direct Let's Live a Little.

Anna Sten was married to Eugene Frenke.

Filming took place in March 1948. According to an article, the film cost $1,100,000 to produce.

Stanley Cortez was meant to be cinematographer but left the film during filming. It was reported in the trade press this was because Lamarr objected to the focus being given to Anna Sten over her. Hedy Lamarr said it was because she was unhappy with his work. Frencke said it was because Cortez was sick.

Cummings announced a slate of independent productions to follow, Joe MacBeth, The Glass Heart, and Bad Guy, but was unable to obtain financing.

== Radio Version ==
A radio version of the film was broadcast on Screen Directors' Playhouse on January 16, 1949 and starred Robert Cummings and Betty Lou Gerson. The film was later reissued in the United States with the title Hell Breaks Loose.

== Reception ==
Let's Live a Little received mixed reviews, with most critics reserving their positive responses for Lamarr. Following the previews on October 21, 1948, the reviewer in Daily Variety wrote, "Lamarr is a knockout!" In his review for the Los Angeles Times, Philip K. Scheuer wrote, "Miss Lamarr is her customary self—vague, cool, and bewitching." Filmink called it "terrible".

Despite earning some money, Let's Live a Little turned out to be the only film ever produced by United California Productions. For the film itself, most of the positive responses were far more reserved. The reviewer for the Hollywood Reporter wrote, "The not too discriminating filmgoer might reasonably find it much to his liking." In New South Wales, Australia, the film was double billed with Tokyo File 212.
