= Second Hand Wife =

1933 film by Hamilton MacFadden

- Theatrical release poster
- Directed by: Hamilton MacFadden
- Screenplay by: Hamilton MacFadden
- Based on: Second Hand Wife by Kathleen Norris
- Starring: Sally Eilers; Helen Vinson; Ralph Bellamy; Victor Jory
- Cinematography: Charles G. Clarke
- Edited by: Alex Troffey
- Music by: Hugo Friedhofer; George Lipschultz
- Production company: Fox Film Corporation
- Distributed by: Fox Film Corporation
- Release date: January 8, 1933
- Running time: 70 minutes
- Country: United States
- Language: English

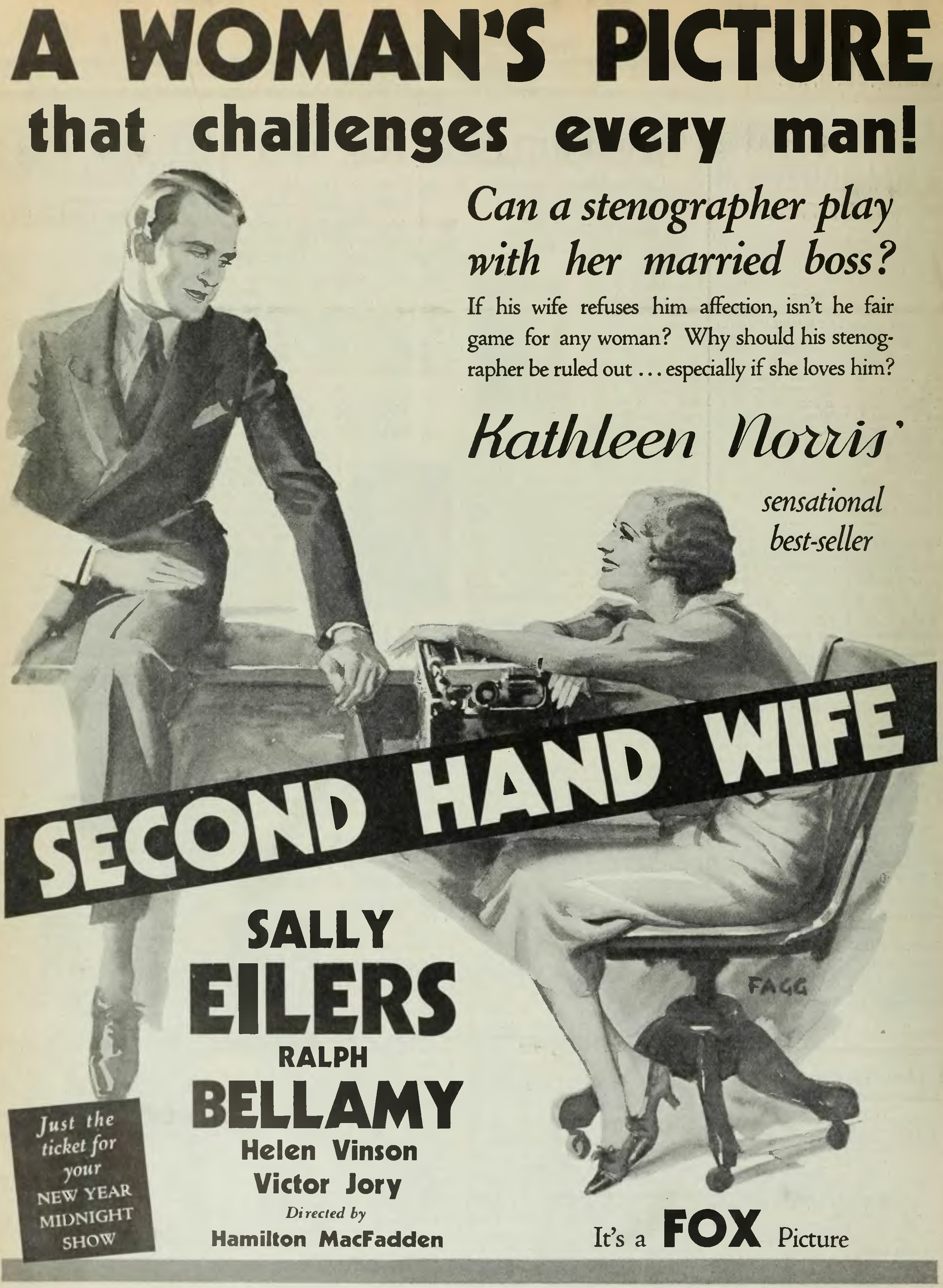
Movie ad from The Film Daily, 1932

Second Hand Wife is a 1933 American pre-Code drama film written and directed by Hamilton MacFadden. The film stars Sally Eilers, Helen Vinson, Ralph Bellamy, and Victor Jory. The film was released on January 8, 1933, by Fox Film Corporation.

== Plot ==
At Cavendish and Bartlett secretary Sandra Trumbull is becoming infatuated with the vice-president, Carter Cavendish. When Carter's regular secretary is ill Sandra is sent to the Cavendish house, where Carter is recovering from an injury. Carter's wife, Betty, discusses matters with their daughter Patsy's violin teacher, Lotzi Vadja. Betty and Lotzi are having an affair, and Lotzi wants Betty and Patsy to move to Paris with him, so that he can be with Betty, plus mentor Patsy, who is a child prodigy.

Betty persuades Carter to allow her to go to Paris with their daughter, to further Patsy's music skills. Betty encourages her husband to become romantic with secretary Sandra. Carter rejects that idea, but later becomes attracted to Sandra's pleasant personality. Though they both have feelings for each other Carter and Sandra keep their relationship caste. Carter organizes a golf tournament in another city, and Sandra goes along to help him. Carter tells Sandra that he plans to divorce his wife, and hopes that he and Betty can share custody of Patsy. Betty hires a detective, who finds Carter in Sandra's hotel room. Nothing improper was happening but Betty threatens to cause everyone to think a scandal has taken place unless Carter gives her full custody of Patsy. Carter chooses Sandra over custody of his daughter and, after the divorce, he and Sandra have a quiet wedding. During the honeymoon Patsy is injured and Carter rushes off to be with his daughter. Later on Sandra gives birth to a daughter who only lives for a few hours.

Patsy becomes a world-famous violinist. Carter goes to a performance and sees his daughter for the first time in years. Patsy states she doesn't want to return to Paris, for Lotzi treats her harshly. Sandra tells Betty she knows that Betty changed dates on court papers, she is not legally divorced, and Sandra is willing to expose her wrongdoing if Carter is not allowed custody of his child. Betty gives up custody of Patsy, and works on obtaining a legal divorce. Sandra stays with her mother until she can remarry Carter after the divorce officially becomes final. Afterwards Carter, Sandra, and Patsy go on vacation together.

== Cast ==
- Sally Eilers as Sandra Trumbull
- Helen Vinson as Betty Cavendish
- Ralph Bellamy as Carter Cavendish
- Victor Jory as Lotzi Vajda
- Nella Walker as Mrs. Cavendish
