= Heaven Knows, Mr. Allison (novel) =

1952 novel by Charles Shaw

- First edition
- Author: Charles Shaw
- Language: English
- Genre: War novel
- Publisher: Crown
- Publication date: 1952
- Publication place: Australia
- Media type: Print (hardback & paperback)
- ISBN: 9785510895186; Book On Demand Ltd, 2012
- OCLC: 1816343

Heaven Knows, Mr. Allison is a 1952 novel by Australian writer Charles Shaw. It tells the story of U.S. Marine Corporal Allison shipwrecked on an island in the Pacific during World War II. The only inhabitant is a nun, Sister Angela. It was made into a 1957 film of the same name by John Huston.

== Plot summary ==
The narrative deals with the developing relationship between the Marine and the nun, especially Allison's growing attraction to Sister Angela.

The novel is set earlier in the war than the film, with Allison escaping from the Battle of Corregidor at the time that the Allies are still on the defensive in the Pacific.

== Characters in Heaven Knows, Mr. Allison ==
- Allison – the Marine
- Sister Angela – the nun

== Film adaptation ==
The movie was adapted by John Huston and John Lee Mahin from the novel and directed by Huston. Deborah Kerr was nominated for the Academy Award for Best Actress in a Leading Role. Robert Mitchum played Allison.
