= Dolzhenkov =

Dolzhenkov, feminine: Dolzhenkova is a Russian-language surname. Notable people with the surname include:

- Oleksandr Dolzhenkov (born 1983), Ukrainian lawyer and politician
- Vasily Dolzhenkov (1842–1918), Russian medical doctor ad politician

== See also ==
- Dovzhenko
