= They Came to Blow Up America =

1943 film by Edward Ludwig

- Directed by: Edward Ludwig
- Written by: Aubrey Wisberg
- Based on: story by Michael Jacoby (as Michel Jacoby)
- Produced by: Lee S. Marcus
- Starring: George Sanders; Anna Sten
- Cinematography: Lucien Andriot
- Edited by: Nick DeMaggio
- Music by: Hugo Friedhofer; Leigh Harline; Arthur Lange
- Production company: 20th Century Fox
- Distributed by: 20th Century Fox
- Release date: May 7, 1943
- Running time: 73 minutes
- Country: United States
- Language: English

They Came to Blow Up America, also known as School for Sabotage and School for Saboteurs, is a 1943 American war spy film directed by Edward Ludwig and starring George Sanders and Anna Sten. It is based on the World War II Operation Pastorius.

== Plot ==
When only six of eight would-be German saboteurs are sentenced to death by an American court during World War II, an FBI agent complains to his boss, Craig (Ward Bond), about the other two. Craig tells him about one of the men sentenced to prison. A flashback ensues.

American attorney Carl Steelman (Sanders) stuns his German-born parents by telling them that he is a member of the German American Bund. His father (Ludwig Stössel), a loyal American, is particularly incensed. When Carl attends a Bund meeting, his colleague Ernst Reiter divulges that he has been called back to Germany to be trained as a saboteur. The police break up the meeting; fleeing, Reiter draws a gun and is shot dead. Later, Carl meets with Craig; Carl is actually an FBI undercover agent. Craig informs him that he is to impersonate Reiter and infiltrate the school.

In Hamburg, Carl becomes friendly with a woman named Helga Lorenz. Later, Colonel Taeger (Dennis Hoey) informs him that Helga is suspected of being in the German Underground, and orders him to continue seeing her to find incriminating evidence. After Carl accidentally finds some anti-Nazi leaflets, he warns Helga, but a spy with a telescope has witnessed this, so Carl has no choice but to denounce her himself. When she refuses to talk, Taeger orders her sent to a concentration camp. Carl manages to intercept the car taking her away and rescue her.

Then Reiter's wife shows up at his hotel. To prevent her from betraying him, he tells her that Reiter was captured in America, then asks her for a day to explain himself. He then tells Colonel Taeger that his "wife" has lost her mind. After questioning the woman himself, the colonel agrees and has her sent to an asylum.

When Carl's father becomes seriously ill, Craig tells him about his son's real mission, but stresses he can divulge the information to no one, not even his wife. Julius is too overjoyed to obey. He tells his close friend, Dr. Herman Holger (Sig Ruman).

Because of his excellent performance at the sabotage school, Carl is put in charge of the first group of saboteurs to be sent to America after the United States enters the war. He and three others board a U-boat. When Colonel Taeger is notified that a Carl Steelman is an American agent, he goes to see Frau Reiter; she confirms that Steelman was her husband's associate in America. Taeger has her shot to cover up his mistake, then sends an urgent message to the U-boat captain.

The submarine is attacked by American bombers, but escapes unharmed, and the saboteurs depart in a life raft before Taeger's message is received. Then the bomb Carl left aboard blows up, sending the submerged U-boat to the bottom. Ashore, the four men are spotted on the beach and arrested. Craig makes Carl maintain his cover and turn state's evidence against the others, as well as four saboteurs sent to Florida.

Then Carl goes home to see his parents and Dr. Holger. He informs Holger that he has a list of German agents in America, and that the doctor is on it at number eight. He takes Holger away.

== Cast ==
- George Sanders as Carl Steelman / "Ernst Reiter"
- Anna Sten as Frau Reiter
- Ward Bond as FBI Chief Craig
- Dennis Hoey as Colonel Taeger
- Sig Ruman as Dr. Herman Holger
- Ludwig Stössel as Julius Steelman, Carl's father
- Robert Barrat as Captain Kranz, head of the sabotage school
- Liesl Handl as Helga Lorenz
- Ralph Byrd as Burkhardt, second saboteur with Steelman
- Elsa Janssen as Henrietta Steelman (as Else Janssen), Carl's mother
- Wolfgang Zilzer as Schlegel
