= Girl in the Case (1934 film) =

1934 film directed by Eugene Frenke

- Directed by: Eugene Frenke
- Written by: J. Hoganoff; Eugene Frenke
- Starring: Jimmy Savo; Eddie Lambert; Dorothy Darling
- Cinematography: Arthur Martinelli
- Edited by: Charles Hunt
- Music by: Sam K. Winland; Oliver Wallace
- Production companies: DuWorld Pictures; Screenart Productions
- Release date: March 15, 1934 (US)
- Running time: 60 minutes
- Country: United States
- Language: English

Girl in the Case is a 1934 American romantic comedy film. Directed by Eugene Frenke, the film tars Jimmy Savo, Eddie Lambert, and Dorothy Darling. It was released on March 15, 1934.

== Cast list ==
- Jimmy Savo
- Eddie Lambert
- Dorothy Darling
- Arthur Loft
- Si Jenks
- M. Ivanoff
- Arthur Thallassoff Schultz
