= Olexandr Dovzhenko (poker player) =

Ukrainian poker player

Oleksandr Dovzhenko
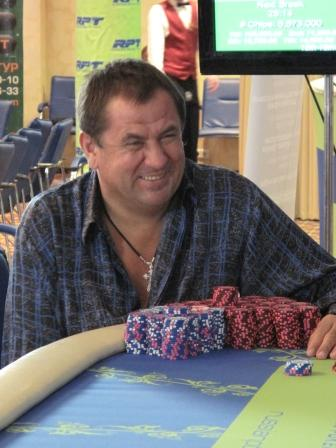
- Dovzhenko at the 2010 RPT Event

World Series of Poker
- Bracelet: None
- Money finishes: 11

World Poker Tour
- Money finish: 1

European Poker Tour
- Final table: 1
- Money finishes: 2

Oleksandr Dovzhenko is a Ukrainian professional poker player. Dovzhenko has played professionally from the late 1990s. In 2009 he was second at European Poker Tour event in Kyiv. He won the Mediterranean Poker Cup in Cyprus (2010), was a finalist in the Russian Poker Tour, and was at the final table of Casinos Austria Poker Tour in Baden (2010).

He was the third-place finisher at Partouche Poker Tour side event (2010). In January 2011, Dovzhenko was a captain of Ukrainian National Team in World Cup of Poker.

Appeared at second season of poker TV show Russian Fight on REN TV.

As of 2011, his total live tournament winnings exceed $1,000,000.
