= A Woman Alone (1936 film) =

1936 film by Eugene Frenke

- Swedish film poster
- Directed by: Eugene Frenke
- Written by: Warren Chetham Strode; Léo Lania; Fedor Ozep
- Produced by: Robert Garrett; Otto Klement
- Starring: Anna Sten; Henry Wilcoxon; Viola Keats; John Garrick
- Cinematography: Jack E. Cox
- Edited by: Winifred Cooper
- Music by: Karol Rathaus
- Release date: 20 May 1936
- Running time: 78 minutes
- Country: United Kingdom
- Language: English
- Budget: £80,000

A Woman Alone, also released as Two Who Dared, is a 1936 British drama film directed by Eugene Frenke and starring Anna Sten, Henry Wilcoxon and Viola Keats.

== Plot ==
An officer becomes entangled in a love affair with a woman. A star-crossed love affair unfolds in 19th-century czarist Russia between peasant Maria Krasnova and military captain Nicolai Ilyinski.

== Cast ==
- Anna Sten as Maria
- Henry Wilcoxon as Capt. Nicolai Ilyinski
- Viola Keats as Olga Ilyinski
- John Garrick as Yakov Sharialev
- Romilly Lunge as Lt. Tuzenback
- Esmé Percy as General Petroff
- Francis L. Sullivan as Prosecutor
- Guy Middleton as Alioshka
- Peter Gawthorne as President of Court Martial
- Frank Atkinson as Porter
- Minnie Rayner as Lousha
- Pat Noonan as Sergeant

== Critical reception ==
The Film Daily commented that this British made film "will find little appeal for American audiences. The story is tediously handled in the writing and the direction, and smacks of many others that have been written around the theme of the poor girl aspiring to love with a member of the aristocracy."
