= Anna Sten =

Russian-American actress (1908–1993)

- Анна Стен
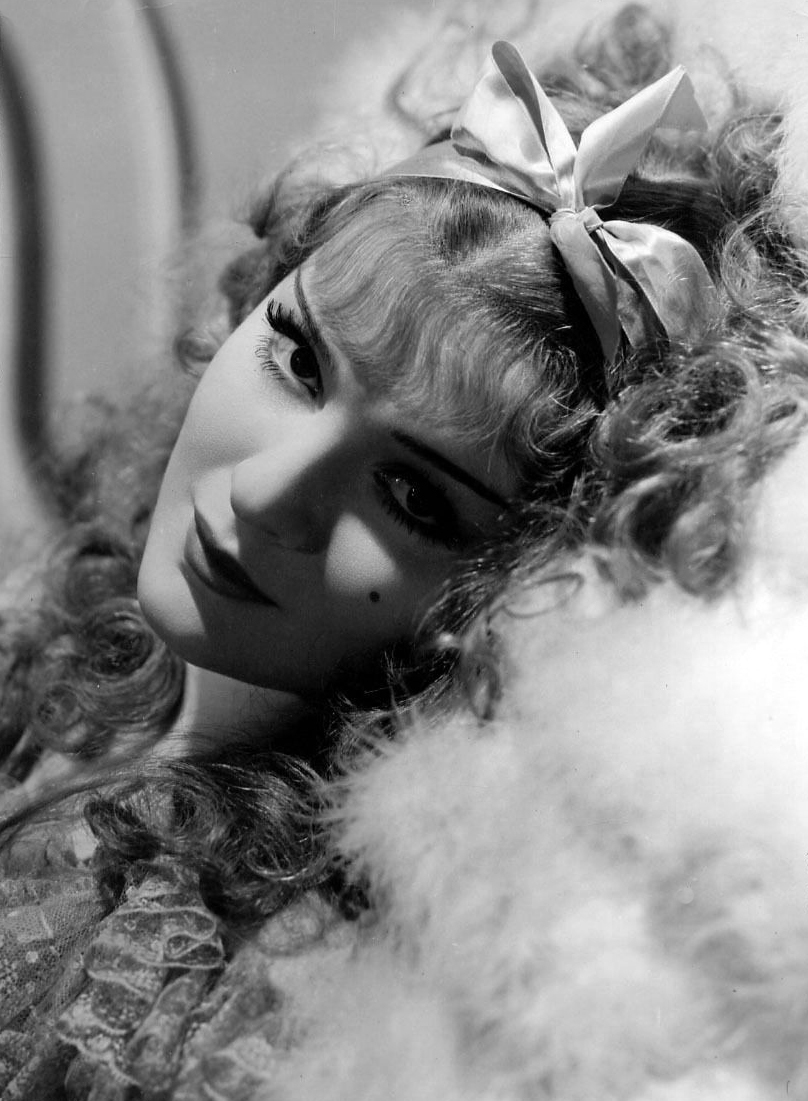
- Sten in 1934
- Born: Anna Petrovna Fesak; December 3, 1908 (Note: Subject to dispute. See § Early life and education.); Kiev, Russian Empire
- Died: November 12, 1993 (aged 84); New York City, U.S.
- Occupation: Actress
- Years active: 1926–1964
- Spouse(s): Boris Sten Fedor Ozep (m. 1927–1931) Eugene Frenke (m. 1932–1984)

Anna Sten (Note: Russian: Анна Стен, romanized: Anna Sten) (born Anna Petrovna Fesak or Fisakova; (Note: Russian: Анна Петровна Фесак, romanized: Anna Petrovna Fesak) December 3, 1908 – November 12, 1993) was a Ukrainian-born Ukrainian-American actress. She began her career in stage plays and films in the Soviet Union, then traveled to Germany, where she starred in several films. Her performances were noticed by film producer Samuel Goldwyn, who brought her to the United States with the aim of creating a screen personality to rival Greta Garbo. After a few unsuccessful films, Goldwyn released her from her contract. She continued to act occasionally until her final film appearance in 1962.

== Early life and education ==
Sten was born on December 3, 1908, in Kiev in the Russian Empire (present-day Ukraine). According to her own words, she was born on June 29, 1908. There are other sources that say she was born in 1910. Her father was a ballet master of Ukrainian Cossack descent, and her Swedish-born mother a ballerina. Some sources say her father died during the First World War and Anna worked to support her mother, while according to other sources, her father survived the war, found his daughter, and toured Russia with his circus troupe. In her own words, she adopted her mother's maiden name; according to the children of her friends, her birth name was Anna Petrovna Fisakova.

In most foreign sources, her maiden names are Stenska and Sudakevich, or a combination thereof (such as a common variant Anel [Anyushka] Stenska-Sudakevich or Annel [Anjuschka] Stenskaja Sudakewitsch), which is why Sten has been mistakenly identified with the Russian actress Anel Sudakevich, who starred in Soviet cinema at the same time and with some of the same directors as Anna Sten.

As a teenager, Anna worked for the Kievskaya Pravda newspaper and received her education at Kiev State Theater College. In Kiev, she married the artist Boris Sten (Bernstein). After she later moved to Moscow, her relation with her husband Boris was severed, who died on April 29, 1936, from peritonitis. It is unknown whether Anna's stage name was borrowed from her husband or derived from her mother's maiden name.

== Career ==
In 1926, after completing her studies at Kiev, Sten was invited by Ukrainian film director Viktor Turin to appear in his film Provokator. (Note: A newly restored version of Viktor Turin's film Provokator was shown at the Silent Films Festival in Pordenone, Italy in October 2012.) Her first mentor was Boris Barnet. Sten was discovered by the Russian stage director and instructor Konstantin Stanislavsky, who arranged an audition for her at the Moscow Film Academy. Sten went on to act in other plays and films, including Boris Barnet's comedy The Girl with a Hatbox (1927). She and her husband, Russian film director Fedor Ozep, traveled to Germany to appear in a film co-produced by German and Soviet studios, The Yellow Ticket (1928).

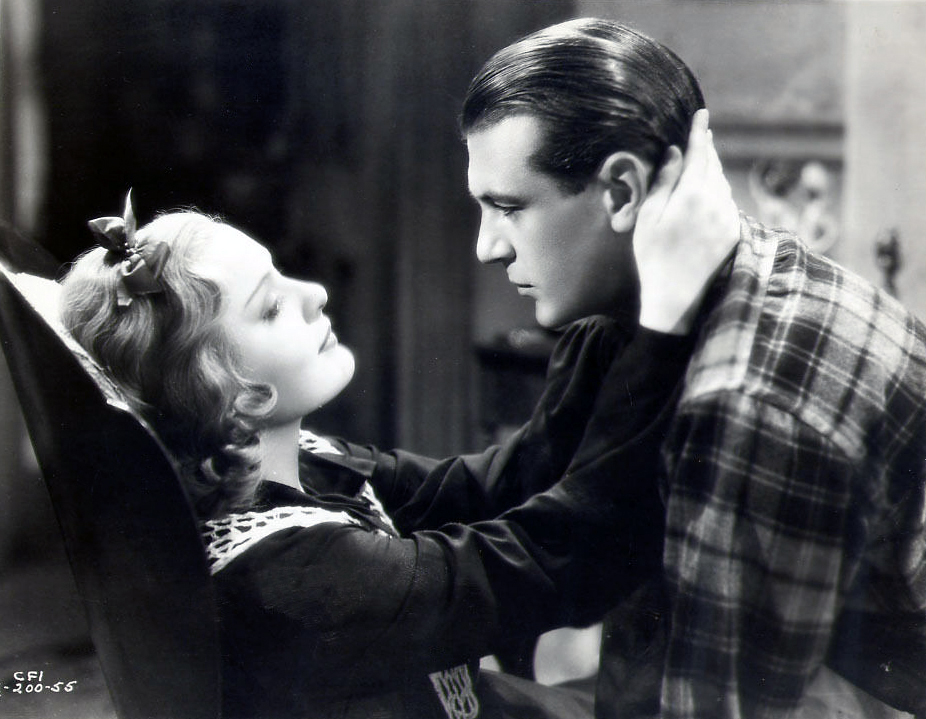
Gary Cooper and Anna Sten publicity photo for The Wedding Night, 1935

Making a smooth transition to talking pictures, Sten appeared in such German films as Salto Mortale (1931) and The Murderer Dimitri Karamazov (1931) until she came to the attention of American movie mogul Samuel Goldwyn. Goldwyn was looking for a foreign-born actress that he could develop as a rival to Greta Garbo and possible successor to Vilma Bánky, with whom Goldwyn had great success in the silent era. For two years after bringing Sten to the U.S., Goldwyn had her tutored in English and taught Hollywood screen acting methods. He poured a great deal of time and money into Nana (1934), Sten's first American film, a diluted version of Émile Zola's 19th-century novel. The film was not successful at the box office nor were her two subsequent Goldwyn films We Live Again (1934) and The Wedding Night (1935). Reluctantly, Goldwyn dissolved his contract with his "new Garbo". Goldwyn's tutoring of Sten is mentioned in Cole Porter's 1934 song "Anything Goes" from the musical of the same name: "When Sam Goldwyn can with great conviction / Instruct Anna Sten in diction / Then Nana shows / Anything goes."

In the 1940s, Sten appeared in several films, including The Man I Married (1940), So Ends Our Night (1941), Chetniks! The Fighting Guerrillas (1943), They Came to Blow Up America (1943), Three Russian Girls (1943), and Let's Live a Little (1948). Sten continued making films in the United States and England, but none were successful. Attempting to rectify this situation by studying at The Actors Studio, Sten appeared in several television series during the 1950s, including The Red Skelton Show (1956), The Walter Winchell File (1957), and Adventures in Paradise (1959).

== Later life ==
Most of Sten's later film appearances were favors to her husband. She had an uncredited bit in the Frenke-produced Heaven Knows, Mr. Allison (1957) and a full lead in The Nun and the Sergeant (1962), her final film (also produced by Frenke).

== Personal life ==
Sten was married to film producer Eugene Frenke. Sten's daughter Anya was a student at the Monticello School, Los Angeles in the early 1930s.

Sten died November 12, 1993, in New York City at the age of 84.

== Filmography ==
Films
Year	Title	Role	Notes
1926	Predatel	Prostitute	
1926	Miss Mend	Typist	uncredited, The Adventures of the Three Reporters
1927	The Girl with a Hatbox	Natasha	Moscow That Weeps and Laughs; Devushka s korobkoy
1928	The Yellow Ticket	Maria	
1928	My Son	Olga Surina	
1928	The White Eagle	Governor's wife	
1928	Yego kar'yera	Lipa student	
1929	Golden Beak	Varenka	
1930	Bookkeeper Kremke	Kremke's daughter	
1931	The Murderer Dimitri Karamazov	Gruschenka	
1931	The Brothers Karamazov	Gruschenka	
1931	Salto Mortale	Marina	
1931	Bombs on Monte Carlo	Königin Yola I. von Pontenero	Bomben auf Monte Carlo
1932	Storms of Passion	Russen-Annya	
1934	Nana	Nana	
1934	We Live Again	Katusha Maslova	
1935	The Wedding Night	Manya Novak	
1936	A Woman Alone	Maria Krasnova	
1939	Exile Express	Nadine Nikolas	
1940	The Man I Married	Frieda Heinkel	
1941	So Ends Our Night	Lilo	
1943	Chetniks! The Fighting Guerrillas	Lubitca Mihailovitch	
1943	They Came to Blow Up America	Frau Reiter	
1943	Three Russian Girls	Natasha	
1948	Let's Live a Little	Michele Bennett	
1955	Soldier of Fortune	Madame Dupree	
1956	Runaway Daughters	Ruth Barton	
1962	The Nun and the Sergeant	Nun	

Television
Year	Series	Role	Episode
1956	The Red Skelton Show	Queen of Livonia	"County Fair or Minister of Agriculture"
1957	The Walter Winchell File	Frieda	"The Cupcake"
1959	Adventures in Paradise	Antonia	"The Bamboo Curtain"
1964	Arrest and Trial	Mrs. Van de Heuven	"Modus Operandi"

== See also ==
- Alla Nazimova
- Käthe von Nagy
- Igor Ilyinsky
- Ivan Mozzhukhin
- Ossip Runitsch
- Vera Kholodnaya

== Sources ==
- Rollberg, Peter (2009). "Sten, Anna". Historical Dictionary of Russian and Soviet Cinema. US: Rowman & Littlefield. pp. 666–667. ISBN 978-0-8108-6072-8.
- Novikova, Yelena (2002). "«Все думали, что она была немкой». Из жизни Анны Стен". Киноведческие записки. No. 58. pp. 356–367.
