= Nana (1934 film) =

1934 American film

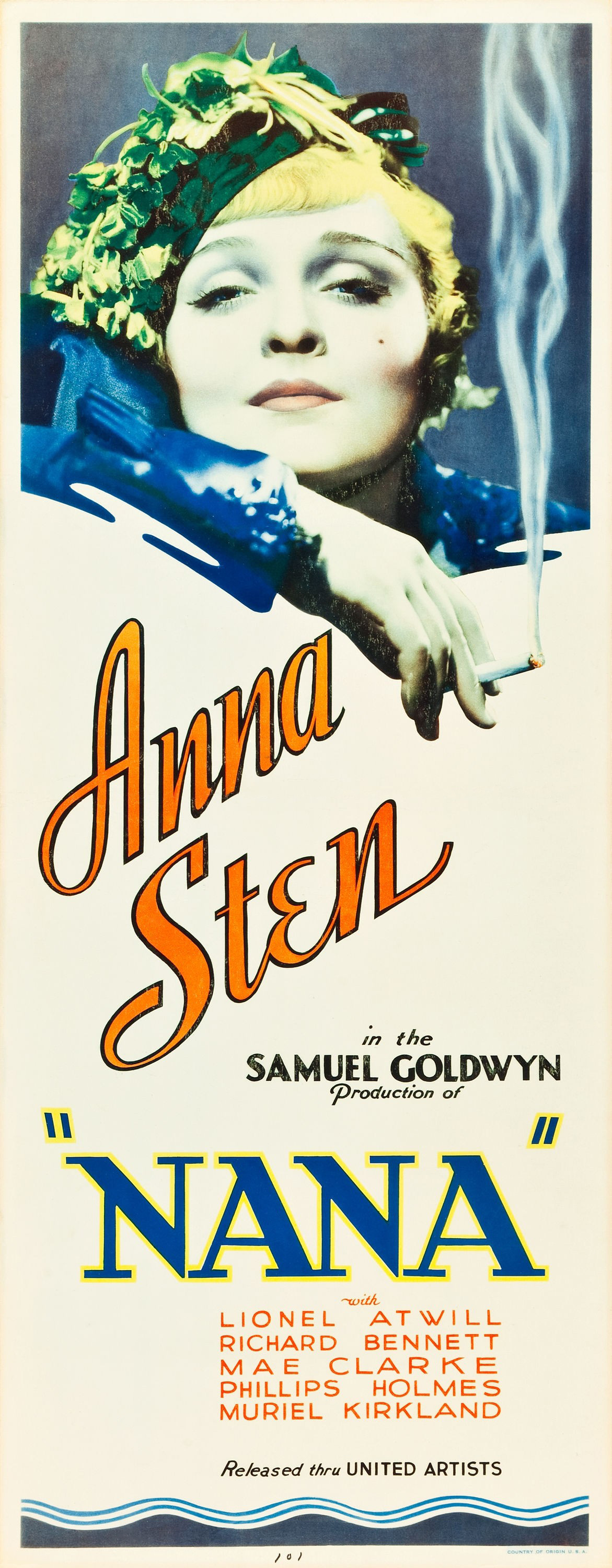
- Theatrical release poster
- Directed by: Dorothy Arzner; George Fitzmaurice
- Produced by: Samuel Goldwyn
- Starring: Anna Sten; Lionel Atwill; Richard Bennett; Mae Clarke
- Cinematography: Gregg Toland
- Edited by: Frank Lawrence
- Production company: Samuel Goldwyn Productions
- Distributed by: United Artists
- Release date: February 1, 1934 (US)
- Running time: 90 minutes
- Country: United States
- Language: English

Nana is a 1934 American pre-Code film, produced by Samuel Goldwyn, released through United Artists, starring Anna Sten. and directed by Dorothy Arzner and George Fitzmaurice.

Goldwyn's tutoring of Sten is mentioned in Cole Porter's 1934 song "Anything Goes" from the musical of the same name: "If Sam Goldwyn can with great conviction / Instruct Anna Sten in diction / Then Anna shows / Anything goes."

== Plot ==
A Parisian streetwalker, Nana, is discovered by a theatrical impresario and becomes a stage success. At her height of popularity, she falls in love with a soldier, George Muffat, and draws both ire and fascination from his protective older brother, Colonel Muffat.

Nana, along with her friends, Satin, Mimi, and Zoe, buy a villa in a countryside. It turns out that they have become neighbors with the Muffat family. Nana and Georges embark on a romantic relationship, much to Colonel de Muffat's disapproval. Colonel de Muffat sends George on a commission to Algeria in order to separate him from Nana, but George promises Nana that he will come back for her.

Months pass, and Nana has still not received any letters from George. Satin, Mimi and Zoe are revealed to have been intercepting the pair's letters in order to draw Nana back to the stage in the hopes that she will regain her former wealth. One day, Nana is met by an apologetic Colonel de Muffat, who offers to recommend her to a new theater venue. Nana accepts, and becomes the Colonel's mistress. While Nana enjoys the renewed attention she is receiving from fans, she misses Georges and consequently becomes an alcoholic.

Georges returns to Paris, and finds Nana. Georges believes that Nana has received his letters but has ignored them. Nevertheless, Georges wants to be with her. They decide to run away together, but Colonel de Muffat arrives, leading Nana to commit suicide.

== Cast ==
- Anna Sten as Nana
- Lionel Atwill as Colonel André Muffat
- Richard Bennett as Gaston Greiner
- Mae Clarke as Satin
- Phillips Holmes as Lieutenant George Muffat
- Reginald Owen as Bordenave
- Helen Freeman as Sabine Muffat
- Lawrence Grant as Grand Duke Alexis
- Jessie Ralph as Zoe
- Ferdinand Gottschalk as Finot
- Paul Hurst as Employer (uncredited)
- Tom Ricketts as Party Guest (uncredited)

== Reception ==
The film was a box-office disappointment. It is the first of three movies that Anna Sten made with Samuel Goldwyn before being released from her contract.
