= Eugene Frenke =

Russian-born film producer, director and writer (1895–1984)

Eugene Frenke (1 January 1895 – 10 March 1984) was a Russian-born film producer, director and writer. He twice collaborated with the director John Huston on the films Heaven Knows, Mr. Allison and The Barbarian and the Geisha.

Frenke was married to the Ukrainian actress Anna Sten, from 1932 until his death in 1984. She appeared in a number of his films.

== Partial filmography ==
- Girl in the Case (1934)
- Life Returns (1935)
- A Woman Alone (1936)
- Miss Robin Crusoe (1953)
