= Ronald Colman theatre performances and filmography =

Ronald Colman in a publicity still for The Prisoner of Zenda (1937).

Ronald Colman began his career as an actor on the stage following his service in the British Army during World War I. He made his film debut in an unreleased two-reeler titled The Live Wire (1917). After achieving minor success on the stage and in British films, he immigrated to the United States in 1920. There he continued his acting with only moderate success until he was offered the lead opposite Lillian Gish in The White Sister (1923). The film's popularity and critical acclaim led to Colman becoming a major star and also a romantic idol of the silent cinema. As a contract player for Samuel Goldwyn, Colman was cast (frequently on loan-out) as leading man to many of the top actress as the silent era. In five of his silents he formed a romantic team with Hungarian actress Vilma Bánky.

Colman made a successful transition to sound with his first talking feature, Bulldog Drummond (1929), followed by Raffles (1930) and The Unholy Garden (1931). After leaving Goldwyn in 1933, Colman continued his career as a free-lance performer and starred in a succession of critically acclaimed films (A Tale of Two Cities, Under Two Flags, Lost Horizon, The Prisoner of Zenda, If I Were King, and The Light That Failed). In 1948, Colman won the Academy Award for Best Actor for his performance in A Double Life.

The filmography below lists all of Colman's films and is sub-divided into four sections: His British silent films, his American silents, his sound films, and a listing of short films in which he appeared as himself. In addition to his film appearances, Colman's television credits are also listed, as well as his performances on the amateur and professional stage.

== Theatre performances ==
Season	Play Title	Theatre	Role	Notes
1909	Rich Miss Rustle	Victoria Hall, Ealing	Freddy Fitzfoodle	"An irresponsible opera comique" by Herbert Scott
1910	The Rose of Persia	Royal Court Theatre	Palace official or guard	with the Baltic Amateur Dramatic and Operatic Society
1910	Barbara	St. Saviour’s Parish Hall, Ealing	Finnicum	One-act play by Jerome K. Jerome
1910	Lights Out	St. Saviour’s Parish Hall, Ealing	Algernon Cuffe	One-act farce by Max Pemberton
1910	H.M.S. Pinafore	St. Martin’s Hall, Ealing	Bill Bobstay	West Middlesex Operatic Society
1910	Spoiling the Broth	Ealing Town Hall	David Wells	One-act play by Bertha N. Graham
1911	Jane	St. Martin’s Hall, West Acton		A farce in three acts by Harry Nicholls and William Lestocq
1911	The Admirable Crichton	King’s Hall, Covent Garden	John Treherne	Bancroft Dramatic Club
1912	A Tight Corner	St. Mary’s Parish Room, Hayes	Samson Quayle	Three act farce by Sidney Bowkett
1912	Priscilla Runs Away	King’s Hall, Covent Garden	Prince Henry of Lucerne	By Elizabeth von Arnim; Bancroft Dramatic Club
1912	The Adventure of Lady Ursula	Royal Court Theatre		with the Baltic Amateur Dramatic and Operatic Society
1912	Mr. Steinman’s Corner	St. Saviour’s Parish Hall, Ealing	The Stockbroker	One-act play by Alfred Sutro
1912	The Dancing Girl	King’s Hall, Covent Garden	John Christison	By Henry Arthur Jones; Bancroft Dramatic Club
1913	The Passing of the Third Floor Back	King’s Hall, Covent Garden	Christopher Penny	By Jerome K. Jerome; Bancroft Dramatic Club
1913	The Private Secretary	St. Martin’s Hall, Acton	Douglas Cattermole	Mr. Vivian Parrott’s Amateur Dramatic Society
1914	Fanny's First Play	King’s Hall, Covent Garden	Count O’ Dowda	Bancroft Dramatic Club
1914	Sowing the Wind	King’s Hall, Covent Garden	Ned Annesley	Bancroft Dramatic Club
1916	The Maharani of Arakan	London Coliseum	Rahmat Sheikh	By George Calderon, adapted from Rabindranath Tagore
1916	The Misleading Lady	The Playhouse, London	Stephen Weatherbee	Three-act play by Charles Goddard and Paul Dickey
1917	Partnership	Court Theatre, London	Webber	Comedy by Elizabeth Baker; London Repertory Theatre
1917	Damaged Goods	St Martin’s Theatre	George Dupont, the patient	replaces Reginald Bach
1918	The Little Brother	Ambassadors Theatre, London	George Lubin	Play by Benedict James, adapted from Milton Goldsmith, Rabbi and Priest
1918	The Bubble	tour	David Goldsmith	comedy in three acts by Edward Locke
1918	The Live Wire	tour	Wilfred „Chips“ Carpenter	Spy play by Sydney Blow and Douglas Hoare; touring lead
1919	Skittles	tour	Lord Vivian Roftus	comedy by Lechmere Worrall and Arthur Rose
1920	The Great Day	Drury Lane Theatre, London	Frank Beresford	drama by Louis N. Parker and George R. Sims; touring lead
1920	The Dauntless Three	Globe Theatre, Atlantic City	Turkish Police Chief; Russian Spy	A Mystery Play by Horace Annesley Vachell and Walter Hackett
1920	The Green Goddess	Booth Theatre, Broadway, New York	Temple Priest	
1921	The Silver Fox	Shubert-Belasco Theatre, Washington D.C.	Captain Douglas Belgrave	Play by Ferenc Herczeg, adapted by Cosmo Hamilton
1921	The Elton Case	Broadway Theatre, Long Branch, N.J.		produced by George Broadhurst
1921	The Nightcap	39th Street Theatre, New York	Charles, the butler	Mystery comedy in three acts by Max Marcin and Guy Bolton
1921	East is West	tour	James Potter	Comedy in three acts by Samuel Shipman and John B. Hymer
1922	East of Suez	Woods’ Theatre, Atlantic City	Henry Anderson	A play in five scenes by W. Somerset Maugham
1922	La Tendresse	Empire Theatre, Broadway, New York	Alain Sergyll	Drama by Henry Bataille, adapted by Ruth Chatterton

== Filmography ==
=== British silents ===
Year	Title	Role	Director	Co-stars	Notes
1917	The Live Wire	The Young Man	George Dewhurst	Phyllis Titmuss	Two reels Never released; now lost
1919	The Toilers	Bob	George Dewhurst	Manora Thew	Two reels survive
1919	A Daughter of Eve	Bit part (uncredited)	Walter West	Violet Hopson	Lost,
1919	Sheba	Bit part (uncredited)	Cecil M. Hepworth	Alma Taylor	Lost,
1919	Snow in the Desert	Rupert Sylvester	Walter West	Violet Hopson	Lost
1920	A Son of David	Maurice Phillips	Hay Plumb	Poppy Wyndham	Lost
1920	Anna the Adventuress	Brendan	Cecil M. Hepworth	Alma Taylor	Lost
1920	The Black Spider	Vicomte de Beaurais	William J. Humphrey	Lydia Kyasht	Lost

=== American silents ===
Year	Title	Role	Director	Co-stars	Notes
1921	Handcuffs or Kisses	Lodyard	George Archainbaud	Elaine Hammerstein, Julia Swayne Gordon	Lost
1923	The White Sister	Capt. Giovanni Severini	Henry King	Lillian Gish	Extant
1923	The Eternal City	Extra (uncredited)	George Fitzmaurice	Barbara La Marr, Bert Lytell	Survives incomplete
1924	Twenty Dollars a Week	Chester Reeves	Hamon F. Weight	George Arliss	
1924	Tarnish	Emmet Carr	George Fitzmaurice	May McAvoy, Marie Prevost	Lost
1924	Her Night of Romance	Paul Menford	Sidney Franklin	Constance Talmadge, Jean Hersholt	Extant
1924	Romola	Carlo Bucellini	Henry King	Lillian Gish, Dorothy Gish, William Powell	Extant
1925	A Thief in Paradise	Maurice Blake	George Fitzmaurice	Doris Kenyon, Aileen Pringle	Lost
1925	The Sporting Venus	Donald MacAllan	Marshall Neilan	Blanche Sweet, Lew Cody	Extant
1925	His Supreme Moment	John Douglas	George Fitzmaurice	Blanche Sweet, Belle Bennett, Ned Sparks	Technicolor sequences; lost
1925	Her Sister from Paris	Joseph Weyringer	Sidney Franklin	Constance Talmadge	Extant
1925	The Dark Angel	Captain Alan Trent	George Fitzmaurice	Vilma Bánky, Wyndham Standing	
1925	Stella Dallas	Stephen Dallas	Henry King	Belle Bennett, Alice Joyce, Douglas Fairbanks, Jr., Lois Moran, Jean Hersholt	Extant
1925	Lady Windermere's Fan	Lord Darlington	Ernst Lubitsch	May McAvoy, Bert Lytell	Extant
1926	Kiki	Victor Renal	Clarence Brown	Norma Talmadge, Gertrude Astor	Extant
1926	Beau Geste	Michael "Beau" Geste	Herbert Brenon	Neil Hamilton, Ralph Forbes, Noah Beery, Alice Joyce, Mary Brian, William Powell	Extant
1926	The Winning of Barbara Worth	Willard Holmes	Henry King	Vilma Bánky, Gary Cooper	Extant
1927	The Night of Love	Montero	George Fitzmaurice	Vilma Bánky, Montagu Love	Extant
1927	The Magic Flame	Tito the Clown / The Count	Henry King	Vilma Bánky, Gustav von Seyffertitz	Survives incomplete
1928	Two Lovers	Mark Van Rycke	Fred Niblo	Vilma Bánky, Noah Beery	Survives incomplete
1929	The Rescue	Tom Lingard	Herbert Brenon	Lili Damita	Survives incomplete

=== Sound films ===
Year	Title	Role	Director	Co-stars	Notes
1929	Bulldog Drummond	Capt. Hugh "Bulldog" Drummond	F. Richard Jones	Claud Allister, Joan Bennett, Montagu Love	Nominated – Academy Award for Best Actor
1929	Condemned	Michel	Wesley Ruggles	Ann Harding, Louis Wolheim, Dudley Digges	Nominated – Academy Award for Best Actor
1930	Raffles	Raffles	George Fitzmaurice; Harry d'Abbadie d'Arrast	Kay Francis, Frederick Kerr, Bramwell Fletcher, Frances Dade	
1930	The Devil to Pay!	Willie Hale	George Fitzmaurice	Loretta Young, Frederick Kerr, Myrna Loy	
1931	The Unholy Garden	Barrington Hunt	George Fitzmaurice	Fay Wray, Warren Hymer	
1931	Arrowsmith	Dr. Martin Arrowsmith	John Ford	Helen Hayes, Richard Bennett, Myrna Loy	
1932	Cynara	Jim Warlock	King Vidor	Kay Francis, Phyllis Barry, Henry Stephenson	
1933	The Masquerader	Sir John Chilcote / John Loder	Richard Wallace	Elissa Landi	
1934	Bulldog Drummond Strikes Back	Capt. Hugh "Bulldog" Drummond	Roy Del Ruth	Loretta Young, Warner Oland, Charles Butterworth, Una Merkel, C. Aubrey Smith	
1935	Clive of India	Robert Clive	Richard Boleslawski	Loretta Young, Colin Clive	
1935	A Tale of Two Cities	Sydney Carton	Jack Conway	Elizabeth Allan, Edna May Oliver, Reginald Owen, Basil Rathbone, Blanche Yurka	
1935	The Man Who Broke the Bank at Monte Carlo	Paul Gaillard	Stephen Roberts	Joan Bennett, Nigel Bruce, Colin Clive	
1936	Under Two Flags	Sgt. Victor	Frank Lloyd	Claudette Colbert, Victor McLaglen, Rosalind Russell	
1937	Lost Horizon	Robert Conway	Frank Capra	Jane Wyatt, Edward Everett Horton, Thomas Mitchell, Margo, Isabel Jewell, H. B. Warner, Sam Jaffe	Seven minutes of film missing, though the soundtrack is intact.
1937	The Prisoner of Zenda	Maj. Rudolf Rassendyll / King Rudolf V	John Cromwell	Madeleine Carroll, Douglas Fairbanks, Jr., C. Aubrey Smith, Raymond Massey, Mary Astor	Presented in sepiatone
1938	If I Were King	François Villon	Frank Lloyd	Frances Dee, Basil Rathbone	
1939	The Light That Failed	Dick Heldar	William Wellman	Walter Huston, Ida Lupino	
1940	Lucky Partners	David Grant	Lewis Milestone	Ginger Rogers, Jack Carson	
1941	My Life with Caroline	Anthony Mason	Lewis Milestone	Anna Lee, Charles Winninger	
1942	The Talk of the Town	Professor Michael Lightcap	George Stevens	Cary Grant, Jean Arthur, Edgar Buchanan, Glenda Farrell	
1942	Random Harvest	Charles Rainier	Mervyn LeRoy	Greer Garson, Philip Dorn, Susan Peters	Nominated — Academy Award for Best Actor; Nominated — New York Film Critics Circle Award for Best Actor
1944	Kismet	Hafiz	William Dieterle	Marlene Dietrich, James Craig, Edward Arnold, Joy Ann Page	Technicolor
1947	The Late George Apley	George Apley	Joseph L. Mankiewicz	Peggy Cummins, Edna Best	
1947	A Double Life	Anthony John	George Cukor	Signe Hasso, Edmond O'Brien, Shelley Winters	Academy Award for Best Actor; Golden Globe Award for Best Actor
1950	Champagne for Caesar	Beauregard Bottomley	Richard Whorf	Celeste Holm, Vincent Price, Barbara Britton, Art Linkletter	
1956	Around the World in 80 Days	Great Indian Peninsular Railway Official	Michael Anderson	David Niven, Cantinflas, Shirley MacLaine, Robert Newton	Todd-AO; EastmanColor
1957	The Story of Mankind	The Spirit of Man	Irwin Allen	Vincent Price, Cedric Hardwicke	Technicolor, (final film role)

=== Short film appearances as himself ===
Year	Title	Notes
1925	Screen Snapshots	Colman appears with Blanche Sweet and director George Fitzmaurice.
1928	Movie Industry Commercial	Colman appears with California governor Clement C. Young. Filmed in Technicolor.
1937	Screen Snapshots #9	A behind the scenes look during the shooting of Lost Horizon.
1942	It Happened One Noon	Colman, Cary Grant, Jean Arthur, and director George Stevens promote the British film The Invaders (1942).
1942	Hearst Metrotone News	Colman is seen en route to Washington, D.C., to appear in the "Stars Over America" war campaign.
1949	21st Academy Awards footage	Colman presents the Academy Award for Best Actress to Jane Wyman for her performance in Johnny Belinda.
1952	24th Academy Awards footage	Filmed in color.
1952	Hearst Metrotone News	Colman presents the Academy Award for Best Actress to Vivien Leigh for her performance in A Streetcar Named Desire.
1953	25th Academy Award footage	16mm kinescope.
1953	Hearst Metrotone News	At the Academy Awards Colman announces Shirley Booth as the Best Actress winner for her performance in Come Back, Little Sheba.
1953	The Globe Playhouse	Colman narrates this documentary short.

== Television ==
Year	Title	Role	Director	Co-stars	Network
1952	Four Star Playhouse; Episode: "The Lost Silk Hat"	Gentleman Caller	Robert Florey	Richard Whorf	CBS
1953	The 25th Annual Academy Awards	Himself; Presenter: Best Actress	Bill Bennington	Bob Hope and Conrad Nagel (MCs), Shirley Booth (Best Actress Award winner)	NBC
1953	Four Star Playhouse; Episode: "The Man Who Walked Out on Himself"	John Cameron	Robert Florey	Francis Pierlot	CBS
1953	Four Star Playhouse; Episode: "Ladies in His Mind"	Dr. Matthew Bosnaquent	Robert Florey	Benita Hume, Patricia Morison, Hillary Brooke	CBS
1954	Four Star Playhouse; Episode: "A String of Beads"	Somerset Maugham	William Cameron Menzies	Angela Lansbury, George Macready, Nigel Bruce	CBS
1954–55	The Halls of Ivy (39 episodes)	Dr. William Todd Hunter	Norman Z. McLeod; William Cameron Menzies; William D. Russell	Benita Hume, Mary Wickes, Ray Collins, Arthur Q. Bryan	CBS
1956	Studio 57; Episode: "Perfect Likeness"	Painter	Don Weis	Kim Hunter	Syndicated
1956	The Jack Benny Program; Episode: "The Mistaken Dinner Invitation"	Himself	Ralph Levy	Jack Benny, Mary Livingstone, Eddie "Rochester" Anderson, Benita Hume, Don Wilson, Benita Hume	CBS
1957	General Electric Theater; Episode: "The Chess Game"	Mr. Graham	Herschel Daughtery	Clifford Tatum	CBS
