= Samuel Goldwyn Productions =

American film production company

- Type: Independent
- Industry: Film
- Founded: 1923; 103 years ago
- Founder: Samuel Goldwyn
- Defunct: 1959; 67 years ago
- Fate: Defunct
- Successors: Company: The Samuel Goldwyn Company; Library: Skydance Corporation (through Warner Bros. Pictures (United States only) and Miramax (Internationally)) (Paramount Pictures also handles the U.S. rights to The North Star only); Metro-Goldwyn-Mayer (U.S. rights to The Hurricane only); Video-Cinema Films (Rights to Street Scene only); Public domain (U.S. only, pre-1931)
- Headquarters: United States
- Products: Motion pictures
- Services: Film production

Samuel Goldwyn Productions was an American film production company founded by Samuel Goldwyn in 1923, and active through 1959. Personally controlled by Goldwyn and focused on production rather than distribution, the company developed into the most financially and critically successful independent production company in the Golden Age of Hollywood.

== History ==
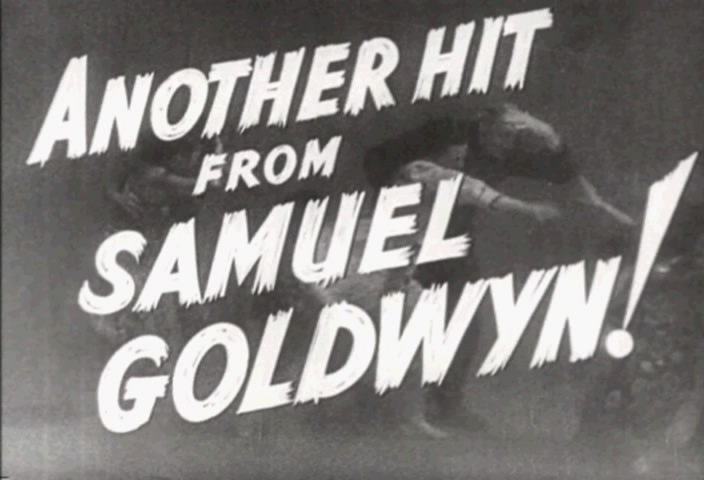
From the trailer for The Hurricane (1937)

After the sale of his previous firm Goldwyn Pictures, Samuel Goldwyn organized his productions beginning in February 1923, initially in a partnership with director George Fitzmaurice (Metro-Goldwyn-Mayer, created by merger in April 1924, bears Goldwyn's name, but he did not produce films there). Goldwyn Production's first release, Potash and Perlmutter, successfully opened in Baltimore on September 6, 1923.

Some of the early productions bear the name "Howard Productions", named for Goldwyn's wife Frances Howard, who married Goldwyn in 1925. In the 1920s, Goldwyn released films through Associated First National. Throughout the 1930s, Goldwyn released most of his films through United Artists. Beginning in 1941, Goldwyn released most of his films through RKO Radio Pictures.

With consistently high production values and directors like John Ford and Howard Hawks, Goldwyn frequently received Academy Award for Best Picture nominations: Arrowsmith (1931), Dodsworth (1936), Dead End (1937), Wuthering Heights (1939), and The Little Foxes (1941). In 1946, he won best picture for The Best Years of Our Lives.

Through the 1940s and 1950s, many of Goldwyn's films starred Danny Kaye. Goldwyn's final production was the 1959 version of Porgy and Bess.

Elements for many films produced by Samuel Goldwyn Productions between 1929 and 1955 are held by the Academy Film Archive as part of the Samuel Goldwyn Collection.

== Filmography ==
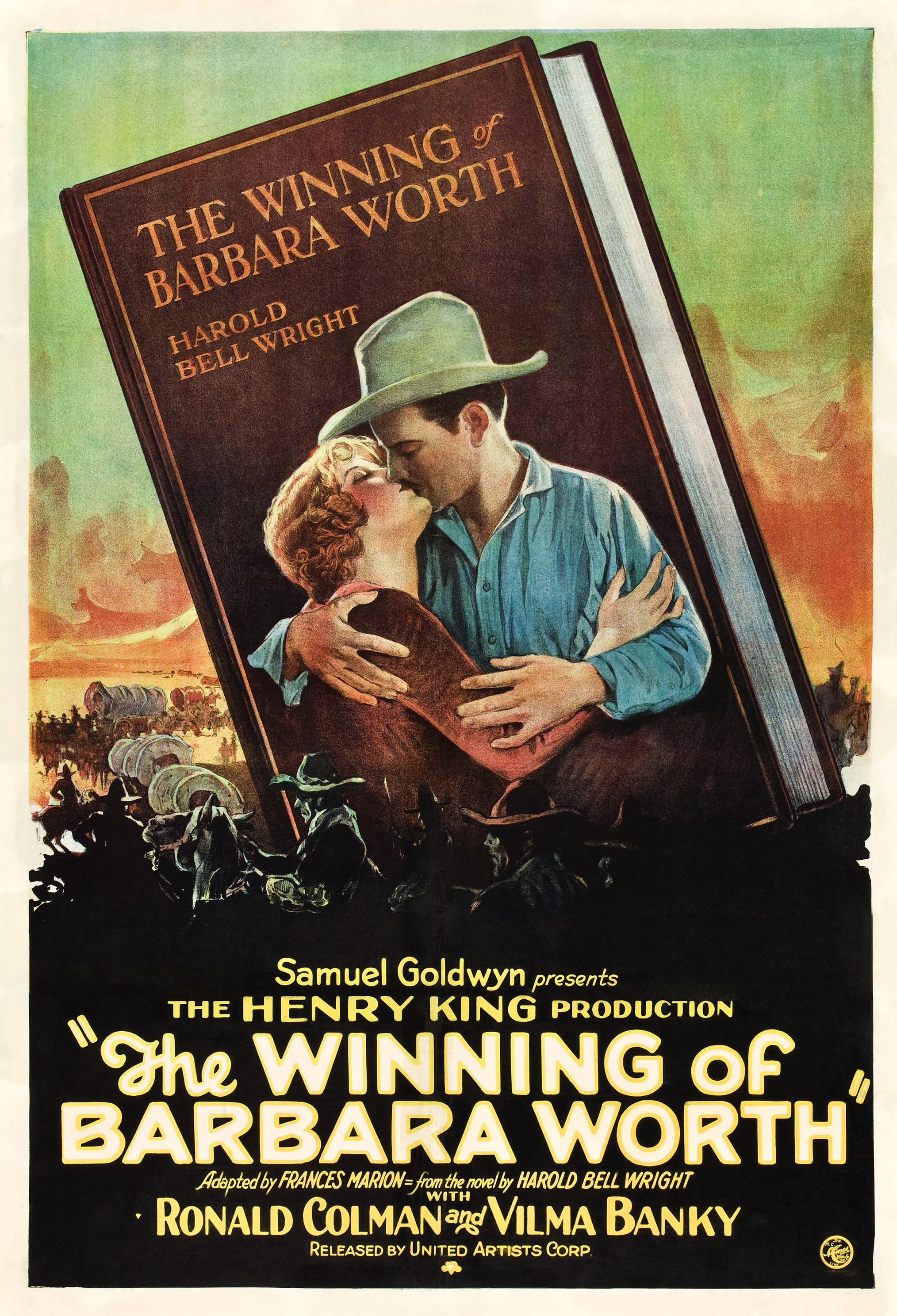
Poster for The Winning of Barbara Worth (1926)

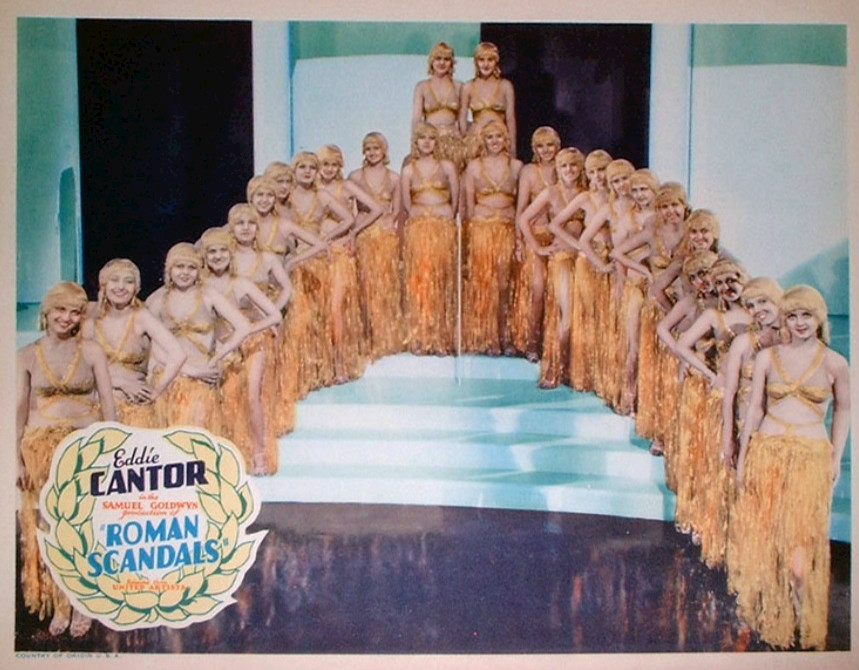
Lobby card for Roman Scandals (1933)

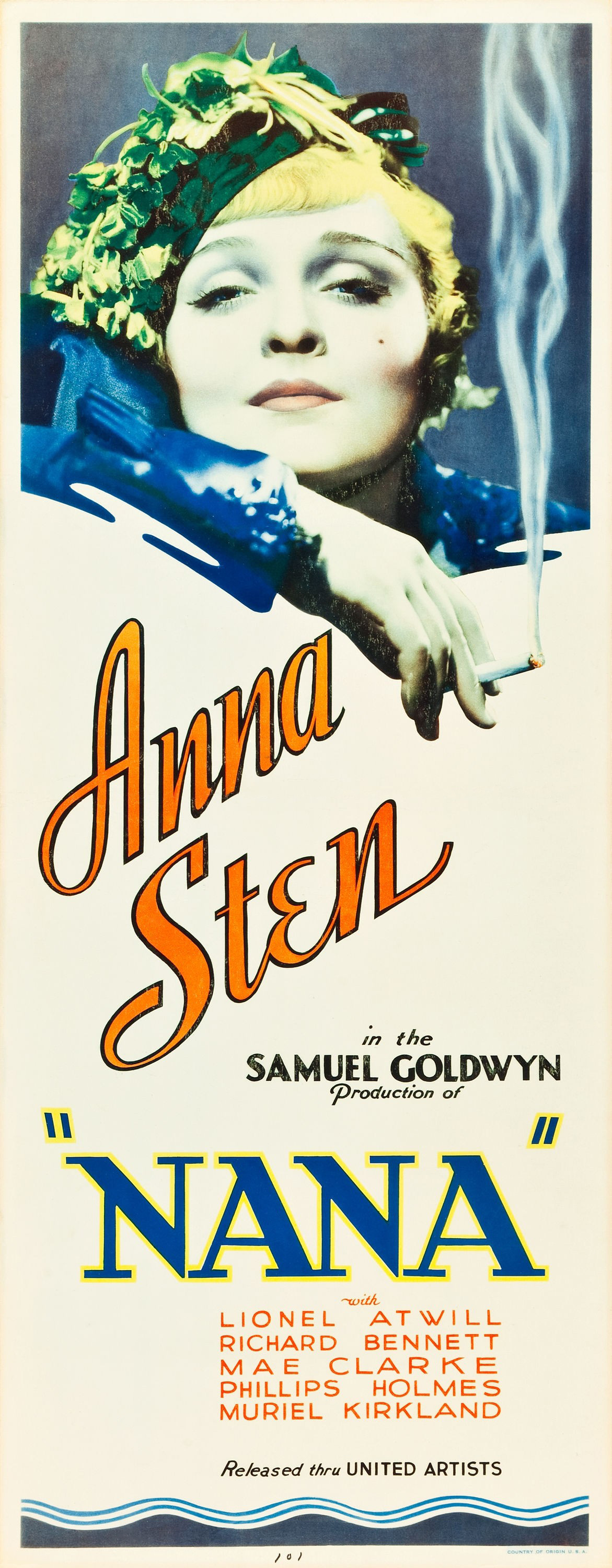
Poster for Nana (1934)

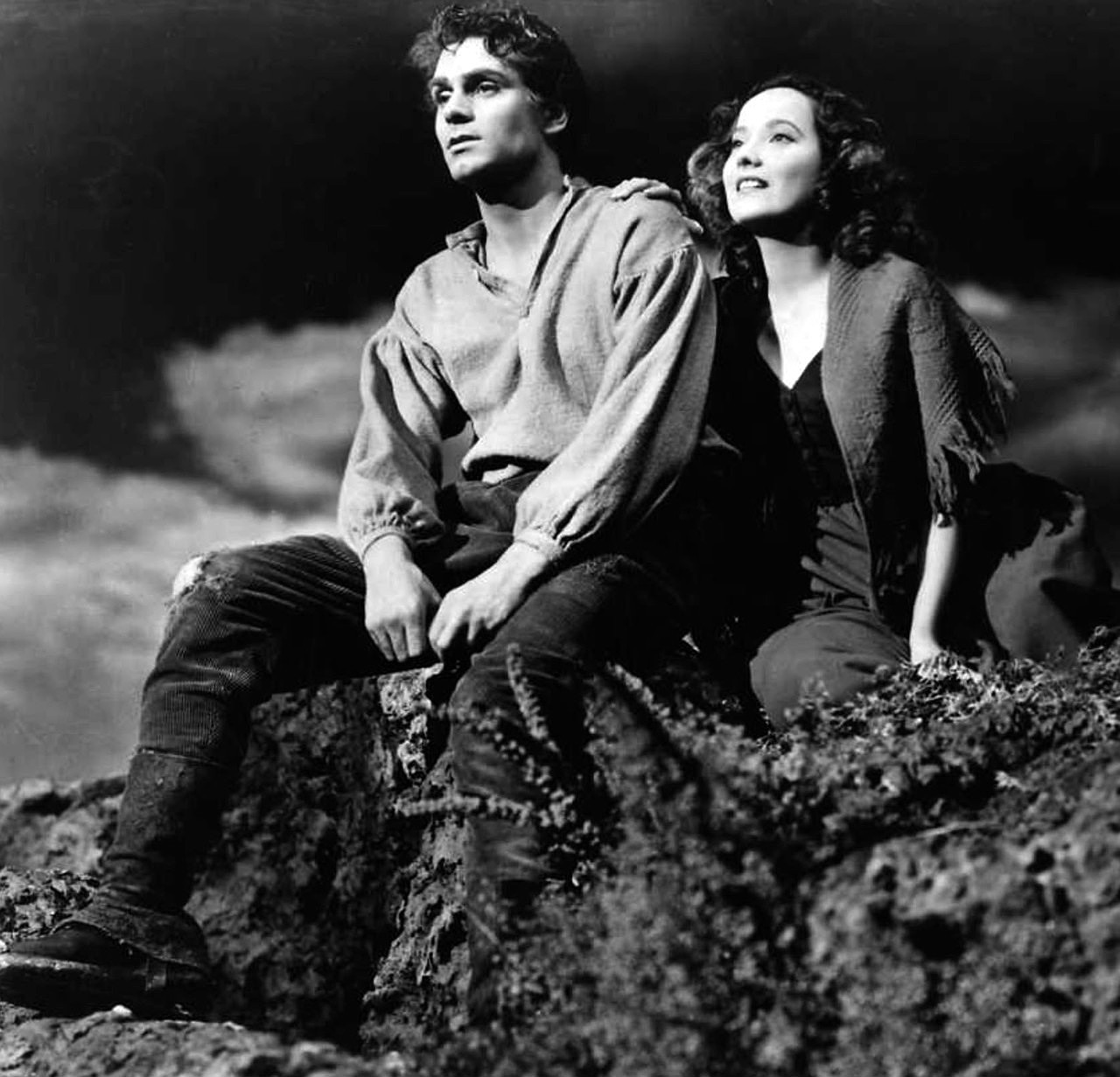
Laurence Olivier and Merle Oberon in Wuthering Heights (1939)

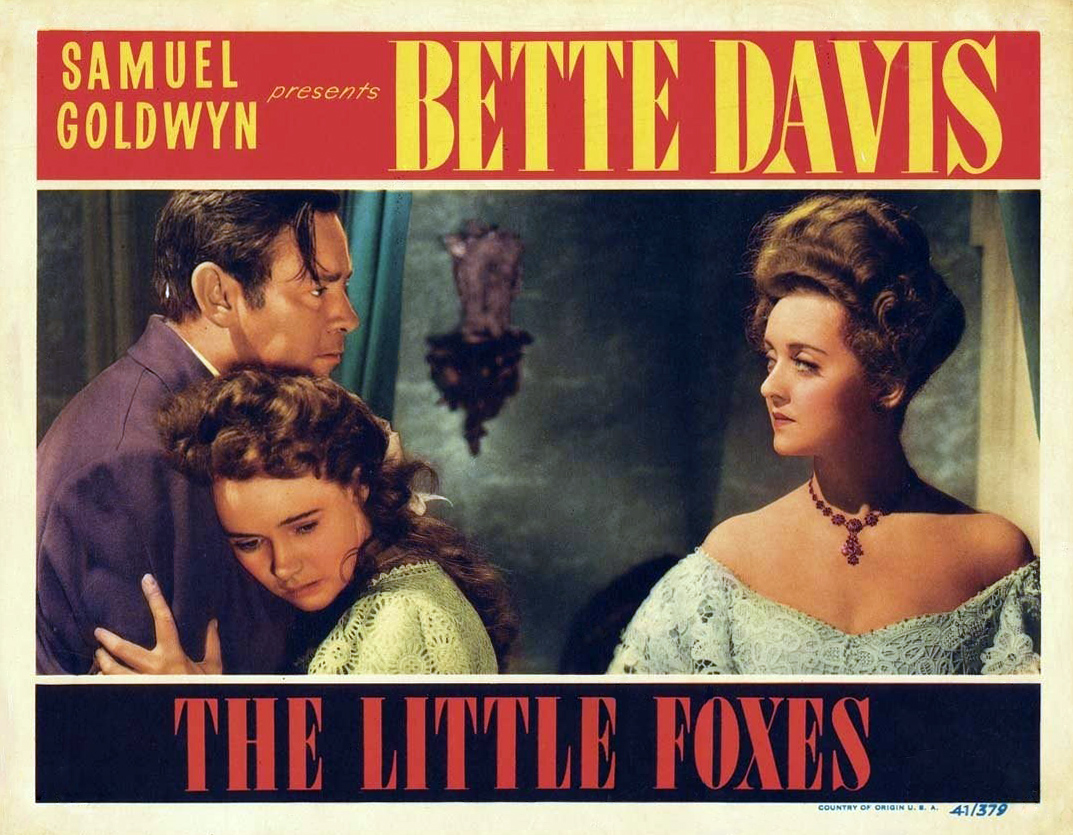
Lobby card for The Little Foxes (1941)

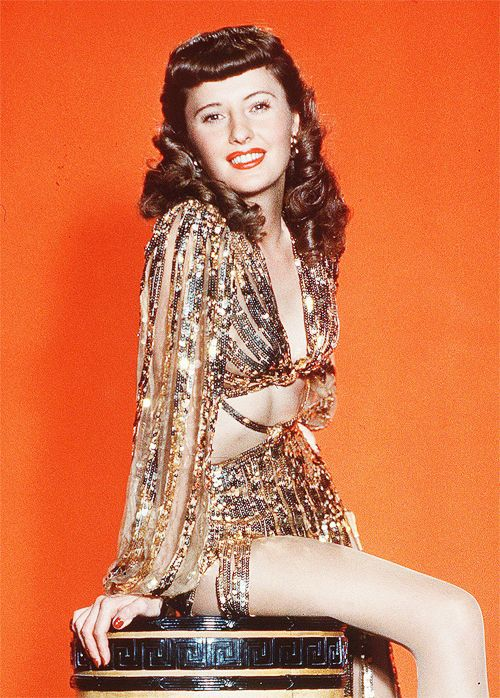
Barbara Stanwyck in Ball of Fire (1941)

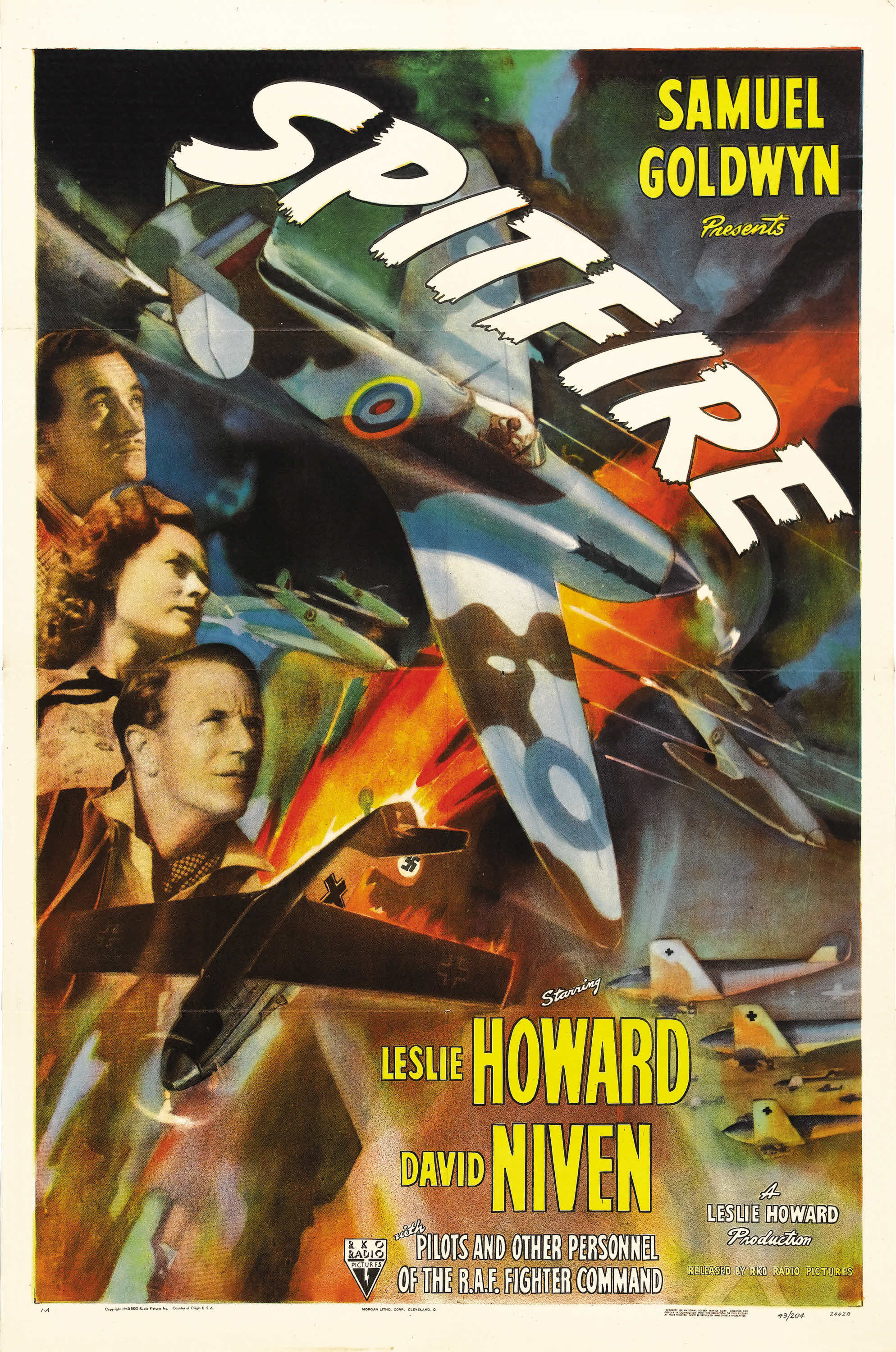
Poster for Spitfire (1943)

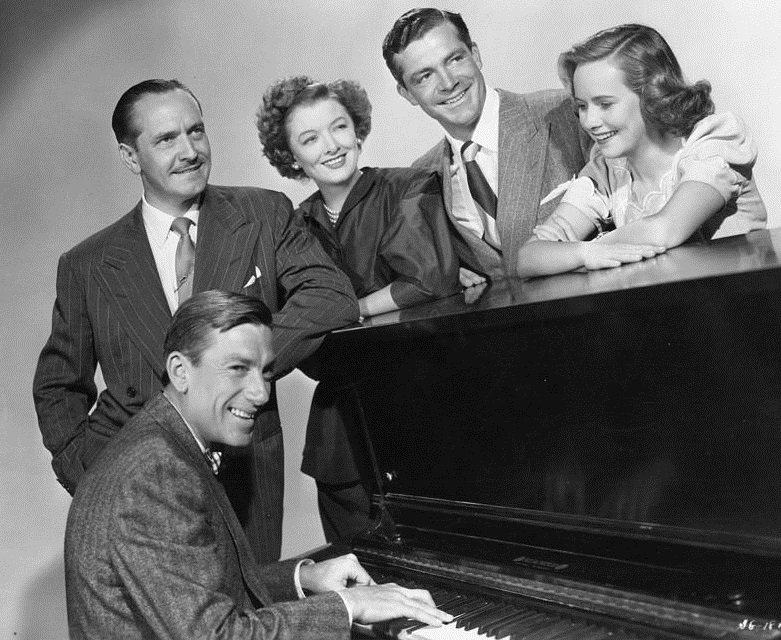
Hoagy Carmichael, Fredric March, Myrna Loy, Dana Andrews and Teresa Wright in a publicity photo for The Best Years of Our Lives (1946)

Release date	Title	Distributor	Notes
September 6, 1923	Potash and Perlmutter	First National	
January 24, 1924	The Eternal City	First National	
April 3, 1924	Cytherea	First National	
September 29, 1924	In Hollywood with Potash and Perlmutter	First National	
May 3, 1925	His Supreme Moment	First National	
June 18, 1925	A Thief in Paradise	First National	
September 27, 1925	The Dark Angel	First National	
November 16, 1925	Stella Dallas	United Artists	
February 15, 1926	Partners Again	United Artists	
October 14, 1926	The Winning of Barbara Worth	United Artists	
January 27, 1927	The Night of Love	United Artists	
September 18, 1927	The Magic Flame	United Artists	
November 3, 1927	The Devil Dancer	United Artists	
March 23, 1928	Two Lovers	United Artists	
November 17, 1928	The Awakening	United Artists	
January 12, 1929	The Rescue	United Artists	
May 2, 1929	Bulldog Drummond	United Artists	
June 22, 1929	This Is Heaven	United Artists	
November 3, 1929	Condemned	United Artists	
July 24, 1930	Raffles	United Artists	
October 5, 1930	Whoopee!	United Artists	
December 20, 1930	The Devil to Pay!	United Artists	
January 14, 1931	One Heavenly Night	United Artists	
September 5, 1931	Street Scene	United Artists	
October 3, 1931	Palmy Days	United Artists	
October 28, 1931	The Unholy Garden	United Artists	
December 17, 1931	Tonight or Never	United Artists	
December 26, 1931	Arrowsmith	United Artists	
February 13, 1932	The Greeks Had a Word for Them	United Artists	
November 17, 1932	The Kid from Spain	United Artists	
December 24, 1932	Cynara	United Artists	
September 3, 1933	The Masquerader	United Artists	
December 29, 1933	Roman Scandals	United Artists	
February 1, 1934	Nana	United Artists	
November 1, 1934	We Live Again	United Artists	
November 10, 1934	Kid Millions	United Artists	
March 8, 1935	The Wedding Night	United Artists	
September 8, 1935	The Dark Angel	United Artists	
October 13, 1935	Barbary Coast	United Artists	
November 22, 1935	Splendor	United Artists	
January 24, 1936	Strike Me Pink	United Artists	
March 18, 1936	These Three	United Artists	
September 23, 1936	Dodsworth	United Artists	Inducted into the National Film Registry in 1990
November 6, 1936	Come and Get It	United Artists	
December 25, 1936	Beloved Enemy	United Artists	
May 7, 1937	Woman Chases Man	United Artists	
August 6, 1937	Stella Dallas	United Artists	
August 27, 1937	Dead End	United Artists	
November 9, 1937	The Hurricane	United Artists	
February 4, 1938	The Goldwyn Follies	United Artists	
April 15, 1938	The Adventures of Marco Polo	United Artists	
November 17, 1938	The Cowboy and the Lady	United Artists	
April 7, 1939	Wuthering Heights	United Artists	Inducted into the National Film Registry in 2007
August 18, 1939	They Shall Have Music	United Artists	
September 29, 1939	The Real Glory	United Artists	
December 29, 1939	Raffles	United Artists	
September 20, 1940	The Westerner	United Artists	
August 29, 1941	The Little Foxes	RKO Radio Pictures	
December 2, 1941	Ball of Fire	RKO Radio Pictures	Inducted into the National Film Registry in 2016
July 14, 1942	The Pride of the Yankees	RKO Radio Pictures	Inducted into the National Film Registry in 2024
January 27, 1943	They Got Me Covered	RKO Radio Pictures	
June 12, 1943	Spitfire	RKO Radio Pictures	
November 4, 1943	The North Star	RKO Radio Pictures	
February 17, 1944	Up in Arms	RKO Radio Pictures	
November 17, 1944	The Princess and the Pirate	RKO Radio Pictures	
June 8, 1945	Wonder Man	RKO Radio Pictures	
March 21, 1946	The Kid from Brooklyn	RKO Radio Pictures	
November 21, 1946	The Best Years of Our Lives	RKO Radio Pictures	Inducted into the National Film Registry in 1989
August 4, 1947	The Secret Life of Walter Mitty	RKO Radio Pictures	
December 9, 1947	The Bishop's Wife	RKO Radio Pictures	
October 19, 1948	A Song Is Born	RKO Radio Pictures	
December 11, 1948	Enchantment	RKO Radio Pictures	
August 18, 1949	Roseanna McCoy	RKO Radio Pictures	
December 25, 1949	My Foolish Heart	RKO Radio Pictures	
July 27, 1950	Our Very Own	RKO Radio Pictures	
August 2, 1950	Edge of Doom	RKO Radio Pictures	
December 22, 1951	I Want You	RKO Radio Pictures	
November 25, 1952	Hans Christian Andersen	RKO Radio Pictures	
November 3, 1955	Guys and Dolls	Metro-Goldwyn-Mayer	
June 24, 1959	Porgy and Bess	Columbia Pictures	Inducted into the National Film Registry in 2011

== Distribution ==
In 2012, the distribution rights of Samuel Goldwyn films from the library were transferred to Warner Bros. Entertainment, with Miramax managing global licensing; the latter was handled by StudioCanal as part of a deal with Miramax until 2021, when ViacomCBS (now Skydance Corporation), under its flagship studio Paramount Pictures, acquired a 49% stake in Miramax and worldwide distribution rights to its content library. U.S. rights to The Hurricane, which had since reverted back to United Artists, are currently owned by its parent company, Metro-Goldwyn-Mayer, now part of Amazon MGM Studios. Rights to The North Star were not initially renewed due to its controversial subject matter, thus had fallen in to the public domain. Currently, U.S. rights to the film are handled by Paramount as a successor to National Telefilm Associates, which distributed a re-cut version in 1957 as Armored Attack, one of the few Goldwyn titles not included in the Warner–Miramax arrangement. Studio Distribution Services, LLC., a joint venture between Warner Bros. Home Entertainment and Universal Pictures Home Entertainment, distributes the entire Samuel Goldwyn catalog on home video, including The Hurricane, via a distribution deal with MGM Home Entertainment. Rights to Street Scene were retained by the estate of its author Elmer Rice, which would transfer ownership to Video-Cinema Films in 2004.

== See also ==
- Goldwyn Pictures, the film production and distribution company active from 1916 and merged with Metro Pictures and Louis B. Mayer Pictures to form Metro-Goldwyn-Mayer on April 16, 1924.
- Samuel Goldwyn Studio, informal name for the Pickford-Fairbanks Studios lot in Hollywood.
- The Samuel Goldwyn Company, founded by Samuel Goldwyn Jr. in 1979, active through 1997.
- Samuel Goldwyn Films, founded by Goldwyn Jr. in 2000.
