= Splendor (1935 film) =

1935 film by Elliott Nugent

- Theatrical release poster
- Directed by: Elliott Nugent
- Written by: Rachel Crothers (story, uncredited)
- Produced by: Samuel Goldwyn
- Starring: Miriam Hopkins; Joel McCrea
- Cinematography: Gregg Toland
- Edited by: Margaret Clancey
- Production company: Samuel Goldwyn Productions
- Distributed by: United Artists
- Release date: November 22, 1935
- Running time: 75 minutes
- Country: United States
- Language: English

Splendor is a 1935 American drama film starring Miriam Hopkins and Joel McCrea, produced by Samuel Goldwyn, and distributed by United Artists. The film is based on the play by Rachel Crothers.

== Cast ==
- Miriam Hopkins as Phyllis Manning Lorrimore
- Joel McCrea as Brighton Lorrimore
- Paul Cavanagh as Martin Deering
- Helen Westley as Mrs. Emmeline Lorrimore
- Billie Burke as Clarissa
- David Niven as Clancey Lorrimore
- Katharine Alexander as Martha Lorrimore
- Arthur Treacher as Major Ballinger
- Ruth Weston as Edith Gilbert

== Production ==
It is the third film made by Hopkins and McCrea after The Richest Girl in the World and Barbary Coast. The two later starred in These Three and Woman Chases Man.
