= Tonight or Never (1931 film) =

1931 film

- Theatrical release poster
- Directed by: Mervyn LeRoy
- Written by: Fanny Hatton; Frederic Hatton; Lily Hatvany; Ernest Vajda
- Produced by: Samuel Goldwyn
- Starring: Gloria Swanson; Melvyn Douglas
- Cinematography: Gregg Toland
- Edited by: Grant Whytock
- Music by: Alfred Newman
- Production company: Samuel Goldwyn Productions
- Distributed by: United Artists
- Release date: December 17, 1931
- Running time: 80 minutes
- Country: United States
- Language: English

Tonight or Never is a 1931 American pre-Code comedy film directed by Mervyn LeRoy and starring Gloria Swanson, Melvyn Douglas (in his screen debut) and Boris Karloff. The film is inspired by the Hungarian play of the same name, written by Lili Hatvany and performed on Broadway between November 1930 and June 1931. The title is derived from the name of a perfume by Offenthal, released in 1927.

== Plot ==
Nella Vargo is a Hungarian prima donna whose latest performances include singing Tosca in Venice. Although she is praised by the audience, her music teacher Rudig feels that she cannot be the greatest opera singer in history until she performs in New York City. When she is criticized for not putting her soul into the song, she gets mad, until she suddenly notices a mysterious man walking on the street. She becomes smitten with the man, until Rudig claims that he is a gigolo whose latest client is Marchesa Bianca San Giovanni, a former diva with a notorious past.

Later that night, Nella heads to Budapest, accompanied by Rudig, her butler Conrad, her maid Emma and her fiancé Count Albert von Gronac, whom she does not love. She is shocked to discover that the mysterious man is on board as well, with the marchesa as his company. Rudig again suggests that she will never be a great singer if she does not experience love. The next day, Rudig announces that Fletcher, an agent for New York's prestigious Metropolitan Opera, is in town to sign European artists. Later that afternoon, she learns that her fiancé is having an affair with one of her enemies.

Furious and upset with her love life, she hires the mysterious man, Jim, hoping to experience love and thereby impress Fletcher. She is attracted to Jim, but is afraid to have her as his admirer. Jim, who is actually Fletcher, soon learns that Nella believes that he is a gigolo. Instead of revealing the truth, he pretends to be a gigolo and forces her to make a decision: spend the night with him or leave within three minutes.

Nella decides to spend the night with Jim, but leaves the next morning before he awakes. That night, she again gives a performance of Tosca, which is acclaimed as the greatest in her entire career. After returning home, she is overcome by joy to learn that she has landed a contract with the Metropolitan Opera, but feels guilty for what she had done the night before. The same day, Jim visits her, returning the necklace that she had left him to pay for his services and demanding that she choose between him and the contract. When she tears apart the contract, he realizes that she is in love with him and he reveals himself to be a nephew of the marchesa and the famous talent scout. Now, Nella can have the successful New York career of her dreams.

== Cast ==
- Gloria Swanson as Nella Vargo
- Melvyn Douglas as Jim Fletcher
- Alison Skipworth as Marchesa Bianca San Giovanni
- Ferdinand Gottschalk as Rudig
- Robert Greig as Conrad
- Warburton Gamble as Count Albert von Gronac
- Greta Meyer as Emma
- Boris Karloff as a comical waiter

== Production ==
The film is based on the Hungarian play of the same name, written by Lili Hatvany, which was performed on Broadway between November 18, 1930 and June 1931. In the film, Melvyn Douglas, Ferdinand Gottschalk, Robert Greig, Greta Meyer and Warburton Gamble re-created their stage roles. In June 1931, Adela Rogers St. Johns was assigned to write the screenplay. A month later, she was replaced with Sheridan Gibney, who was eventually replaced as well. According to a January 1931 news article, George Fitzmaurice was initially set to direct, but he was replaced by Mervyn LeRoy, who as a young unknown had appeared uncredited as a newsboy in Swanson's 1923 silent societal drama Prodigal Daughters.

Joseph Schenck cast Gloria Swanson to play the lead role, believing it would help her recover from a career slump. The film was the only one of Swanson's early sound films in which she did not sing, despite playing an opera singer. The film marked Douglas' screen debut.

The Hays Office strongly objected to the film and demanded several cuts. The scene thought to be the most vulgar was the love scene between Nella and Jim. A staff member commented: "This scene was one of the most offensive, if not the most offensive—in my recollection." The film was permitted a release in 1931, but as enforcement of the Motion Picture Production Code commenced in 1934, requests for re-releases in 1935 and 1937 were rejected.

== See also ==
- Boris Karloff filmography
