= Orphans of Happiness =

1922 film

- German: Schattenkinder des Glücks
- Directed by: Franz Osten
- Written by: Heinrich Kerdon
- Starring: Vilma Bánky
- Cinematography: Franz Koch; Frank Planer
- Production company: Münchner Lichtspielkunst
- Distributed by: Bavaria Film
- Release date: 1922
- Country: Germany
- Languages: Silent; German intertitles

Orphans of Happiness or Shadow Children of Happiness (German: Schattenkinder des Glücks) is a 1922 German silent film directed by Franz Osten and starring Vilma Bánky.

It was made at the Emelka Studios in Munich.

== Cast ==
In alphabetical order

- Vilma Bánky
- Emil Fenyő
- Carl Goetz
- Ila Lóth
- Ferdinand Martini
- Toni Wittels

== Bibliography ==
- Schildgen, Rachel A. (2010). More Than A Dream: Rediscovering the Life and Films of Vilma Banky. Hollywood: 1921 PVG Publishing. ISBN 0982770928.
