= Nagydorog =

- Location of Tolna county in Hungary

- Location of Nagydorog
- Coordinates: 46.62247°N 18.65942°E
- Country: Hungary
- County: Tolna

Area
  - Total: 41.44 km^{2} (16.00 sq mi)

Population (2004)
  - Total: 2,834
  - Density: 68.38/km^{2} (177.1/sq mi)
- Time zone: UTC+1 (CET)
  - Summer (DST): UTC+2 (CEST)
- Postal code: 7044
- Area code: 75

Nagydorog is a large village in Tolna County, Hungary.

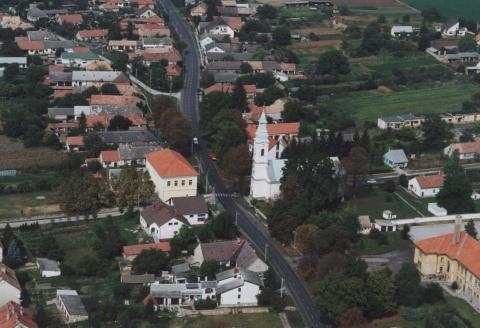
Aerial photography of Nagydorog

Nagydorog is the birthplace of actress Vilma Bánky (1901–1991).
