= One Heavenly Night =

1931 film

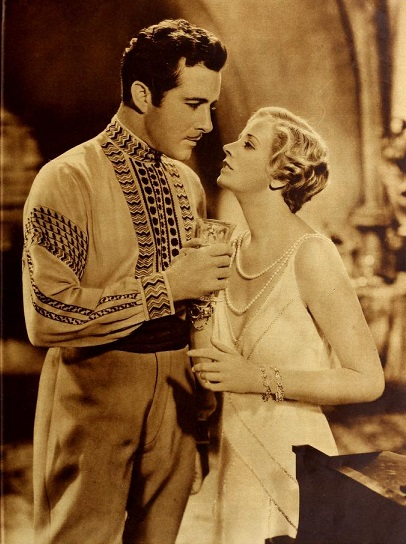
- John Boles and Evelyn Laye in One Heavenly Night
- Directed by: George Fitzmaurice
- Written by: Louis Bromfield (story); Sidney Howard (adaptation)
- Produced by: Samuel Goldwyn; Arthur Hornblow Jr. (uncredited)
- Cinematography: George Barnes; Gregg Toland
- Edited by: Stuart Heisler
- Production company: Samuel Goldwyn Productions
- Distributed by: United Artists
- Release date: January 14, 1931
- Running time: 82 min.
- Country: United States
- Language: English

One Heavenly Night is a 1931 American pre-Code film, produced by Samuel Goldwyn, released through United Artists, and directed by George Fitzmaurice.

The film is now in the public domain as it was copyrighted on 20 December 1930 (Registration Number LP1842).

This film brought Goldwyn his worst reviews and largest financial loss ($300,000) since going independent in 1923. However, the profits from Whoopee! (1930) more than made up the difference.

== Plot ==
The film follows Lilli, a flower cellar and an opera star Fritzi, who has gotten herself into trouble with the law. Fritzi sends Lilli in her place when she’s forced to a rural town for six months. While there, Lilli falls in love with a local, who doesn’t know she isn’t Fritzi until the real Fritzi shows up

== Cast ==
- Evelyn Laye as Lilli
- John Boles as Count Mirko Tibor
- Leon Errol as Otto
- Lilyan Tashman as Fritzi Vajos
- Hugh Cameron as Janos
- Henry Kolker as Prefect of Police
- Marion Lord as Liska
- Henry Victor as Almady, the Officer
- Lionel Belmore as Baron Zagon

== Production ==
Filmed in West Hollywood at Samuel Goldwyn Studios, the film had a very large production crew as Goldwyn stacked the project with top studio talent and several specialists across different departments: With director George Fitzmaurice, writers Louis Bromfield and Sidney Howard, two cinematographers, George Barnes and Gregg Toland, Editor Stuart Heisler, and producers Samuel Goldwyn and Arthur Hornblow JR and many more...
