= This Is Heaven =

1929 film

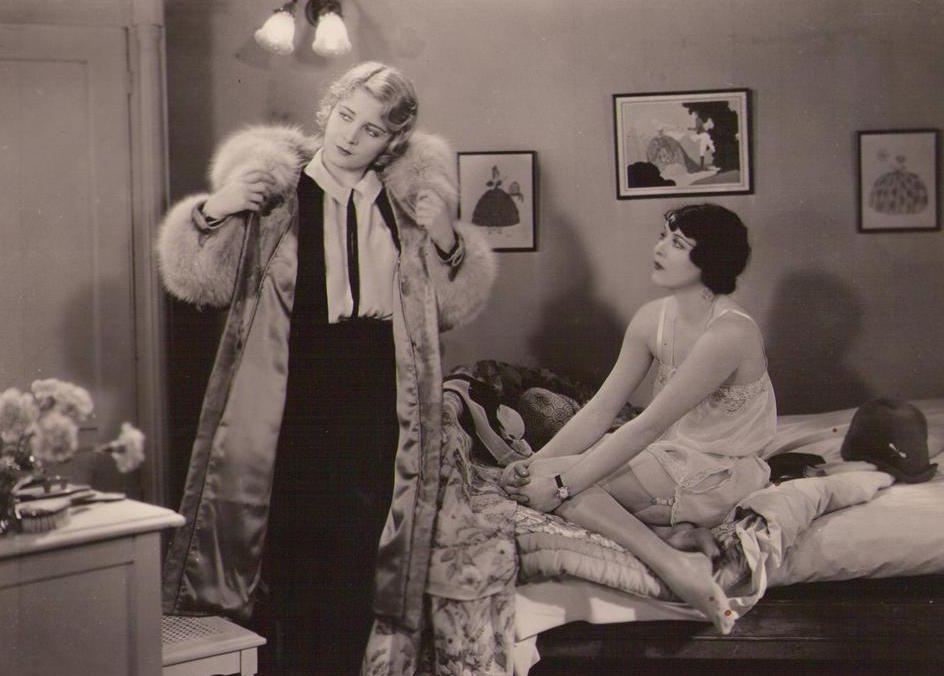
- Still with Fritzi Ridgeway and Vilma Banky
- Directed by: Alfred Santell
- Written by: Hope Loring (screenplay); George Marion (dialogue); Arthur Mantell
- Produced by: Samuel Goldwyn
- Starring: Vilma Bánky
- Cinematography: George Barnes; Gregg Toland
- Edited by: Viola Lawrence
- Music by: Hugo Riesenfeld
- Production company: Samuel Goldwyn Productions
- Distributed by: United Artists
- Release date: June 22, 1929
- Running time: 90 min. (Sound Version)
- Country: United States
- Languages: Sound (Part-Talkie); English intertitles

This Is Heaven is a lost 1929 American sound part-talkie pre-code romantic comedy film directed by Alfred Santell starring Vilma Bánky. In addition to sequences with audible dialogue or talking sequences, the film features a synchronized musical score and sound effects along with English intertitles. The soundtrack was recorded using the Western Electric sound-on-film system. The film was produced by Samuel Goldwyn and released through United Artists.

The film concerns a newly arrived Hungarian immigrant learns to accustom herself to the new and strange life she finds in New York City.

== Plot ==
At Ellis Island in New York City, Eva Petrie (Vilma Bánky), a newly arrived Hungarian immigrant meets her uncle, Frank Chase, a subway motorman, and his daughter, Mamie, with whom she will reside in the Bronx, Mamie gains Eva a job as a cook and waitress at Child's Restaurant on Fifth Avenue, and tries unsuccessfully, to interest her in wealthy men. Eva spots Jimmy on the subway one morning, he is wearing a chauffeur's cap, though he is actually a millionaire. Later, she is sent to preside over a griddle at a charity bazaar, where she becomes reacquainted Jimmy —while pretending to be an exiled Russian princess. He realizes the deception and pretends to be a chauffeur. Eva and Jimmy following a romantic courtship, are married, and she insists he go into the taxi business. Uncle Frank, however, gambles their last payment on a taxi, and Eva is forced to borrow money from Mamie's wealthy lover. Jimmy then drops the pretense, revealing his true position in life, and Eva realizes "this ees Heaven"

== Cast ==
- Vilma Bánky as Eva Petrie
- James Hall as James Stackpoole
- Fritzi Ridgeway as Mamie Chase
- Lucien Littlefield as Frank Chase
- Richard Tucker as E.D. Wallace

== Music ==
The film featured a theme song entitled “This Is Heaven,” with words by Jack Yellen and music by Harry Akst.

== Production background ==
Originally titled "Fifth Avenue Childs" and then "Fifth Avenue", Childs Restaurant management would not give Goldwyn permission to use their name, eventually he landed on This is Heaven.

Some scenes were filmed on location in New York City.

Like the majority of films in the early sound era, film was released in a silent version for theatres that had not yet converted to sound. Due to the public apathy towards silent film, the film's release was delayed so that some talking sequences could be filmed. Vilma had to have voice training which further delayed the process. By the time the film was released, in June 1929, the majority of new films were all-talking. Part-talkies were now seen as outmoded by the general public. Consequently, the film was not a success at the box-office. Bánky would make only three more films.

== Reception ==
In a review in the St. Louis Star, published July 1, 1929, it was declared that "Vilma's voice pleases, though it is less lovely than her blonde profile. Vilma's heaven is the tiny apartment the immigrant girl is getting in marrying James Hall, supposed chauffeur. The chauffeur is a millionaire....Best shots are the Ellis Island episodes.

== Preservation ==
With no holdings located in archives, This is Heaven is considered a lost film.

== See also ==
- List of early sound feature films (1926–1929)
