= Woman Chases Man =

1937 film by John G. Blystone

- Directed by: John G. Blystone
- Written by: Joseph Anthony; Manuel Seff; David Hertz; Lynn Root (story); Frank Fenton (story)
- Produced by: Samuel Goldwyn; George Haight (associate producer)
- Starring: Miriam Hopkins; Joel McCrea
- Cinematography: Gregg Toland
- Edited by: Daniel Mandell
- Music by: Alfred Newman
- Production company: Samuel Goldwyn Productions
- Distributed by: United Artists
- Release date: April 28, 1937
- Running time: 71 minutes
- Country: United States
- Language: English

Woman Chases Man is a 1937 American romantic comedy film directed by John G. Blystone and starring Miriam Hopkins and Joel McCrea.

== Plot ==
B.J. Nolan tries to get his millionaire son Kenneth to invest $100,000 in a housing development called Nolan Heights. However, B.J. has a long history of backing crazy projects (which is why his wife left all her money to her son in her will), so Kenneth turns him down.

Architect Virginia Travis, unaware that B.J. has no money and is besieged by process servers, tries to get him to hire her. After B.J. breaks the news to her, she faints, having not eaten in 49 hours. He takes her back to his mansion.

When she learns that B.J.'s son is wealthy, she decides to use her wiles to extract the money they need from him, aided by B.J. and her married friends Judy and Hunk. The latter two masquerade as B.J.'s servants (B.J. had to let his old servants go as he could not pay them) when Kenneth returns from a cruise with his girlfriend Nina and her "uncle" Henri. Nina is in fact a golddigger after Kenneth's money, while Henri is her secret lover.

Virginia first concocts a scheme to have Kenneth sign five checks for household expenses at once using a mechanical device, one of B.J.'s many failures. Kenneth signs without noticing that one check is for $100,000, but when Virginia and B.J. go to the bank, Mr. Judd informs them that Kenneth has to authorize any check over $1000. Defeated, they return home.

Meanwhile, Nina plots to get Kenneth drunk, so he will propose to her. Virginia has the same general idea. After a few drinks, she and Kenneth discover they like the same things and eventually begin kissing, prompting Virginia to have second thoughts about her scheme. She then passes out from drinking too much. Kenneth carries her off to deposit her in her bed, past a fuming Nina.

Shortly afterward, B.J. wakes her up and cajoles her into trying again for the money while his son is still somewhat drunk. She goes to Kenneth's room, but when Nina makes an appearance, hides in a tree outside his window. Her dressing gown gets caught in a branch. Kenneth comes out to free her. He finds the contract B.J. had drawn up and is eager to sign it. Virginia tries to stop him by dousing him with a bucket of water that B.J. had brought. Even in his now sober state and with Virginia confessing all, he still wants to finance the project. He then embraces her.

== Cast ==
- Miriam Hopkins as Virginia Travis
- Joel McCrea as Kenneth Nolan
- Charles Winninger as B.J. Nolan
- Erik Rhodes as Henri Saffron
- Ella Logan as Judy Williams
- Leona Maricle as Nina Tennyson
- Broderick Crawford as Hunk Williams
- Charles Halton as Mr. Judd

== Reception ==
Writing for Night and Day in 1937, Graham Greene gave the film a good review, describing it as "a blessed relief". Comparing the film to the screwball-comedy, Easy Living, Greene claims that Woman Chases Man accomplishes what Easy Living "set out to be." Whereas Easy Living was full of gaiety, the suffering present in Woman Chases Man provides the moments of genuine comedy.
