= The Dark Angel (1925 film) =

1925 film

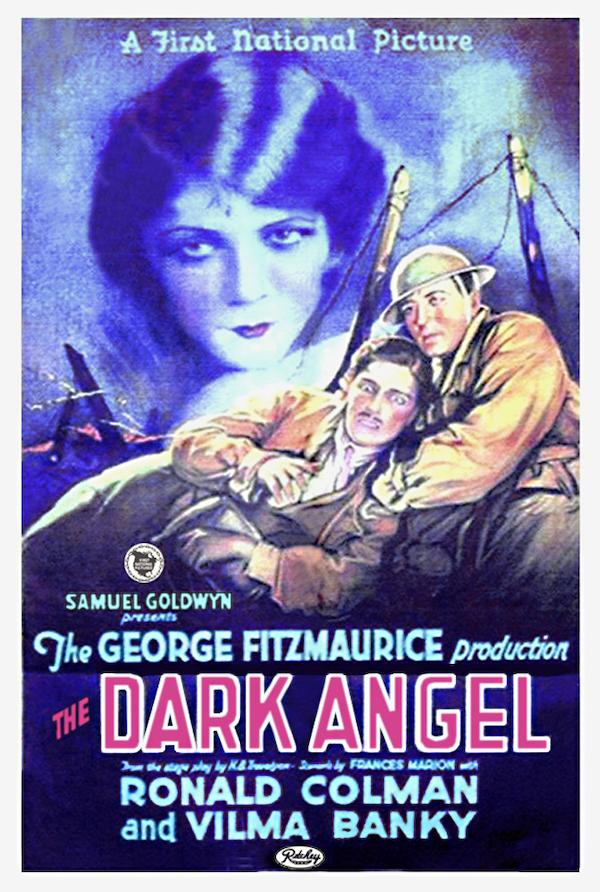
- Film poster
- Directed by: George Fitzmaurice
- Written by: Frances Marion (screenplay)
- Based on: The Dark Angel, a Play of Yesterday and To-day; 1925 play by H. B. Trevelyan
- Produced by: Samuel Goldwyn
- Starring: Ronald Colman; Vilma Bánky
- Cinematography: George S. Barnes
- Edited by: Stuart Heisler
- Production company: Samuel Goldwyn Productions
- Distributed by: First National Pictures
- Release date: September 27, 1925
- Running time: 80 minutes
- Country: United States
- Language: Silent (English intertitles)

The Dark Angel is a 1925 American silent drama film, based on the play The Dark Angel, a Play of Yesterday and To-day by H. B. Trevelyan, released by First National Pictures, and starring Ronald Colman, Vilma Bánky (in her first American film), and Wyndham Standing, directed by George Fitzmaurice.

== Plot ==
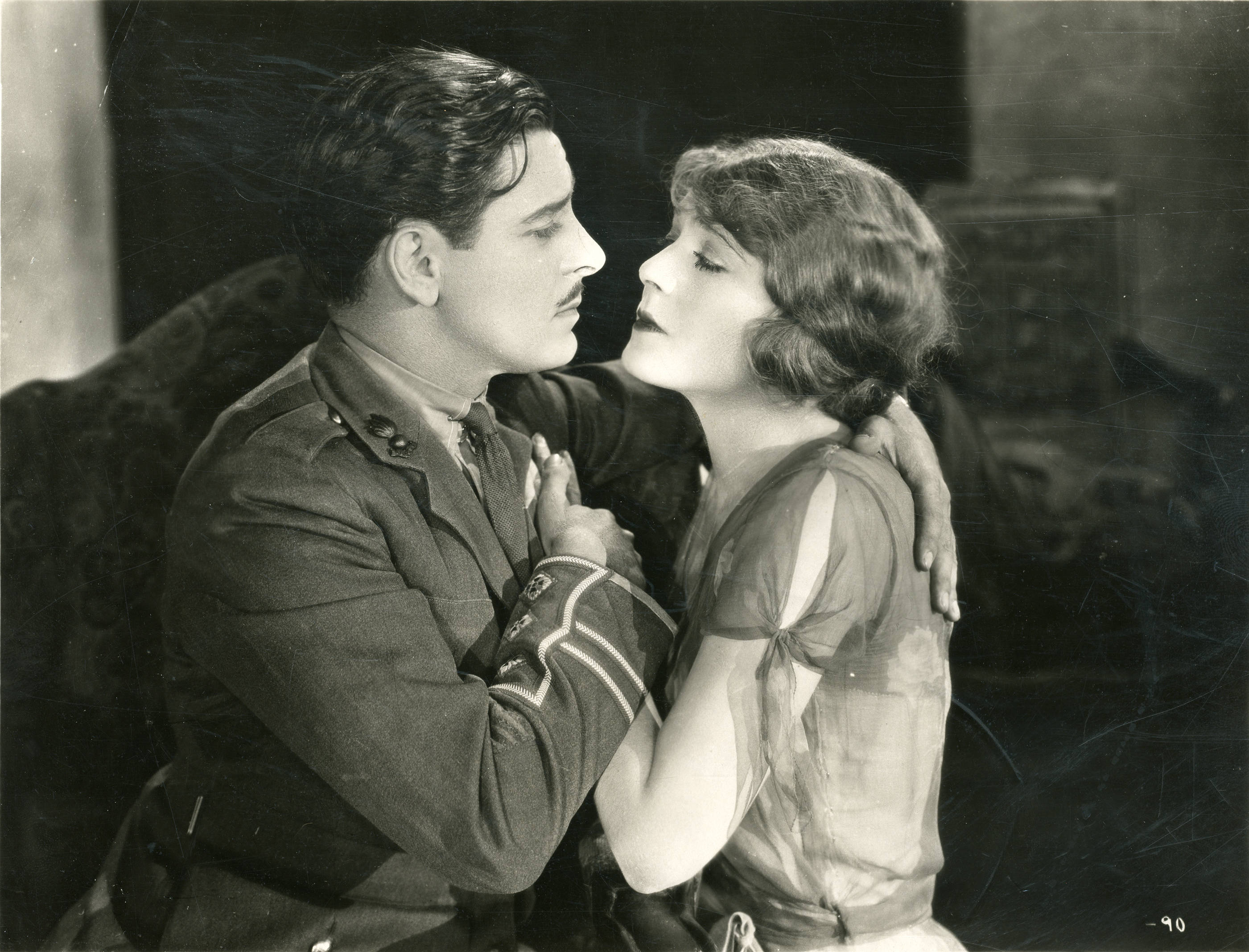
Ronald Colman and Vilma Bánky

During the First World War, Captain Alan Trent, while on leave in England with his fiancée Kitty Vane, is suddenly recalled to the front before being able to get a marriage license. Alan and Kitty spend a night of love at a country inn "without benefit of clergy" and he sets off.

At the front things go badly for Alan, who is blinded and becomes a Prisoner of War after being captured by the Germans. He is reported dead, and his friend, Captain Gerald Shannon, discreetly woos Kitty, seeking to soothe her grief with his gentle love.

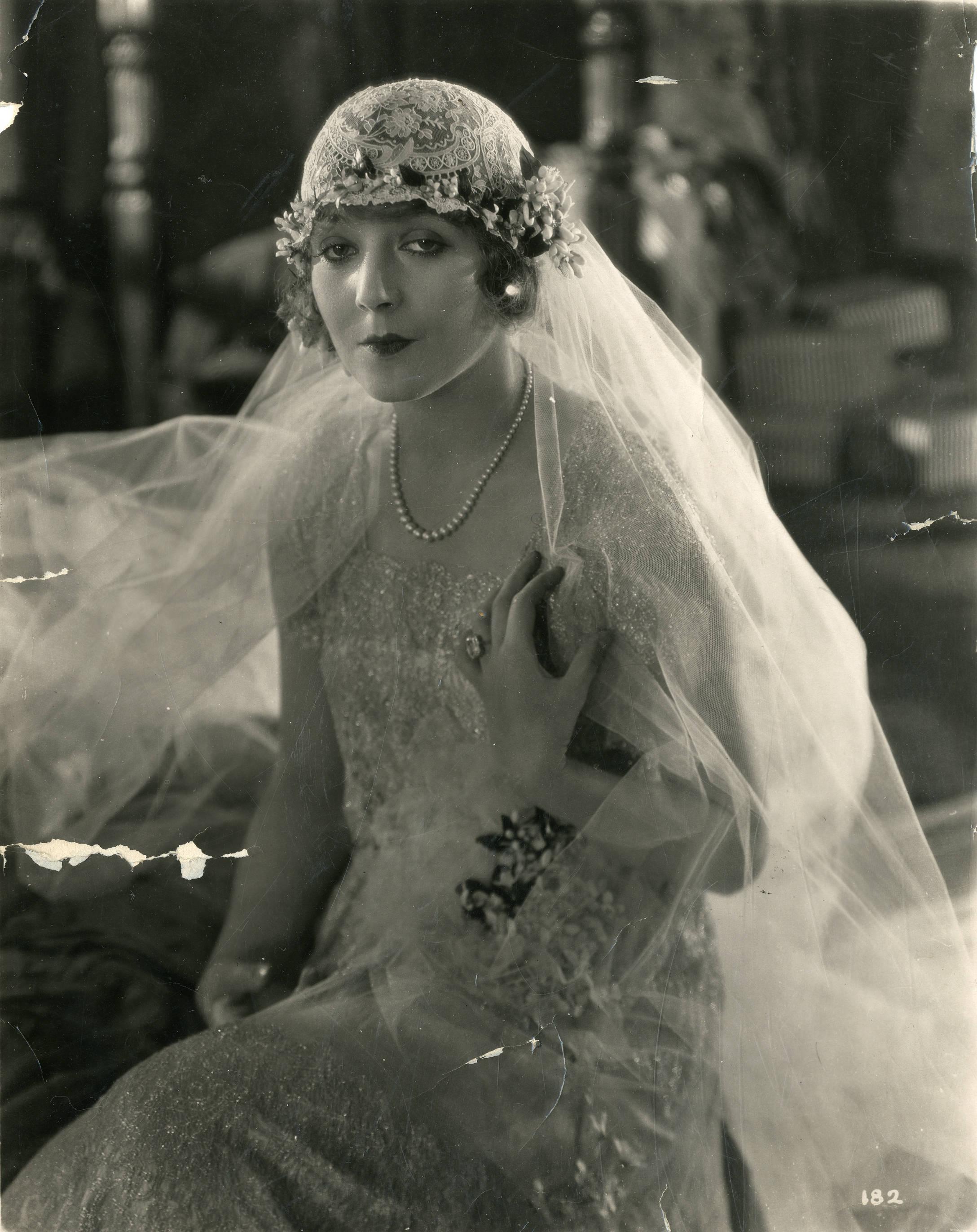
Vilma Bánky, 1925

After the war, however, Gerald discovers that Alan is still alive, in a remote corner of England, writing children's stories for a living. Loyal to his former comrade in arms, Gerald informs Kitty of Alan's reappearance. She goes to him, and Alan conceals his blindness and tells Kitty that he no longer cares for her. She sees through his deception, however, and they are reunited.

== Cast ==
- Ronald Colman as Captain Alan Trent
- Vilma Bánky as Kitty Vane
- Wyndham Standing as Gerald Shannon
- Frank Elliott as Lord Beaumont
- Charles Willis Lane as Sir Hubert Vane
- Helen Jerome Eddy as Miss Bottles
- Florence Turner as Roma
- Lassie Lou Ahern as a flower girl (uncredited)

== Reception ==
The film has a 100% fresh rating on Rotten Tomatoes, based on 9 positive contemporary reviews.

Mordaunt Hall's October 12, 1925, review for The New York Times conveys what made this film a compelling success 7 years after the end of the First World War.

== Preservation ==
The Library of Congress acquired reel 2 (out of 8) of The Dark Angel in 2015. Otherwise, it remains a lost film.

== See also ==
- List of lost films
