= Two Lovers (1928 film) =

1928 film

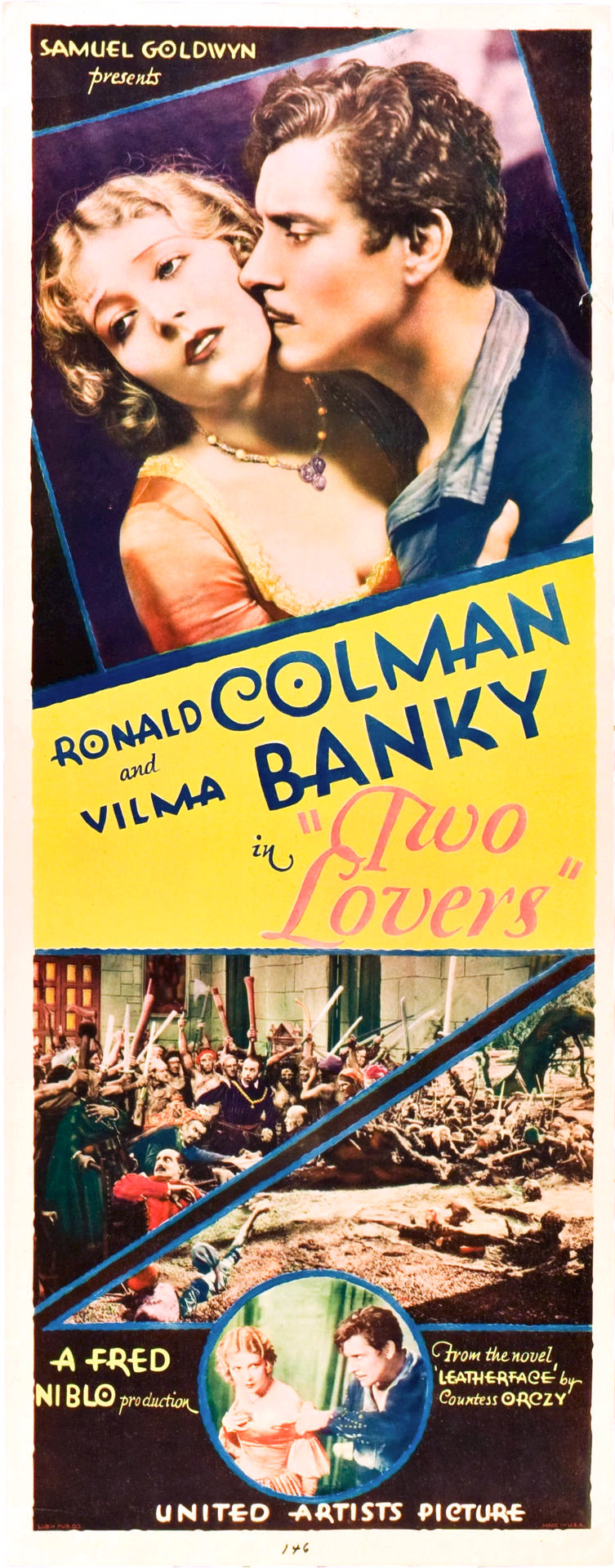
- Film poster
- Directed by: Fred Niblo
- Written by: Alice D. G. Miller (adaptation); John Colton (intertitles)
- Based on: Leatherface: A Tale of Old Flanders by Baroness Emma Orczy
- Produced by: Samuel Goldwyn
- Starring: Vilma Bánky; Ronald Colman
- Cinematography: George Barnes
- Music by: Hugo Riesenfeld
- Production company: Samuel Goldwyn Productions
- Distributed by: United Artists
- Release dates: March 23, 1928 (silent); August 27, 1928 (sound)
- Running time: 98 minutes
- Country: United States
- Languages: Sound (Synchronized) (English Intertitles)

Two Lovers is a 1928 American synchronized sound historical drama film directed by Fred Niblo. While the film has no audible dialog, it was released with a synchronized musical score with sound effects using both the sound-on-disc and sound-on-film process. The film stars Vilma Bánky, Ronald Colman, and Noah Beery. Based on the novel Leatherface: A Tale of Old Flanders by Baroness Emma Orczy, it was produced by Samuel Goldwyn.

== Plot ==
In 16th-century Flanders, under brutal Spanish oppression, the Dutch secretly rally behind William the Silent, Prince of Orange, determined to break free. His most devoted and enigmatic supporter is Leatherface, a masked patriot whose identity is hidden even from his own allies. Time and again, his interventions save the Prince from capture by the forces of the ruthless Duke of Azar.

Fearing rebellion, the Duke devises a scheme to gain control from within. He summons his beautiful niece, Donna Leonora de Vargas, and arranges her marriage to Mark Van Rycke, son of Meinherr Van Rycke, the Burgomaster of Ghent. Ostensibly a gesture of goodwill between conquerors and the conquered, the marriage is actually a ploy to place a spy inside the Dutch resistance. Although the Burgomaster and Madame Van Rycke are strong supporters of the Prince of Orange, their son Mark appears disinterested in the cause, frequenting taverns and socializing with Spanish soldiers.

Leonora is devastated by the proposed union, for she is already in love with Don Ramon de Linea, commander of the Spanish garrison in Ghent. Pressured by her uncle, she agrees to marry Mark, believing she can act as a spy. During their betrothal, she privately meets with Ramon, who assures her they will eliminate Mark once he has served his purpose. Mark, enchanted by Leonora's beauty, is taken with her despite her coldness and open confession that her heart belongs elsewhere.

Soon after their marriage, Ramon is slain in a duel with Leatherface, who had rescued Grete, an innocent Flemish girl, from Ramon's assault. Unaware of the circumstances, Leonora becomes consumed with hatred for the Dutch.

Her chance to serve Spain comes when she discovers that the Van Rycke household is a secret meeting place for the revolutionaries. She finds a list of conspirators and sets off for Brussels to deliver it to her uncle. Mark insists on accompanying her. Along the way, he engineers a breakdown at Dendermonde, forcing them to stay at an inn run by an Innkeeper and his wife. During their stay, Mark’s tenderness begins to soften Leonora’s feelings, and she finally surrenders to him—until she discovers a wound on his arm. Recognizing it as the wound Leatherface received from Ramon in their fatal fight, she realizes her husband and Leatherface are one and the same.

The Duke of Azar arrives at the inn with troops, answering Leonora’s summons. Mark, discovering her betrayal, seizes the list of conspirators hidden on her person and burns it in the fireplace. Nevertheless, Leonora salvages the list. But when she overhears Azar order the slaughter of Ghent’s citizens, she is horrified by Spanish cruelty and has a change of heart.

Escaping from the inn, she witnesses Mark being tortured to reveal the Prince of Orange’s location. She also learns that Ramon died in honorable combat. Leonora races through the night to Ghent, confesses her actions to her in-laws, and hands over the list of conspirators as proof of her sincerity.

Thanks to her warning, the patriots organize a daring assault on the Kasteel, the fortress guarding Ghent. Leonora lowers the drawbridge, allowing Flemish forces to cross a treacherous swamp and launch a surprise attack. Meanwhile, Azar and his troops, bringing Mark as prisoner, enter through the main gates. Mark is rescued just as he is about to be tortured again.

Azar is captured, but his life is spared on the condition that all Spanish troops withdraw from Flanders.

Though victorious, Mark remains bitter over Leonora’s betrayal. It is only when the Prince of Orange reveals her role in their victory that Mark’s heart begins to soften. Leonora appears and pleads for his forgiveness, declaring that it is he whom she truly loves.

At last, with war behind them and understanding restored, there are no longer any barriers to their happiness.

== Cast ==
- Ronald Colman as Mark Van Rycke
- Vilma Bánky as Donna Leonora de Vargas
- Noah Beery as The Duke of Azar
- Nigel De Brulier as The Prince of Orange
- Eugenie Besserer as Madame Van Rycke
- Virginia Bradford as Grete
- Helen Jerome Eddy as Inez
- Paul Lukas as Don Ramon de Linea
- Fred Esmelton as Meinherr Van Rycke, the Bailiff of Ghent
- Harry Allen as Jean
- Marcella Daly as Marda
- Scotty Mattraw as Dandermonde Innkeeper
- Lydia Yeamans Titus as Innkeeper's Wife
- Lon Poff (uncredited)
- Jerome Bonaparte "Blackjack" Ward (uncredited)

== Production ==
The working title of the film was Leatherface, an alias used by Colman's character and the title of the novel the film was based upon. The film premiered as a silent film at the Embassy Theatre in New York City in March 1928. By the time that the film was ready for general release in August 1928, the film had already been equipped with a synchronized musical soundtrack.

== Music ==
The film featured a theme song entitled "Lenora" with music by Hugo Riesenfeld and lyrics by L. Wolfe Gilbert. A second theme entitled “Grieving,” which was composed by Wayland Axtell, was also featured on the soundtrack.

== Preservation ==
An incomplete 35mm print with three reels missing survives in the Museum of Modern Art film archive, along with a 16mm viewing copy.

== See also ==
- List of early sound feature films (1926–1929)
