= Gregg Toland =

American cinematographer (1904–1948)

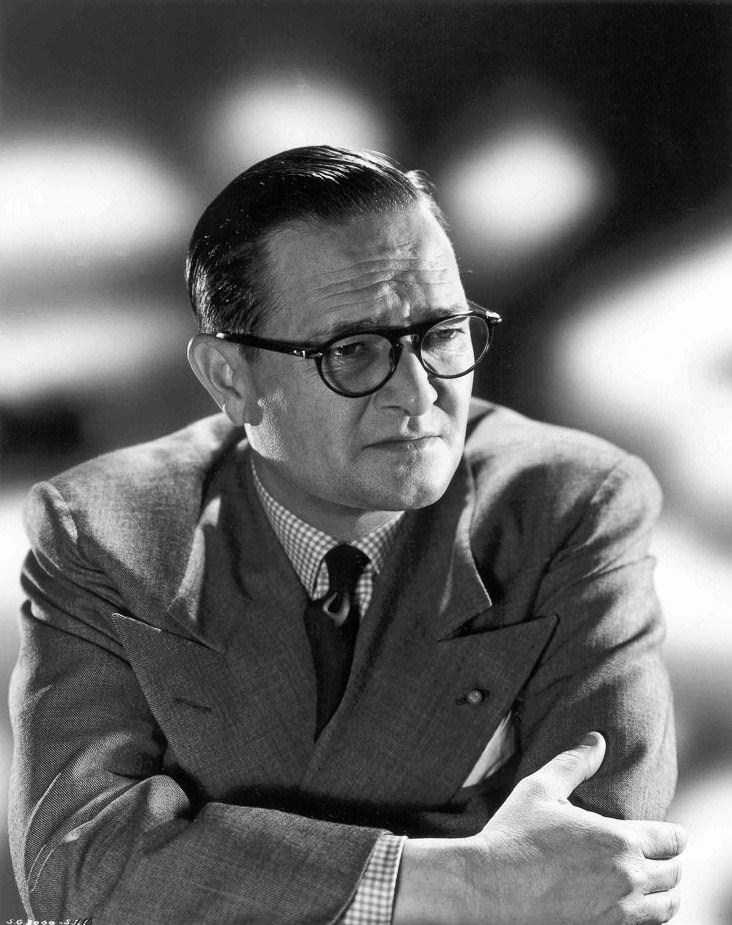
- Gregg Toland in 1947
- Born: Gregg Wesley Toland; May 29, 1904; Charleston, Illinois, U.S.
- Died: September 28, 1948 (aged 44); Los Angeles, California, U.S.
- Occupation: Cinematographer
- Years active: 1926–1948
- Known for: Innovative use of lighting and techniques such as deep focus
- Notable work: Citizen Kane; The Best Years of Our Lives; The Grapes of Wrath; The Long Voyage Home; Wuthering Heights
- Spouses: Helen Barclay (m. 1934; div. 1945) Virginia Thorpe (m. 1945)
- Children: 3

Gregg Wesley Toland (May 29, 1904 – September 28, 1948) was an American cinematographer known for his innovative use of techniques such as deep focus, examples of which can be found in his work on Orson Welles' Citizen Kane (1941), William Wyler's The Best Years of Our Lives (1946), and John Ford's The Grapes of Wrath, and The Long Voyage Home (both, 1940). He is also known for his work as a director of photography for Wuthering Heights (1939), The Westerner (1940), Ball of Fire (1941), The Outlaw (1943), Song of the South (1946) and The Bishop's Wife (1947).

Toland earned six Academy Award nominations for Best Cinematography, and won for his work on Wuthering Heights. He was voted one of the top ten most influential cinematographers in the history of film by the International Cinematographers Guild in 2003.

== Career ==
Toland was born in Charleston, Illinois, on May 29, 1904, to Jennie, a housekeeper, and Frank Toland. His mother moved to California several years after his parents divorced in 1910.

Toland got his start in the film industry at the age of 15, working as an office boy at the Fox studio. He became an assistant cameraman a year later.

His trademark chiaroscuro, side-lit style originated by accident: while shooting the short film The Life and Death of 9413: a Hollywood Extra (1928), one of two available 400W bulbs burned out, leaving only a single bulb for lighting.

During the 1930s, Toland became the youngest cameraman in Hollywood, but soon became one of its most sought-after cinematographers. Over a seven-year span (1936–1942), he was nominated five times for the Academy Award for Best Cinematography, winning only once, for his work on Wuthering Heights (1939). He worked with many of the leading directors of his era, including John Ford, Howard Hawks, Erich von Stroheim, King Vidor, Orson Welles and William Wyler.

=== Service during World War II ===
When the Office of the Coordinator of Information (predecessor to the Office of Strategic Services and later the Central Intelligence Agency) was created by Franklin Delano Roosevelt before the United States' entry into World War II, Toland was recruited to work in the agency's film unit. Toland was commissioned as a lieutenant in the Navy's camera department, which led to his only work as a director, December 7th (1943). This documentary of the attack on Pearl Harbor, which Toland co-directed with John Ford, is so realistic in its restaged footage that many today mistake it for actual attack footage. This 82-minute film was trimmed by censors into a 20-minute version, which took the Academy Award for Best Documentary (Short Subject), and was released in its entirety in 1991.

== Citizen Kane ==
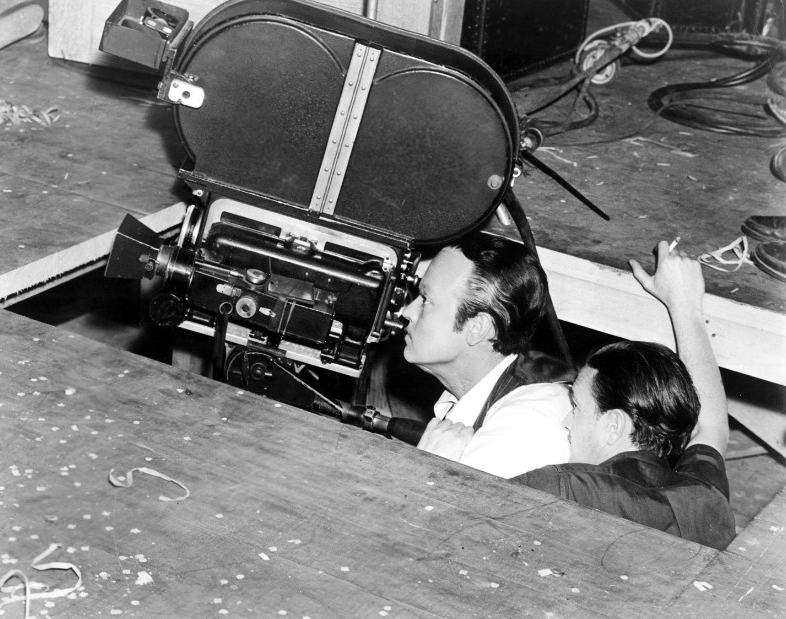
Orson Welles and Gregg Toland at work on Citizen Kane (1941); the camera appears to be one of the very few brand-new Mitchell Camera Corp BNCs which were made before the World War II embargo on the manufacture of new production cameras (excepting those intended for the U.S. Army Signal Corps and U.S. allies).

Some film historians believe Citizen Kane's visual brilliance was due primarily to Toland's contributions, rather than director Orson Welles'. Many Welles scholars, however, maintain that the visual style of Kane is similar to many of Welles's other films, and hence should be considered the director's work. Nevertheless, the Welles movies that most resemble Citizen Kane (The Magnificent Ambersons, The Stranger, and Touch of Evil) were shot by Toland collaborators Stanley Cortez and Russell Metty (at RKO).

In a 1970 interview on The Dick Cavett Show, Welles told the story of how he met Toland, whom Welles considered "the greatest cameraman who ever lived". Although Citizen Kane was Welles's first feature, it was Toland—whom Welles already knew by reputation—who sought out Welles:

[Toland] came to my office and said, "I want to work in your picture. My name is Toland." And I said, "Why do you, Mr. Toland?" And he said, "Because you've never made a picture. You don't know what cannot be done." So I said, "But I really don't! Can you tell me?" And [Toland] said, "There's nothing to it." And [he] gave me a day-and-a-half lesson—and he was right!

While shooting Kane, Welles and Toland (among others) insisted that Welles gave lighting instructions that fall normally under the director of photography's responsibility. Many of the transitions in the film are done as lighting cues on set (such as the transition at the opening of the film from the outside of Xanadu into Kane's bedroom for his death), where lights are dimmed up and down on stage. Apparently, Welles was unaware that one could achieve the effects optically on a film so he instructed the crew to dim the lights as they would have done on a theater production, which led to the unique dissolves. Different areas of the frame dissolve at different times, based on the lighting cue. However, the visuals were truly a collaboration, as Toland contributed great amounts of technical expertise that Welles needed so that he could achieve his vision. Years later, Welles acknowledged: "Toland was advising him on camera placement and lighting effects secretly so the young director would not be embarrassed in front of the highly experienced crew."

=== Cinematography innovations ===
Toland's techniques were revolutionary in the art of cinematography. Cinematographers before him used a shallow depth of field to separate the various planes on the screen, creating an impression of space as well as stressing what mattered in the frame by leaving the rest (the foreground or background) out of focus.

In Toland's lighting schemes, shadow became a much more compelling tool, both dramatically and pictorially, to separate the foreground from the background and so to create space within a two-dimensional frame while keeping all of the picture in focus. According to Toland, this visual style was more comparable with what the eyes see in real life since vision blurs what is not looked at rather than what is.

For John Ford's The Long Voyage Home (1940), Toland leaned more heavily on back-projection to create his deep focus compositions, such as the shot of the island women singing to entice the men of the SS Glencairn. He continued to develop the technologies that would allow for him to create his images in Citizen Kane.

=== Deep focus and lighting techniques ===
Toland innovated extensively on Citizen Kane, creating deep focus on a sound-stage, collaborating with set designer Perry Ferguson so ceilings would be visible in the frame by stretching bleached muslin to stand in as a ceiling, allowing placement of the microphone closer to the action without being seen in frame. He also modified the Mitchell Camera to allow a wider range of movement, especially from low angles. ″It was Toland who devised a remote-control system for focusing his camera lens without having to get in the way of the camera operator who would now be free to pan and tilt the camera."

The main way to achieve deep focus was closing down the aperture, which required increasing the lighting intensity, lenses with better light transmission, and faster film stock. On Citizen Kane, the cameras and coated lenses used were of Toland's own design working in conjunction with engineers from Caltech. His lenses were treated with Vard Opticoat to reduce glare and increase light transmission. He used the Kodak Super XX film stock, which was, at the time, the fastest film available, with an ASA film speed of 100. Toland had worked closely with a Kodak representative during the stock's creation before its release in October 1938, and was one of the first cinematographers using it heavily on set.

Lens apertures employed on most productions were usually within the f/2.3 to f/3.5 range; Toland shot his scenes in between f/8 and f/16. This was possible because several elements of technology came together at once: the technicolor three strip process, which required the development of more powerful lights, had been developed and the more powerful Carbon Arc light was beginning to be used. By utilizing these lights with the faster stock, Toland was able to achieve apertures previously unattainable on a stage shoot.

=== Optical print shots and in-camera composites ===
Gregg Toland collaborated on a number of shots with special-effects cinematographer Linwood G. Dunn. Although these looked like they were using deep focus, they were actually a composite of two different shots. Some of these shots were composited with an optical printer, a device which Dunn improved upon over the years, which explains why foreground and background are both in focus even though the lenses and film stock used in 1941 could not allow for such depth of field.

But Toland strongly disliked this technique, since he felt he was "duping," (i.e. a copy of a copy) thereby lowering the quality of his shots. Thus other shots (like the shot of Susan Alexander Kane's bedroom after her suicide attempt, with a glass in the foreground and Kane entering the room in the background) were in-camera composites, meaning the film was exposed twice—another technique that Linwood Dunn improved upon.

=== Citizen Kane and The Long Voyage Home ===
Toland had already had experience with heavy in-camera compositing, and many of the shots in Citizen Kane look similar in composition and dynamics to a number of shots in Ford's The Long Voyage Home.

For instance, both movies contain shots that create an artificial lighting situation such that a character is lit in the background and walks or runs through dark areas to the foreground, where his arrival triggers, off-screen, a light not on before. The result is so visually dramatic because a character moves, only barely visible, through vast pools of shadow, only to exit the shadow very close to the camera, where his whole face is suddenly completely lit. This use of much more shadow than light, soon one of the main techniques of low-key lighting, heavily influenced film noir.

The Long Voyage Home and Citizen Kane share a number of other striking similarities:

- Both films allowed lenses at times to distort faces in close-up, especially during low-key lighting sequences described above.
- Sets, both interiors and exteriors, were lit mostly from the floor instead of from the rafters high above. A radical departure from Hollywood's traditional lighting, this technique also took much longer to execute, thus contributing significantly to production costs. However, the effect was strikingly more realistic, since light sources placed closer to the characters allowed softer lighting, which lights placed far above the set could not produce.
- Both directors, Welles as well as Ford, put Toland's credit as cinematographer on screen at the same time as their own credit as director (director/producer in Welles's case), an unusual and conspicuously generous tribute; in both films, Toland's credit was also the same size as the director's.

=== Credit ===
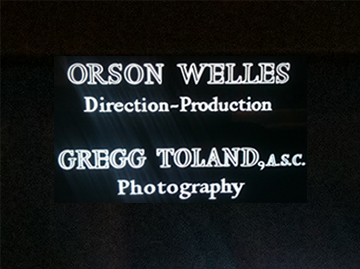
The final ending title card for Citizen Kane, placing Toland on same card as Orson Welles, the director, because Welles felt he deserved it.

In addition to sharing a title card with Toland on Kane — an indication of the high esteem the director held for his cameraman — Welles also gave him a cameo in the film as the reporter who is slow to ask questions when Kane returns from Europe. Welles called Toland: "the greatest gift any director—young or old—could ever, ever have. And he never tried to impress on us that he was performing miracles. He just went ahead and performed them. I was calling on him to do things only a beginner could be ignorant enough to think anybody could ever do, and there he was, doing them."

Toland was the subject of an "Annals of Hollywood" article in The New Yorker, "The Cameraman", by Hilton Als (June 19, 2006, p. 46).

== Other works ==
Although Citizen Kane is his most highly regarded achievement, his style was much more varied. For The Grapes of Wrath (1940), he took inspiration from Dorothea Lange's photographs, achieving a rare (for Hollywood) gritty and realist look.

For one of his final projects, Toland turned to Technicolor film. Made for Disney, Song of the South (1946) combined animation with live action in bright, deeply saturated Technicolor. In The Best Years of Our Lives (also 1946), his deep focus cinematography served to highlight all the aspects of the characters' lives.

Just before his death, he was concentrating on the "ultimate focus" lens to make near and far objects equally distinct. "Just before he died he had worked out a new lens with which he had made spectacular shots. He carried in his wallet a strip of film taken with this lens, of which he was very proud. It was a shot of a face three inches from the lens, filling one-third of the left side of the frame. Three feet from the lens, in the center of the foreground, was another face, and then, over a hundred yards away was the rear wall of the studio, showing telephone wires and architectural details. Everything was in focus, from three inches to infinity".

== Death ==
On September 28, 1948, Toland died in his sleep from a coronary thrombosis. He was 44 years old.

== Legacy ==
The results of a survey conducted in 2003 by the International Cinematographers Guild placed Toland in the top ten of history's most influential cinematographers.

The 2006 Los Angeles edition of CineGear assembled a distinguished panel composed of Owen Roizman, László Kovács, Daryn Okada, Rodrigo Prieto, Russell Carpenter, Dariusz Wolski and others. Called "Dialogue With ASC Cinematographers", the panel was asked to name two or three other cinematographers, living or dead, who had influenced their work or whom they considered to be the best of the best. Each panel member cited Gregg Toland first.

== Filmography ==
As a cinematographer

Year	Title	Director	Notes
1928	The Life and Death of 9413: A Hollywood Extra	Robert Florey; Slavko Vorkapić	co-cinematographer with Paul Ivano
1929	Queen Kelly	Erich Von Stroheim	uncredited cinematographer of European ending directed by Richard Boleslawski
1929	The Trespasser	Edmund Goulding	co-cinematographer with George Barnes
1929	Bulldog Drummond	F. Richard Jones	co-cinematographer with George Barnes
1929	This Is Heaven	Alfred Santell	co-cinematographer with George Barnes
1929	Condemned	Wesley Ruggles	co-cinematographer with George Barnes
1930	Raffles	George Fitzmaurice	co-cinematographer with George Barnes
1930	Whoopee!	Thornton Freeland	co-cinematographer with Lee Garmes and Ray Rennahan
1930	The Devil to Pay!	George Fitzmaurice	co-cinematographer with George Barnes
1931	Indiscreet	Leo McCarey	co-cinematographer with Ray June
1931	One Heavenly Night	George Fitzmaurice	co-cinematographer with George Barnes
1931	Street Scene	King Vidor	co-cinematographer with George Barnes
1931	Palmy Days	A. Edward Sutherland	
1931	The Unholy Garden	George Fitzmaurice	
1931	Tonight or Never	Mervyn LeRoy	
1932	Play Girl	Ray Enright	
1932	Man Wanted	William Dieterle	
1932	The Tenderfoot	Ray Enright	
1932	The Washington Masquerade	Charles Brabin	
1932	The Kid from Spain	Leo McCarey	
1933	The Masquerader	Richard Wallace	
1933	The Nuisance	Jack Conway	
1933	Tugboat Annie	Mervyn LeRoy	
1933	Roman Scandals	Frank Tuttle	
1934	Nana	Dorothy Arzner; George Fitzmaurice	
1934	Lazy River	George B. Seitz	
1934	We Live Again	Rouben Mamoulian	
1934	Forsaking All Others	W. S. Van Dyke	
1935	Les Misérables	Richard Boleslawski	
1935	Public Hero No. 1	J. Walter Ruben	
1935	The Dark Angel	Sidney Franklin	
1935	Splendor	Elliott Nugent	
1935	Mad Love	Karl Freund	
1935	The Wedding Night	King Vidor	
1936	The Road to Glory	Howard Hawks	
1936	These Three	William Wyler	
1936	Come and Get It	Howard Hawks; William Wyler	co-cinematographer with Rudolph Maté
1936	Beloved Enemy	H. C. Potter	
1937	History Is Made at Night	Frank Borzage	co-cinematographer with David Abel
1937	Woman Chases Man	John G. Blystone	
1937	Dead End	William Wyler	
1938	The Goldwyn Follies	George Marshall	
1938	Kidnapped	Alfred L. Werker	
1938	The Cowboy and the Lady	H. C. Potter	
1939	Intermezzo	Gregory Ratoff	
1939	Wuthering Heights	William Wyler	
1939	Raffles	Sam Wood	
1939	They Shall Have Music	Archie Mayo	
1940	The Grapes of Wrath	John Ford	
1940	The Long Voyage Home	John Ford	
1940	The Westerner	William Wyler	
1940	The Outlaw	Howard Hughes	released 1943
1941	Citizen Kane	Orson Welles	
1941	The Little Foxes	William Wyler	
1941	Ball of Fire	Howard Hawks	
1943	December 7th	Gregg Toland; John Ford	co-director and cinematographer
1946	The Best Years of Our Lives	William Wyler	
1946	Song of the South	Harve Foster	
1946	The Kid from Brooklyn	Norman Z. McLeod	
1947	The Bishop's Wife	Henry Koster	
1948	A Song is Born	Howard Hawks	
1948	Enchantment	Irving Reis	

== Awards and nominations ==
Academy Awards

Year	Category	Film	Result	Ref.
1935	Best Cinematography	Les Misérables	Nominated	
1937	Best Cinematography	Dead End	Nominated	
1939	Best Cinematography, Black-and-White	Wuthering Heights	Won	
1939	Best Cinematography, Black-and-White	Intermezzo: A Love Story	Nominated	
1940	Best Cinematography, Black-and-White	The Long Voyage Home	Nominated	
1941	Best Cinematography, Black-and-White	Citizen Kane	Nominated	
1943	Documentary Short Subject	December 7th: The Movie	Won	
