= The Magic Flame =

1927 film by Henry King

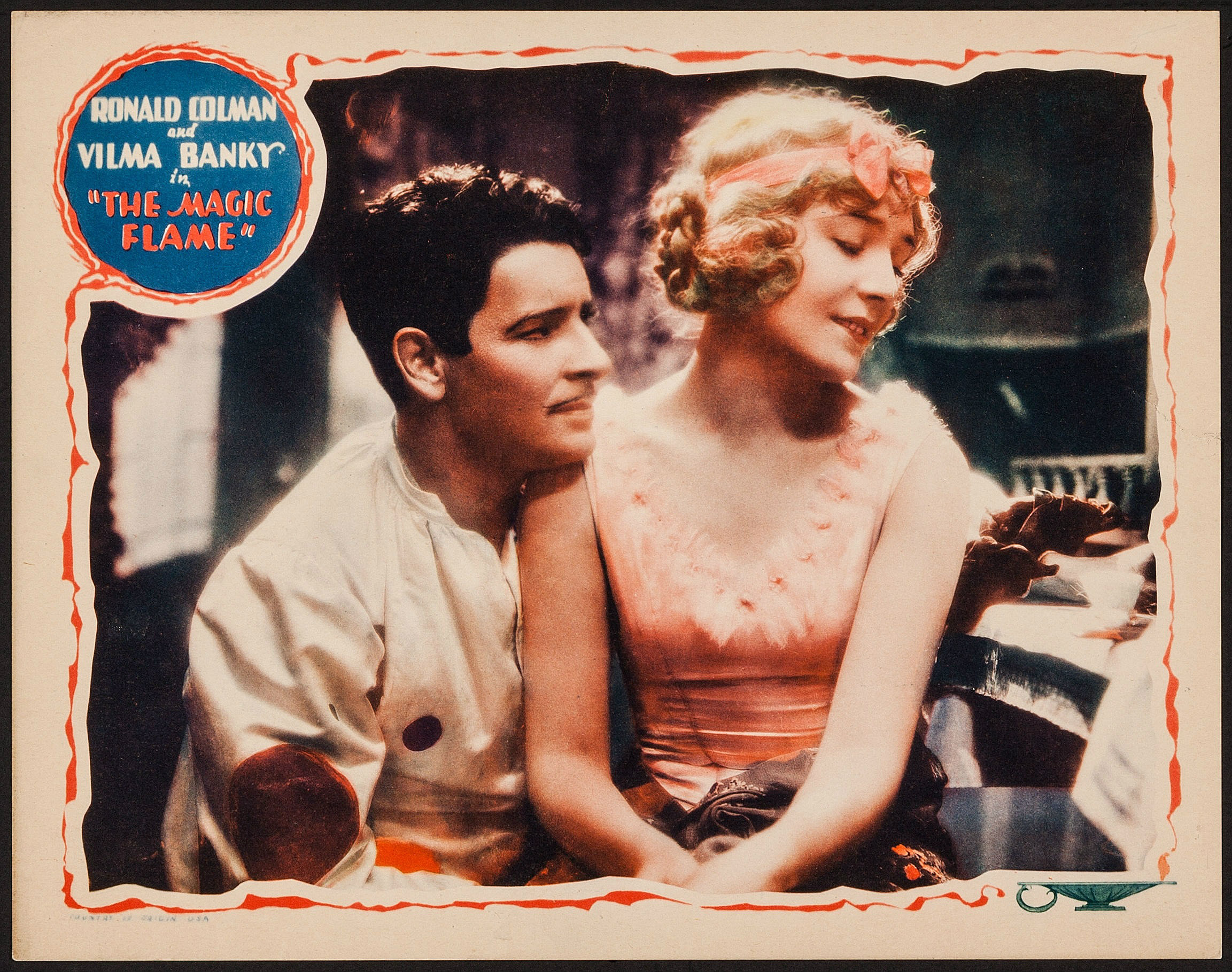
- Lobby card
- Directed by: Henry King
- Written by: George Marion Jr. (titles); June Mathis (continuity); Bess Meredyth (writer); Nellie Revell (titles)
- Based on: König Harlekin by Rudolph Lothar
- Produced by: Samuel Goldwyn
- Starring: Ronald Colman; Vilma Bánky
- Cinematography: George Barnes
- Music by: Sigmund Spaeth
- Production company: Samuel Goldwyn Productions
- Distributed by: United Artists
- Release date: September 18, 1927 (U.S.)
- Running time: 9 reels
- Country: United States
- Language: Silent (English intertitles)

The Magic Flame is a 1927 American silent drama film directed by Henry King, produced by Samuel Goldwyn, and based on the 1900 play Konig Harlekin by Rudolph Lothar. George Barnes was nominated at the 1st Academy Awards for Best Cinematography for his work in The Magic Flame, The Devil Dancer, and Sadie Thompson. The film promoted itself as the Romeo and Juliet of the circus upon its release.

== Cast ==
- Ronald Colman as Tito the Clown
- Vilma Bánky as Bianca, the acrobat
- Agostino Borgato as The Ringmaster
- Gustav von Seyffertitz as The Chancellor
- Harvey Clark as The Aide
- Shirley Palmer as The Wife
- Cosmo Kyrle Bellew as The Husband
- George Davis as The Utility Man
- André Cheron as The Manager
- Vadim Uraneff as The Visitor
- Meurnier-Surcouf as Sword Swallower
- Raoul Paoli as Weight Thrower
- William Bakewell
- Lucille Ballart
- Austen Jewell

== Preservation ==
The Magic Flame is now considered to be a lost film. The first five reels are rumored to exist at the George Eastman Museum, though this is disputed.

== See also ==
- List of lost films
- List of incomplete or partially lost films
