= The Devil to Pay! =

1930 film

- Directed by: George Fitzmaurice
- Screenplay by: Frederick Lonsdale; Benjamin Glazer
- Produced by: Samuel Goldwyn
- Starring: Ronald Colman; Loretta Young
- Cinematography: George Barnes; Gregg Toland
- Edited by: Grant Whytock
- Music by: Alfred Newman
- Production company: Samuel Goldwyn Productions
- Distributed by: United Artists
- Release date: December 18, 1930
- Running time: 97 minutes
- Country: United States
- Language: English

The Devil to Pay! is a 1930 American pre-Code romantic drama film directed by George Fitzmaurice and starring Ronald Colman, Frederick Kerr, Myrna Loy and Loretta Young. It was written by Frederick Lonsdale and Benjamin Glazer.

== Plot ==
In May 1930, Willie Hale sells his "furniture and effects" in Kenya Colony and returns home to England, where he buys a dog with most of his remaining money. Lord Leeland, his wealthy father, is frustrated with Willie's many failed ventures but gives him £100 in spending money.

After seeing his old girlfriend, theatre star Mary Crayle, Willie meets family friend and heiress Dorothy Hope. He takes Dorothy and his sister Susan to the Derby, where he wins a great deal of money on a 50-to-1 longshot. Dorothy then breaks her engagement to Grand Duke Paul because she finds the bankrupt Willie far more charming.

Willie is reluctant to become romantically involved with Dorothy, but when her father insists that he will disinherit her if she marries Willie, he proposes to her. She accepts, but only if he will promise to never see Mary again. Willie is unable to deliver the news to Mary by letter or telephone, so he waits for her outside the theater. At her home, he is finally able to tell her about his engagement.

Mr. Hope hires a detective agency to watch Willie. He has Dorothy call Mary on the telephone, and when Willie answers, Dorothy is heartbroken. When Willie tries to explain, Dorothy pays him £5,000, assuming that he had been merely seeking her inheritance. She is astonished when he leaves with the check, whistling. However, Willie does not intend to keep the money. After he hears that Paul is destitute, he sends the money to him under Dorothy's name. Paul sends a note to Dorothy to thank her, which delights Dorothy and disillusions her father. Dorothy and Willie reconcile before he sails for New Zealand to start a sheep farm. Dorothy's father offers to buy Willie a farm in England, and Lord Leeland is happy to hear that it will be Mr. Hope whose money will be lost if Willie fails in yet another business venture.

== Cast ==
- Ronald Colman as Willie Hale
- Frederick Kerr as Lord Leland
- Loretta Young as Dorothy Hope
- David Torrence as Mr. Hope
- Florence Britton as Susan Hale
- Myrna Loy as Mary Crayle
- Paul Cavanagh as Grand Duke Paul
- Crauford Kent as Arthur

== Production ==
Samuel Goldwyn recruited playwright Frederick Lonsdale to write a story after meeting him on a visit to London. Goldwyn considered the film an ideal vehicle for Colman to follow his success in his previous film, Bulldog Drummond (1929). Constance Cummings was originally cast in the female lead but was replaced because her American accent was too strong for the British setting. Goldwyn also replaced original director Irving Cummings after two weeks because he was unhappy with the standard of production.

== Reception ==
Mordaunt Hall considered it one of the ten best films of the year in his New York Times review, writing:

This comedy had freshness and Mr. Lonsdale's witty dialogue was just as effective from the screen as it has been for long from the stage. It was a light but charming affair with a really clever dénouement. The principal role was splendidly acted by Ronald Colman ...

== Bibliography ==
- Berg, A. Scott Goldwyn: A Biography. Pan Books, 1999.
