= Vilma Bánky =

Hungarian-American film actress (1901–1991)

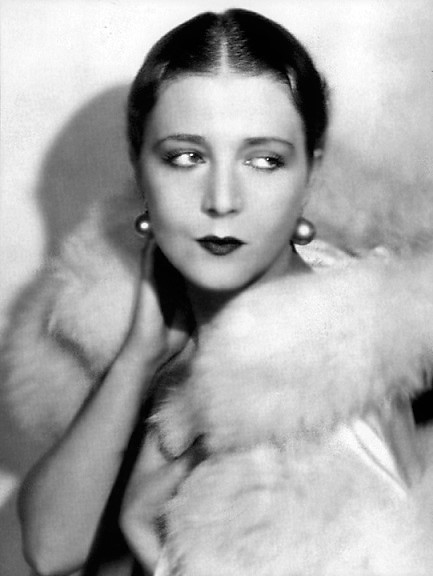
- Bánky in 1929
- Born: Vilma Koncsics; 9 January 1901; Nagydorog, Tolna County, Austria-Hungary (now Hungary)
- Died: 18 March 1991 (aged 90); Los Angeles, California, U.S.
- Occupation: Actress
- Years active: 1919–1933
- Spouse: Rod La Rocque (m. 1927; died 1969)

Vilma Bánky (born Vilma Koncsics; 9 January 1901 – 18 March 1991) was a Hungarian-American silent film actress. Although her acting career began in Budapest, and she later worked in France, Austria, and Germany, Bánky was best known for her roles in the American films The Eagle (1925) and The Son of the Sheik (1926) with Rudolph Valentino, and for several romantic teamings with Ronald Colman.

== Early life ==
Born in Nagydorog, Tolna County, Hungary, she was registered as Vilma Koncsics. Vilma Bánky is her later stage name, which she adopted at the beginning of her acting career.

She was born to Katalin Ulbert, an actress, and János Koncsics, a civil servant and later police sergeant. When the family moved to Budapest, they first lived in a rented apartment in Práter Street in Józsefváros before settling in the Lónyaytelep area of Pestszentlőrinc on Teleki Street. She completed her early education at the Egressy Street Civic School and later attended a commercial school. After finishing her studies, she worked as a typist.

== Career ==
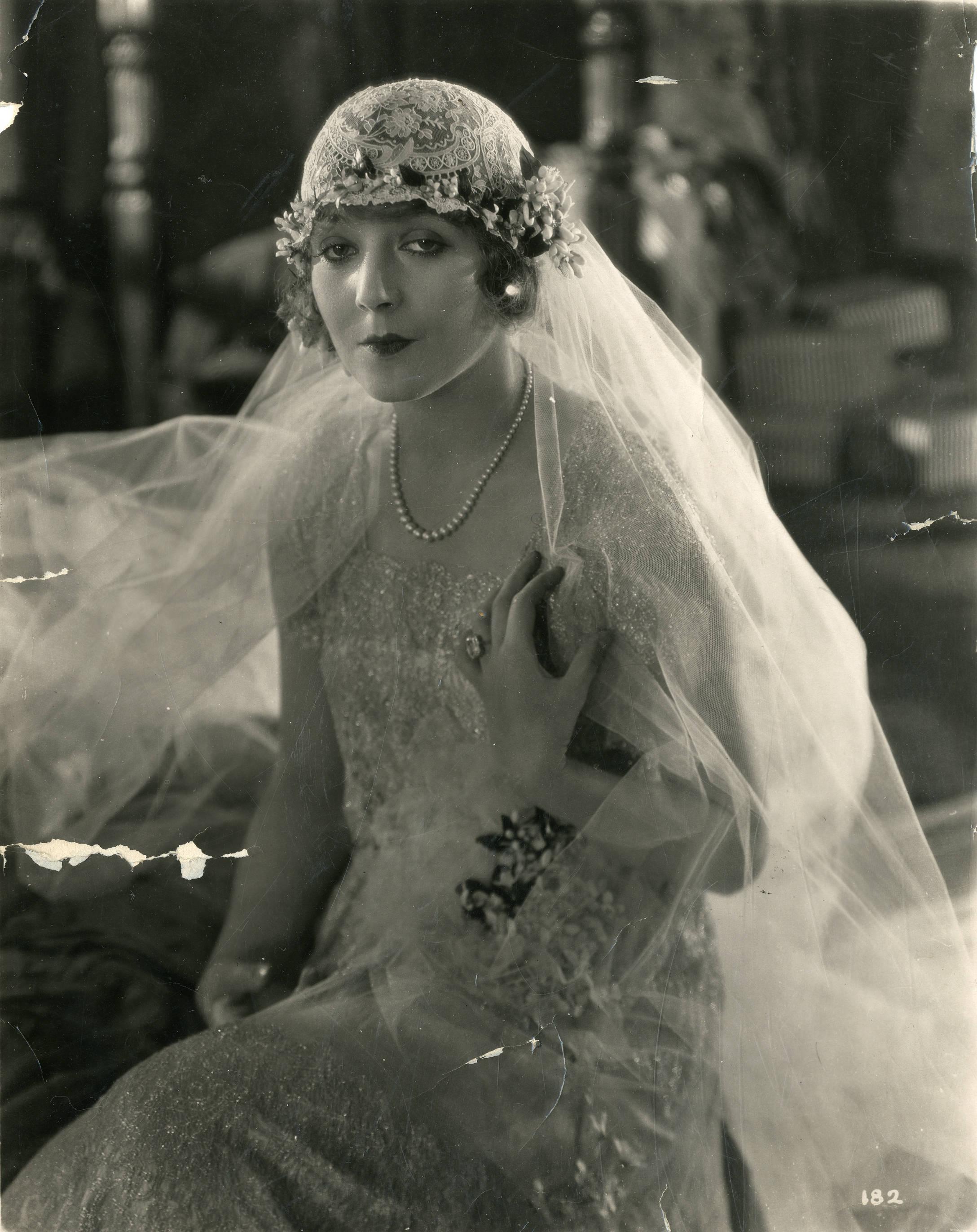
Photo from The Dark Angel, 1925

She was hailed as "The Hungarian Rhapsody" and was an immediate hit with American audiences. The New York Times remarked in its review of her first American film, The Dark Angel (1925), that she "is a young person of rare beauty ... so exquisite that one is not in the least surprised that she is never forgotten by Hillary Trent" (the movie's leading male character who decides to allow his family and fiancée to believe him dead rather than place what he perceives as the burden on them of a life caring for a blinded war veteran).

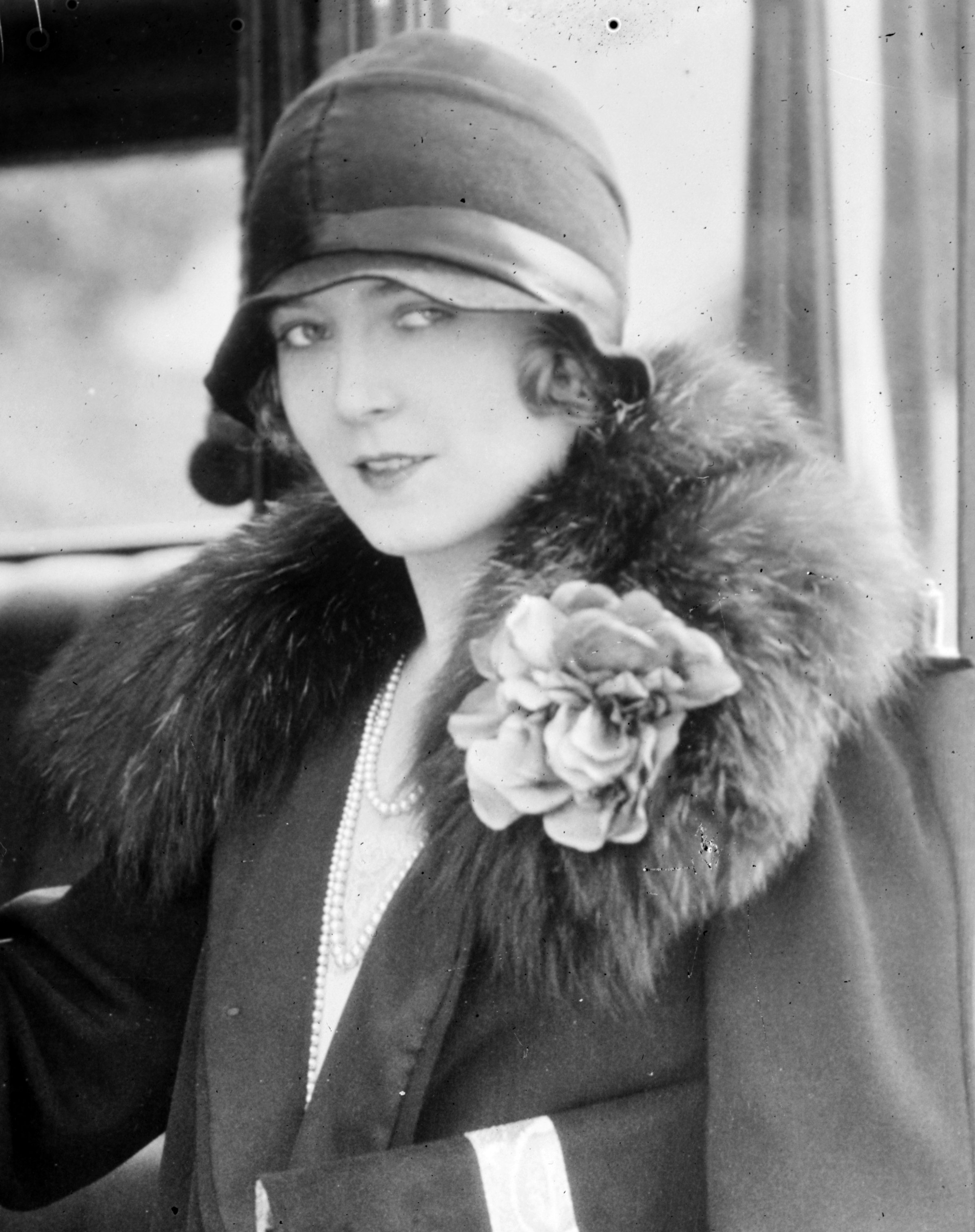
Vilma Bánky, 1920s

She appeared opposite silent film star Rudolph Valentino in The Eagle (1925) and The Son of the Sheik (1926). Valentino reportedly was fascinated by Vilma, and chose her as the leading lady in the films. She also appeared opposite Ronald Colman in a series of love stories, including The Dark Angel and The Winning of Barbara Worth. It is commonly believed that her thick Hungarian accent led, with the advent of sound, to her career being cut short; however, she began losing interest in films and wanted to settle down with Rod La Rocque and simply be his wife. In 1930, she announced her retirement. She came out of retirement briefly in 1933 to star in The Rebel with Luis Trenker.

Of her 24 films, eight exist in their entirety (Hotel Potemkin, Der Zirkuskönig (The King of the Circus) with Max Linder, The Son of the Sheik, The Eagle, The Winning of Barbara Worth, The Night of Love, A Lady to Love, and The Rebel), and three exist in fragments (Tavaszi szerelem in scattered bits, the first five reels of The Magic Flame, and an incomplete copy of Two Lovers).

== Personal life and death ==
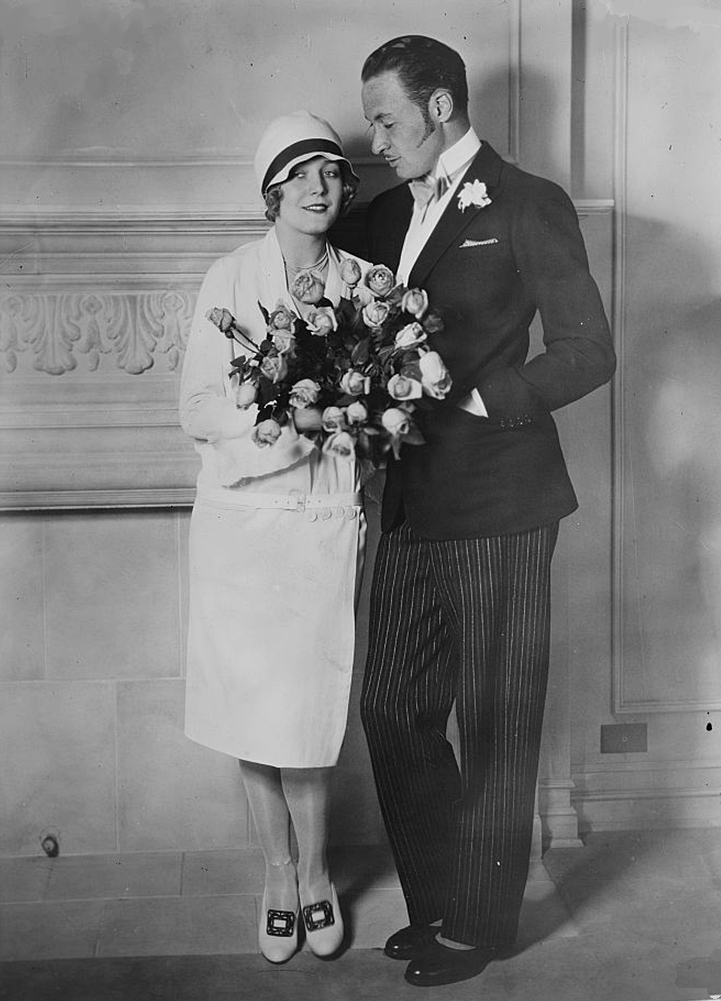
Bánky and husband Rod La Rocque in 1927

She married actor Rod La Rocque in 1927; they remained married until his death in 1969. She became an accomplished golfer, while La Rocque devoted his time to real estate. The couple had no children, but established the Banky-La Rocque Foundation to fund various educational and artistic endeavors, which donated millions well after Bánky died.

Bánky died on 18 March 1991, from cardiopulmonary failure, aged 90, but notice of her death was not made public until the following year. She was reportedly upset that no one had come to visit her in her last years, and directed her lawyer to make no mention of her death. While this is what was reported in the newspapers, she did in fact have many visitors. Her ashes were scattered at sea where her husband's had been consigned.

For her contributions to the film industry, Bánky received a motion picture star on the Hollywood Walk of Fame in 1960. Her star is located at 7021 Hollywood Boulevard.

== In popular culture ==
- Bánky is mentioned by Mr. Burns in The Simpsons episode "Homer Defined".
- William Holden's character Joe Gillis references Bánky in the film Sunset Boulevard.
- Bánky is referenced in an episode "Lucy Does the Tango" on I Love Lucy.

== Filmography ==
Films
| Year | Title | Role | Notes |
|---|---|---|---|
| 1919 | Im letzten Augenblick | | |
| 1921 | Veszélyben a pokol | Aurora | |
| 1921 | Tavaszi szerelem | Vivian | Alternative title: Spring Love; According to Hangosfilm.hu, a short fragment exists (Vándory) and in Pictures from the History of Hungarian Silent Film (1964) |
| 1921 | Galatea | Galathea | Alternative title: Vita Nova |
| 1922 | Schattenkinder des Glücks | Helen Blaas | |
| 1922 | Kauft Mariett-Aktien | | |
| 1922 | A Halott szerelme | | Alternative title: Das Auge des Toten |
| 1923 | The Portrait | | Alternative title: L'image and Das Bildnis |
| 1924 | Die letzte Stunde | Mabel | Alternative title: Hotel Potemkin |
| 1924 | Das verbotene Land | | Alternative title: Das Leben des Dalai Lama |
| 1924 | Der Zirkuskönig | Ketty | Alternative title: King of the Circus |
| 1924 | The Wonderful Adventure | Bessy Ferguson | Alternative title: Das schöne Abenteuer |
| 1925 | The Dark Angel | Kitty Vane | |
| 1925 | Soll man heiraten? | | Alternative title: Intermezzo einer Ehe in sieben Tagen or Should One Marry? |
| 1925 | The Eagle | Miss Mascha Troekouroff | Credited as Vilma Banky |
| 1926 | Son of the Sheik | Yasmin, André's Daughter | Credited as Vilma Banky |
| 1926 | The Winning of Barbara Worth | Barbara Worth | |
| 1927 | The Night of Love | Princess Marie | |
| 1927 | The Magic Flame | Bianca, the Aerial Artist | Lost film, although the first five reels are rumored to exist |
| 1927 | Die Dame von Paris | | Alternative title: The Lady from Paris |
| 1928 | Two Lovers | Donna Leonora de Vargas | Incomplete film |
| 1928 | The Awakening | Marie Ducrot | Lost film |
| 1929 | This Is Heaven | Eva Petrie | |
| 1930 | A Lady to Love | Lena Shultz | |
| 1930 | Die Sehnsucht jeder Frau | Mizzi | |
| 1933 | The Rebel | Erika Riederer | |

== Bibliography ==
- Schildgen, Rachel A. More Than a Dream: Rediscovering the Life & Films of Vilma Banky; ISBN 978-0-9827709-2-4.
