= The Night of Love =

1927 film by George Fitzmaurice

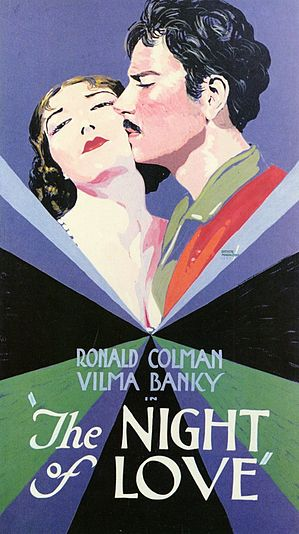
- Still with Bánky and Colman
- Directed by: George Fitzmaurice
- Written by: Lenore J. Coffee (screenplay); Edwin Justus Mayer (intertitles)
- Produced by: Samuel Goldwyn
- Starring: Ronald Colman; Vilma Bánky
- Cinematography: George Barnes /Thomas E. Brannigan
- Edited by: Grant Whytock
- Production company: Samuel Goldwyn Productions
- Distributed by: United Artists
- Release date: January 22, 1927
- Running time: 89 minutes
- Country: United States
- Language: Silent (English intertitles)

The Night of Love is a 1927 American silent romantic drama film directed by George Fitzmaurice and produced by Samuel Goldwyn. Released by United Artists, the film stars Ronald Colman, Vilma Bánky, and Montagu Love. The screenplay by Lenore J. Coffee is based on the play by Pedro Calderón de la Barca.

It tells the story of a gypsy chieftain, who in revenge for the Duke kidnapping his wife, gets revenge by stealing the duke's wife.

== Cast ==
- Ronald Colman as Montero
- Vilma Bánky as Princess Marie
- Montagu Love as Duke de la Garda
- Natalie Kingston as Donna Beatriz
- John George as Jester
- Bynunsky Hyman as Bandit
- Gibson Gowland as Bandit
- Laska Winter as Gypsy Bride
- Sally Rand as Gypsy Dancer
- William H. Tooker as Spanish Ambassador
- Eugenie Besserer as Gypsy

== Censorship ==
The film was banned in 1927 by Eric W. Hamilton, a Hong Kong censor, who stated: "The subject matter is absolutely immoral and the depiction in many cases is indecent."

Before the film could be exhibited in Kansas, the Kansas Board of Review required the film be cut extensively to remove sensual material.
