= The Winning of Barbara Worth =

1926 American silent Western film by Henry King

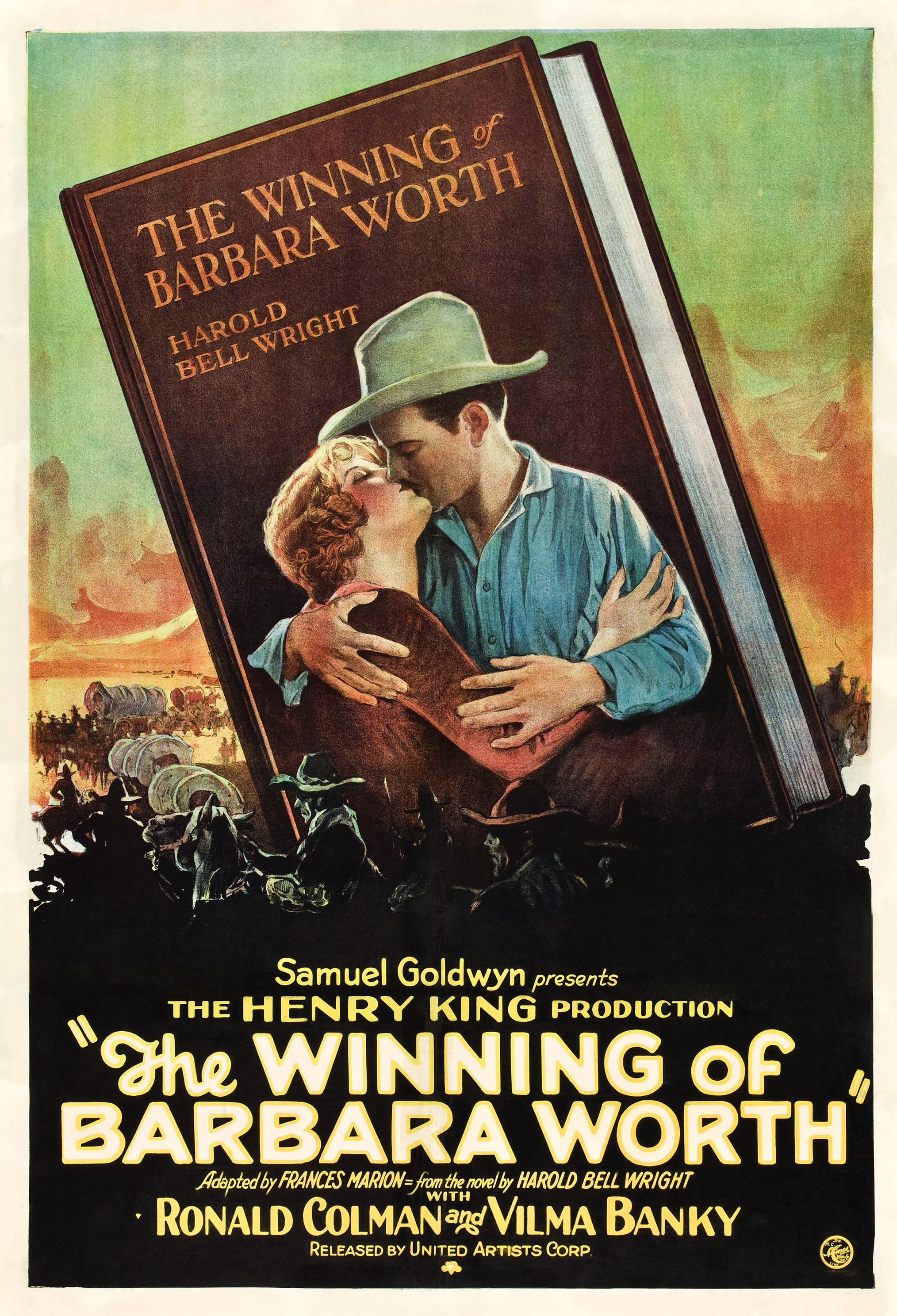
- Theatrical release poster
- Directed by: Henry King
- Written by: Frances Marion
- Based on: The Winning of Barbara Worth by Harold Bell Wright
- Produced by: Samuel Goldwyn
- Starring: Ronald Colman; Vilma Bánky; Gary Cooper
- Cinematography: George Barnes; Thomas Branigan Gregg Toland
- Edited by: Viola Lawrence
- Music by: Ted Henkel
- Production company: The Samuel Goldwyn Company
- Distributed by: United Artists
- Release date: October 14, 1926 (USA)
- Running time: 89 minutes; 9 reels, 8,757 ft.
- Country: United States
- Language: Silent (English intertitles)
- Budget: $1 million

The Winning of Barbara Worth is a 1926 American silent Western film directed by Henry King, and starring Ronald Colman, Vilma Bánky and Gary Cooper (who replaced Monte Blue). Based on Harold Bell Wright's novel The Winning of Barbara Worth, the film is remembered for the climactic flood sequence, depicting the 1905 formation of the Salton Sea.

The Winning of Barbara Worth (1926)

== Plot ==
As a child, Barbara is orphaned when her settler parents perish trying to cross a California desert. She is rescued and raised by Jefferson Worth, who dreams of irrigating the desert. Fifteen years later, Willard Holmes, the chief engineer of a company intent on diverting the Colorado River to do just that, arrives and is smitten with Barbara. However, he has a rival for her affections: local cowboy Abe Lee, who realizes, toward the end of the picture, that Barbara's love for him will never be anything more than the love a sister feels for a brother. Willard Holmes's greedy employer, meanwhile, refuses to spend the money to reinforce his gigantic water project. This results in a catastrophic flood, the visual and dramatic highlight of the film. Barbara is impressed by Willard's heroism, and he promises to return to marry her after he has conquered the Colorado River and turned the desert into a bountiful paradise.

== Cast ==
- Ronald Colman as Willard Holmes
- Vilma Bánky as Barbara Worth
- Gary Cooper as Abe Lee
- Charles Willis Lane as Jefferson Worth
- Paul McAllister as The Seer
- E. J. Ratcliffe as James Greenfield
- Clyde Cook as Tex
- Erwin Connelly as Pat Mooney
- Ed Brady as McDonald
- Sammy Blum as Horace Blanton
- Fred Esmelton as George Cartwright
- Bill Patton as Little Rosebud

== Production ==
The movie was filmed in California's Imperial Valley and in the Black Rock Desert of Nevada.
