= List of minor planets: 567001–568000 =

The following is a partial list of minor planets, running from minor-planet number 567001 through 568000, inclusive. The primary data for this and other partial lists is based on JPL's "Small-Body Orbital Elements" and data available from the Minor Planet Center. Critical list information is also provided by the MPC, unless otherwise specified from Lowell Observatory. A detailed description of the table's columns and additional sources are given on the main page including a complete list of every page in this series, and a statistical break-up on the dynamical classification of minor planets.

Also see the summary list of all named bodies in numerical and alphabetical order, and the corresponding naming citations for the number range of this particular list. New namings may only be added to this list after official publication, as the preannouncement of names is condemned by the Working Group for Small Bodies Nomenclature of the International Astronomical Union.

Near-Earth obj.	MBA (inner)	MBA (outer)	Centaur
Mars-crosser	MBA (middle)	Jupiter trojan	Trans-Neptunian obj.
Unclassified

== 567001–567100 ==
Designation			Discovery			Properties		Ref
Permanent	Provisional	Named after	Date	Site	Discoverer(s)	Category	Diam.	Ref
567001	2018 VL_{100}	—	September 16, 2009	Mount Lemmon	Mount Lemmon Survey	·	1.6 km	MPC · JPL
567002	2018 VZ_{100}	—	August 26, 2012	Haleakala	Pan-STARRS 1	·	2.3 km	MPC · JPL
567003	2018 VA_{101}	—	September 10, 2013	Haleakala	Pan-STARRS 1	·	1.5 km	MPC · JPL
567004	2018 VM_{101}	—	September 18, 2009	Kitt Peak	Spacewatch	·	1.3 km	MPC · JPL
567005	2018 VW_{101}	—	October 28, 2005	Mount Lemmon	Mount Lemmon Survey	·	1.5 km	MPC · JPL
567006	2018 VA_{102}	—	November 2, 2013	Mount Lemmon	Mount Lemmon Survey	·	1.5 km	MPC · JPL
567007	2018 VE_{103}	—	September 21, 2012	Mount Lemmon	Mount Lemmon Survey	·	2.5 km	MPC · JPL
567008	2018 VQ_{103}	—	September 10, 2013	Haleakala	Pan-STARRS 1	·	1.7 km	MPC · JPL
567009	2018 VR_{104}	—	September 23, 2012	Kitt Peak	Spacewatch	·	2.6 km	MPC · JPL
567010 Kanyósándor	2018 VS_{104}	Kanyósándor	March 7, 2011	Piszkéstető	K. Sárneczky, J. Kelemen	GEF	1.1 km	MPC · JPL
567011	2018 VY_{104}	—	October 25, 2009	Kitt Peak	Spacewatch	·	1.7 km	MPC · JPL
567012	2018 VE_{105}	—	September 19, 1995	Kitt Peak	Spacewatch	·	2.5 km	MPC · JPL
567013	2018 VY_{106}	—	October 5, 2004	Kitt Peak	Spacewatch	·	1.9 km	MPC · JPL
567014	2018 VV_{107}	—	December 29, 2014	Haleakala	Pan-STARRS 1	·	1.2 km	MPC · JPL
567015	2018 VX_{107}	—	November 2, 2013	Mount Lemmon	Mount Lemmon Survey	·	2.4 km	MPC · JPL
567016	2018 VD_{108}	—	November 4, 2005	Kitt Peak	Spacewatch	·	1.3 km	MPC · JPL
567017	2018 VR_{108}	—	September 28, 2003	Apache Point	SDSS Collaboration	KOR	1.0 km	MPC · JPL
567018	2018 VX_{109}	—	October 20, 2007	Mount Lemmon	Mount Lemmon Survey	·	2.8 km	MPC · JPL
567019	2018 VE_{110}	—	April 15, 2010	Kitt Peak	Spacewatch	·	2.8 km	MPC · JPL
567020	2018 VA_{111}	—	October 17, 2007	Mount Lemmon	Mount Lemmon Survey	·	2.6 km	MPC · JPL
567021	2018 VG_{111}	—	November 4, 2005	Kitt Peak	Spacewatch	·	3.0 km	MPC · JPL
567022	2018 VG_{112}	—	May 25, 2006	Mount Lemmon	Mount Lemmon Survey	·	2.2 km	MPC · JPL
567023	2018 VO_{120}	—	October 8, 2012	Haleakala	Pan-STARRS 1	·	2.4 km	MPC · JPL
567024	2018 VU_{121}	—	February 8, 2011	Mount Lemmon	Mount Lemmon Survey	·	1.0 km	MPC · JPL
567025	2018 VV_{121}	—	March 17, 2016	Haleakala	Pan-STARRS 1	·	2.2 km	MPC · JPL
567026	2018 VA_{122}	—	October 10, 2018	Mount Lemmon	Mount Lemmon Survey	EOS	1.5 km	MPC · JPL
567027	2018 VE_{122}	—	October 18, 2012	Haleakala	Pan-STARRS 1	VER	2.1 km	MPC · JPL
567028	2018 VM_{123}	—	November 9, 2018	Haleakala	Pan-STARRS 2	·	3.0 km	MPC · JPL
567029	2018 VD_{126}	—	November 1, 2018	Mount Lemmon	Mount Lemmon Survey	·	2.3 km	MPC · JPL
567030	2018 VM_{128}	—	November 6, 2018	Haleakala	Pan-STARRS 2	·	2.6 km	MPC · JPL
567031	2018 WV_{3}	—	October 11, 2007	Catalina	CSS	·	3.0 km	MPC · JPL
567032	2018 XO_{1}	—	June 25, 2015	Haleakala	Pan-STARRS 1	H	410 m	MPC · JPL
567033	2018 XE_{7}	—	October 12, 2007	Mount Lemmon	Mount Lemmon Survey	·	2.5 km	MPC · JPL
567034	2018 XF_{7}	—	October 8, 2007	Mount Lemmon	Mount Lemmon Survey	·	2.0 km	MPC · JPL
567035	2018 XK_{7}	—	April 10, 2010	Mount Lemmon	Mount Lemmon Survey	·	3.0 km	MPC · JPL
567036	2018 XF_{8}	—	December 27, 2005	Kitt Peak	Spacewatch	·	1.9 km	MPC · JPL
567037	2018 XV_{8}	—	January 2, 2014	Mount Lemmon	Mount Lemmon Survey	·	1.9 km	MPC · JPL
567038	2018 XC_{9}	—	November 13, 2010	Kitt Peak	Spacewatch	·	1.3 km	MPC · JPL
567039	2018 XX_{9}	—	April 30, 2016	Haleakala	Pan-STARRS 1	·	1.7 km	MPC · JPL
567040	2018 XJ_{10}	—	January 23, 2015	Haleakala	Pan-STARRS 1	·	1.9 km	MPC · JPL
567041	2018 XW_{15}	—	May 3, 2016	Mount Lemmon	Mount Lemmon Survey	EOS	2.1 km	MPC · JPL
567042	2018 XB_{16}	—	November 26, 2000	Kitt Peak	Spacewatch	·	2.3 km	MPC · JPL
567043	2018 XL_{17}	—	November 17, 2001	Anderson Mesa	LONEOS	TIR	3.8 km	MPC · JPL
567044	2018 XM_{19}	—	August 28, 2005	Siding Spring	SSS	·	4.0 km	MPC · JPL
567045	2018 XH_{20}	—	May 24, 2011	Mount Lemmon	Mount Lemmon Survey	EOS	2.0 km	MPC · JPL
567046	2018 YP_{3}	—	January 9, 2002	Socorro	LINEAR	HNS	1.4 km	MPC · JPL
567047	2019 AJ_{15}	—	May 16, 2005	Kitt Peak	Spacewatch	·	1.2 km	MPC · JPL
567048	2019 AF_{18}	—	October 20, 2007	Catalina	CSS	TIR	2.5 km	MPC · JPL
567049	2019 AE_{19}	—	June 3, 2011	Kitt Peak	Spacewatch	·	3.3 km	MPC · JPL
567050	2019 AS_{20}	—	February 28, 2009	Kitt Peak	Spacewatch	·	2.5 km	MPC · JPL
567051	2019 AM_{21}	—	July 16, 2013	Haleakala	Pan-STARRS 1	·	1.5 km	MPC · JPL
567052	2019 AN_{21}	—	February 8, 2008	Kitt Peak	Spacewatch	·	3.4 km	MPC · JPL
567053	2019 AJ_{22}	—	October 18, 2012	Haleakala	Pan-STARRS 1	·	2.6 km	MPC · JPL
567054	2019 AN_{22}	—	August 5, 2005	Palomar	NEAT	EUN	1.4 km	MPC · JPL
567055	2019 AV_{24}	—	December 3, 2013	Oukaïmeden	M. Ory	·	2.9 km	MPC · JPL
567056	2019 AZ_{24}	—	September 16, 2009	Catalina	CSS	·	1.6 km	MPC · JPL
567057	2019 AL_{25}	—	March 11, 2005	Mount Lemmon	Mount Lemmon Survey	·	2.2 km	MPC · JPL
567058	2019 AM_{25}	—	January 18, 2012	Oukaïmeden	M. Ory	T_{j} (2.98) · 3:2	6.3 km	MPC · JPL
567059	2019 AX_{25}	—	February 6, 2014	Mount Lemmon	Mount Lemmon Survey	EOS	1.6 km	MPC · JPL
567060	2019 AT_{29}	—	October 9, 2006	Palomar	NEAT	·	2.8 km	MPC · JPL
567061	2019 AH_{33}	—	September 27, 2006	Mount Lemmon	Mount Lemmon Survey	·	3.0 km	MPC · JPL
567062	2019 AH_{40}	—	November 25, 2006	Kitt Peak	Spacewatch	·	2.6 km	MPC · JPL
567063	2019 AR_{43}	—	January 15, 2005	Socorro	LINEAR	·	2.1 km	MPC · JPL
567064	2019 BZ_{7}	—	October 14, 2001	Kitt Peak	Spacewatch	EOS	1.9 km	MPC · JPL
567065	2019 CY_{4}	—	February 8, 2019	Haleakala	Pan-STARRS 1	centaur	40 km	MPC · JPL
567066	2019 DG	—	November 2, 2015	Haleakala	Pan-STARRS 1	L5	8.4 km	MPC · JPL
567067	2019 GA_{2}	—	October 26, 2014	Haleakala	Pan-STARRS 1	L5	10 km	MPC · JPL
567068	2019 GX_{12}	—	October 3, 2013	Haleakala	Pan-STARRS 1	L5	7.0 km	MPC · JPL
567069	2019 GF_{13}	—	September 5, 2013	Kitt Peak	Spacewatch	L5	7.6 km	MPC · JPL
567070	2019 GB_{19}	—	April 7, 2019	Haleakala	Pan-STARRS 1	centaur	50 km	MPC · JPL
567071	2019 GJ_{48}	—	May 2, 2009	Mount Lemmon	Mount Lemmon Survey	L5	8.8 km	MPC · JPL
567072	2019 HG_{2}	—	May 3, 2014	Haleakala	Pan-STARRS 1	H	490 m	MPC · JPL
567073	2019 KX_{4}	—	October 23, 2009	Mount Lemmon	Mount Lemmon Survey	L4	10 km	MPC · JPL
567074	2019 KH_{5}	—	January 23, 2006	Kitt Peak	Spacewatch	L5	10 km	MPC · JPL
567075	2019 LD	—	April 22, 2010	WISE	WISE	L5	7.5 km	MPC · JPL
567076	2019 LE	—	January 25, 2006	Kitt Peak	Spacewatch	L5	7.6 km	MPC · JPL
567077	2019 LW_{1}	—	June 3, 2019	Haleakala	Pan-STARRS 1	AMO	510 m	MPC · JPL
567078	2019 LV_{2}	—	April 15, 2008	Mount Lemmon	Mount Lemmon Survey	L5	7.9 km	MPC · JPL
567079	2019 MF	—	February 14, 2016	Haleakala	Pan-STARRS 1	H	390 m	MPC · JPL
567080	2019 NW	—	August 4, 2011	Haleakala	Pan-STARRS 1	L5	9.1 km	MPC · JPL
567081	2019 NH_{13}	—	October 29, 2017	Haleakala	Pan-STARRS 1	H	520 m	MPC · JPL
567082	2019 OZ_{8}	—	July 25, 2006	Mount Lemmon	Mount Lemmon Survey	·	1.7 km	MPC · JPL
567083	2019 PH_{15}	—	August 1, 2011	Haleakala	Pan-STARRS 1	H	410 m	MPC · JPL
567084	2019 PO_{17}	—	July 9, 2013	Haleakala	Pan-STARRS 1	·	3.5 km	MPC · JPL
567085	2019 PT_{20}	—	November 23, 2012	Kitt Peak	Spacewatch	H	410 m	MPC · JPL
567086	2019 PE_{33}	—	August 12, 2019	Haleakala	Pan-STARRS 1	·	1.5 km	MPC · JPL
567087	2019 QR_{7}	—	September 27, 2011	Mount Lemmon	Mount Lemmon Survey	H	360 m	MPC · JPL
567088	2019 RE_{8}	—	January 8, 2016	Haleakala	Pan-STARRS 1	TIR	2.7 km	MPC · JPL
567089	2019 RV_{24}	—	September 26, 2006	Kitt Peak	Spacewatch	·	1.7 km	MPC · JPL
567090	2019 RX_{59}	—	September 5, 2019	Mount Lemmon	Mount Lemmon Survey	·	900 m	MPC · JPL
567091	2019 SA	—	February 20, 2014	Mount Lemmon	Mount Lemmon Survey	·	880 m	MPC · JPL
567092	2019 SJ_{10}	—	September 19, 2019	Haleakala	Pan-STARRS 1	AMO +1km	1.1 km	MPC · JPL
567093	2019 SR_{48}	—	November 17, 2009	Mount Lemmon	Mount Lemmon Survey	·	670 m	MPC · JPL
567094	2019 SP_{68}	—	October 21, 2007	Catalina	CSS	·	970 m	MPC · JPL
567095	2019 TJ_{3}	—	February 15, 2010	Catalina	CSS	H	520 m	MPC · JPL
567096	2019 TE_{5}	—	December 1, 2014	Haleakala	Pan-STARRS 1	H	500 m	MPC · JPL
567097	2019 TY_{8}	—	December 29, 2011	Kitt Peak	Spacewatch	·	1.2 km	MPC · JPL
567098	2019 TA_{9}	—	September 29, 2005	Kitt Peak	Spacewatch	·	1.4 km	MPC · JPL
567099	2019 TL_{9}	—	September 23, 2015	Haleakala	Pan-STARRS 1	·	1.4 km	MPC · JPL
567100	2019 TO_{9}	—	September 23, 2008	Kitt Peak	Spacewatch	·	850 m	MPC · JPL

== 567101–567200 ==
back to top

Designation			Discovery			Properties		Ref
Permanent	Provisional	Named after	Date	Site	Discoverer(s)	Category	Diam.	Ref
567101	2019 TD_{15}	—	September 21, 2001	Kitt Peak	Spacewatch	·	1.4 km	MPC · JPL
567102	2019 TM_{19}	—	March 6, 2013	Haleakala	Pan-STARRS 1	·	1.3 km	MPC · JPL
567103	2019 TV_{22}	—	October 19, 2006	Kitt Peak	Spacewatch	·	1.2 km	MPC · JPL
567104	2019 TR_{24}	—	October 3, 2019	Mount Lemmon	Mount Lemmon Survey	·	3.0 km	MPC · JPL
567105	2019 TX_{28}	—	April 20, 2009	Kitt Peak	Spacewatch	MAR	940 m	MPC · JPL
567106	2019 TD_{34}	—	October 10, 2002	Palomar	NEAT	·	1.4 km	MPC · JPL
567107	2019 UP_{15}	—	November 12, 2007	Mount Lemmon	Mount Lemmon Survey	·	1.4 km	MPC · JPL
567108	2019 UU_{15}	—	April 11, 2013	Mount Lemmon	Mount Lemmon Survey	HNS	1.3 km	MPC · JPL
567109	2019 UV_{18}	—	March 27, 2011	Mount Lemmon	Mount Lemmon Survey	·	1.6 km	MPC · JPL
567110	2019 UG_{19}	—	March 12, 2010	Catalina	CSS	·	840 m	MPC · JPL
567111	2019 UY_{19}	—	October 11, 2010	Mount Lemmon	Mount Lemmon Survey	·	1.8 km	MPC · JPL
567112	2019 UM_{25}	—	March 12, 2016	Haleakala	Pan-STARRS 1	·	2.3 km	MPC · JPL
567113	2019 UJ_{26}	—	January 4, 2013	Kitt Peak	Spacewatch	NYS	860 m	MPC · JPL
567114	2019 VN_{1}	—	January 7, 2014	Mount Lemmon	Mount Lemmon Survey	·	3.1 km	MPC · JPL
567115	2019 VD_{4}	—	October 2, 2016	Haleakala	Pan-STARRS 1	·	1.2 km	MPC · JPL
567116	2019 VJ_{6}	—	October 17, 2010	Mount Lemmon	Mount Lemmon Survey	·	1.6 km	MPC · JPL
567117	2019 VU_{6}	—	December 2, 2008	Kitt Peak	Spacewatch	HYG	1.7 km	MPC · JPL
567118	2020 BU_{30}	—	July 29, 2008	Kitt Peak	Spacewatch	AGN	930 m	MPC · JPL
567119	2020 FE_{5}	—	October 8, 2015	Haleakala	Pan-STARRS 1	L5	7.0 km	MPC · JPL
567120	2020 HE_{37}	—	April 21, 2020	Mount Lemmon	Mount Lemmon Survey	L5	6.9 km	MPC · JPL
567121	2020 HK_{37}	—	April 28, 2020	Haleakala	Pan-STARRS 1	L5	6.2 km	MPC · JPL
567122	2020 PM_{3}	—	August 13, 2020	Haleakala	Pan-STARRS 1	centaur	80 km	MPC · JPL
567123	2020 XE_{10}	—	January 8, 2010	Kitt Peak	Spacewatch	·	990 m	MPC · JPL
567124	2020 YY_{11}	—	February 25, 2007	Kitt Peak	Spacewatch	·	1.2 km	MPC · JPL
567125	2020 YB_{12}	—	January 2, 2016	Haleakala	Pan-STARRS 1	·	1.5 km	MPC · JPL
567126	2021 AC_{9}	—	December 5, 2007	Kitt Peak	Spacewatch	·	1.4 km	MPC · JPL
567127	2021 AE_{11}	—	March 11, 2003	Kitt Peak	Spacewatch	DOR	1.7 km	MPC · JPL
567128	2021 BB_{9}	—	April 26, 2007	Mount Lemmon	Mount Lemmon Survey	·	1.1 km	MPC · JPL
567129	2021 CD_{4}	—	February 7, 2021	Mount Lemmon	Mount Lemmon Survey	T_{j} (2.8) · centaur	10 km	MPC · JPL
567130	2021 CG_{12}	—	March 10, 1999	Kitt Peak	Spacewatch	THM	1.8 km	MPC · JPL
567131	2021 CQ_{13}	—	September 28, 2003	Kitt Peak	Spacewatch	·	470 m	MPC · JPL
567132	2021 CA_{15}	—	June 26, 2015	Haleakala	Pan-STARRS 1	·	550 m	MPC · JPL
567133	2000 AQ_{258}	—	January 23, 2006	Kitt Peak	Spacewatch	·	2.9 km	MPC · JPL
567134	2000 AE_{259}	—	December 30, 2013	Mount Lemmon	Mount Lemmon Survey	·	1.5 km	MPC · JPL
567135	2000 BK_{2}	—	December 12, 1999	Socorro	LINEAR	T_{j} (2.83) · unusual	2.3 km	MPC · JPL
567136	2000 BV_{52}	—	January 18, 2009	Kitt Peak	Spacewatch	·	1.7 km	MPC · JPL
567137	2000 BB_{53}	—	January 30, 2000	Kitt Peak	Spacewatch	·	610 m	MPC · JPL
567138	2000 BG_{53}	—	October 24, 2013	Mount Lemmon	Mount Lemmon Survey	·	1.5 km	MPC · JPL
567139	2000 CB_{119}	—	February 14, 2000	Kitt Peak	Spacewatch	·	3.4 km	MPC · JPL
567140	2000 CA_{128}	—	February 2, 2000	Kitt Peak	Spacewatch	·	1.2 km	MPC · JPL
567141	2000 CJ_{135}	—	February 4, 2000	Kitt Peak	Spacewatch	·	660 m	MPC · JPL
567142	2000 CM_{140}	—	February 5, 2000	Kitt Peak	Spacewatch	·	540 m	MPC · JPL
567143	2000 CA_{152}	—	October 7, 2016	Mount Lemmon	Mount Lemmon Survey	WIT	820 m	MPC · JPL
567144	2000 CF_{152}	—	March 7, 2017	Haleakala	Pan-STARRS 1	·	660 m	MPC · JPL
567145	2000 CR_{152}	—	January 14, 2012	Mount Lemmon	Mount Lemmon Survey	MAR	1.0 km	MPC · JPL
567146	2000 CJ_{153}	—	January 10, 2007	Mount Lemmon	Mount Lemmon Survey	·	960 m	MPC · JPL
567147	2000 CQ_{153}	—	November 28, 2013	Mount Lemmon	Mount Lemmon Survey	·	2.0 km	MPC · JPL
567148	2000 CN_{156}	—	August 20, 2011	Haleakala	Pan-STARRS 1	·	610 m	MPC · JPL
567149	2000 CZ_{156}	—	February 12, 2000	Apache Point	SDSS Collaboration	NYS	690 m	MPC · JPL
567150	2000 EU_{51}	—	March 3, 2000	Kitt Peak	Spacewatch	KOR	1.3 km	MPC · JPL
567151	2000 EO_{176}	—	March 3, 2000	Kitt Peak	Spacewatch	KOR	1.3 km	MPC · JPL
567152	2000 EB_{192}	—	March 3, 2000	Socorro	LINEAR	·	690 m	MPC · JPL
567153	2000 EZ_{208}	—	September 22, 2012	Kitt Peak	Spacewatch	615	1.2 km	MPC · JPL
567154	2000 EC_{209}	—	September 12, 2007	Mount Lemmon	Mount Lemmon Survey	KOR	1.2 km	MPC · JPL
567155	2000 EF_{209}	—	September 23, 2008	Mount Lemmon	Mount Lemmon Survey	·	590 m	MPC · JPL
567156	2000 EK_{209}	—	April 5, 2014	Haleakala	Pan-STARRS 1	·	610 m	MPC · JPL
567157	2000 EO_{209}	—	July 25, 2011	Haleakala	Pan-STARRS 1	·	700 m	MPC · JPL
567158	2000 EU_{209}	—	December 3, 2015	Haleakala	Pan-STARRS 1	·	2.4 km	MPC · JPL
567159	2000 EH_{212}	—	March 12, 2000	Kitt Peak	Spacewatch	·	1.5 km	MPC · JPL
567160	2000 FD_{71}	—	March 29, 2000	Kitt Peak	Spacewatch	·	1.1 km	MPC · JPL
567161	2000 FK_{74}	—	February 26, 2004	Kitt Peak	Deep Ecliptic Survey	·	960 m	MPC · JPL
567162	2000 GM_{39}	—	April 2, 2000	Anderson Mesa	LONEOS	·	610 m	MPC · JPL
567163	2000 HB_{106}	—	October 18, 2009	Mount Lemmon	Mount Lemmon Survey	H	430 m	MPC · JPL
567164	2000 JY_{94}	—	December 18, 2015	Mount Lemmon	Mount Lemmon Survey	(2076)	720 m	MPC · JPL
567165	2000 JD_{95}	—	March 11, 2016	Mount Lemmon	Mount Lemmon Survey	·	780 m	MPC · JPL
567166	2000 JH_{95}	—	September 29, 2009	Mount Lemmon	Mount Lemmon Survey	H	480 m	MPC · JPL
567167	2000 JD_{97}	—	May 2, 2000	Kitt Peak	Spacewatch	·	910 m	MPC · JPL
567168	2000 JG_{97}	—	February 3, 2017	Haleakala	Pan-STARRS 1	·	730 m	MPC · JPL
567169	2000 KA_{13}	—	May 28, 2000	Socorro	LINEAR	·	900 m	MPC · JPL
567170	2000 KA_{25}	—	May 28, 2000	Socorro	LINEAR	·	1.4 km	MPC · JPL
567171	2000 LD_{7}	—	June 5, 2000	Kitt Peak	Spacewatch	·	520 m	MPC · JPL
567172	2000 OB_{63}	—	July 30, 2000	Cerro Tololo	Deep Ecliptic Survey	·	2.3 km	MPC · JPL
567173	2000 OO_{70}	—	December 31, 2007	Mount Lemmon	Mount Lemmon Survey	·	1.9 km	MPC · JPL
567174	2000 OP_{70}	—	October 15, 2006	Kitt Peak	Spacewatch	·	1.7 km	MPC · JPL
567175	2000 OR_{70}	—	July 29, 2000	Cerro Tololo	Deep Ecliptic Survey	(5)	870 m	MPC · JPL
567176	2000 OU_{70}	—	March 27, 2012	Mount Lemmon	Mount Lemmon Survey	·	1 km	MPC · JPL
567177	2000 OC_{72}	—	June 20, 2015	Haleakala	Pan-STARRS 1	·	1.9 km	MPC · JPL
567178	2000 PX_{32}	—	May 21, 2015	Haleakala	Pan-STARRS 1	EOS	1.5 km	MPC · JPL
567179	2000 PG_{33}	—	January 31, 2006	Kitt Peak	Spacewatch	·	640 m	MPC · JPL
567180	2000 PS_{33}	—	August 30, 2011	Haleakala	Pan-STARRS 1	·	2.2 km	MPC · JPL
567181	2000 PD_{34}	—	August 3, 2000	Kitt Peak	Spacewatch	·	1.7 km	MPC · JPL
567182	2000 QR_{252}	—	August 29, 2000	La Silla	Barbieri, C.	JUN	850 m	MPC · JPL
567183	2000 QE_{255}	—	March 2, 2009	Mount Lemmon	Mount Lemmon Survey	·	2.3 km	MPC · JPL
567184	2000 QK_{255}	—	October 16, 2011	Kitt Peak	Spacewatch	·	2.5 km	MPC · JPL
567185	2000 QL_{255}	—	September 10, 2013	Haleakala	Pan-STARRS 1	(5)	1.1 km	MPC · JPL
567186	2000 QQ_{255}	—	August 25, 2000	Cerro Tololo	Deep Ecliptic Survey	·	1.2 km	MPC · JPL
567187	2000 QE_{256}	—	September 26, 2011	Haleakala	Pan-STARRS 1	·	1.9 km	MPC · JPL
567188	2000 QY_{257}	—	March 21, 2015	Haleakala	Pan-STARRS 1	·	2.5 km	MPC · JPL
567189	2000 QK_{258}	—	September 25, 2009	Kitt Peak	Spacewatch	·	1.3 km	MPC · JPL
567190	2000 QB_{260}	—	October 6, 2011	Mount Lemmon	Mount Lemmon Survey	EOS	1.6 km	MPC · JPL
567191	2000 QM_{260}	—	September 25, 2011	Haleakala	Pan-STARRS 1	·	2.4 km	MPC · JPL
567192	2000 RA_{13}	—	September 1, 2000	Socorro	LINEAR	·	1.6 km	MPC · JPL
567193	2000 RK_{108}	—	September 4, 2000	Kitt Peak	Spacewatch	(5)	1.1 km	MPC · JPL
567194	2000 RS_{108}	—	November 3, 2007	Mount Lemmon	Mount Lemmon Survey	·	610 m	MPC · JPL
567195	2000 RA_{109}	—	September 24, 2011	Haleakala	Pan-STARRS 1	EOS	1.7 km	MPC · JPL
567196	2000 RU_{109}	—	October 27, 2013	Kitt Peak	Spacewatch	(5)	970 m	MPC · JPL
567197	2000 RB_{111}	—	October 3, 2013	Haleakala	Pan-STARRS 1	(5)	980 m	MPC · JPL
567198	2000 RZ_{111}	—	October 23, 2006	Kitt Peak	Spacewatch	·	1.8 km	MPC · JPL
567199	2000 RW_{112}	—	September 8, 2000	Kitt Peak	Spacewatch	·	2.4 km	MPC · JPL
567200	2000 RE_{113}	—	September 8, 2000	Kitt Peak	Spacewatch	·	640 m	MPC · JPL

== 567201–567300 ==
back to top

Designation			Discovery			Properties		Ref
Permanent	Provisional	Named after	Date	Site	Discoverer(s)	Category	Diam.	Ref
567201	2000 SN	—	September 19, 2000	Kitt Peak	Spacewatch	·	900 m	MPC · JPL
567202	2000 SU_{5}	—	September 21, 2000	Haleakala	NEAT	·	1.8 km	MPC · JPL
567203	2000 SC_{79}	—	September 24, 2000	Socorro	LINEAR	·	2.0 km	MPC · JPL
567204	2000 SC_{90}	—	August 5, 2000	Haleakala	NEAT	·	1.4 km	MPC · JPL
567205	2000 SU_{284}	—	September 23, 2000	Socorro	LINEAR	·	2.2 km	MPC · JPL
567206	2000 SF_{329}	—	September 27, 2000	Kitt Peak	Spacewatch	·	970 m	MPC · JPL
567207	2000 SW_{342}	—	September 24, 2000	Kitt Peak	Spacewatch	·	2.2 km	MPC · JPL
567208	2000 SN_{343}	—	September 23, 2000	Socorro	LINEAR	·	2.5 km	MPC · JPL
567209	2000 SJ_{345}	—	September 23, 2000	Socorro	LINEAR	·	1.7 km	MPC · JPL
567210	2000 ST_{345}	—	September 25, 2000	Kitt Peak	Spacewatch	EOS	1.5 km	MPC · JPL
567211	2000 SF_{377}	—	September 24, 2000	Anderson Mesa	LONEOS	·	830 m	MPC · JPL
567212	2000 SK_{377}	—	September 29, 2000	Kitt Peak	Spacewatch	·	2.5 km	MPC · JPL
567213	2000 SL_{377}	—	March 14, 2012	Kitt Peak	Spacewatch	·	1.4 km	MPC · JPL
567214	2000 SR_{377}	—	October 19, 2011	Haleakala	Pan-STARRS 1	·	3.1 km	MPC · JPL
567215	2000 SW_{377}	—	April 8, 2006	Kitt Peak	Spacewatch	·	570 m	MPC · JPL
567216	2000 SZ_{377}	—	November 11, 2013	Kitt Peak	Spacewatch	·	1.3 km	MPC · JPL
567217	2000 SH_{378}	—	April 19, 2009	Mount Lemmon	Mount Lemmon Survey	·	1.9 km	MPC · JPL
567218	2000 SS_{378}	—	July 28, 2011	Haleakala	Pan-STARRS 1	L5	7.0 km	MPC · JPL
567219	2000 SU_{378}	—	May 1, 2006	Kitt Peak	Spacewatch	·	480 m	MPC · JPL
567220	2000 SA_{379}	—	September 17, 2011	Haleakala	Pan-STARRS 1	·	2.0 km	MPC · JPL
567221	2000 SD_{379}	—	December 11, 2010	Kitt Peak	Spacewatch	3:2 · (6124)	4.7 km	MPC · JPL
567222	2000 SF_{379}	—	November 6, 2013	Catalina	CSS	EUN	1.0 km	MPC · JPL
567223	2000 SJ_{379}	—	November 1, 2006	Mount Lemmon	Mount Lemmon Survey	·	2.4 km	MPC · JPL
567224	2000 SV_{379}	—	March 17, 2010	Kitt Peak	Spacewatch	NYS	840 m	MPC · JPL
567225	2000 SD_{380}	—	September 23, 2011	Kitt Peak	Spacewatch	·	3.1 km	MPC · JPL
567226	2000 SK_{380}	—	March 12, 2014	Mount Lemmon	Mount Lemmon Survey	·	2.5 km	MPC · JPL
567227	2000 SW_{380}	—	November 1, 2013	Haleakala	Pan-STARRS 1	·	1.3 km	MPC · JPL
567228	2000 SZ_{381}	—	May 21, 2012	Haleakala	Pan-STARRS 1	(5)	1.2 km	MPC · JPL
567229	2000 SE_{382}	—	September 15, 2006	Kitt Peak	Spacewatch	·	2.4 km	MPC · JPL
567230	2000 SG_{382}	—	March 14, 2011	Mount Lemmon	Mount Lemmon Survey	·	1.4 km	MPC · JPL
567231	2000 SJ_{382}	—	August 15, 2017	Haleakala	Pan-STARRS 1	ELF	3.6 km	MPC · JPL
567232	2000 SP_{382}	—	January 26, 2006	Mount Lemmon	Mount Lemmon Survey	·	1.2 km	MPC · JPL
567233	2000 SW_{382}	—	June 8, 2012	Mount Lemmon	Mount Lemmon Survey	·	1.3 km	MPC · JPL
567234	2000 SH_{383}	—	September 26, 2000	Apache Point	SDSS Collaboration	URS	2.6 km	MPC · JPL
567235	2000 SK_{383}	—	September 21, 2000	Kitt Peak	Spacewatch	·	740 m	MPC · JPL
567236	2000 SB_{384}	—	December 18, 2007	Mount Lemmon	Mount Lemmon Survey	EOS	1.7 km	MPC · JPL
567237	2000 SK_{384}	—	November 16, 2009	Mount Lemmon	Mount Lemmon Survey	·	1.4 km	MPC · JPL
567238	2000 SQ_{385}	—	September 12, 2016	Mount Lemmon	Mount Lemmon Survey	EOS	2.0 km	MPC · JPL
567239	2000 SC_{386}	—	May 27, 2012	Mount Lemmon	Mount Lemmon Survey	·	1.0 km	MPC · JPL
567240	2000 TZ_{4}	—	September 24, 2000	Kitt Peak	Spacewatch	THM	2.6 km	MPC · JPL
567241	2000 TF_{30}	—	October 2, 2000	Kitt Peak	Spacewatch	EUN	1.2 km	MPC · JPL
567242	2000 TB_{32}	—	October 4, 2000	Kitt Peak	Spacewatch	·	1.7 km	MPC · JPL
567243	2000 TC_{32}	—	October 4, 2000	Kitt Peak	Spacewatch	EOS	1.8 km	MPC · JPL
567244	2000 TA_{37}	—	October 1, 2000	Socorro	LINEAR	·	2.3 km	MPC · JPL
567245	2000 TK_{63}	—	October 3, 2000	Socorro	LINEAR	·	1.5 km	MPC · JPL
567246	2000 TM_{69}	—	September 30, 2000	Kitt Peak	Spacewatch	·	1.0 km	MPC · JPL
567247	2000 TT_{74}	—	March 15, 2007	Kitt Peak	Spacewatch	L5	7.9 km	MPC · JPL
567248	2000 TH_{75}	—	August 29, 2005	Kitt Peak	Spacewatch	·	3.0 km	MPC · JPL
567249	2000 TO_{75}	—	February 11, 2008	Mount Lemmon	Mount Lemmon Survey	·	2.6 km	MPC · JPL
567250	2000 TT_{75}	—	October 19, 2012	Mount Lemmon	Mount Lemmon Survey	·	3.9 km	MPC · JPL
567251	2000 TB_{76}	—	May 14, 2008	Mount Lemmon	Mount Lemmon Survey	·	1.1 km	MPC · JPL
567252	2000 TJ_{76}	—	February 26, 2014	Haleakala	Pan-STARRS 1	·	2.6 km	MPC · JPL
567253	2000 TL_{76}	—	January 12, 2008	Mount Lemmon	Mount Lemmon Survey	·	2.2 km	MPC · JPL
567254	2000 TM_{76}	—	October 23, 2006	Mount Lemmon	Mount Lemmon Survey	·	3.0 km	MPC · JPL
567255	2000 TR_{76}	—	May 7, 2010	Mount Lemmon	Mount Lemmon Survey	·	680 m	MPC · JPL
567256	2000 TS_{76}	—	September 23, 2011	Haleakala	Pan-STARRS 1	·	2.3 km	MPC · JPL
567257	2000 TX_{76}	—	November 19, 2009	Kitt Peak	Spacewatch	·	1.1 km	MPC · JPL
567258	2000 TF_{77}	—	May 1, 2012	Mount Lemmon	Mount Lemmon Survey	·	1.1 km	MPC · JPL
567259	2000 TG_{77}	—	August 26, 2016	Haleakala	Pan-STARRS 1	EOS	1.6 km	MPC · JPL
567260	2000 TP_{77}	—	October 2, 2013	Mount Lemmon	Mount Lemmon Survey	·	1.2 km	MPC · JPL
567261	2000 TA_{78}	—	September 24, 2011	Haleakala	Pan-STARRS 1	·	2.2 km	MPC · JPL
567262	2000 TF_{78}	—	May 13, 2016	Haleakala	Pan-STARRS 1	·	1.1 km	MPC · JPL
567263	2000 TX_{78}	—	August 6, 2005	Palomar	NEAT	·	3.0 km	MPC · JPL
567264	2000 TJ_{79}	—	September 16, 2009	Kitt Peak	Spacewatch	·	1.5 km	MPC · JPL
567265	2000 TK_{79}	—	August 10, 2007	Kitt Peak	Spacewatch	·	670 m	MPC · JPL
567266	2000 TS_{80}	—	February 26, 2014	Mount Lemmon	Mount Lemmon Survey	·	3.0 km	MPC · JPL
567267	2000 TT_{80}	—	February 10, 2008	Kitt Peak	Spacewatch	HYG	2.5 km	MPC · JPL
567268	2000 TT_{81}	—	November 25, 2005	Kitt Peak	Spacewatch	·	1.1 km	MPC · JPL
567269	2000 UK_{13}	—	October 22, 2000	Ondřejov	P. Kušnirák	·	2.4 km	MPC · JPL
567270	2000 UP_{19}	—	October 25, 2000	Socorro	LINEAR	·	1.4 km	MPC · JPL
567271	2000 UX_{30}	—	October 29, 2000	Kitt Peak	Spacewatch	·	1.5 km	MPC · JPL
567272	2000 UE_{32}	—	October 29, 2000	Kitt Peak	Spacewatch	·	2.3 km	MPC · JPL
567273	2000 UG_{115}	—	October 29, 2000	Kitt Peak	Spacewatch	·	2.3 km	MPC · JPL
567274	2000 VM_{66}	—	September 16, 2009	Kitt Peak	Spacewatch	·	1.5 km	MPC · JPL
567275	2000 WG_{64}	—	November 25, 2000	Kitt Peak	Spacewatch	·	1.3 km	MPC · JPL
567276	2000 WN_{68}	—	November 28, 2000	Junk Bond	D. Healy	·	1.7 km	MPC · JPL
567277	2000 WT_{104}	—	November 24, 2000	Kitt Peak	Spacewatch	V	830 m	MPC · JPL
567278	2000 WA_{127}	—	November 17, 2000	Kitt Peak	Spacewatch	·	1.4 km	MPC · JPL
567279	2000 WN_{131}	—	November 2, 2000	Socorro	LINEAR	·	1.4 km	MPC · JPL
567280	2000 WL_{191}	—	November 20, 2000	Socorro	LINEAR	·	3.1 km	MPC · JPL
567281	2000 WA_{199}	—	March 26, 2006	Kitt Peak	Spacewatch	·	1.1 km	MPC · JPL
567282	2000 WD_{199}	—	March 4, 2016	Haleakala	Pan-STARRS 1	·	1.3 km	MPC · JPL
567283	2000 WU_{199}	—	June 1, 2003	Cerro Tololo	Deep Ecliptic Survey	·	1.6 km	MPC · JPL
567284	2000 WE_{200}	—	October 4, 2013	Kitt Peak	Spacewatch	·	1.7 km	MPC · JPL
567285	2000 WF_{200}	—	January 26, 2011	Mount Lemmon	Mount Lemmon Survey	·	1.6 km	MPC · JPL
567286	2000 WT_{200}	—	September 29, 2013	Kitt Peak	Spacewatch	EUN	840 m	MPC · JPL
567287	2000 WA_{201}	—	October 7, 2007	Mount Lemmon	Mount Lemmon Survey	·	800 m	MPC · JPL
567288	2000 WB_{201}	—	November 12, 2013	Kitt Peak	Spacewatch	·	1.5 km	MPC · JPL
567289	2000 WH_{201}	—	June 12, 2012	Kitt Peak	Spacewatch	SYL	4.1 km	MPC · JPL
567290	2000 WV_{201}	—	April 25, 2015	Haleakala	Pan-STARRS 1	·	2.2 km	MPC · JPL
567291	2000 WB_{202}	—	October 8, 1994	Kitt Peak	Spacewatch	·	2.0 km	MPC · JPL
567292	2000 WP_{202}	—	August 26, 2014	Haleakala	Pan-STARRS 1	·	1.1 km	MPC · JPL
567293	2000 WS_{202}	—	October 12, 2013	Kitt Peak	Spacewatch	·	1.4 km	MPC · JPL
567294	2000 WU_{202}	—	May 7, 2008	Kitt Peak	Spacewatch	·	2.8 km	MPC · JPL
567295	2000 WW_{203}	—	July 9, 2003	Kitt Peak	Spacewatch	·	2.3 km	MPC · JPL
567296	2000 WX_{203}	—	November 8, 2013	Kitt Peak	Spacewatch	·	1.4 km	MPC · JPL
567297	2000 WY_{203}	—	November 4, 2013	Haleakala	Pan-STARRS 1	·	1.3 km	MPC · JPL
567298	2000 WZ_{203}	—	January 15, 2018	Haleakala	Pan-STARRS 1	·	1.7 km	MPC · JPL
567299	2000 WB_{204}	—	December 22, 2005	Kitt Peak	Spacewatch	·	1.2 km	MPC · JPL
567300	2000 WF_{204}	—	November 15, 2017	Mount Lemmon	Mount Lemmon Survey	VER	2.5 km	MPC · JPL

== 567301–567400 ==
back to top

Designation			Discovery			Properties		Ref
Permanent	Provisional	Named after	Date	Site	Discoverer(s)	Category	Diam.	Ref
567301	2000 WP_{204}	—	January 22, 2015	Haleakala	Pan-STARRS 1	VER	2.4 km	MPC · JPL
567302	2000 XO_{14}	—	November 22, 2000	Kitt Peak	Spacewatch	·	1.0 km	MPC · JPL
567303	2000 XU_{55}	—	November 27, 2013	Haleakala	Pan-STARRS 1	·	1.4 km	MPC · JPL
567304	2000 XG_{56}	—	October 22, 2006	Mount Lemmon	Mount Lemmon Survey	·	2.6 km	MPC · JPL
567305	2000 YX_{3}	—	December 18, 2000	Kitt Peak	Spacewatch	·	2.0 km	MPC · JPL
567306	2000 YB_{4}	—	December 20, 2000	Kitt Peak	Spacewatch	H	420 m	MPC · JPL
567307	2000 YQ_{16}	—	December 19, 2000	Socorro	LINEAR	H	690 m	MPC · JPL
567308	2000 YH_{75}	—	December 30, 2000	Socorro	LINEAR	T_{j} (2.93)	3.1 km	MPC · JPL
567309	2000 YC_{144}	—	October 7, 2008	Mount Lemmon	Mount Lemmon Survey	·	1.8 km	MPC · JPL
567310	2000 YG_{144}	—	November 15, 2011	Kitt Peak	Spacewatch	·	2.4 km	MPC · JPL
567311	2000 YL_{144}	—	December 21, 2006	Kitt Peak	Spacewatch	·	2.8 km	MPC · JPL
567312	2000 YS_{144}	—	August 28, 2014	Haleakala	Pan-STARRS 1	·	950 m	MPC · JPL
567313	2000 YW_{144}	—	August 30, 2016	Haleakala	Pan-STARRS 1	·	2.3 km	MPC · JPL
567314	2000 YF_{145}	—	May 7, 2013	Kitt Peak	Spacewatch	·	1.4 km	MPC · JPL
567315	2000 YG_{145}	—	December 17, 2000	Kitt Peak	Spacewatch	MAR	1.0 km	MPC · JPL
567316	2000 YZ_{145}	—	November 9, 2013	Haleakala	Pan-STARRS 1	·	1.3 km	MPC · JPL
567317	2000 YJ_{146}	—	October 6, 2008	Kitt Peak	Spacewatch	·	1.4 km	MPC · JPL
567318	2000 YK_{146}	—	February 3, 2016	Haleakala	Pan-STARRS 1	PHO	700 m	MPC · JPL
567319	2000 YL_{146}	—	October 22, 2005	Palomar	NEAT	·	2.6 km	MPC · JPL
567320	2000 YS_{146}	—	December 23, 2000	Kitt Peak	Spacewatch	·	4.2 km	MPC · JPL
567321	2001 AS_{2}	—	January 1, 2001	Kitt Peak	Spacewatch	·	2.5 km	MPC · JPL
567322	2001 BM_{5}	—	January 19, 2001	Socorro	LINEAR	PHO	900 m	MPC · JPL
567323	2001 BA_{14}	—	January 19, 2001	Kitt Peak	Spacewatch	·	2.5 km	MPC · JPL
567324	2001 BA_{82}	—	January 18, 2001	Socorro	LINEAR	·	2.2 km	MPC · JPL
567325	2001 BQ_{83}	—	November 17, 2006	Mount Lemmon	Mount Lemmon Survey	·	3.8 km	MPC · JPL
567326	2001 BY_{83}	—	July 17, 2016	Haleakala	Pan-STARRS 1	·	3.1 km	MPC · JPL
567327	2001 BP_{84}	—	October 20, 2016	Mount Lemmon	Mount Lemmon Survey	VER	2.3 km	MPC · JPL
567328	2001 BQ_{84}	—	September 21, 2003	Kitt Peak	Spacewatch	V	510 m	MPC · JPL
567329 Zinaida	2001 BY_{84}	Zinaida	September 24, 2009	Zelenchukskaya Station	T. V. Krjačko, B. Satovski	L4	8.8 km	MPC · JPL
567330	2001 BZ_{84}	—	March 4, 2012	Mount Lemmon	Mount Lemmon Survey	NYS	730 m	MPC · JPL
567331	2001 CX_{41}	—	January 26, 2001	Kitt Peak	Spacewatch	DOR	1.8 km	MPC · JPL
567332	2001 CO_{50}	—	March 4, 1994	Kitt Peak	Spacewatch	·	810 m	MPC · JPL
567333	2001 DU_{7}	—	February 2, 2001	Socorro	LINEAR	PHO	1.1 km	MPC · JPL
567334	2001 DC_{112}	—	March 31, 2001	Kitt Peak	Spacewatch	·	3.3 km	MPC · JPL
567335	2001 DE_{112}	—	March 4, 2013	Haleakala	Pan-STARRS 1	·	3.6 km	MPC · JPL
567336	2001 DH_{112}	—	September 5, 2007	Mount Lemmon	Mount Lemmon Survey	·	2.1 km	MPC · JPL
567337	2001 DR_{112}	—	January 23, 2015	Haleakala	Pan-STARRS 1	·	1.7 km	MPC · JPL
567338	2001 DS_{112}	—	November 2, 2008	Mount Lemmon	Mount Lemmon Survey	·	1.6 km	MPC · JPL
567339	2001 DD_{113}	—	February 25, 2015	Haleakala	Pan-STARRS 1	GEF	1.2 km	MPC · JPL
567340	2001 DF_{113}	—	August 29, 2006	Catalina	CSS	·	1.2 km	MPC · JPL
567341	2001 DA_{114}	—	September 27, 2003	Kitt Peak	Spacewatch	·	1.5 km	MPC · JPL
567342	2001 DH_{114}	—	August 6, 2012	Haleakala	Pan-STARRS 1	·	1.7 km	MPC · JPL
567343	2001 DM_{115}	—	February 16, 2015	Haleakala	Pan-STARRS 1	·	1.6 km	MPC · JPL
567344	2001 DR_{115}	—	September 28, 2009	Kitt Peak	Spacewatch	EOS	1.4 km	MPC · JPL
567345	2001 DA_{116}	—	September 4, 2016	Mount Lemmon	Mount Lemmon Survey	HNS	1.1 km	MPC · JPL
567346	2001 DN_{116}	—	February 16, 2015	Haleakala	Pan-STARRS 1	·	560 m	MPC · JPL
567347	2001 DY_{116}	—	October 8, 2004	Kitt Peak	Spacewatch	DOR	1.8 km	MPC · JPL
567348	2001 DM_{119}	—	November 21, 2009	Mount Lemmon	Mount Lemmon Survey	·	1.4 km	MPC · JPL
567349	2001 DW_{119}	—	November 24, 2009	Mount Lemmon	Mount Lemmon Survey	L4	7.0 km	MPC · JPL
567350	2001 FB_{183}	—	March 26, 2001	Kitt Peak	Spacewatch	·	1.3 km	MPC · JPL
567351	2001 FF_{198}	—	March 21, 2001	Kitt Peak	SKADS	·	1.1 km	MPC · JPL
567352	2001 FM_{198}	—	March 26, 2001	Kitt Peak	Deep Ecliptic Survey	KOR	970 m	MPC · JPL
567353	2001 FQ_{198}	—	March 31, 2001	Kitt Peak	Spacewatch	·	980 m	MPC · JPL
567354	2001 FZ_{199}	—	January 10, 2008	Kitt Peak	Spacewatch	MAS	570 m	MPC · JPL
567355	2001 FW_{204}	—	February 8, 2008	Kitt Peak	Spacewatch	·	630 m	MPC · JPL
567356	2001 FB_{205}	—	March 20, 2001	Kitt Peak	Spacewatch	·	510 m	MPC · JPL
567357	2001 FU_{206}	—	March 21, 2001	Kitt Peak	SKADS	KOR	990 m	MPC · JPL
567358	2001 FM_{207}	—	September 11, 2007	Mount Lemmon	Mount Lemmon Survey	·	1.7 km	MPC · JPL
567359	2001 FR_{207}	—	March 26, 2001	Kitt Peak	Deep Ecliptic Survey	·	930 m	MPC · JPL
567360	2001 FQ_{210}	—	September 24, 2008	Kitt Peak	Spacewatch	·	2.0 km	MPC · JPL
567361	2001 FP_{216}	—	March 26, 2001	Kitt Peak	Spacewatch	·	1.7 km	MPC · JPL
567362	2001 FU_{218}	—	November 2, 2008	Mount Lemmon	Mount Lemmon Survey	·	1.4 km	MPC · JPL
567363	2001 FR_{228}	—	October 5, 2004	Kitt Peak	Spacewatch	·	2.0 km	MPC · JPL
567364	2001 FG_{232}	—	March 29, 2001	Kitt Peak	SKADS	LUT	2.8 km	MPC · JPL
567365	2001 FE_{244}	—	March 24, 2001	Kitt Peak	Spacewatch	·	1.2 km	MPC · JPL
567366	2001 FF_{244}	—	December 1, 2008	Kitt Peak	Spacewatch	·	1.7 km	MPC · JPL
567367	2001 FS_{244}	—	September 28, 2003	Kitt Peak	Spacewatch	AGN	1.1 km	MPC · JPL
567368	2001 FX_{244}	—	October 29, 2008	Mount Lemmon	Mount Lemmon Survey	·	1.6 km	MPC · JPL
567369	2001 FN_{246}	—	August 8, 2015	Haleakala	Pan-STARRS 2	·	1.2 km	MPC · JPL
567370	2001 FW_{246}	—	January 7, 2017	Mount Lemmon	Mount Lemmon Survey	·	2.8 km	MPC · JPL
567371	2001 FT_{247}	—	October 7, 2007	Mount Lemmon	Mount Lemmon Survey	EUN	820 m	MPC · JPL
567372	2001 FX_{247}	—	November 13, 2010	Mount Lemmon	Mount Lemmon Survey	·	1.2 km	MPC · JPL
567373	2001 HY_{68}	—	December 30, 2013	Haleakala	Pan-STARRS 1	HOF	2.2 km	MPC · JPL
567374	2001 HG_{69}	—	April 6, 2014	Kitt Peak	Spacewatch	·	520 m	MPC · JPL
567375	2001 JG_{11}	—	October 26, 2012	Mount Lemmon	Mount Lemmon Survey	BRA	1.7 km	MPC · JPL
567376	2001 JH_{11}	—	October 11, 2012	Haleakala	Pan-STARRS 1	·	570 m	MPC · JPL
567377	2001 KT_{79}	—	December 6, 2007	Kitt Peak	Spacewatch	·	1.2 km	MPC · JPL
567378	2001 KV_{79}	—	September 28, 2008	Mount Lemmon	Mount Lemmon Survey	·	2.1 km	MPC · JPL
567379	2001 KX_{79}	—	March 24, 2015	Mount Lemmon	Mount Lemmon Survey	BRA	1.2 km	MPC · JPL
567380	2001 KF_{80}	—	December 27, 2005	Mount Lemmon	Mount Lemmon Survey	·	590 m	MPC · JPL
567381	2001 KH_{80}	—	April 15, 2010	Kitt Peak	Spacewatch	·	2.2 km	MPC · JPL
567382	2001 KX_{80}	—	January 9, 2014	Mount Lemmon	Mount Lemmon Survey	EOS	1.6 km	MPC · JPL
567383	2001 KP_{82}	—	January 20, 2012	Haleakala	Pan-STARRS 1	·	1.2 km	MPC · JPL
567384	2001 KY_{83}	—	May 23, 2001	Cerro Tololo	Deep Ecliptic Survey	·	1.6 km	MPC · JPL
567385	2001 KF_{84}	—	April 29, 2014	Haleakala	Pan-STARRS 1	·	660 m	MPC · JPL
567386	2001 KN_{84}	—	March 28, 2012	Mount Lemmon	Mount Lemmon Survey	NYS	870 m	MPC · JPL
567387	2001 KS_{86}	—	October 26, 2013	Kitt Peak	Spacewatch	·	790 m	MPC · JPL
567388	2001 KE_{87}	—	January 2, 2011	Mount Lemmon	Mount Lemmon Survey	·	2.6 km	MPC · JPL
567389	2001 KD_{88}	—	March 11, 2008	Mount Lemmon	Mount Lemmon Survey	(5)	980 m	MPC · JPL
567390	2001 KS_{88}	—	April 15, 2007	Kitt Peak	Spacewatch	·	3.5 km	MPC · JPL
567391	2001 MR_{31}	—	November 11, 2010	Mount Lemmon	Mount Lemmon Survey	TIR	2.5 km	MPC · JPL
567392	2001 NH_{4}	—	July 13, 2001	Palomar	NEAT	·	1.1 km	MPC · JPL
567393	2001 OT_{114}	—	July 19, 2001	Palomar	NEAT	·	1.2 km	MPC · JPL
567394	2001 OB_{115}	—	January 13, 2011	Kitt Peak	Spacewatch	·	880 m	MPC · JPL
567395	2001 OG_{115}	—	January 31, 2016	Haleakala	Pan-STARRS 1	HNS	1.3 km	MPC · JPL
567396	2001 PK_{38}	—	August 11, 2001	Palomar	NEAT	·	3.0 km	MPC · JPL
567397	2001 PU_{67}	—	June 26, 2011	Mount Lemmon	Mount Lemmon Survey	·	960 m	MPC · JPL
567398	2001 PX_{67}	—	January 10, 2006	Kitt Peak	Spacewatch	PHO	730 m	MPC · JPL
567399	2001 QY_{106}	—	July 30, 2001	Palomar	NEAT	H	610 m	MPC · JPL
567400	2001 QH_{302}	—	August 19, 2001	Cerro Tololo	Deep Ecliptic Survey	·	930 m	MPC · JPL

== 567401–567500 ==
back to top

Designation			Discovery			Properties		Ref
Permanent	Provisional	Named after	Date	Site	Discoverer(s)	Category	Diam.	Ref
567401	2001 QQ_{307}	—	August 19, 2001	Cerro Tololo	Deep Ecliptic Survey	·	620 m	MPC · JPL
567402	2001 QR_{310}	—	August 19, 2001	Cerro Tololo	Deep Ecliptic Survey	·	2.0 km	MPC · JPL
567403	2001 QS_{335}	—	December 13, 2006	Kitt Peak	Spacewatch	·	1.2 km	MPC · JPL
567404	2001 QH_{336}	—	February 3, 2013	Haleakala	Pan-STARRS 1	H	410 m	MPC · JPL
567405	2001 QJ_{337}	—	January 12, 2010	Kitt Peak	Spacewatch	V	490 m	MPC · JPL
567406	2001 QW_{338}	—	September 21, 2011	Mount Lemmon	Mount Lemmon Survey	KOR	1.3 km	MPC · JPL
567407	2001 QA_{339}	—	September 15, 2006	Kitt Peak	Spacewatch	·	1.5 km	MPC · JPL
567408	2001 QD_{339}	—	August 25, 2001	Palomar	NEAT	(5)	1.2 km	MPC · JPL
567409	2001 RD_{52}	—	September 12, 2001	Socorro	LINEAR	TIR	2.2 km	MPC · JPL
567410	2001 RW_{137}	—	September 12, 2001	Socorro	LINEAR	·	1.7 km	MPC · JPL
567411	2001 RH_{156}	—	September 11, 2001	Kitt Peak	Spacewatch	·	710 m	MPC · JPL
567412	2001 RH_{157}	—	September 12, 2001	Kitt Peak	Deep Ecliptic Survey	·	750 m	MPC · JPL
567413	2001 RP_{157}	—	September 20, 2001	Kitt Peak	Spacewatch	·	1.8 km	MPC · JPL
567414	2001 RR_{157}	—	January 28, 2014	Catalina	CSS	·	2.3 km	MPC · JPL
567415	2001 RT_{157}	—	May 4, 2010	Kitt Peak	Spacewatch	·	1.9 km	MPC · JPL
567416	2001 RM_{158}	—	September 12, 2001	Kitt Peak	Spacewatch	EOS	1.3 km	MPC · JPL
567417	2001 SO_{91}	—	September 20, 2001	Socorro	LINEAR	·	510 m	MPC · JPL
567418	2001 SH_{96}	—	September 20, 2001	Socorro	LINEAR	EUN	900 m	MPC · JPL
567419	2001 ST_{134}	—	September 16, 2001	Socorro	LINEAR	·	1.6 km	MPC · JPL
567420	2001 SD_{192}	—	September 12, 2001	Socorro	LINEAR	·	920 m	MPC · JPL
567421	2001 SN_{217}	—	September 19, 2001	Socorro	LINEAR	·	1.7 km	MPC · JPL
567422	2001 SJ_{237}	—	September 19, 2001	Socorro	LINEAR	·	1.0 km	MPC · JPL
567423	2001 SV_{258}	—	September 20, 2001	Socorro	LINEAR	EOS	1.6 km	MPC · JPL
567424	2001 SS_{269}	—	September 19, 2001	Kitt Peak	Spacewatch	·	1.7 km	MPC · JPL
567425	2001 SV_{304}	—	September 20, 2001	Socorro	LINEAR	(5)	810 m	MPC · JPL
567426	2001 SL_{308}	—	September 21, 2001	Socorro	LINEAR	·	1.9 km	MPC · JPL
567427	2001 SV_{316}	—	September 16, 2001	Socorro	LINEAR	·	690 m	MPC · JPL
567428	2001 SN_{321}	—	September 25, 2001	Socorro	LINEAR	·	1.8 km	MPC · JPL
567429	2001 SH_{332}	—	September 19, 2001	Kitt Peak	Spacewatch	(5)	1.0 km	MPC · JPL
567430	2001 SB_{357}	—	October 15, 2001	Palomar	NEAT	EOS	2.3 km	MPC · JPL
567431	2001 SL_{357}	—	July 5, 2016	Haleakala	Pan-STARRS 1	EOS	1.7 km	MPC · JPL
567432	2001 SM_{357}	—	August 27, 2005	Palomar	NEAT	·	960 m	MPC · JPL
567433	2001 SS_{357}	—	October 23, 2001	Palomar	NEAT	·	1.7 km	MPC · JPL
567434	2001 SV_{357}	—	October 28, 2001	Palomar	NEAT	·	1.3 km	MPC · JPL
567435	2001 SY_{357}	—	February 24, 1995	Kitt Peak	Spacewatch	·	1.2 km	MPC · JPL
567436	2001 SD_{358}	—	June 18, 2015	Haleakala	Pan-STARRS 1	·	1.8 km	MPC · JPL
567437	2001 SE_{358}	—	March 13, 2007	Mount Lemmon	Mount Lemmon Survey	·	600 m	MPC · JPL
567438	2001 SJ_{358}	—	January 17, 2013	Kitt Peak	Spacewatch	·	1.8 km	MPC · JPL
567439	2001 SK_{358}	—	September 20, 2001	Kitt Peak	Spacewatch	·	1.7 km	MPC · JPL
567440	2001 SD_{359}	—	September 18, 2001	Apache Point	SDSS Collaboration	EOS	1.4 km	MPC · JPL
567441	2001 SG_{359}	—	October 23, 2012	Kitt Peak	Spacewatch	·	1.8 km	MPC · JPL
567442	2001 SJ_{359}	—	September 19, 2001	Kitt Peak	Spacewatch	EOS	1.5 km	MPC · JPL
567443	2001 SS_{360}	—	August 5, 2005	Palomar	NEAT	·	1.4 km	MPC · JPL
567444	2001 SA_{361}	—	October 4, 2006	Mount Lemmon	Mount Lemmon Survey	·	2.3 km	MPC · JPL
567445	2001 SE_{363}	—	February 12, 2018	Haleakala	Pan-STARRS 1	·	1.5 km	MPC · JPL
567446	2001 SJ_{363}	—	July 5, 2017	Haleakala	Pan-STARRS 1	·	1.1 km	MPC · JPL
567447	2001 SX_{363}	—	October 20, 2012	Kitt Peak	Spacewatch	EOS	1.6 km	MPC · JPL
567448	2001 TC_{176}	—	October 14, 2001	Socorro	LINEAR	(116763)	1.3 km	MPC · JPL
567449	2001 TD_{176}	—	October 11, 2001	Kitt Peak	Spacewatch	·	620 m	MPC · JPL
567450	2001 TH_{203}	—	October 11, 2001	Socorro	LINEAR	·	1.5 km	MPC · JPL
567451	2001 TH_{207}	—	October 11, 2001	Palomar	NEAT	·	1.6 km	MPC · JPL
567452	2001 TK_{230}	—	October 15, 2001	Kitt Peak	Spacewatch	V	530 m	MPC · JPL
567453	2001 TA_{261}	—	March 26, 2003	Kitt Peak	Spacewatch	(5)	1.4 km	MPC · JPL
567454	2001 TZ_{261}	—	September 25, 2009	Mount Lemmon	Mount Lemmon Survey	·	990 m	MPC · JPL
567455	2001 TK_{262}	—	February 8, 2011	Mount Lemmon	Mount Lemmon Survey	·	1.1 km	MPC · JPL
567456	2001 TE_{264}	—	February 20, 2009	Kitt Peak	Spacewatch	·	1.6 km	MPC · JPL
567457	2001 TS_{264}	—	October 14, 2001	Apache Point	SDSS Collaboration	EOS	1.4 km	MPC · JPL
567458	2001 TW_{264}	—	December 23, 2012	Haleakala	Pan-STARRS 1	·	690 m	MPC · JPL
567459	2001 TJ_{265}	—	October 15, 2001	Palomar	NEAT	·	1.1 km	MPC · JPL
567460	2001 TL_{266}	—	November 24, 2008	Kitt Peak	Spacewatch	·	600 m	MPC · JPL
567461	2001 TR_{268}	—	March 16, 2007	Mount Lemmon	Mount Lemmon Survey	L5	8.1 km	MPC · JPL
567462	2001 TU_{268}	—	October 14, 2001	Kitt Peak	Spacewatch	·	2.1 km	MPC · JPL
567463	2001 TY_{268}	—	October 14, 2001	Kitt Peak	Spacewatch	·	2.4 km	MPC · JPL
567464	2001 UZ_{26}	—	October 16, 2001	Palomar	NEAT	·	2.1 km	MPC · JPL
567465	2001 UL_{59}	—	October 16, 2001	Kitt Peak	Spacewatch	·	1.8 km	MPC · JPL
567466	2001 UR_{69}	—	October 17, 2001	Kitt Peak	Spacewatch	·	2.5 km	MPC · JPL
567467	2001 UM_{88}	—	October 21, 2001	Kitt Peak	Spacewatch	·	1.8 km	MPC · JPL
567468	2001 UZ_{103}	—	October 20, 2001	Socorro	LINEAR	·	1.1 km	MPC · JPL
567469	2001 UD_{133}	—	October 21, 2001	Socorro	LINEAR	·	590 m	MPC · JPL
567470	2001 UR_{133}	—	October 21, 2001	Socorro	LINEAR	THB	2.1 km	MPC · JPL
567471	2001 UQ_{137}	—	October 18, 2001	Palomar	NEAT	·	2.3 km	MPC · JPL
567472	2001 UR_{142}	—	October 23, 2001	Socorro	LINEAR	·	660 m	MPC · JPL
567473	2001 UL_{166}	—	October 21, 2001	Kitt Peak	Spacewatch	·	1.9 km	MPC · JPL
567474	2001 UX_{166}	—	October 23, 2001	Socorro	LINEAR	·	700 m	MPC · JPL
567475	2001 UH_{191}	—	September 28, 2001	Palomar	NEAT	EOS	1.9 km	MPC · JPL
567476	2001 UQ_{191}	—	September 28, 2001	Palomar	NEAT	·	2.3 km	MPC · JPL
567477	2001 UW_{193}	—	October 18, 2001	Palomar	NEAT	·	1.6 km	MPC · JPL
567478	2001 UM_{194}	—	October 18, 2001	Palomar	NEAT	·	2.6 km	MPC · JPL
567479	2001 UU_{197}	—	October 21, 2001	Socorro	LINEAR	DOR	1.5 km	MPC · JPL
567480	2001 UR_{207}	—	October 20, 2001	Socorro	LINEAR	·	2.3 km	MPC · JPL
567481	2001 UK_{208}	—	September 20, 2001	Kitt Peak	Spacewatch	·	2.3 km	MPC · JPL
567482	2001 UE_{211}	—	October 21, 2001	Socorro	LINEAR	·	2.8 km	MPC · JPL
567483	2001 UF_{225}	—	October 23, 2001	Palomar	NEAT	·	3.0 km	MPC · JPL
567484	2001 UX_{225}	—	October 16, 2001	Palomar	NEAT	·	640 m	MPC · JPL
567485	2001 UE_{226}	—	October 14, 2001	Apache Point	SDSS	(5)	1.3 km	MPC · JPL
567486	2001 UB_{227}	—	October 16, 2001	Palomar	NEAT	·	2.5 km	MPC · JPL
567487	2001 UB_{231}	—	September 14, 2006	Kitt Peak	Spacewatch	·	1.7 km	MPC · JPL
567488	2001 UM_{232}	—	December 6, 2005	Kitt Peak	Spacewatch	·	820 m	MPC · JPL
567489	2001 UO_{232}	—	October 20, 2001	Palomar	NEAT	·	910 m	MPC · JPL
567490 Bánkyvilma	2001 UW_{232}	Bánkyvilma	October 25, 2012	Piszkéstető	K. Sárneczky, G. Hodosán	·	2.4 km	MPC · JPL
567491	2001 UA_{233}	—	October 25, 2001	Kitt Peak	Spacewatch	·	2.4 km	MPC · JPL
567492	2001 UC_{233}	—	February 24, 2014	Haleakala	Pan-STARRS 1	EOS	1.9 km	MPC · JPL
567493	2001 UD_{233}	—	September 17, 2006	Kitt Peak	Spacewatch	·	1.7 km	MPC · JPL
567494	2001 UO_{233}	—	October 23, 2001	Palomar	NEAT	·	1.7 km	MPC · JPL
567495	2001 UR_{233}	—	November 22, 2012	Kitt Peak	Spacewatch	·	2.1 km	MPC · JPL
567496	2001 US_{233}	—	October 27, 1997	Flagstaff	B. A. Skiff	(5)	1.2 km	MPC · JPL
567497	2001 UZ_{233}	—	October 24, 2001	Kitt Peak	Spacewatch	·	860 m	MPC · JPL
567498	2001 UP_{234}	—	May 18, 2015	Mount Lemmon	Mount Lemmon Survey	·	1.7 km	MPC · JPL
567499	2001 UQ_{234}	—	August 25, 2012	Haleakala	Pan-STARRS 1	·	1.1 km	MPC · JPL
567500	2001 UC_{235}	—	September 30, 2006	Mount Lemmon	Mount Lemmon Survey	·	1.5 km	MPC · JPL

== 567501–567600 ==
back to top

Designation			Discovery			Properties		Ref
Permanent	Provisional	Named after	Date	Site	Discoverer(s)	Category	Diam.	Ref
567501	2001 UR_{235}	—	September 10, 2015	Bergisch Gladbach	W. Bickel	·	1.9 km	MPC · JPL
567502	2001 UG_{236}	—	December 3, 2008	Kitt Peak	Spacewatch	·	700 m	MPC · JPL
567503	2001 VL_{69}	—	November 11, 2001	Socorro	LINEAR	EOS	2.0 km	MPC · JPL
567504	2001 VC_{100}	—	October 25, 2001	Socorro	LINEAR	H	520 m	MPC · JPL
567505	2001 VC_{126}	—	November 14, 2001	Kitt Peak	Spacewatch	EOS	2.3 km	MPC · JPL
567506	2001 VZ_{133}	—	November 12, 2001	Apache Point	SDSS Collaboration	·	1.0 km	MPC · JPL
567507	2001 VE_{134}	—	November 12, 2001	Apache Point	SDSS Collaboration	·	970 m	MPC · JPL
567508	2001 VJ_{134}	—	January 28, 2003	Kitt Peak	Spacewatch	·	2.0 km	MPC · JPL
567509	2001 VN_{134}	—	November 11, 2001	Apache Point	SDSS	·	2.1 km	MPC · JPL
567510	2001 VZ_{134}	—	March 11, 2011	Mayhill-ISON	L. Elenin	·	950 m	MPC · JPL
567511	2001 VA_{135}	—	September 23, 2012	Mount Lemmon	Mount Lemmon Survey	·	2.4 km	MPC · JPL
567512	2001 VG_{135}	—	October 23, 2012	Kitt Peak	Spacewatch	·	3.3 km	MPC · JPL
567513	2001 VL_{137}	—	October 25, 2013	Mount Lemmon	Mount Lemmon Survey	L5	7.7 km	MPC · JPL
567514	2001 WS_{25}	—	October 21, 2001	Socorro	LINEAR	·	3.8 km	MPC · JPL
567515	2001 WA_{32}	—	November 17, 2001	Socorro	LINEAR	·	2.9 km	MPC · JPL
567516	2001 WG_{33}	—	November 17, 2001	Socorro	LINEAR	·	2.4 km	MPC · JPL
567517	2001 WS_{43}	—	November 18, 2001	Socorro	LINEAR	·	3.1 km	MPC · JPL
567518	2001 WM_{56}	—	November 19, 2001	Socorro	LINEAR	EOS	2.1 km	MPC · JPL
567519	2001 WZ_{63}	—	November 12, 2001	Kitt Peak	Spacewatch	·	3.0 km	MPC · JPL
567520	2001 WT_{75}	—	November 20, 2001	Socorro	LINEAR	·	580 m	MPC · JPL
567521	2001 WB_{76}	—	November 20, 2001	Socorro	LINEAR	·	2.3 km	MPC · JPL
567522	2001 WC_{76}	—	November 11, 2001	Kitt Peak	Spacewatch	·	730 m	MPC · JPL
567523	2001 WA_{77}	—	November 11, 2001	Kitt Peak	Spacewatch	·	2.4 km	MPC · JPL
567524	2001 WX_{94}	—	November 20, 2001	Kitt Peak	Spacewatch	·	1.4 km	MPC · JPL
567525	2001 WW_{97}	—	November 9, 2001	Socorro	LINEAR	T_{j} (2.97)	3.1 km	MPC · JPL
567526	2001 WU_{104}	—	September 29, 2009	Kitt Peak	Spacewatch	H	430 m	MPC · JPL
567527	2001 WB_{105}	—	February 13, 2008	Mount Lemmon	Mount Lemmon Survey	·	2.4 km	MPC · JPL
567528	2001 WC_{105}	—	September 24, 2011	Mount Lemmon	Mount Lemmon Survey	·	540 m	MPC · JPL
567529	2001 WE_{106}	—	November 21, 2001	Apache Point	SDSS Collaboration	·	1.2 km	MPC · JPL
567530	2001 WY_{106}	—	February 10, 2008	Mount Lemmon	Mount Lemmon Survey	L5	8.0 km	MPC · JPL
567531	2001 XR_{93}	—	December 10, 2001	Socorro	LINEAR	·	1.8 km	MPC · JPL
567532	2001 XN_{105}	—	December 14, 2001	Socorro	LINEAR	H	390 m	MPC · JPL
567533	2001 XS_{130}	—	December 14, 2001	Socorro	LINEAR	MAR	1.3 km	MPC · JPL
567534	2001 XM_{143}	—	December 14, 2001	Socorro	LINEAR	·	680 m	MPC · JPL
567535	2001 XL_{161}	—	November 20, 2001	Socorro	LINEAR	·	760 m	MPC · JPL
567536	2001 XJ_{219}	—	November 21, 2001	Haleakala	NEAT	H	400 m	MPC · JPL
567537	2001 XD_{268}	—	February 28, 2014	Mount Lemmon	Mount Lemmon Survey	EOS	1.7 km	MPC · JPL
567538	2001 XG_{268}	—	December 10, 2005	Kitt Peak	Spacewatch	·	1.7 km	MPC · JPL
567539	2001 XW_{268}	—	October 28, 2006	Mount Lemmon	Mount Lemmon Survey	·	3.4 km	MPC · JPL
567540	2001 XZ_{268}	—	November 6, 2005	Mount Lemmon	Mount Lemmon Survey	·	1.3 km	MPC · JPL
567541	2001 XH_{269}	—	September 18, 2009	Mount Lemmon	Mount Lemmon Survey	EUN	860 m	MPC · JPL
567542	2001 XN_{269}	—	January 26, 2014	Haleakala	Pan-STARRS 1	·	1.0 km	MPC · JPL
567543	2001 XP_{269}	—	February 27, 2009	Kitt Peak	Spacewatch	·	2.1 km	MPC · JPL
567544	2001 YD_{28}	—	December 18, 2001	Socorro	LINEAR	·	2.4 km	MPC · JPL
567545	2001 YK_{34}	—	December 18, 2001	Socorro	LINEAR	EOS	2.3 km	MPC · JPL
567546	2001 YX_{56}	—	December 18, 2001	Socorro	LINEAR	·	2.3 km	MPC · JPL
567547	2001 YQ_{92}	—	December 17, 2001	Kitt Peak	Spacewatch	·	1.7 km	MPC · JPL
567548	2001 YH_{147}	—	December 15, 2001	Socorro	LINEAR	·	4.1 km	MPC · JPL
567549	2001 YQ_{150}	—	December 19, 2001	Socorro	LINEAR	·	1.5 km	MPC · JPL
567550	2001 YN_{162}	—	January 28, 2011	Kitt Peak	Spacewatch	·	1.8 km	MPC · JPL
567551	2001 YQ_{162}	—	September 23, 2011	Haleakala	Pan-STARRS 1	·	3.8 km	MPC · JPL
567552	2001 YS_{162}	—	December 23, 2001	Kitt Peak	Spacewatch	EOS	2.0 km	MPC · JPL
567553	2001 YU_{162}	—	May 21, 2015	Haleakala	Pan-STARRS 1	·	2.6 km	MPC · JPL
567554	2001 YB_{163}	—	January 26, 2015	Haleakala	Pan-STARRS 1	·	1.1 km	MPC · JPL
567555	2001 YO_{163}	—	October 21, 2011	Mount Lemmon	Mount Lemmon Survey	EOS	1.8 km	MPC · JPL
567556	2001 YD_{165}	—	April 12, 2015	Haleakala	Pan-STARRS 1	·	2.8 km	MPC · JPL
567557	2001 YQ_{165}	—	March 8, 2014	Mount Lemmon	Mount Lemmon Survey	·	2.7 km	MPC · JPL
567558	2001 YR_{165}	—	September 23, 2011	Mount Lemmon	Mount Lemmon Survey	·	590 m	MPC · JPL
567559	2002 AA_{16}	—	December 17, 2001	Socorro	LINEAR	T_{j} (2.86)	3.0 km	MPC · JPL
567560	2002 AJ_{48}	—	January 9, 2002	Socorro	LINEAR	·	1.7 km	MPC · JPL
567561	2002 AY_{77}	—	January 8, 2002	Socorro	LINEAR	·	2.2 km	MPC · JPL
567562	2002 AL_{94}	—	December 18, 2001	Palomar	NEAT	·	1.6 km	MPC · JPL
567563	2002 AX_{97}	—	January 8, 2002	Socorro	LINEAR	·	3.2 km	MPC · JPL
567564	2002 AP_{98}	—	December 17, 2001	Palomar	NEAT	·	810 m	MPC · JPL
567565	2002 AB_{127}	—	January 8, 2002	Kitt Peak	Spacewatch	·	770 m	MPC · JPL
567566	2002 AN_{175}	—	January 12, 2002	Palomar	NEAT	·	3.4 km	MPC · JPL
567567	2002 AK_{191}	—	January 13, 2002	Kitt Peak	Spacewatch	·	1.3 km	MPC · JPL
567568	2002 AC_{192}	—	January 12, 2002	Kitt Peak	Spacewatch	·	2.6 km	MPC · JPL
567569	2002 AM_{192}	—	January 12, 2002	Kitt Peak	Spacewatch	·	640 m	MPC · JPL
567570	2002 AB_{211}	—	November 17, 2006	Kitt Peak	Spacewatch	EOS	2.3 km	MPC · JPL
567571	2002 AE_{211}	—	October 23, 2012	Mount Lemmon	Mount Lemmon Survey	·	2.6 km	MPC · JPL
567572	2002 AF_{211}	—	September 29, 2011	Mount Lemmon	Mount Lemmon Survey	·	2.7 km	MPC · JPL
567573	2002 AH_{211}	—	January 9, 2002	Kitt Peak	Spacewatch	·	2.7 km	MPC · JPL
567574	2002 AM_{211}	—	March 26, 2014	Mount Lemmon	Mount Lemmon Survey	·	2.6 km	MPC · JPL
567575	2002 AY_{211}	—	February 24, 2014	Haleakala	Pan-STARRS 1	VER	2.4 km	MPC · JPL
567576	2002 AF_{212}	—	February 8, 2013	Haleakala	Pan-STARRS 1	·	910 m	MPC · JPL
567577	2002 AV_{212}	—	March 18, 2007	Kitt Peak	Spacewatch	·	1.3 km	MPC · JPL
567578	2002 AY_{212}	—	November 27, 2013	Haleakala	Pan-STARRS 1	·	1.2 km	MPC · JPL
567579	2002 AB_{213}	—	September 26, 2011	Haleakala	Pan-STARRS 1	·	410 m	MPC · JPL
567580 Latuni	2002 AN_{214}	Latuni	October 23, 2017	Baldone	K. Černis, I. Eglītis	EOS	1.8 km	MPC · JPL
567581	2002 AC_{216}	—	October 1, 2011	Piszkéstető	K. Sárneczky	·	2.2 km	MPC · JPL
567582	2002 AE_{216}	—	February 27, 2014	Haleakala	Pan-STARRS 1	·	2.2 km	MPC · JPL
567583	2002 AC_{217}	—	January 5, 2002	Kitt Peak	Spacewatch	EOS	1.9 km	MPC · JPL
567584	2002 BJ_{32}	—	January 18, 2002	Palomar	NEAT	·	3.0 km	MPC · JPL
567585	2002 BX_{32}	—	July 12, 2015	Haleakala	Pan-STARRS 1	·	2.0 km	MPC · JPL
567586	2002 BY_{32}	—	June 22, 2004	Kitt Peak	Spacewatch	·	3.1 km	MPC · JPL
567587	2002 BA_{33}	—	February 8, 2008	Kitt Peak	Spacewatch	·	2.7 km	MPC · JPL
567588	2002 BC_{33}	—	January 26, 2015	Haleakala	Pan-STARRS 1	·	1.4 km	MPC · JPL
567589	2002 BQ_{33}	—	October 14, 2009	Mount Lemmon	Mount Lemmon Survey	·	1.2 km	MPC · JPL
567590	2002 CY_{8}	—	February 6, 2002	Kitt Peak	Spacewatch	·	1.1 km	MPC · JPL
567591	2002 CH_{14}	—	February 7, 2002	Socorro	LINEAR	H	430 m	MPC · JPL
567592	2002 CM_{14}	—	February 4, 2002	Palomar	NEAT	H	470 m	MPC · JPL
567593	2002 CV_{17}	—	January 8, 2002	Socorro	LINEAR	·	1.5 km	MPC · JPL
567594	2002 CU_{29}	—	January 7, 2002	Kitt Peak	Spacewatch	·	1.5 km	MPC · JPL
567595	2002 CP_{85}	—	February 7, 2002	Socorro	LINEAR	BAR	880 m	MPC · JPL
567596	2002 CZ_{87}	—	February 7, 2002	Kitt Peak	Spacewatch	·	990 m	MPC · JPL
567597	2002 CW_{152}	—	February 6, 2002	Palomar	NEAT	H	420 m	MPC · JPL
567598	2002 CG_{177}	—	February 10, 2002	Socorro	LINEAR	·	3.1 km	MPC · JPL
567599	2002 CZ_{180}	—	January 12, 2002	Palomar	NEAT	EOS	2.2 km	MPC · JPL
567600	2002 CR_{191}	—	February 10, 2002	Socorro	LINEAR	·	800 m	MPC · JPL

== 567601–567700 ==
back to top

Designation			Discovery			Properties		Ref
Permanent	Provisional	Named after	Date	Site	Discoverer(s)	Category	Diam.	Ref
567601	2002 CS_{234}	—	February 8, 2002	Kitt Peak	Spacewatch	·	950 m	MPC · JPL
567602	2002 CH_{257}	—	February 8, 2002	Kitt Peak	Spacewatch	·	2.7 km	MPC · JPL
567603	2002 CJ_{264}	—	February 9, 2002	Kitt Peak	Spacewatch	·	2.0 km	MPC · JPL
567604	2002 CG_{267}	—	February 7, 2002	Kitt Peak	Spacewatch	HNS	1.0 km	MPC · JPL
567605	2002 CO_{267}	—	February 7, 2002	Kitt Peak	Spacewatch	VER	2.6 km	MPC · JPL
567606	2002 CA_{278}	—	February 7, 2002	Palomar	NEAT	·	570 m	MPC · JPL
567607	2002 CN_{286}	—	February 10, 2002	Socorro	LINEAR	EUN	1.3 km	MPC · JPL
567608	2002 CL_{316}	—	February 5, 2002	Palomar	NEAT	·	1.5 km	MPC · JPL
567609	2002 CB_{317}	—	February 6, 2002	Palomar	NEAT	·	3.0 km	MPC · JPL
567610	2002 CE_{318}	—	April 22, 2007	Kitt Peak	Spacewatch	·	1.2 km	MPC · JPL
567611	2002 CH_{318}	—	December 14, 2006	Palomar	NEAT	H	660 m	MPC · JPL
567612	2002 CW_{318}	—	February 13, 2002	Kitt Peak	Spacewatch	·	3.0 km	MPC · JPL
567613	2002 CA_{319}	—	December 24, 2005	Kitt Peak	Spacewatch	·	1.3 km	MPC · JPL
567614	2002 CD_{319}	—	February 13, 2002	Kitt Peak	Spacewatch	·	1.5 km	MPC · JPL
567615	2002 CF_{319}	—	February 21, 2002	Kitt Peak	Spacewatch	·	3.0 km	MPC · JPL
567616	2002 CO_{319}	—	March 12, 2002	Kitt Peak	Spacewatch	·	1.5 km	MPC · JPL
567617	2002 CP_{319}	—	January 27, 2007	Mount Lemmon	Mount Lemmon Survey	·	1.9 km	MPC · JPL
567618	2002 CQ_{319}	—	April 5, 2014	Haleakala	Pan-STARRS 1	URS	2.4 km	MPC · JPL
567619	2002 CT_{319}	—	June 14, 2015	Mount Lemmon	Mount Lemmon Survey	·	3.3 km	MPC · JPL
567620	2002 CH_{320}	—	February 13, 2002	Apache Point	SDSS Collaboration	TIR	2.5 km	MPC · JPL
567621	2002 CL_{320}	—	February 8, 2002	Kitt Peak	Deep Ecliptic Survey	·	1.8 km	MPC · JPL
567622	2002 CM_{320}	—	March 8, 2008	Kitt Peak	Spacewatch	URS	3.3 km	MPC · JPL
567623	2002 CT_{320}	—	March 8, 2013	Haleakala	Pan-STARRS 1	·	850 m	MPC · JPL
567624	2002 CV_{320}	—	September 30, 2011	Mount Lemmon	Mount Lemmon Survey	·	2.0 km	MPC · JPL
567625	2002 CC_{321}	—	August 27, 2011	Haleakala	Pan-STARRS 1	HYG	2.3 km	MPC · JPL
567626	2002 CE_{321}	—	October 25, 2011	Haleakala	Pan-STARRS 1	·	620 m	MPC · JPL
567627	2002 CT_{321}	—	October 28, 2017	Haleakala	Pan-STARRS 1	·	2.5 km	MPC · JPL
567628	2002 CP_{322}	—	February 15, 2013	Haleakala	Pan-STARRS 1	·	700 m	MPC · JPL
567629	2002 CX_{323}	—	March 30, 2015	Haleakala	Pan-STARRS 1	·	890 m	MPC · JPL
567630	2002 CS_{324}	—	February 14, 2013	Kitt Peak	Spacewatch	·	880 m	MPC · JPL
567631	2002 CU_{324}	—	August 16, 2017	Haleakala	Pan-STARRS 1	·	1.2 km	MPC · JPL
567632	2002 CH_{325}	—	February 13, 2002	Apache Point	SDSS Collaboration	·	2.9 km	MPC · JPL
567633	2002 CN_{325}	—	September 24, 2011	Haleakala	Pan-STARRS 1	EOS	1.6 km	MPC · JPL
567634	2002 CS_{325}	—	February 6, 2002	Kitt Peak	Deep Ecliptic Survey	ADE	1.8 km	MPC · JPL
567635	2002 CF_{326}	—	September 4, 2015	Kitt Peak	Spacewatch	·	1.9 km	MPC · JPL
567636	2002 CG_{326}	—	May 28, 2014	Mount Lemmon	Mount Lemmon Survey	THM	2.0 km	MPC · JPL
567637	2002 CM_{327}	—	February 10, 2011	Mount Lemmon	Mount Lemmon Survey	·	1.7 km	MPC · JPL
567638	2002 CT_{327}	—	February 13, 2002	Apache Point	SDSS Collaboration	·	2.4 km	MPC · JPL
567639	2002 CQ_{328}	—	February 12, 2002	Kitt Peak	Spacewatch	·	2.8 km	MPC · JPL
567640	2002 DB_{7}	—	February 20, 2002	Kitt Peak	Spacewatch	·	2.5 km	MPC · JPL
567641	2002 DD_{22}	—	February 2, 2008	Kitt Peak	Spacewatch	·	2.9 km	MPC · JPL
567642	2002 DG_{22}	—	October 9, 2013	Mount Lemmon	Mount Lemmon Survey	·	1.4 km	MPC · JPL
567643	2002 DH_{22}	—	February 20, 2002	Kitt Peak	Spacewatch	·	2.6 km	MPC · JPL
567644	2002 EQ_{3}	—	March 11, 2002	Kitt Peak	Spacewatch	·	3.2 km	MPC · JPL
567645	2002 EF_{10}	—	March 12, 2002	Palomar	NEAT	·	1.7 km	MPC · JPL
567646	2002 EL_{36}	—	March 9, 2002	Kitt Peak	Spacewatch	·	670 m	MPC · JPL
567647	2002 EV_{77}	—	March 11, 2002	Kitt Peak	Spacewatch	·	2.7 km	MPC · JPL
567648	2002 EU_{103}	—	March 9, 2002	Kitt Peak	Spacewatch	·	1.3 km	MPC · JPL
567649	2002 ER_{106}	—	March 3, 2002	Haleakala	NEAT	·	1.8 km	MPC · JPL
567650	2002 EQ_{108}	—	March 9, 2002	Palomar	NEAT	·	1.7 km	MPC · JPL
567651	2002 EM_{130}	—	February 7, 2002	Palomar	NEAT	·	1.8 km	MPC · JPL
567652	2002 EF_{138}	—	February 20, 2002	Kitt Peak	Spacewatch	·	1.9 km	MPC · JPL
567653	2002 EC_{139}	—	March 6, 2002	Palomar	NEAT	·	1.6 km	MPC · JPL
567654	2002 ER_{161}	—	March 6, 2002	Palomar	NEAT	LIX	3.0 km	MPC · JPL
567655	2002 EG_{163}	—	March 6, 2002	Palomar	NEAT	EUN	1.1 km	MPC · JPL
567656	2002 EF_{164}	—	December 22, 2008	Kitt Peak	Spacewatch	MAS	600 m	MPC · JPL
567657	2002 EJ_{164}	—	March 11, 2002	Palomar	NEAT	·	1.2 km	MPC · JPL
567658	2002 EY_{164}	—	April 8, 2008	Kitt Peak	Spacewatch	·	2.8 km	MPC · JPL
567659	2002 EB_{165}	—	January 10, 2007	Kitt Peak	Spacewatch	·	2.8 km	MPC · JPL
567660	2002 EH_{165}	—	March 6, 2013	Haleakala	Pan-STARRS 1	·	2.7 km	MPC · JPL
567661	2002 EN_{165}	—	August 25, 2004	Kitt Peak	Spacewatch	·	2.4 km	MPC · JPL
567662	2002 EO_{165}	—	October 25, 2011	Haleakala	Pan-STARRS 1	EOS	1.9 km	MPC · JPL
567663	2002 ER_{165}	—	July 9, 2010	Siding Spring	SSS	·	1.0 km	MPC · JPL
567664	2002 EU_{165}	—	May 7, 2006	Kitt Peak	Spacewatch	·	1.1 km	MPC · JPL
567665	2002 EE_{166}	—	January 18, 2013	Kitt Peak	Spacewatch	THM	1.9 km	MPC · JPL
567666	2002 EF_{166}	—	January 28, 2006	Mount Lemmon	Mount Lemmon Survey	·	1.4 km	MPC · JPL
567667	2002 ER_{166}	—	March 27, 2008	Mount Lemmon	Mount Lemmon Survey	·	2.7 km	MPC · JPL
567668	2002 ED_{167}	—	June 3, 2016	ESA OGS	ESA OGS	·	1.4 km	MPC · JPL
567669	2002 EG_{167}	—	October 26, 2011	Haleakala	Pan-STARRS 1	·	680 m	MPC · JPL
567670	2002 ER_{167}	—	August 8, 2016	Haleakala	Pan-STARRS 1	·	2.5 km	MPC · JPL
567671	2002 ET_{167}	—	September 3, 2008	Kitt Peak	Spacewatch	HNS	890 m	MPC · JPL
567672	2002 EW_{167}	—	September 20, 2011	Mount Lemmon	Mount Lemmon Survey	·	2.2 km	MPC · JPL
567673	2002 EZ_{167}	—	September 21, 2003	Kitt Peak	Spacewatch	·	830 m	MPC · JPL
567674	2002 EF_{169}	—	April 14, 2008	Mount Lemmon	Mount Lemmon Survey	·	3.0 km	MPC · JPL
567675	2002 EH_{169}	—	October 24, 2015	Haleakala	Pan-STARRS 1	·	2.2 km	MPC · JPL
567676	2002 EO_{169}	—	July 25, 2014	Haleakala	Pan-STARRS 1	·	1.9 km	MPC · JPL
567677	2002 EC_{170}	—	January 27, 2007	Kitt Peak	Spacewatch	·	3.0 km	MPC · JPL
567678	2002 EF_{170}	—	August 8, 2016	Haleakala	Pan-STARRS 1	·	1.0 km	MPC · JPL
567679	2002 EZ_{170}	—	February 9, 2013	Haleakala	Pan-STARRS 1	THM	1.9 km	MPC · JPL
567680	2002 EL_{171}	—	July 25, 2014	Haleakala	Pan-STARRS 1	·	590 m	MPC · JPL
567681	2002 FB_{11}	—	March 6, 2002	Palomar	NEAT	·	2.0 km	MPC · JPL
567682	2002 FH_{18}	—	March 18, 2002	Kitt Peak	Deep Ecliptic Survey	LEO	1.7 km	MPC · JPL
567683	2002 FB_{42}	—	March 5, 2013	Mount Lemmon	Mount Lemmon Survey	·	2.5 km	MPC · JPL
567684	2002 FC_{42}	—	September 5, 2010	Mount Lemmon	Mount Lemmon Survey	VER	2.6 km	MPC · JPL
567685	2002 FJ_{42}	—	January 7, 2006	Mount Lemmon	Mount Lemmon Survey	·	1.1 km	MPC · JPL
567686	2002 FR_{42}	—	March 21, 2002	Kitt Peak	Spacewatch	AGN	1.1 km	MPC · JPL
567687	2002 FS_{42}	—	February 17, 2013	Mount Lemmon	Mount Lemmon Survey	·	2.3 km	MPC · JPL
567688	2002 FT_{43}	—	September 9, 2007	Mount Lemmon	Mount Lemmon Survey	·	770 m	MPC · JPL
567689	2002 GX_{35}	—	April 2, 2002	Kitt Peak	Spacewatch	·	3.0 km	MPC · JPL
567690	2002 GW_{57}	—	April 8, 2002	Kitt Peak	Spacewatch	·	3.1 km	MPC · JPL
567691	2002 GQ_{156}	—	April 13, 2002	Palomar	NEAT	·	730 m	MPC · JPL
567692	2002 GU_{185}	—	April 9, 2002	Palomar	NEAT	NEM	2.1 km	MPC · JPL
567693	2002 GB_{187}	—	April 8, 2002	Palomar	NEAT	NYS	990 m	MPC · JPL
567694	2002 GD_{189}	—	April 9, 2002	Palomar	NEAT	·	940 m	MPC · JPL
567695	2002 GB_{191}	—	January 26, 2006	Mount Lemmon	Mount Lemmon Survey	AEO	1.3 km	MPC · JPL
567696	2002 GS_{192}	—	October 21, 2011	Kitt Peak	Spacewatch	·	3.2 km	MPC · JPL
567697	2002 GV_{192}	—	February 8, 2013	Kitt Peak	Spacewatch	·	2.5 km	MPC · JPL
567698	2002 GD_{193}	—	February 11, 2014	Mount Lemmon	Mount Lemmon Survey	MAR	1.1 km	MPC · JPL
567699	2002 GE_{193}	—	April 17, 2002	Kitt Peak	Spacewatch	·	2.8 km	MPC · JPL
567700	2002 GJ_{193}	—	June 3, 2008	Kitt Peak	Spacewatch	·	2.1 km	MPC · JPL

== 567701–567800 ==
back to top

Designation			Discovery			Properties		Ref
Permanent	Provisional	Named after	Date	Site	Discoverer(s)	Category	Diam.	Ref
567701	2002 GS_{193}	—	October 2, 2008	Kitt Peak	Spacewatch	·	1.8 km	MPC · JPL
567702	2002 GM_{194}	—	October 7, 2013	Kitt Peak	Spacewatch	·	1.9 km	MPC · JPL
567703	2002 GY_{194}	—	September 23, 2008	Mount Lemmon	Mount Lemmon Survey	·	1.3 km	MPC · JPL
567704	2002 GG_{195}	—	October 17, 2010	Mount Lemmon	Mount Lemmon Survey	·	2.1 km	MPC · JPL
567705	2002 GS_{195}	—	February 17, 2015	Haleakala	Pan-STARRS 1	·	1.8 km	MPC · JPL
567706	2002 GH_{196}	—	May 20, 2015	Cerro Tololo	DECam	·	950 m	MPC · JPL
567707	2002 GS_{196}	—	October 1, 2011	Kitt Peak	Spacewatch	·	3.2 km	MPC · JPL
567708	2002 HX_{5}	—	March 20, 2002	Kitt Peak	Spacewatch	·	940 m	MPC · JPL
567709	2002 HZ_{17}	—	April 14, 2002	Socorro	LINEAR	·	1.8 km	MPC · JPL
567710	2002 JM_{3}	—	May 4, 2002	Kitt Peak	Spacewatch	·	1.1 km	MPC · JPL
567711	2002 JO_{91}	—	May 11, 2002	Socorro	LINEAR	·	1.5 km	MPC · JPL
567712	2002 JU_{120}	—	April 12, 2002	Palomar	NEAT	·	2.0 km	MPC · JPL
567713	2002 JB_{121}	—	May 5, 2002	Palomar	NEAT	·	2.4 km	MPC · JPL
567714	2002 JX_{136}	—	May 9, 2002	Palomar	NEAT	·	1.2 km	MPC · JPL
567715	2002 JU_{140}	—	May 10, 2002	Kitt Peak	Spacewatch	·	2.3 km	MPC · JPL
567716	2002 JZ_{140}	—	May 10, 2002	Kitt Peak	Spacewatch	·	1.8 km	MPC · JPL
567717	2002 JQ_{144}	—	May 13, 2002	Palomar	NEAT	·	2.0 km	MPC · JPL
567718	2002 JK_{151}	—	April 5, 2011	Catalina	CSS	·	2.3 km	MPC · JPL
567719	2002 JS_{151}	—	January 20, 2015	Haleakala	Pan-STARRS 1	·	980 m	MPC · JPL
567720	2002 JF_{152}	—	March 3, 2009	Kitt Peak	Spacewatch	·	1.1 km	MPC · JPL
567721	2002 JJ_{152}	—	March 28, 2015	Haleakala	Pan-STARRS 1	·	1.3 km	MPC · JPL
567722	2002 JN_{152}	—	July 21, 2006	Mount Lemmon	Mount Lemmon Survey	·	710 m	MPC · JPL
567723	2002 JR_{152}	—	March 17, 2009	Catalina	CSS	·	1.3 km	MPC · JPL
567724	2002 JU_{152}	—	September 18, 2006	Kitt Peak	Spacewatch	·	560 m	MPC · JPL
567725	2002 JW_{152}	—	January 28, 2014	Mount Lemmon	Mount Lemmon Survey	EUN	1.2 km	MPC · JPL
567726	2002 JC_{153}	—	October 1, 2010	Mount Lemmon	Mount Lemmon Survey	·	2.8 km	MPC · JPL
567727	2002 JD_{153}	—	April 10, 2013	Haleakala	Pan-STARRS 1	·	2.9 km	MPC · JPL
567728	2002 KY_{7}	—	May 13, 2002	Palomar	NEAT	·	1.8 km	MPC · JPL
567729	2002 KS_{15}	—	May 18, 2002	Palomar	NEAT	·	1.4 km	MPC · JPL
567730	2002 KN_{16}	—	September 26, 2003	Apache Point	SDSS Collaboration	DOR	2.2 km	MPC · JPL
567731	2002 KA_{17}	—	May 7, 2010	Mount Lemmon	Mount Lemmon Survey	H	520 m	MPC · JPL
567732	2002 KG_{17}	—	March 27, 2011	Mount Lemmon	Mount Lemmon Survey	DOR	2.0 km	MPC · JPL
567733	2002 KJ_{17}	—	November 19, 2009	Mount Lemmon	Mount Lemmon Survey	·	1.5 km	MPC · JPL
567734	2002 KN_{17}	—	November 28, 2010	Mount Lemmon	Mount Lemmon Survey	·	3.3 km	MPC · JPL
567735	2002 LC_{52}	—	June 9, 2002	Socorro	LINEAR	·	2.6 km	MPC · JPL
567736	2002 LJ_{63}	—	October 7, 2008	Mount Lemmon	Mount Lemmon Survey	·	2.4 km	MPC · JPL
567737	2002 LD_{64}	—	June 2, 2002	Palomar	NEAT	·	2.4 km	MPC · JPL
567738	2002 LN_{65}	—	March 1, 2005	Catalina	CSS	·	1.6 km	MPC · JPL
567739	2002 MB_{8}	—	May 22, 2011	Kitt Peak	Spacewatch	(18466)	1.9 km	MPC · JPL
567740	2002 MD_{8}	—	October 18, 2012	Mount Lemmon	Mount Lemmon Survey	·	2.0 km	MPC · JPL
567741	2002 MG_{8}	—	October 12, 2007	Mount Lemmon	Mount Lemmon Survey	·	2.0 km	MPC · JPL
567742	2002 NC_{6}	—	July 11, 2002	Campo Imperatore	CINEOS	·	650 m	MPC · JPL
567743	2002 NV_{57}	—	August 6, 2002	Palomar	NEAT	·	2.8 km	MPC · JPL
567744	2002 NS_{65}	—	August 9, 2002	Haleakala	NEAT	·	1.3 km	MPC · JPL
567745	2002 NS_{66}	—	July 5, 2002	Palomar	NEAT	·	460 m	MPC · JPL
567746	2002 NO_{69}	—	April 25, 2006	Kitt Peak	Spacewatch	EUN	990 m	MPC · JPL
567747	2002 NG_{70}	—	July 9, 2002	Palomar	NEAT	·	2.5 km	MPC · JPL
567748	2002 NW_{71}	—	July 9, 2002	Palomar	NEAT	·	1.2 km	MPC · JPL
567749	2002 NB_{75}	—	July 8, 2002	Palomar	NEAT	·	2.1 km	MPC · JPL
567750	2002 NC_{76}	—	July 12, 2002	Palomar	NEAT	·	1.4 km	MPC · JPL
567751	2002 NE_{76}	—	September 13, 2007	Mount Lemmon	Mount Lemmon Survey	·	1.9 km	MPC · JPL
567752	2002 NC_{78}	—	July 5, 2002	Palomar	NEAT	·	1.9 km	MPC · JPL
567753	2002 NH_{78}	—	July 4, 2002	Palomar	NEAT	·	770 m	MPC · JPL
567754	2002 NL_{78}	—	November 8, 2007	Kitt Peak	Spacewatch	·	1.4 km	MPC · JPL
567755	2002 NW_{78}	—	April 8, 2006	Kitt Peak	Spacewatch	·	1.2 km	MPC · JPL
567756	2002 NN_{79}	—	July 14, 2002	Palomar	NEAT	·	770 m	MPC · JPL
567757	2002 NW_{82}	—	November 3, 2010	Mount Lemmon	Mount Lemmon Survey	NYS	980 m	MPC · JPL
567758	2002 NZ_{82}	—	March 13, 2005	Kitt Peak	Spacewatch	·	640 m	MPC · JPL
567759	2002 NA_{83}	—	September 6, 2008	Mount Lemmon	Mount Lemmon Survey	LIX	3.1 km	MPC · JPL
567760	2002 NC_{83}	—	August 5, 2002	Palomar	NEAT	·	1.1 km	MPC · JPL
567761	2002 OK_{30}	—	August 24, 2007	Kitt Peak	Spacewatch	·	1.8 km	MPC · JPL
567762	2002 OO_{31}	—	March 9, 2005	Mount Lemmon	Mount Lemmon Survey	·	920 m	MPC · JPL
567763	2002 OV_{35}	—	July 21, 2002	Palomar	NEAT	V	520 m	MPC · JPL
567764	2002 OW_{35}	—	August 5, 2002	Palomar	NEAT	·	1.1 km	MPC · JPL
567765	2002 OX_{35}	—	July 21, 2002	Palomar	NEAT	PHO	740 m	MPC · JPL
567766	2002 PA_{2}	—	August 5, 2002	Palomar	NEAT	·	1.7 km	MPC · JPL
567767	2002 PZ_{6}	—	August 6, 2002	Palomar	NEAT	JUN	810 m	MPC · JPL
567768	2002 PA_{7}	—	July 12, 2002	Palomar	NEAT	H	680 m	MPC · JPL
567769	2002 PM_{17}	—	July 12, 2002	Palomar	NEAT	·	2.7 km	MPC · JPL
567770	2002 PP_{17}	—	August 6, 2002	Palomar	NEAT	·	2.9 km	MPC · JPL
567771	2002 PR_{18}	—	August 6, 2002	Palomar	NEAT	·	2.9 km	MPC · JPL
567772	2002 PL_{20}	—	July 18, 2002	Palomar	NEAT	·	1.1 km	MPC · JPL
567773	2002 PF_{123}	—	August 15, 2002	Palomar	NEAT	·	630 m	MPC · JPL
567774	2002 PN_{143}	—	August 9, 2002	Cerro Tololo	Deep Ecliptic Survey	·	1.5 km	MPC · JPL
567775	2002 PC_{154}	—	August 9, 2002	Cerro Tololo	Deep Ecliptic Survey	·	1.5 km	MPC · JPL
567776	2002 PO_{167}	—	August 15, 2002	Palomar	NEAT	EUN	950 m	MPC · JPL
567777	2002 PP_{172}	—	August 8, 2002	Palomar	NEAT	H	500 m	MPC · JPL
567778	2002 PC_{181}	—	July 15, 2002	Palomar	NEAT	(5)	990 m	MPC · JPL
567779	2002 PW_{195}	—	August 7, 2002	Palomar	NEAT	·	1 km	MPC · JPL
567780	2002 PU_{199}	—	October 10, 2007	Kitt Peak	Spacewatch	·	1.2 km	MPC · JPL
567781	2002 PR_{200}	—	August 11, 2002	Palomar	NEAT	·	860 m	MPC · JPL
567782	2002 PT_{200}	—	August 11, 2002	Palomar	NEAT	GEF	1.4 km	MPC · JPL
567783	2002 PR_{202}	—	August 11, 2002	Palomar	NEAT	·	740 m	MPC · JPL
567784	2002 PS_{202}	—	October 3, 2006	Mount Lemmon	Mount Lemmon Survey	·	1.1 km	MPC · JPL
567785	2002 PV_{204}	—	August 4, 2002	Palomar	NEAT	·	1.5 km	MPC · JPL
567786	2002 QT_{31}	—	August 19, 2002	Palomar	NEAT	·	640 m	MPC · JPL
567787	2002 QJ_{44}	—	August 13, 2002	Palomar	NEAT	·	610 m	MPC · JPL
567788	2002 QW_{54}	—	August 29, 2002	Palomar	NEAT	H	510 m	MPC · JPL
567789	2002 QN_{66}	—	August 18, 2002	Palomar	NEAT	·	550 m	MPC · JPL
567790	2002 QK_{68}	—	August 12, 2002	Cerro Tololo	Deep Ecliptic Survey	·	3.6 km	MPC · JPL
567791	2002 QY_{71}	—	August 27, 2002	Palomar	NEAT	·	1.5 km	MPC · JPL
567792	2002 QS_{76}	—	August 18, 2002	Palomar	NEAT	·	3.0 km	MPC · JPL
567793	2002 QB_{80}	—	July 21, 2002	Palomar	NEAT	H	430 m	MPC · JPL
567794	2002 QV_{82}	—	August 16, 2002	Palomar	NEAT	H	410 m	MPC · JPL
567795	2002 QK_{89}	—	March 4, 2005	Mount Lemmon	Mount Lemmon Survey	·	2.3 km	MPC · JPL
567796	2002 QZ_{92}	—	August 19, 2002	Palomar	NEAT	AGN	1.2 km	MPC · JPL
567797	2002 QT_{94}	—	August 27, 2002	Palomar	NEAT	·	710 m	MPC · JPL
567798	2002 QN_{97}	—	August 18, 2002	Palomar	NEAT	GEF	1.0 km	MPC · JPL
567799	2002 QR_{104}	—	August 27, 2002	Palomar	NEAT	·	2.2 km	MPC · JPL
567800	2002 QM_{109}	—	August 17, 2002	Palomar	NEAT	·	1.0 km	MPC · JPL

== 567801–567900 ==
back to top

Designation			Discovery			Properties		Ref
Permanent	Provisional	Named after	Date	Site	Discoverer(s)	Category	Diam.	Ref
567801	2002 QZ_{109}	—	August 9, 2002	Cerro Tololo	Deep Ecliptic Survey	·	1.1 km	MPC · JPL
567802	2002 QF_{113}	—	October 5, 2002	Apache Point	SDSS Collaboration	·	2.9 km	MPC · JPL
567803	2002 QT_{114}	—	August 28, 2002	Palomar	NEAT	·	1.6 km	MPC · JPL
567804	2002 QC_{131}	—	August 30, 2002	Palomar	NEAT	·	2.4 km	MPC · JPL
567805	2002 QL_{131}	—	August 30, 2002	Palomar	NEAT	·	890 m	MPC · JPL
567806	2002 QN_{134}	—	August 30, 2002	Palomar	NEAT	·	1.5 km	MPC · JPL
567807	2002 QX_{143}	—	December 20, 2009	Kitt Peak	Spacewatch	·	2.5 km	MPC · JPL
567808	2002 QU_{147}	—	August 30, 2002	Palomar	NEAT	AGN	1.5 km	MPC · JPL
567809	2002 QL_{148}	—	September 9, 2007	La Palma	La Palma	BRA	1.5 km	MPC · JPL
567810	2002 QO_{153}	—	June 3, 2011	Mount Lemmon	Mount Lemmon Survey	·	1.9 km	MPC · JPL
567811	2002 QV_{153}	—	August 28, 2002	Palomar	NEAT	(16286)	2.4 km	MPC · JPL
567812	2002 QK_{155}	—	November 29, 2011	Kitt Peak	Spacewatch	·	1.1 km	MPC · JPL
567813	2002 QV_{155}	—	August 28, 2002	Palomar	NEAT	·	930 m	MPC · JPL
567814	2002 QY_{158}	—	September 25, 2012	Mount Lemmon	Mount Lemmon Survey	·	1.5 km	MPC · JPL
567815	2002 QE_{159}	—	November 9, 2013	Haleakala	Pan-STARRS 1	·	650 m	MPC · JPL
567816	2002 QL_{159}	—	February 26, 2014	Haleakala	Pan-STARRS 1	·	580 m	MPC · JPL
567817	2002 QB_{160}	—	August 16, 2002	Kitt Peak	Spacewatch	PHO	850 m	MPC · JPL
567818	2002 RP_{71}	—	August 29, 2002	Palomar	NEAT	·	2.4 km	MPC · JPL
567819	2002 RU_{78}	—	September 5, 2002	Socorro	LINEAR	·	670 m	MPC · JPL
567820	2002 RY_{127}	—	September 3, 2002	Palomar	NEAT	·	3.5 km	MPC · JPL
567821	2002 RF_{131}	—	September 4, 2002	Palomar	NEAT	·	2.7 km	MPC · JPL
567822	2002 RQ_{137}	—	September 11, 2002	Palomar	NEAT	JUN	730 m	MPC · JPL
567823	2002 RZ_{143}	—	September 11, 2002	Palomar	NEAT	·	550 m	MPC · JPL
567824	2002 RA_{166}	—	September 13, 2002	Palomar	NEAT	·	680 m	MPC · JPL
567825	2002 RQ_{169}	—	September 13, 2002	Palomar	NEAT	·	560 m	MPC · JPL
567826	2002 RQ_{195}	—	September 12, 2002	Palomar	NEAT	·	610 m	MPC · JPL
567827	2002 RC_{225}	—	September 13, 2002	Palomar	NEAT	·	1.1 km	MPC · JPL
567828	2002 RJ_{231}	—	September 14, 2002	Palomar	NEAT	EUN	1.0 km	MPC · JPL
567829	2002 RY_{239}	—	August 17, 2002	Palomar	NEAT	·	670 m	MPC · JPL
567830	2002 RJ_{243}	—	September 13, 2002	Palomar	NEAT	·	900 m	MPC · JPL
567831	2002 RW_{245}	—	September 4, 2002	Palomar	NEAT	·	2.1 km	MPC · JPL
567832	2002 RC_{250}	—	September 15, 2002	Palomar	NEAT	·	1.9 km	MPC · JPL
567833	2002 RP_{262}	—	December 1, 2003	Kitt Peak	Spacewatch	·	2.5 km	MPC · JPL
567834	2002 RD_{275}	—	September 4, 2002	Palomar	NEAT	AGN	1.1 km	MPC · JPL
567835	2002 RY_{277}	—	October 11, 2002	Apache Point	SDSS Collaboration	·	560 m	MPC · JPL
567836	2002 RW_{281}	—	September 15, 2006	Kitt Peak	Spacewatch	·	1.6 km	MPC · JPL
567837	2002 RD_{282}	—	October 9, 2008	Mount Lemmon	Mount Lemmon Survey	·	2.1 km	MPC · JPL
567838	2002 RT_{287}	—	September 11, 2007	Mount Lemmon	Mount Lemmon Survey	KOR	1.2 km	MPC · JPL
567839	2002 RY_{288}	—	September 13, 2007	Mount Lemmon	Mount Lemmon Survey	·	1.5 km	MPC · JPL
567840	2002 RL_{289}	—	March 4, 2010	Kitt Peak	Spacewatch	·	2.2 km	MPC · JPL
567841	2002 RK_{290}	—	October 7, 2007	Catalina	CSS	·	2.6 km	MPC · JPL
567842	2002 RK_{291}	—	September 11, 2007	XuYi	PMO NEO Survey Program	BRA	1.3 km	MPC · JPL
567843	2002 RS_{293}	—	February 23, 2012	Catalina	CSS	H	510 m	MPC · JPL
567844	2002 RW_{295}	—	May 17, 2012	Mount Lemmon	Mount Lemmon Survey	·	920 m	MPC · JPL
567845	2002 RG_{296}	—	March 1, 2008	Mount Lemmon	Mount Lemmon Survey	PHO	1.2 km	MPC · JPL
567846	2002 RM_{297}	—	September 28, 2006	Catalina	CSS	·	1.5 km	MPC · JPL
567847	2002 RR_{297}	—	September 15, 2012	Catalina	CSS	·	2.7 km	MPC · JPL
567848	2002 RY_{297}	—	January 24, 2015	Mount Lemmon	Mount Lemmon Survey	KOR	1.5 km	MPC · JPL
567849	2002 RA_{298}	—	January 6, 2010	Kitt Peak	Spacewatch	·	600 m	MPC · JPL
567850	2002 RD_{298}	—	October 25, 2016	Haleakala	Pan-STARRS 1	·	1.4 km	MPC · JPL
567851	2002 RG_{298}	—	November 20, 2008	Kitt Peak	Spacewatch	·	2.2 km	MPC · JPL
567852	2002 RC_{299}	—	November 20, 2009	Kitt Peak	Spacewatch	·	900 m	MPC · JPL
567853	2002 RF_{300}	—	October 8, 2012	Mount Lemmon	Mount Lemmon Survey	·	1.3 km	MPC · JPL
567854	2002 SP_{4}	—	September 27, 2002	Palomar	NEAT	·	1.3 km	MPC · JPL
567855	2002 SD_{68}	—	October 11, 2002	Apache Point	SDSS	·	630 m	MPC · JPL
567856	2002 TN_{35}	—	October 2, 2002	Socorro	LINEAR	·	700 m	MPC · JPL
567857	2002 TV_{62}	—	October 3, 2002	Campo Imperatore	CINEOS	·	730 m	MPC · JPL
567858	2002 TG_{69}	—	October 4, 2002	Socorro	LINEAR	H	430 m	MPC · JPL
567859	2002 TX_{97}	—	October 3, 2002	Palomar	NEAT	PHO	970 m	MPC · JPL
567860	2002 TO_{123}	—	October 4, 2002	Palomar	NEAT	·	1.4 km	MPC · JPL
567861	2002 TX_{163}	—	October 5, 2002	Palomar	NEAT	BRA	1.6 km	MPC · JPL
567862	2002 TZ_{218}	—	October 5, 2002	Socorro	LINEAR	·	2.8 km	MPC · JPL
567863	2002 TB_{234}	—	October 6, 2002	Socorro	LINEAR	·	2.2 km	MPC · JPL
567864	2002 TV_{378}	—	October 5, 2002	Palomar	NEAT	EOS	1.4 km	MPC · JPL
567865	2002 TN_{379}	—	October 5, 2002	Palomar	NEAT	·	700 m	MPC · JPL
567866	2002 TC_{384}	—	October 15, 2002	Palomar	NEAT	·	1.9 km	MPC · JPL
567867	2002 TL_{386}	—	October 6, 2002	Palomar	NEAT	·	1.4 km	MPC · JPL
567868	2002 TO_{388}	—	February 6, 2014	Mount Lemmon	Mount Lemmon Survey	TIN	1.2 km	MPC · JPL
567869	2002 TC_{389}	—	January 16, 2004	Palomar	NEAT	PHO	1.4 km	MPC · JPL
567870	2002 TU_{389}	—	September 24, 2007	Kitt Peak	Spacewatch	KOR	1.2 km	MPC · JPL
567871	2002 TE_{390}	—	October 14, 1998	Caussols	ODAS	·	1.0 km	MPC · JPL
567872	2002 TM_{390}	—	September 8, 2015	Haleakala	Pan-STARRS 1	·	660 m	MPC · JPL
567873	2002 TU_{391}	—	August 13, 2012	Haleakala	Pan-STARRS 1	·	1.6 km	MPC · JPL
567874	2002 TD_{392}	—	November 26, 2012	Mount Lemmon	Mount Lemmon Survey	·	560 m	MPC · JPL
567875	2002 TK_{394}	—	September 10, 2007	Mount Lemmon	Mount Lemmon Survey	·	1.6 km	MPC · JPL
567876	2002 UD_{27}	—	October 31, 2002	Anderson Mesa	LONEOS	·	670 m	MPC · JPL
567877	2002 UO_{30}	—	October 30, 2002	Kitt Peak	Spacewatch	MAS	630 m	MPC · JPL
567878	2002 UL_{49}	—	October 31, 2002	Socorro	LINEAR	·	2.2 km	MPC · JPL
567879	2002 UF_{71}	—	January 27, 2015	Haleakala	Pan-STARRS 1	·	1.9 km	MPC · JPL
567880	2002 UY_{71}	—	November 14, 2002	Kitt Peak	Spacewatch	EOS	1.7 km	MPC · JPL
567881	2002 UO_{77}	—	November 7, 2002	Anderson Mesa	LONEOS	·	730 m	MPC · JPL
567882	2002 UN_{80}	—	April 29, 2014	Haleakala	Pan-STARRS 1	·	570 m	MPC · JPL
567883	2002 UP_{80}	—	April 13, 2008	Mount Lemmon	Mount Lemmon Survey	·	1.3 km	MPC · JPL
567884	2002 UN_{81}	—	December 20, 2009	Mount Lemmon	Mount Lemmon Survey	·	660 m	MPC · JPL
567885	2002 UW_{81}	—	October 7, 2013	Kitt Peak	Spacewatch	·	2.2 km	MPC · JPL
567886	2002 UY_{81}	—	September 13, 2007	Catalina	CSS	·	2.2 km	MPC · JPL
567887	2002 VF_{5}	—	November 5, 2002	Wrightwood	J. W. Young	KOR	1.3 km	MPC · JPL
567888	2002 VK_{41}	—	November 4, 2002	Palomar	NEAT	·	1.0 km	MPC · JPL
567889	2002 VC_{91}	—	November 4, 2002	Kitt Peak	Spacewatch	L5	10 km	MPC · JPL
567890	2002 VD_{91}	—	November 11, 2002	Kitt Peak	Spacewatch	·	560 m	MPC · JPL
567891	2002 VQ_{98}	—	November 13, 2002	Kitt Peak	Spacewatch	·	2.5 km	MPC · JPL
567892	2002 VA_{149}	—	November 1, 2002	Palomar	NEAT	·	1.6 km	MPC · JPL
567893	2002 VV_{150}	—	May 27, 2012	Mount Lemmon	Mount Lemmon Survey	·	680 m	MPC · JPL
567894	2002 VB_{151}	—	December 10, 2009	Mount Lemmon	Mount Lemmon Survey	·	580 m	MPC · JPL
567895	2002 VT_{151}	—	April 30, 2006	Kitt Peak	Spacewatch	SYL	3.4 km	MPC · JPL
567896	2002 VU_{152}	—	October 11, 2007	Mount Lemmon	Mount Lemmon Survey	·	1.2 km	MPC · JPL
567897	2002 VH_{153}	—	March 12, 2014	Kitt Peak	Spacewatch	·	570 m	MPC · JPL
567898	2002 VM_{153}	—	November 1, 2002	La Palma	A. Fitzsimmons	KOR	1.0 km	MPC · JPL
567899	2002 WG_{21}	—	November 23, 2002	Palomar	NEAT	·	1.2 km	MPC · JPL
567900	2002 XV_{8}	—	November 24, 2002	Palomar	NEAT	H	530 m	MPC · JPL

== 567901–568000 ==
back to top

Designation			Discovery			Properties		Ref
Permanent	Provisional	Named after	Date	Site	Discoverer(s)	Category	Diam.	Ref
567901	2002 XN_{93}	—	November 2, 2015	Haleakala	Pan-STARRS 1	·	600 m	MPC · JPL
567902	2002 XT_{118}	—	December 3, 2002	Palomar	NEAT	PHO	780 m	MPC · JPL
567903	2002 XJ_{120}	—	December 3, 2002	Palomar	NEAT	·	1.9 km	MPC · JPL
567904	2002 XE_{122}	—	April 18, 2015	Haleakala	Pan-STARRS 1	EOS	1.4 km	MPC · JPL
567905	2002 XN_{123}	—	November 9, 2007	Kitt Peak	Spacewatch	·	1.4 km	MPC · JPL
567906	2002 XS_{124}	—	October 5, 2013	Haleakala	Pan-STARRS 1	L5	7.0 km	MPC · JPL
567907	2002 YM_{24}	—	December 31, 2002	Socorro	LINEAR	·	2.1 km	MPC · JPL
567908	2003 AA_{42}	—	December 5, 2002	Haleakala	NEAT	·	4.3 km	MPC · JPL
567909	2003 AM_{71}	—	January 10, 2003	Kitt Peak	Spacewatch	·	2.1 km	MPC · JPL
567910	2003 AL_{91}	—	January 5, 2003	Socorro	LINEAR	·	2.3 km	MPC · JPL
567911	2003 BU_{8}	—	January 26, 2003	Anderson Mesa	LONEOS	THB	2.4 km	MPC · JPL
567912	2003 BY_{32}	—	January 10, 2003	Kitt Peak	Spacewatch	·	2.7 km	MPC · JPL
567913	2003 BY_{69}	—	January 30, 2003	Kitt Peak	Spacewatch	·	900 m	MPC · JPL
567914	2003 BX_{73}	—	January 29, 2003	Palomar	NEAT	·	3.7 km	MPC · JPL
567915	2003 BZ_{73}	—	January 24, 2003	Palomar	NEAT	EOS	2.5 km	MPC · JPL
567916	2003 BL_{93}	—	January 29, 2003	Palomar	NEAT	EOS	1.7 km	MPC · JPL
567917	2003 BD_{94}	—	January 24, 2003	Palomar	NEAT	·	3.3 km	MPC · JPL
567918	2003 BD_{95}	—	May 6, 2014	Haleakala	Pan-STARRS 1	·	2.4 km	MPC · JPL
567919	2003 BE_{95}	—	December 13, 2012	Mount Lemmon	Mount Lemmon Survey	·	1.7 km	MPC · JPL
567920	2003 BJ_{95}	—	February 26, 2014	Haleakala	Pan-STARRS 1	·	1.9 km	MPC · JPL
567921	2003 BL_{95}	—	April 23, 2015	Haleakala	Pan-STARRS 1	EOS	1.6 km	MPC · JPL
567922	2003 BJ_{96}	—	October 21, 2008	Kitt Peak	Spacewatch	·	650 m	MPC · JPL
567923	2003 BN_{96}	—	March 4, 2016	Haleakala	Pan-STARRS 1	KON	2.0 km	MPC · JPL
567924	2003 BW_{96}	—	October 26, 2008	Kitt Peak	Spacewatch	·	640 m	MPC · JPL
567925	2003 BW_{97}	—	March 7, 2014	Mount Lemmon	Mount Lemmon Survey	·	1.5 km	MPC · JPL
567926	2003 BC_{98}	—	May 21, 2015	Haleakala	Pan-STARRS 1	EOS	1.6 km	MPC · JPL
567927	2003 BP_{98}	—	November 8, 2010	Kitt Peak	Spacewatch	·	900 m	MPC · JPL
567928	2003 BS_{99}	—	December 6, 2010	Mount Lemmon	Mount Lemmon Survey	·	820 m	MPC · JPL
567929	2003 BR_{100}	—	May 23, 2012	Mount Lemmon	Mount Lemmon Survey	·	1.2 km	MPC · JPL
567930	2003 BU_{100}	—	February 12, 2008	Mount Lemmon	Mount Lemmon Survey	·	3.1 km	MPC · JPL
567931	2003 BB_{101}	—	February 2, 2008	Mount Lemmon	Mount Lemmon Survey	·	1.9 km	MPC · JPL
567932	2003 BA_{102}	—	February 3, 2008	Mount Lemmon	Mount Lemmon Survey	·	2.2 km	MPC · JPL
567933	2003 BG_{102}	—	February 6, 2016	Haleakala	Pan-STARRS 1	·	1.6 km	MPC · JPL
567934	2003 BM_{102}	—	September 4, 2011	Kitt Peak	Spacewatch	EOS	1.5 km	MPC · JPL
567935	2003 BU_{102}	—	December 23, 2014	Mount Lemmon	Mount Lemmon Survey	MAR	850 m	MPC · JPL
567936	2003 CL	—	January 27, 2003	Socorro	LINEAR	THB	2.5 km	MPC · JPL
567937	2003 CE_{20}	—	February 9, 2003	La Silla	Michelsen, R., G. Masi	TIR	1.8 km	MPC · JPL
567938	2003 CJ_{24}	—	February 4, 2003	La Silla	Barbieri, C.	EOS	1.6 km	MPC · JPL
567939	2003 CT_{26}	—	June 14, 2004	Kitt Peak	Spacewatch	·	660 m	MPC · JPL
567940	2003 CU_{26}	—	September 29, 2008	Mount Lemmon	Mount Lemmon Survey	·	790 m	MPC · JPL
567941	2003 CJ_{27}	—	September 22, 2012	Kitt Peak	Spacewatch	·	2.1 km	MPC · JPL
567942	2003 CF_{28}	—	November 18, 2007	Mount Lemmon	Mount Lemmon Survey	·	1.5 km	MPC · JPL
567943	2003 CN_{28}	—	February 1, 2003	Palomar	NEAT	·	2.1 km	MPC · JPL
567944	2003 DH	—	February 12, 2003	Haleakala	NEAT	TIR	3.1 km	MPC · JPL
567945	2003 DZ	—	January 27, 2003	Socorro	LINEAR	·	2.2 km	MPC · JPL
567946	2003 DV_{18}	—	January 30, 2003	Haleakala	NEAT	·	1.7 km	MPC · JPL
567947	2003 DF_{25}	—	November 16, 2012	Charleston	R. Holmes	·	2.3 km	MPC · JPL
567948	2003 ET_{34}	—	March 7, 2003	Socorro	LINEAR	T_{j} (2.97)	2.5 km	MPC · JPL
567949	2003 EN_{37}	—	March 9, 2003	Palomar	NEAT	·	1.8 km	MPC · JPL
567950	2003 EO_{41}	—	March 9, 2003	Palomar	NEAT	·	1.6 km	MPC · JPL
567951	2003 EA_{56}	—	March 11, 2003	Kitt Peak	Spacewatch	·	1.1 km	MPC · JPL
567952	2003 EG_{64}	—	December 13, 2010	Mauna Kea	M. Micheli, L. Wells	·	1.4 km	MPC · JPL
567953	2003 EH_{64}	—	August 6, 2004	Palomar	NEAT	·	1.4 km	MPC · JPL
567954	2003 EK_{64}	—	September 4, 2011	Haleakala	Pan-STARRS 1	·	2.6 km	MPC · JPL
567955	2003 EP_{64}	—	December 3, 2010	Kitt Peak	Spacewatch	HNS	1.1 km	MPC · JPL
567956	2003 EW_{64}	—	August 9, 2016	Haleakala	Pan-STARRS 1	·	2.3 km	MPC · JPL
567957	2003 FK_{14}	—	March 23, 2003	Kitt Peak	Spacewatch	·	2.8 km	MPC · JPL
567958	2003 FB_{17}	—	March 24, 2003	Kitt Peak	Spacewatch	·	720 m	MPC · JPL
567959	2003 FO_{21}	—	March 26, 2003	Socorro	LINEAR	JUN	1.1 km	MPC · JPL
567960	2003 FZ_{50}	—	March 11, 2003	Palomar	NEAT	·	3.1 km	MPC · JPL
567961	2003 FE_{64}	—	March 26, 2003	Palomar	NEAT	·	1.6 km	MPC · JPL
567962	2003 FC_{66}	—	March 11, 2003	Kitt Peak	Spacewatch	·	1.2 km	MPC · JPL
567963	2003 FG_{70}	—	March 26, 2003	Palomar	NEAT	·	990 m	MPC · JPL
567964	2003 FW_{107}	—	March 31, 2003	Anderson Mesa	LONEOS	·	1.7 km	MPC · JPL
567965	2003 FJ_{124}	—	March 31, 2003	Kitt Peak	Spacewatch	·	2.0 km	MPC · JPL
567966	2003 FU_{124}	—	March 30, 2003	Kitt Peak	Deep Ecliptic Survey	·	2.0 km	MPC · JPL
567967	2003 FM_{125}	—	March 30, 2003	Kitt Peak	Deep Ecliptic Survey	NYS	730 m	MPC · JPL
567968	2003 FC_{126}	—	March 30, 2003	Kitt Peak	Deep Ecliptic Survey	·	1.2 km	MPC · JPL
567969	2003 FY_{132}	—	March 23, 2003	Kitt Peak	Spacewatch	LIX	2.7 km	MPC · JPL
567970	2003 FJ_{133}	—	March 27, 2003	Palomar	NEAT	·	3.1 km	MPC · JPL
567971	2003 FH_{134}	—	August 31, 2011	Haleakala	Pan-STARRS 1	·	2.6 km	MPC · JPL
567972	2003 FP_{134}	—	September 4, 2011	Haleakala	Pan-STARRS 1	·	970 m	MPC · JPL
567973	2003 FT_{134}	—	February 19, 2010	Mount Lemmon	Mount Lemmon Survey	·	660 m	MPC · JPL
567974	2003 FZ_{134}	—	March 26, 2003	Kitt Peak	Spacewatch	·	1.6 km	MPC · JPL
567975	2003 FC_{135}	—	August 27, 2014	Haleakala	Pan-STARRS 1	JUN	760 m	MPC · JPL
567976	2003 FL_{135}	—	November 29, 2014	Mount Lemmon	Mount Lemmon Survey	·	1.0 km	MPC · JPL
567977	2003 FM_{135}	—	May 3, 2014	Mount Lemmon	Mount Lemmon Survey	·	2.1 km	MPC · JPL
567978	2003 FX_{135}	—	January 11, 2008	Kitt Peak	Spacewatch	·	1.9 km	MPC · JPL
567979	2003 FN_{136}	—	March 31, 2003	Kitt Peak	Spacewatch	·	1.5 km	MPC · JPL
567980	2003 FU_{136}	—	March 26, 2003	Palomar	NEAT	·	510 m	MPC · JPL
567981	2003 FV_{136}	—	October 22, 2005	Kitt Peak	Spacewatch	·	2.9 km	MPC · JPL
567982	2003 FT_{137}	—	December 16, 2007	Mount Lemmon	Mount Lemmon Survey	·	2.7 km	MPC · JPL
567983	2003 FA_{138}	—	July 30, 2008	Kitt Peak	Spacewatch	·	710 m	MPC · JPL
567984	2003 FB_{138}	—	October 27, 2006	Mount Lemmon	Mount Lemmon Survey	·	2.3 km	MPC · JPL
567985	2003 FE_{138}	—	December 4, 2007	Mount Lemmon	Mount Lemmon Survey	·	2.6 km	MPC · JPL
567986	2003 FP_{138}	—	October 21, 2006	Kitt Peak	Spacewatch	·	2.5 km	MPC · JPL
567987	2003 FQ_{138}	—	March 13, 2011	Mount Lemmon	Mount Lemmon Survey	·	1.2 km	MPC · JPL
567988	2003 FO_{139}	—	May 22, 2015	Haleakala	Pan-STARRS 1	·	2.7 km	MPC · JPL
567989	2003 FW_{139}	—	March 23, 2003	Kitt Peak	Spacewatch	EOS	1.6 km	MPC · JPL
567990	2003 FC_{140}	—	January 11, 2008	Kitt Peak	Spacewatch	·	1.9 km	MPC · JPL
567991	2003 FQ_{141}	—	January 10, 2007	Mount Lemmon	Mount Lemmon Survey	·	2.4 km	MPC · JPL
567992	2003 GV_{13}	—	April 4, 2003	Kitt Peak	Spacewatch	·	710 m	MPC · JPL
567993	2003 GQ_{18}	—	April 4, 2003	Kitt Peak	Spacewatch	·	3.0 km	MPC · JPL
567994	2003 GG_{28}	—	April 7, 2003	Kitt Peak	Spacewatch	·	2.3 km	MPC · JPL
567995	2003 GU_{51}	—	April 5, 2003	Kitt Peak	Spacewatch	·	1.6 km	MPC · JPL
567996	2003 GY_{57}	—	January 30, 2008	Mount Lemmon	Mount Lemmon Survey	·	2.8 km	MPC · JPL
567997	2003 GB_{58}	—	January 31, 2006	Kitt Peak	Spacewatch	·	580 m	MPC · JPL
567998	2003 GD_{58}	—	September 8, 2011	Kitt Peak	Spacewatch	·	3.1 km	MPC · JPL
567999	2003 GE_{58}	—	December 31, 2007	Kitt Peak	Spacewatch	·	2.4 km	MPC · JPL
568000	2003 GK_{58}	—	April 5, 2003	Kitt Peak	Spacewatch	·	660 m	MPC · JPL

back to top

== Meaning of names ==
As minor planet discoveries are confirmed, they are given a permanent number by the IAU's Minor Planet Center (MPC), and the discoverers can then submit names for them, following the IAU's naming conventions. The list below concerns those minor planets in the specified number-range that have received names, and explains the meanings of those names.

Official naming citations of newly named small Solar System bodies are approved and published in a bulletin by IAU's Working Group for Small Bodies Nomenclature (WGSBN). Before May 2021, citations were published in MPC's Minor Planet Circulars for many decades. Recent citations can also be found on the JPL Small-Body Database (SBDB). Until his death in 2016, German astronomer Lutz D. Schmadel compiled these citations into the Dictionary of Minor Planet Names (DMP) and regularly updated the collection.

Based on Paul Herget's The Names of the Minor Planets, Schmadel also researched the unclear origin of numerous asteroids, most of which had been named prior to World War II. This article incorporates text from this source, which is in the public domain: SBDB New namings may only be added to this list below after official publication as the preannouncement of names is condemned. The WGSBN publishes a comprehensive guideline for the naming rules of non-cometary small Solar System bodies.

Named minor planet	Provisional	This minor planet was named for...	Ref · Catalog
567010 Kanyósándor	2018 VS_{104}	Sándor Kanyó (1932–2016), a Hungarian physicist, astronomer and university lecturer.	IAU · 567010
567329 Zinaida	2001 BY_{84}	Zinaida Voronina (1947–2001), artistic gymnast who won gold, silver and bronze medals at the 1968 Mexico City Olympics.	JPL · 567329
567490 Bánkyvilma	2001 UW_{232}	Vilma Bánky (1901–1991), a Hungarian-American silent film actress.	IAU · 567490
567580 Latuni	2002 AN_{214}	For more than 100 years, the University of Latvia has been the most popular university in Latvia. Dozens of astronomers and tens of thousands of young people in other fields are grateful to the university for the knowledge.	IAU · 567580
