= William Cameron Menzies =

American filmmaker and designer (1896–1957)

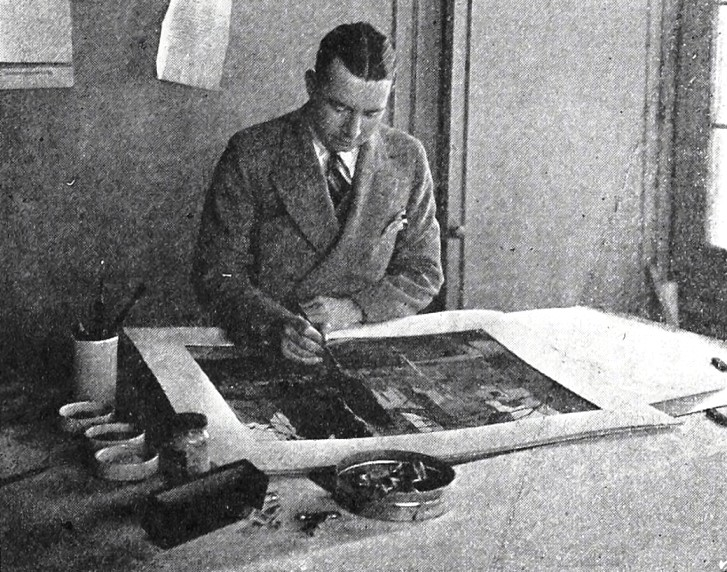
- Menzies in 1925
- Born: July 29, 1896; New Haven, Connecticut, U.S.
- Died: March 5, 1957 (aged 60); Los Angeles, California, U.S.
- Education: Yale University, University of Edinburgh
- Occupations: Production designer, film director
- Years active: 1917–1956
- Awards: Academy Award for Best Art Direction; 1928 The Dove; Tempest; Academy Honorary Award; 1939 Gone with the Wind

William Cameron Menzies (July 29, 1896 – March 5, 1957) was an American filmmaker who pioneered the discipline of production design, a job title he invented. His career spanned five decades, during which time he also worked as an art director, director, producer, and special effects artist. He began his career during the silent era, and later pioneered the use of color in film for dramatic effect.

Over the course of his career, Menzies was nominated for six Academy Awards and won two - one for Best Art Direction, and an Honorary Oscar for his work on Gone with the Wind. He is considered one of the most influential figures of the Golden Age of Hollywood, described by Martin Scorsese as a “genius, [whose] influence was incalculable.”

== Early years ==
Menzies was born in New Haven, Connecticut, to Scottish immigrant parents, Charles A. and Helen originally from Aberfeldy, Perth and Kinross. He studied at Yale and the University of Edinburgh and, after serving in the United States Army during World War I, he attended the Art Students League of New York.

== Career ==
Menzies joined Famous Players–Lasky, later to evolve into Paramount Pictures, working in special effects and design. He soon worked on such films as Robin Hood (1922), The Thief of Bagdad (1924), The Bat (1926), The Dove (1927), Sadie Thompson (1928), and Tempest (1928). His contributions to The Dove (1927), as well as Tempest (1928) led to Menzies receiving the first Academy Award for Best Production Design, an accolade for achievement in art direction. In 1929, Menzies formed a partnership with producer Joseph M. Schenck to create a series of early sound short films visualizing great works of music, including a 10-minute version of Dukas's The Sorcerer's Apprentice, and created the production design and special effects for Schenck's feature film The Lottery Bride (1930).

Menzies's work on The Adventures of Tom Sawyer (1938) prompted David O. Selznick to hire him for Gone with the Wind (1939). Selznick's faith in Menzies was so great that he sent a memorandum to everyone at Selznick International Pictures who was involved in the production reminding them that "Menzies is the final word" on everything related to Technicolor, scenic design, set decoration, and the overall look of the production. His work on the film also earned Menzies an Honorary Academy Award "for outstanding achievement in the use of color for the enhancement of dramatic mood."

"Production designer" (which is sometimes used interchangeably with "art director") was coined specifically for Menzies, to refer to his being the final word on the overall look of the production; it was intended to describe his ability to translate Selznick's ideas to drawings and paintings from which he and his fellow directors worked.

Menzies was the director of the burning of Atlanta sequence in Gone with the Wind. He also re-shot the Salvador Dalí dream sequence of Alfred Hitchcock's Spellbound (1945).

In addition, Menzies directed dramas and fantasy films. He made two science-fiction films: Things to Come (1936), based on a novel by H.G. Wells, for producer Alexander Korda which predicted war and technical advancement; and Invaders from Mars (1953), which mirrored many fears about aliens and outside threats to humanity in the 1950s.

== Death ==
Shortly after completing his work as an associate producer on Around the World in 80 Days (1956), Menzies died of cancer. He was interred in the Forest Lawn Memorial Park Cemetery in Glendale, California.

== Accolades ==
At the first Academy Awards, held on May 16, 1929, Menzies won for Best Art Direction for The Dove and Tempest. He was the first to win the Academy Award for art direction. The following year he was nominated in the same categories for his work on Bulldog Drummond, Alibi, and The Awakening, but lost to Cedric Gibbons.

At the 12th Academy Awards held on February 29, 1940, Menzies won an Academy Honorary Award "for outstanding achievement in the use of color for the enhancement of dramatic mood" in the production of Gone With the Wind.

== Legacy ==
In 2005, Menzies was in the first group of art directors and production designers inducted into the Art Directors Guild Hall of Fame.

Several of Menzies home movies are part of the collection of the Academy Film Archive and were preserved by the archive in 2015.

== Filmography ==
=== Silent Films, 1918-1930 ===
Year	Title	Studio	Director	Photography	Notes
1917	The Mark of Cain	Astra Film/Pathé	George Fitzmaurice	Arthur C. Miller	Menzies assistant to "Settings" director Anton Grot
1918	The Naulahka	Astra Film/Pathé	George Fitzmaurice	Arthur C. Miller	Menzies set associate to Anton Grot
1918	Innocent	Astra Film Corp/Pathé	George Fitzmaurice	Percy Hilburn	With Anton Grot; Menzies joined the U.S. Navy before the film's completion.
1919	The Test of Honor	Famous Players–Lasky/Paramount Pictures	John S. Robertson	Jacques Monteran	Menzies reports this "a movie I have staged" (uncredited)
1919	Redhead	Select Pictures Corp./Select Film Corp.	Charles Maigne	Al Liguori	Menzies reports this "a movie I have staged." (uncredited)
1919	Come Out of the Kitchen	Famous Players–Lasky/Paramount Pictures	John S. Robertson	Jacques Monteran	Menzies reports this "a movie I have staged." (uncredited)
1919	The Avalanche	Famous Players–Lasky/Artcraft Pictures	George Fitzmaurice	Arthur C. Miller	Fitzmaurice is credited with set design. Menzies' reports "staging" the picture. (uncredited)
1919	The Firing Line	Famous Players–Lasky/Paramount Pictures-Artcraft	George Fitzmaurice	Al Liguori	Menzies reports this "a movie I have staged." (uncredited)
1919	His Wedding Night	Select Pictures Corp./Select Pictures Corp.	George Fitzmaurice	Jacques Monteran	Menzies reports this "a movie I have staged." (uncredited)
1919	A Society Exile	Famous Players–Lasky/Artcraft Pictures	George Fitzmaurice	Arthur C. Miller	Menzies reports this "a movie I have staged." (uncredited)
1919	The Misleading Widow	Famous Players–Lasky/Paramount Pictures-Artcraft	John S. Robertson	Roy Overbaugh	Menzies reports this "a movie I have staged." (uncredited)
1919	The Witness for the Defense	Famous Players–Lasky/Paramount Pictures-Artcraft	George Fitzmaurice	Hal Young	Menzies credited for "Settings"
1919	The Teeth of the Tiger	Famous Players–Lasky/Paramount Pictures-Artcraft	Chet Withey	Al Liguori	Menzies credited for "Settings"
1919	His Wife's Friend	Thomas H. Ince/Paramount Pictures-Artcraft	Joseph De Grasse	John S. Stumar	Menzies reports this "a movie I have staged [art direction]." (uncredited)
1920	Sinners	Realart Pictures Inc./Realart Pictures Inc.	Kenneth Webb	George Folsey	Menzies reports this "a movie I have staged [art direction]." (uncredited)
1920	Dr. Jekyll and Mr. Hyde	Famous Players–Lasky/Paramount Pictures-Artcraft	John S. Robertson	Roy Overbaugh	Menzies provided a draft summary for the film.(uncredited)
1920	The Deep Purple	Mayflower Photoplay Company/Realart Pictures Inc.	Raoul Walsh	Jacques Bizeul	Menzies credited for "Settings"
1921	Scrambled Wives	Margaret Clark Productions/First National Pictures	Edward H. Griffith	William McCoy, Ray June	Menzies reports this "a movie I have staged [art direction]." (uncredited)
1921	The Oath	Mayflower Photoplay Corp/Associated First National	Raoul Walsh	Dal Clawson	Menzies credited for "Settings"
1921	Serenade	R.A.Walsh Productions/Associated First National	Raoul Walsh	George Peters	Menzies credited for "Settings"
1922	Kindred of the Dust	R.A.Walsh Productions/Associated First National	Raoul Walsh	Charles Van Enger, H. Lyman Broening	Menzies credited for "Settings"
1923	Rosita	Mary Pickford Company/United Artists	Ernst Lubitsch	Charles Rosher	Menzies credited as "Art Director"
1924	The Thief of Bagdad	Douglas Fairbanks| Pictures/United Artists	Raoul Walsh	Arthur Edeson	Menzies credited as "Art Director"
1924	The Only Woman	Joseph M. Schenck Productions/First National Pictures	Sidney Olcott	Antonio Gaudio	Menzies credited for "Settings"
1924	Her Night of Romance	Norma Talmadge Production Corporation/First National Pictures	Sidney Franklin	Ray Binger, Victor Milner	Menzies credited for "Art Direction"
1925	The Lady	Joseph M. Schenck Productions/First National Pictures	Frank Borzage	Antonio Gaudio	Menzies credited for "Settings"
1925	Learning to Love	Norma Talmadge Production Corporation/First National Pictures	Sidney Franklin	Victor Milner	Menzies credited for "Settings"
1925	Her Sister from Paris	Norma Talmadge Production Corporation/First National Pictures	Sidney Franklin	Arthur Edeson	Menzies credited as "Art Director"
1925	Graustark	Joseph M. Schenck Productions/First National Pictures	Dimitri Buchowetzki	Gaetana Gaudio	Menzies credited for "Settings"
1925	The Dark Angel	Samuel Goldwyn Productions/First National Pictures	George Fitzmaurice	George Barnes	Menzies credited for "Settings"
1925	The Eagle	Art Finance Corporation/United Artists	Clarence Brown	George Barnes	Menzies credited for "Settings"
1925	Cobra	Ritz-Carlton Pictures/Paramount Pictures	Joseph Henabery	George Barnes	Menzies credited for "Settings"
1926	The Wanderer	Famous Players–Lasky/Paramount Pictures	Raoul Walsh	Victor Milner	Menzies credited for "Settings"
1926	The Bat	Famous Players–Lasky/Paramount Pictures	Roland West	Arthur Edeson	Menzies credited for "Settings"
1926	Kiki	Joseph M. Schenck Productions/First National	Clarence Brown	Oliver Marsh	Menzies credited for "Settings"
1926	The Son of the Sheik	Feature Productions/United Artists	George Fitzmaurice	George Barnes	Menzies credited for "Settings"
1926	Fig Leaves	20th Century Fox	Howard Hawks	Joseph August	Menzies and William S. Darling credited for "Settings" Menzie's contribution was only to the Garden of Eden sequence at opening of the picture.
1926	The Duchess of Buffalo	Talmadge Production Corporation/First National Pictures	Sydney Franklin	Oliver Marsh	Menzies credited as "Art Director"
1927	The Beloved Rogue	Feature Productions/United Artists	Alan Crosland	Joseph August	Menzies credited as "Art Director"
1927	Venus of Venice	Talmadge Production Corporation/First National Pictures	Marshall Neilan	George Barnes	Menzies credited as "Art Director"
1927	Camille	Joseph M. SchenckProductions/First National Pictures	Fred Niblo	Oliver Marsh	Menzies credited as "Art Director"
1927	Topsy and Eva	Feature Productions/United Artists	Del Lord, D. W. Griffith (uncredited)	John W. Boyle	Menzies credited as "Art Director"
1927	Two Arabian Knights	The Caddo Company/United Artists	Lewis Milestone	Antonio Guidio, Joseph August (uncredited)	Menzies credited as "Art Director"
1927	Sorrell and Son	Joseph M. Schenck Productions/First National Pictures	Herbert Brenon	James Wong Howe	Menzies credited as "Art Director"
1927	Quality Street	Joseph M. Schenck Productions/First National Pictures	Sydney Franklin	Hendrik Sartov	Menzies uncredited, but designed the film's Green Willow Village on the M-G-M lot.
1927	The Dove	Joseph M. Schenck Productions/First National	Roland West	Oliver Marsh	Menzies credited for "Settings"
1928	Sadie Thompson	Gloria Swanson Productions, Inc./United Artists	Raoul Walsh	Oliver Marsh	Menzies credited as "Art Director"
1928	What Price Beauty?	S. George Ulman Productions/Pathe	Tom Buckingham	J.D. Jennings	Menzies credited as "Art Director"
1928	Drums of Love	Feature Productions/United Artists	D. W. Griffith	Karl Struss, G.W. Bitzer	Menzies credited for "Settings"
1928	"The Garden of Eden	Feature Productions/United Artists	Lewis Milestone	John Arnold (Technicolor sequence)	Menzies credited as "Art Director"
1928	The Love of Zero	Florey-Menzies Productions/(first Los Angeles showing)	Robert Florey	Edward Fitzgerald	Menzies credited with "Staging"
1928	Drums of Love	Feature Productions/United Artists	John W. Considine Jr.	Charles Rosher	Menzies credited as "Art Director"
1928	The Woman Disputed	Joseph M. Schenck Productions/United Artists	Henry King, Sam Taylor	Oliver Marsh	Menzies credited as "Art Director"
1928	The Battle of the Sexes	Art Cinema Corporation/United Artists	D. W. Griffith	Karl Struss, G.W. Bitzer	Menzies credited for "Settings"
1928	Revenge	Edwin Carewe Productions/United Artists	Edwin Carewe	Albert Kurrie, Alfred E. Green	Menzies credited as "Art Director"
1928	The Awakening	Samuel Goldwyn Productions/United Artists	Victor Fleming	George Barnes	Menzies credited as "Art Director""
1929	The Rescue	Samuel Goldwyn Productions/United Artists	Herbert Brenon	George Barnes, Joseph F. Biroc	Menzies credited as "Art Director""
1929	Lady of the Pavements	Art Cinema Corporation/United Artists	D. W. Griffith	Karl Struss, G.W. Bitzer	Menzies credited for "Settings" Released in an 8-reel silent version
1929	Coquette	Mary Pickford Film Corporation/United Artists	Sam Taylor	Karl Struss	Menzies credited for "Settings"; silent version planned, Pickford cancelled it
1929	Alibi	Feature Productions/United Artists	Roland West	Ray June	Menzies credited as "Art Director""; released in 8-reel silent version
1929	This is Heaven	Samuel Goldwyn Productions/United Artists	Alfred Santell	George Barnes, Gregg Toland	Menzies credited as "Art Director""
1929	Bull Drummond	Samuel Goldwyn Productions/United Artists	F. Richard Jones	George Barnes, Gregg Toland	Menzies credited for "Settings""; released in 7-reel silent version
1929	Three Live Ghosts	Feature Productions/United Artists	Thornton Freeland	Robert Planck	Menzies credited as "Art Director""
1929	Impressions of Tchaikovsky's Overture 1812	Feature Productions/United Artists	Hugo Riesenfeld (producer)	Karl Struss	Menzies credited with "Pictorial Effects"
1929	The Taming of the Shrew	Mary Pickford Corporation, Elton Corporation/United Artists	Sam Taylor	Karl Struss	Menzies credited as "Art Director"
1929	The Locked Door	Feature Productions/United Artists	George Fitzmaurice	Ray June	Menzies credited with "Settings"
1929	Condemned	Samuel Goldwyn Productions/United Artists	Wesley Ruggles	George Barnes	Menzies credited with "Settings"; also released in an 8-reel silent version
1929	Irish Fantasy	Feature Productions/United Artists	Orville O. Dull	Paul Perry	Menzies credited as "Producer" (with Hugo Riesenfeld)
1929	New York Nights	Joseph M. Schenck Productions/United Artists	Lewis Milestone	Ray June	Menzies credited as "Art Director""; released in 8-reel silent version
1930	Lummox	Feature Productions/United Artists	Herbert Brenon	Karl Struss	Menzies credited with "Settings"

=== Sound Era: 1930-1955 ===
Year	Title	Studio	Director	Photography	Notes
1930	Glorious Vamps	Feature Productions/United Artists	Orville O. Dull	Robert Planck	Menzies credited as "Producer" (with Hugo Riesenfeld)
1930	Be Yourself!	Joseph M. Schenck Productions/United Artists	Thornton Freeland	Karl Struss	Menzies credited as "Associate Producer" (with John W. Considine Jr.) and for "Settings"
1930	Puttin' on the Ritz	Joseph M. Schenck Productions/United Artists	Edward Sloman	Ray June	Menzies credited as "Associate Producer" (with John W. Considine Jr.) and for "Settings"
1930	The Wizard's Apprentice	Feature Productions/United Artists	Sydney Levee	Alfred Schmidt	Menzies credited as "Producer" with John W. Considine Jr.
1930	One Romantic Night	Joseph M. Schenck Productions/United Artists	Paul S. Stein	Karl Struss	Menzies credited for "Settings"
1930	The Bad One	Joseph M. Schenck Productions/United Artists	George Fitzmaurice	Karl Struss	Menzies credited as "Art and Technical Director"
1930	Hungarian Rhapsody	Feature Productions/United Artists	Eugene Forde	Robert Planck	Menzies credited as "Producer" (with Hugo Riesenfeld)
1930	Raffles	Samuel Goldwyn Productions/United Artists	Harry d'Abbadie d'Arrast, George Fitzmaurice	George Barnes, Gregg Toland	Menzies credited for "Art Direction"
1930	Forever Yours	Mary Pickford Film Corporation/never distributed	Marshall Neilan	Karl Struss	Menzies credited as "Art Director"; project abandoned after 6 weeks of shooting. Reshot as Secrets in 1933
1930	Zampa	Feature Productions/United Artists	Eugene Forde	Karl Struss	Menzies credited as "Producer" (with Hugo Riesenfeld)
1930	Du Barry, Woman of Passion	Feature Productions/United Artists	Sam Taylor	Oliver Marsh	Menzies credited with "Settings"
1930	The Lottery Bride	Joseph M. Schenck Productions/United Artists	Paul L.Stein	Ray June	Menzies credited with "Settings and Effects"
1930	Abraham Lincoln	Feature Productions/United Artists	D. W. Griffith	Karl Struss	Menzies credited with "Settings"
1931	Reaching for the Moon	Feature Productions/United Artists	Edmund Goulding	Ray June, Robert Planck	Menzies credited with "Settings"
1931	Kiki	Feature Productions/United Artists	Earle Browne	Karl Struss	Menzies credited with "Settings"
1931	Always Goodbye	20th Century Fox	William Cameron Menzies, Kenneth MacKenna	Arthur Edeson	Menzies credited only as co-director, William S. Darling for Art Direction
1931	The Spider	20th Century Fox	William Cameron Menzies, Kenneth MacKenna	James Wong Howe	Menzies credited as co-director, Gordon Wiles for Art Direction
1932	Almost Married	20th Century Fox	William Cameron Menzies, Marcel Varnel	John J. Mescall	Menzies credited as co-director, Gordon Wiles for Art Direction
1932	Chandu the Magician	20th Century Fox	Marcel Varnel, William Cameron Menzies	James Wong Howe	Menzies credited as co-director, Max Parker for Art Direction
1933	Cavalcade	20th Century Fox	Frank Lloyd, William Cameron Menzies	Ernest Palmer	Menzies credited with directing "War Scenes", William Darling for Art Direction
1933	Trick for Treat	20th Century Fox	Hamilton MacFadden	O. W. O'Connell	Menzies credited for "Technical Effects", Duncan Cramer for Art Direction
1933	I Loved You Wednesday	20th Century Fox	Henry King, William Cameron Menzies	Hal Mohr	Menzies credited as co-director, Joseph C. Wright for Art Direction
1933	Alice in Wonderland	Paramount Pictures/Paramount Pictures	Norman Z. McLeod, William Cameron Menzies (uncredited)	Harry Sharp, Bert Glennon	Menzies uncredited co-director and co-screenwriter, Technical Effects by Gordon Jennings, Farciot Edouart
1934	Wharf Angel	Paramount Pictures/Paramount Pictures	William Cameron Menzies, George Somnes	Victor Milner	Art Directors Hans Dreier, John Goodman
1934	The Notorious Sophie Lang	Paramount Pictures/Paramount Pictures	Ralph Murphy, William Cameron Menzies (uncredited)	Alfred Gilks	Art Directors Hans Dreier, Robert Odell
1934	Cleopatra	Paramount Pictures/Paramount Pictures	Cecil B. DeMille, William Cameron Menzies	Alfred Gilks	Menzies credited with "Montage"; Art Directors Hans Dreier, Roland Anderson
1936	Things to Come	London Film Company/United Artists	William Cameron Menzies	Georges Périnal, Edward Cohen	Special Effects Ned Mann
1937	The Green Cockatoo	New World Pictures/20th Century Fox	William Cameron Menzies	Mutz Greenbaum	Menzies uncredited co-producer with William K. Howard
1937	Nothing Sacred	Selznick International/United Artists	William A. Wellman	W. Howard Greene	Menzies assistant to Producer David O. Selznick
1938	The Adventures of Tom Sawyer	Selznick International/United Artists	William Cameron Menzies	James Wong Howe	Art Director Lyle R. Wheeler; Cave sequence designed by Menzies
1938	The Young in Heart	Selznick International/United Artists	Richard Wallace, Lewis Milestone (uncredited)	Leon Shamroy	Menzies credited as "Production Designer"; Lyle R. Wheeler Art Director
1939	Made for Each Other	Selznick International/United Artists	John Cromwell	Leon Shamroy	Menzies credited as "Production Designer"; Lyle R. Wheeler Art Director
1939	Gone With the Wind	Selznick International/United Artists	Victor Fleming	Leon Shamroy	Menzies credited as "Production Designer"; Lyle R. Wheeler Art Director
1940	Cavalcade of the Academy Awards	Academy of Motion Pictures Arts and Sciences/Warner Bros.	Numerous contributors	Numerous contributors	Menzies appears briefly in this 17 minute production, accepting a special award for Gone With the Wind.
1940	Rebecca	Selznick International/United Artists	Alfred Hitchcock, William Cameron Menzies (uncredited)	George Barnes	Menzies directed the shots at Manderlay, and the beach cottage scenes with the dog Jasper; Lyle R. Wheeler Art Director
1940	Our Town	Principal Artists/United Artists	Sam Wood	Bert Glennon	Menzies credited as "Production Designer"; Lewis J. Rachmil Art Director
1940	Foreign Correspondent	Walter Wanger Productions/United Artists	Alfred Hitchcock	Rudolph Maté	Menzies credited for "Special Production Effects"; Alexander Golitzen Art Director
1940	The Thief of Bagdad	Alexander Korda Productions/United Artists	Michael Powell, William Cameron Menzies (uncredited)	Ludwig Berger, Michael Powell	Menzies co-director (uncredited)
1941	Meet John Doe	Frank Capra Productions/Vitagraph Studios	Frank Capra	George Barnes	Menzies reports working on this project for a month, and publicity indicated that he was production designer (uncredited), Stephen Goosson Art Director
1941	So Ends Our Night	David L. Loew-Albert Lewin, Inc./United Artists	John Cromwell	William Daniels	Menzies credited as "Production Designer"; Jack Otterson Art Director
1941	The Devil and Miss Jones	Frank Ross-Norman Krasna, Inc./RKO Pictures	Sam Wood	Harry Stradling	Menzies credited as "Production Designer"; Van Nest Polglase Art Director
1942	Kings Row	Warner Bros./Warner Bros.	Sam Wood	James Wong Howe	Menzies credited as "Production Designer"; Carl Jules Weyl Art Director
1943	The Pride of the Yankees	Samuel Goldwyn Productions/RKO Pictures	Sam Wood	Rudolph Maté	Menzies credited as "Production Designer"; Perry Ferguson Art Director
1943	Mr. Lucky	RKO Pictures	H. C. Potter	George Barnes	Menzies credited as "Production Designer"; Albert S. D'Agostino, Mark-Lee Kirk Art Directors
1943	For Whom the Bell Tolls	Paramount Pictures/Paramount Pictures	Sam Wood	Ray Rennahan	Menzies credited as "Production Designer"; Hans Dreier, Akim Tamiroff Art Directors
1943	The North Star	Samuel Goldwyn Productions/RKO Radio Pictures	Lewis Milestone	James Wong Howe	Menzies credited as "Associate Producer"; Perry Ferguson Art Director
1944	Address Unknown	Address Unknown, Inc. (Sam Wood)./Columbia Pictures	William Cameron Menzies	Rudolph Maté	Menzies listed as "Producer-Director"
1945	Spellbound	Vanguard Films/United Artists	Alfred Hitchcock	George Barnes	Menzies "consulted on the dream sequence...based on designs by Salvador Dalí."; James Basevi, Art Director
1946	Duel in the Sun	Vanguard Films/RKO Radio Pictures	King Vidor	Lee Garmes, Hal Rosson	Menzies listed as a "Second Unit Director" (uncredited), on loan from RKO, he directed the "barbecue sequence" during his 5 days on the project.
1946	Deadline at Dawn	RKO Radio Pictures/RKO Radio Pictures	Harold Clurman, William Cameron Menzies (uncredited)	Nicholas Musuraca	Albert S. D'Agostino, Jack Okey Art Directors
1946	It's a Wonderful Life	Liberty Films/RKO Radio Pictures	Frank Capra,	Joseph Walker, Joseph Biroc	Menzies consulted on a number of sequences, and observed some of the shooting. (uncredited), Jack Okey Art Director
1947	Ivy	Inter-Wood Productions/Universal International	Sam Wood	Russell Metty	Menzies credited as "Producer" Richard H. Riedel, Art Director
1948	Arch of Triumph	Arch of Triumph, Inc. (Enterprise)/Universal International	Lewis Milestone	Ray Rennahan	Menzies credited as "Production Designer"; William E. Flannery, Art Director
1949	The Tell-Tale Heart	Menzies-Finney/Telepak	Jules Dassin		Nominated for Emmy Award for Best Film Made for Television, 1948. Released on ABC TV Actors Studio
1949	A Terribly Strange Bed	Telepak/ Post Pictures Corp.	William Cameron Menzies		Nominated for Emmy Award for Best Film Made for Television, 1948.
1949	The Marionette Mystery	Menzies-Finney/Telepak	William Cameron Menzies	William O'Connell	Nominated for Emmy Award for Best Film Made for Television, 1948.
1949	Reign of Terror	Walter Wanger Pictures, Inc./Eagle-Lion Films	Anthony Mann	Ray Rennahan	Menzies credited as "Producer", film re-titled The Black Book before October 1949 opening in New York
1951	The Whip Hand	RKO Radio Pictures/RKO Radio Pictures	William Cameron Menzies	Nicholas Musuraca	Menzies also credited as "Production Designer", Albert S. D'Agostino, Carroll Clark Art Directors
1951	Drums in the Deep South	King Brothers Productions/RKO Radio Pictures	William Cameron Menzies	Lionel Lindon	Menzies also credited as "Production Designer", Frank Paul Sylos Art Director
1952	The Zayat Kiss	Herles Enterprises	William Cameron Menzies	Edward Hyland	Airtime for the TV production not established, made in New York, April 1952
1952	The Wild Heart	London Films, Vanguard Films/RKO Radio Pictures	Michael Powell, Emeric Pressburger, William Cameron Menzies (uncredited)	Chris Challis	Menzies "made retakes and directed added scenes, February 1951. Titled Gone to Earth in British release.
1952	We're Not Married!	20th Century-Fox	Edmond Goulding	Leo Tover	Menzies served as "montage director". At his request, he was not extended any credit or publicity for his work.
1953	Androcles and the Lion	RKO Radio Pictures/RKO Radio Pictures	Chester Erskine	Harry Stradling	Harry Horner credited as "Production Designer", Menzies uncredited. Albert S. D'Agostino, Charles F. Pike Art Directors
1953	Invaders from Mars	National Pictures Corp./20th Century-Fox	William Cameron Menzies	John Seitz	Menzies also credited as "Production Designer", Boris Leven Art Director
1953	The Maze	Allied Artists	William Cameron Menzies	Harry Neumann	Menzies also credited as "Production Designer", David Scott Milton Art Director
1954	A String of Beads	Everest Productions/Allied Artists	William Cameron Menzies	George E. Diskant	A TV pilot for CBS's Four Star Playhouse
1954	Star Studded Ride	Universal Pictures	William Cameron Menzies		Short subject assembled from Sol Lesser's Three-D Follies
1954	Autumn in Rome	Selznick Releasing Organization/Columbia Pictures	William Cameron Menzies	James Wong Howe	Short film to serve as a prologue to Indiscretion of an American Wife, vocals by Patti Page, score Alessandro Cicognini.
1954	The Halls of Ivy, 39-episode TV production	Television Programs of America	William Cameron Menzies, Norman Z. McLeod	Robert Picttack, Alfred Gilks	Menzies directed half of the episodes that comprised the series.
1955	Johnny and the Gaucho		William Cameron Menzies		Menzies directed the pilot for this TV program
1956	Around the World in Eighty Days	Michael Todd Co./United Artists	Michael Anderson	Lionel Lindon	Menzies credited as "Associate Producer" and "Production Designer", James W. Sullivan Art Director

== Theatre credits ==
Year	Title	Author	Theater	Director	Notes
1923 (opened 8 October)	The Lullaby	Edward Knoblock	Knickerbocker Theatre	Fred G. Latham	Scenery and costumes designed by William Cameron Menzies
1931 (Opened 21 January)	The Ambulance Chaser	Bella and Samuel Spewack	Hollywood Playhouse		Scenery designed by William Cameron Menzies
1932 (opened 28 December)	Grand Guignol	H. F. Maltby, Andre de Lorde, et al.	Hollywood Music Box	Robert Vignola, Donald Crisp, Reginald Berkeley	Scenery designed by William Cameron Menzies
1941 (opened 30 July)	Anna Christie	Eugene O'Neill	Lobero Theatre, (Santa Barbara, California	John Houseman	Sketches for scenery design by William Cameron Menzies. (Two-week showing in San Francisco's Curran Theatre, opened 4 August 1941)

== DVD release ==
In October 2009, Alpha Video released the public domain collection The Fantastic World of William Cameron Menzies on DVD, which included four early experimental films created by Menzies and Joseph M. Schenck, shorts that visualize great works of classical music:

- "Irish Fantasy" (1929)
- "Impressions of Tschaikowsky's Overture '1812'" (1930)
- "Hungarian Rhapsody" (1930)
- Paul Dukas' "The Wizard's Apprentice" (1930).

According to Dave Kehr, The Wizard's Apprentice "clearly influenced Disney's version in Fantasia.

== See also ==
- Art Directors Guild Hall of Fame
