= The Girl and the Gambler =

1939 film by Lew Landers

- Directed by: Lew Landers; James Anderson (assistant)
- Written by: Joseph A. Fields; Clarence Upson Young
- Based on: play The Dove by Willard Mack
- Produced by: Cliff Reid
- Starring: Tim Holt; Leo Carrillo
- Music by: Roy Webb
- Production company: RKO Radio Pictures
- Release date: June 16, 1939
- Country: United States
- Language: English

The Girl and the Gambler is a 1939 Western film, from RKO Radio Pictures, starring Tim Holt. It was an early starring Western for Holt, who soon replaced George O'Brien as the studio's main Western star.

The film was based on a play which had been filmed by RKO in 1932 as Girl of the Rio.

It was originally called The Dove.

== Cast ==
- Tim Holt as Johnny Powell
- Leo Carrillo as El Rayo
- Steffi Duna as Dolores "The Dove" Romero
- Esther Muir as Madge
- Paul Fix as Charlie
- Donald MacBride as Mike Bascom

== Reception ==
The New York Times called it "a dead duck".

== See also ==
- The Dove (1927)

== External list ==
- The Girl and the Gambler at IMDb
