= Tempest (1928 film) =

1928 film by Sam Taylor

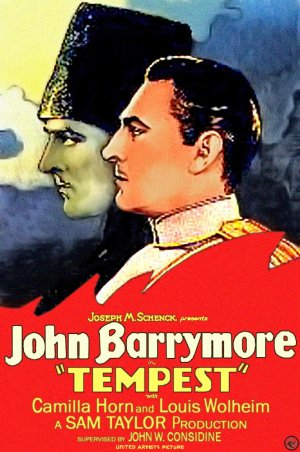
- Directed by: Sam Taylor; Lewis Milestone (uncredited); Victor Tourjansky (uncredited)
- Written by: Vladimir Nemirovich-Danchenko; C. Gardner Sullivan; Lewis Milestone (uncredited); Erich von Stroheim (uncredited); George Marion Jr. (intertitles; uncredited)
- Produced by: John W. Considine Jr.; Joseph M. Schenck
- Starring: John Barrymore; Camilla Horn; George Fawcett; Louis Wolheim
- Cinematography: Charles Rosher
- Edited by: Allen McNeil
- Production company: Feature Productions
- Distributed by: United Artists
- Release date: May 27, 1928
- Running time: 111 minutes
- Country: United States
- Languages: Sound (Synchronized); English Intertitles
- Budget: $1.2 million

Tempest is a 1928 American synchronized sound drama film directed by Sam Taylor. While the film has no audible dialog, it was released with a synchronized musical score with sound effects using both the sound-on-disc and sound-on-film process. V. I. Nemirovich-Dantchenko wrote the screenplay and William Cameron Menzies won an Academy Award for Best Art Direction for his work in the film in 1929, the first year of the awards ceremony. John Barrymore and Camilla Horn star in the film, with Louis Wolheim co-starring.

Preserved by two United States archives, the George Eastman House and the UCLA Film & Television Archive, Tempest has been released on DVD by Image Entertainment.

== Plot ==
In Czarist Russia, Ivan Markov, a patriotic peasant youth, rises through the ranks after earning the admiration of a celebrated military leader, the General, who commissions him a lieutenant. Ivan falls hopelessly in love with the General's daughter, Princess Tamara, but she is already engaged to a pompous officer, Captain Egorov, a snobbish member of her father's staff.

At a grand ball, the princess spurns Ivan with cold disdain. Humiliated and drunk, Ivan forces his way into her bedchamber, collapses in a stupor, and before losing consciousness, he scrawls "I love you — Ivan" on the back of a sacred icon he wears and leaves it on her pillow. Shocked to find Ivan in her room, Tamara calls her father and fiancé. Ivan is arrested, stripped of his rank, and imprisoned.

Loyal to his comrade, Sergeant Bulba deliberately insults an officer and joins Ivan in prison. There, they are visited by a peddler, secretly a revolutionary agent. Though previously rebuked by Ivan for spreading anti-czarist propaganda, the peddler now persuades him to join the growing revolutionary movement.

Tamara, remorseful and realizing her true feelings, visits Ivan in his cell. But Ivan, hardened by betrayal and humiliation, bitterly denounces her and the aristocracy, proud instead of his peasant roots. Captain Egorov, having eavesdropped, accuses her of betrayal and Tamara breaks their engagement, confessing that her heart still belongs to Ivan.

In retaliation, Egorov arranges for Ivan's solitary confinement, falsely claiming it was at Tamara's behest. When World War I breaks out, all political prisoners are released for service—except Ivan. Alone, Ivan begins to lose his sanity until the Bolsheviks seize power. The peddler, now a high-ranking Commissar, frees Ivan and appoints him second-in-command of the revolutionary tribunal. Bulba, returned from the front, is now a senior figure in the new regime.

At the tribunal, Ivan and the peddler condemn aristocrats to death. Among the prisoners is Princess Tamara, captured while trying to save her father. Still torn between love and rage, Ivan has her thrown into the same prison cell he once occupied. He visits her alone; she bears his harsh words in silence until she collapses in his arms. In that moment, Ivan sees she has always loved him—she still wears the icon he left on her pillow.

Leaving Bulba to guard Tamara, Ivan rushes to the execution yard where he finds the General, his former mentor, facing a firing squad. The old man dies in Ivan's arms. Appalled by the brutality of the regime he now serves, Ivan storms into the commissar's office. The peddler accuses him of treason. In a moment of self-defense and moral awakening, Ivan kills him.

Ivan escapes with Tamara and Bulba in a waiting sleigh. Together, they flee the bloodshed of the revolution, finding sanctuary in a new land—and a chance at peace and happiness.

== Cast ==
- John Barrymore as Sgt. Ivan Markov
- Camilla Horn as Princess Tamara
- Louis Wolheim as Sgt. Bulba
- Boris de Fast as Peddler/Commissar
- George Fawcett as General
- Ullrich Haupt as Captain
- Michael Visaroff as Guard

== Music ==
The film featured a theme song entitled "Love Waltz" by Hugo Riesenfeld. The song is sung by baritone August Werner and soprano Anna Savina on the soundtrack. Although the song "Out Of The Tempest" which was composed by Edward Grossman and Ted Ward was published as the theme song of the film, it does not occur in the actual soundtrack of the film.

== Accolades ==
The film won the first Academy Award for Production Design along with 1927's The Dove as both were designed by William Cameron Menzies. The award was originally called Best Interior Decoration.

== See also ==
- List of early sound feature films (1926–1929)
