= Michael Vavitch =

American actor

Mikhail Vavich
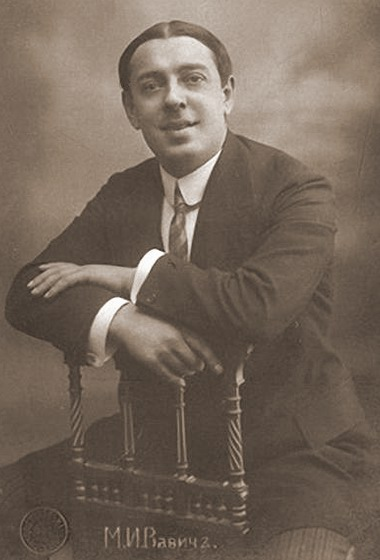
- Mikhail Vavitch (1914)
- Born: 1881 or 1885; Odessa, Russian Empire
- Died: October 5, 1930; Hollywood, California, US
- Occupations: Actor, singer
- Years active: 1905–1930

Mikhail Vavich (Russian: Михаил Иванович Вавич) was a Russian singer and actor who worked in Hollywood in the silent era.

== Biography ==
Born and raised in Odessa, Mikhail Vavitch first performed in 1905 on stage at St. Petersburg in a private operetta by Petr Tumpakov. He received recognition in 1906 after performing the role of the Viscount Cascada in the operetta The Merry Widow by Lehar. From 1905 thru 1918 he worked in the operetta theaters of St. Petersburg and Moscow. From the season of 1908/1909 Vavitch became an actor of a troupe of the Moscow theater, Hermitage.

In 1914 he married the drama actress Tatyana Pavlova, with her he acted in several movies.

In 1917, he emigrated to Europe. At the beginning of the 1920s, Vavitch moved to the United States, living and working in Los Angeles, probably with the encouragement of Joseph Schenck. He periodically appeared in operetta.

During the 1922–1923 season, he participated in the famous revue La Chauve-Souris on Broadway, directed by Nikita Balieff.

In the mid-1920s Vavitch started his Hollywood career by acting in silent movies and soon gained success as a supporting actor.

He died from a heart attack in Hollywood on October 5, 1930, on the road in his own car.

After a traditional ceremony of the Russian Orthodox funeral service the actor was buried at Serbian Orthodox Cemetery in Los Angeles.

== Partial filmography ==
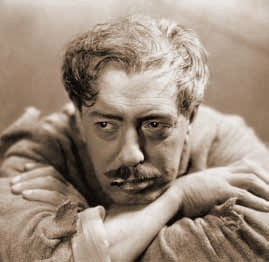
Michael Vavitch in the film "Venus of Venice", 1927.

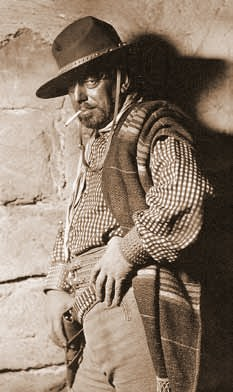
Michael Vavitch as a cowboy (The Dove, 1927).

- The Swan (1925)
- Graustark (1925)
- The Crown of Lies (1926)
- The Third Degree (1926)
- The Midnight Sun (1926)
- Valencia (1926)
- Her Man o' War (1926)
- Hotel Imperial (1927)
- Venus of Venice (1927)
- Two Arabian Knights (1927)
- The Devil Dancer (1927)
- The Gaucho (1927)
- The Dove (1927)
- Glorious Betsy (1928)
- The Woman Disputed (1928)
- A Thief in the Dark (1928)
- Wolf Song (1929)
- The Bridge of San Luis Rey (1929)
- The Divine Lady (1929)
- The Big House (1930)
- A Devil with Women (1930)
- War Nurse (1930)
- La Sevillana (1930)
"Вот, что наделали песни твои!", romance by Mikhail Steinberg, 1906

"Ах, я влюблён в одни глаза...", music by Aleksandr Vilensky, poem by Tatiana Shchepkina-Kupernik, 1909

"Грусть и тоска...", romance by M. Vavitch performed by the author, 1912

"Bells are ringing… (in Russian)", romance (music) by Mikhail Steinberg, poem by Stepan Skitalets, 1912

An early version of the song "On the Hills of Manchuria", 1912

"Utro tumannoye" (romance (music) by Erast Abaza, poem by Ivan Turgenev), 1908
