= Girl of the Rio =

1932 film

- Theatrical poster of the film
- Directed by: Herbert Brenon; Ray Lissner (assistant)
- Screenplay by: Elizabeth Meehan; Louis Stevens
- Based on: the play, The Dove by Willard Mack
- Produced by: William LeBaron; Louis Sarecky (associate)
- Starring: Dolores del Río; Leo Carrillo
- Cinematography: Leo Tover
- Edited by: Arthur Roberts
- Music by: Victor Schertzinger
- Production company: RKO Pictures
- Distributed by: RKO Pictures
- Release date: January 15, 1932 (US)
- Running time: 70 minutes
- Country: United States
- Language: English

Girl of the Rio is a 1932 American pre-Code RKO musical film that starred Dolores del Río and Leo Carrillo. Directed by Herbert Brenon, the screenplay was written by Elizabeth Meehan and Louis Stevens, based on the play, The Dove by Willard Mack, which was itself based on a magazine article by Gerald Beaumont. The film is a remake of the 1927 silent film, The Dove, starring Norma Talmadge.

== Plot ==
South of the U.S. border, Don José Tostado, a Mexican caballero, falls in love with Dolores Romero, a dance-hall girl. Owning one of the larger ranches in the area, Tostado is not used to people telling him no. When Romero resists his advances, using a fictional boyfriend as her excuse, this only increases his interest in her, and his attempts to win her favor. As part of that attempt, he plans to throw a gala in her honor.

Meanwhile, Romero falls for Johnny Powell, a dealer at a nearby casino. She confides in him that she has no interest in Tostado, but doesn't know how to get him to leave her alone. Powell offers to take her away and get married. They make their plans, but before they can carry them out, Tostado learns of them and hatches a plot of his own: he frames Powell for a murder and has him arrested. When Dolores hears that Tostado has paid the jailer to kill Johnny during an escape attempt, she makes a deal with Tostado to give herself to him in exchange for Johnny's life and freedom. Tostado agrees.

When Johnny is freed, Dolores makes it clear that she is no longer interested in him, and that she intends to marry Tostado. Dolores leaves with Tostado, heading for his ranch. On the way, she attempts to commit suicide, but is stopped by Tostado, who is startled to discover that she would rather be dead than be stuck with him for the rest of her life. When they arrive back at his hacienda, they are surprised by Johnny, who fights Tostado. When they police arrive, they arrest Johnny, and are ready to execute him summarily, on Tostado's orders. Dolores intercedes on Johnny's behalf, and her pleas have their desired effect. Realizing that he's beaten, Tostado calls off the police, and lets Dolores leave with Johnny.

== Cast ==
- Dolores del Río as Dolores Romero
- Leo Carrillo as Don José Tostado
- Norman Foster as Johnny Powell
- Stanley Fields as Mike Marovich
- Frank Campeau as Bill
- Lucille Webster Gleason as Madame Double Chin
- Ralph Ince as O'Grady
- Edna Murphy as Madge

== Production ==
The short story, "The Blue Ribbon", written by Gerald Beaumont, was printed in Red Book Magazine in their January 1923 issue. Willard Mack used that story as the basis for his play, The Dove, which was produced by David Belasco on Broadway at the Empire Theatre, premiering on August 24, 1925. In the leads were Judith Anderson as Dolores, Holbrook Blinn as Tostado, and William Harrigan as Johnny. In 1927 United Artists purchased the rights to the play, and produced a silent version of Mack's play, The Dove, starring Norma Talmadge, Noah Beery, Sr., and Gilbert Roland. RKO Pictures purchased the rights in 1931. The film was in production from September to November 1931. The film was Dolores del Río's first feature for RKO Pictures.

== Notes ==
In 1939, RKO would remake the film, this time under the title The Girl and the Gambler, starring Tim Holt as Johnny and Steffi Duna as Dolores. Carillo would reprise his role as the Don, although this time the character's name would be El Rayo.
