= The Third Degree (1926 film) =

1926 film by Michael Curtiz

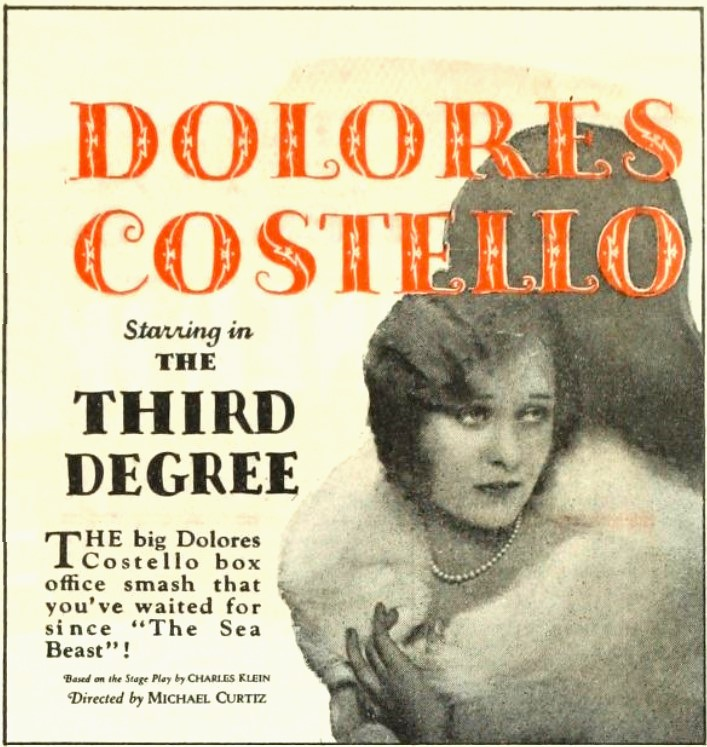
- Advertisement
- Directed by: Michael Curtiz
- Written by: Graham Baker (scenario)
- Based on: play by Charles Klein
- Starring: Dolores Costello; Louise Dresser
- Cinematography: Hal Mohr
- Edited by: Clarence Kolster
- Production company: Warner Bros.
- Distributed by: Warner Bros.
- Release date: December 1, 1926 (U.S.)
- Running time: 80 minutes
- Country: United States
- Language: Silent (English intertitles)
- Budget: $208,000
- Box office: $413,000

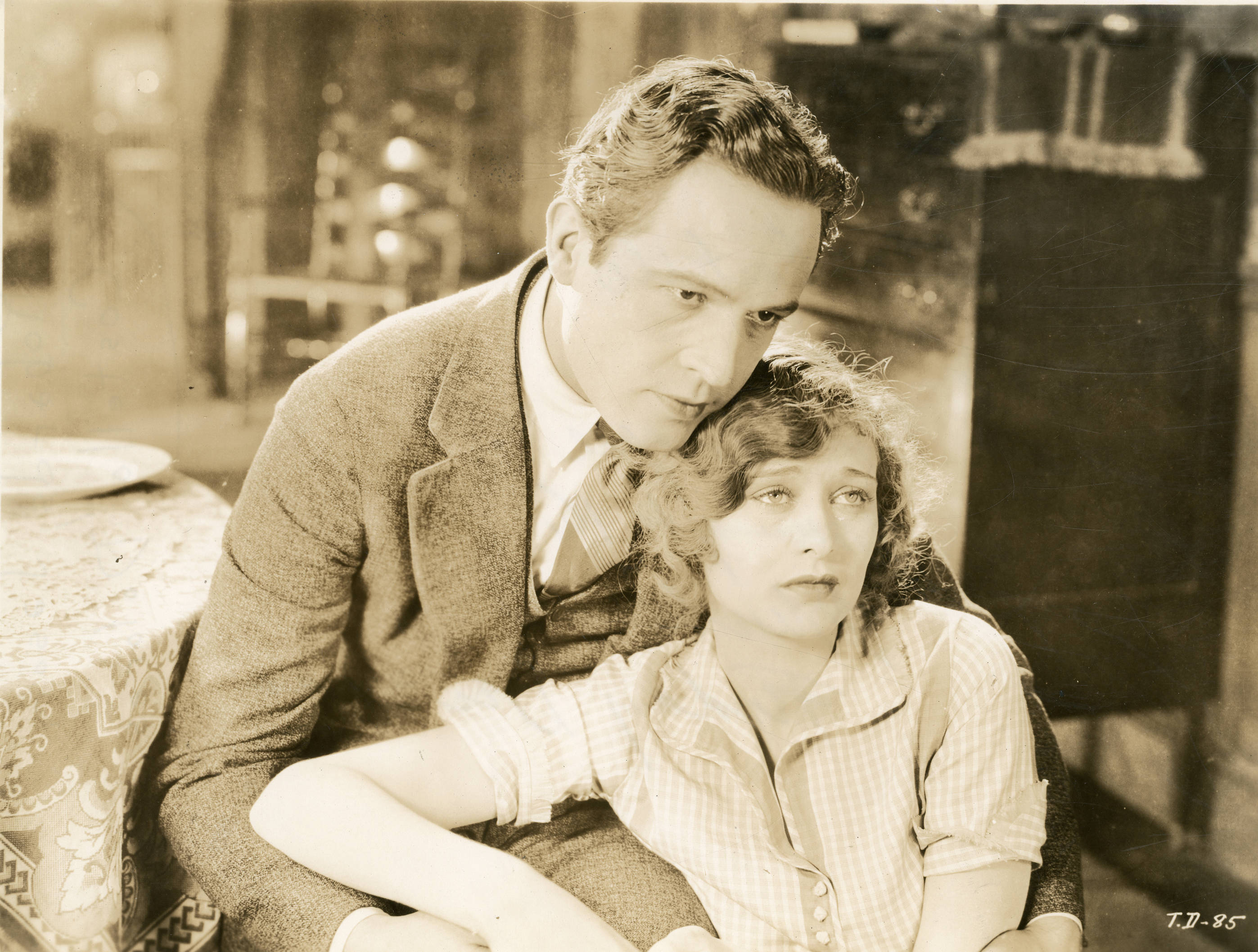
The Third Degree film still with Jason Robards and Dolores Costello

The Third Degree is a 1926 American silent romance film produced and distributed by Warner Bros. and directed by Michael Curtiz, in his first American film. Starring Dolores Costello, it is based on the hit 1909 play of the same name written by Charles Klein that starred Helen Ware.

== Cast ==
- Dolores Costello as Annie Daly
- Louise Dresser as Alicia Daly
- Rockliffe Fellowes as Underwood
- Jason Robards Sr. as Howard Jeffries Jr.
- Kate Price as Mrs. Chubb
- Tom Santschi as Daredevil Daley
- Harry Todd as Mr. Chubb
- Mary Louise Miller as Annie as a baby
- Michael Vavitch as Clinton, Chief of Detectives
- David Torrence as Howard Jeffries Sr.
- Fred Kelsey as Assistant Chief of Detectives

== Box Office ==
According to Warner Bros records The Third Degree earned $269,000 domestically and $144,000 in foreign markets.

== Preservation ==
A copy of The Third Degree is held by the Library of Congress. Also, a 16mm print is in the Wisconsin Center for Film and Theater Research.
