= A Thief in the Dark =

1928 film

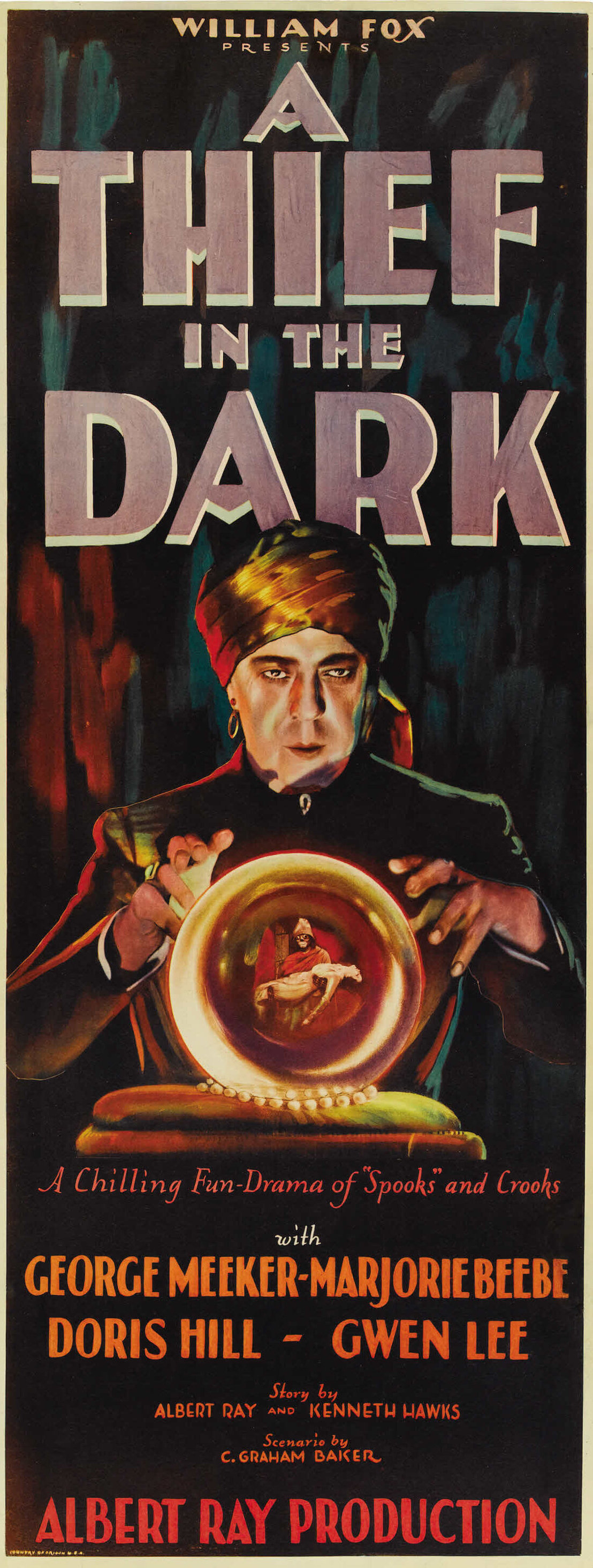
- Directed by: Albert Ray
- Screenplay by: C. Graham Baker; William Kernell
- Story by: Albert Ray; Kenneth Hawks; Andrew Bennison
- Starring: George Meeker; Doris Hill; Gwen Lee; Marjorie Beebe; Michael Vavitch; Noah Young
- Cinematography: Arthur Edeson
- Edited by: Jack Dennis
- Production company: Fox Film Corporation
- Distributed by: Fox Film Corporation
- Release date: May 20, 1928
- Running time: 60 minutes
- Country: United States
- Language: English

A Thief in the Dark is a lost 1928 American silent mystery film directed by Albert Ray, written by C. Graham Baker and William Kernell (based on a plot idea from director Ray), and starring George Meeker, Doris Hill, Gwen Lee, Marjorie Beebe, Michael Vavitch and Noah Young. The film was released on May 20, 1928, by Fox Film Corporation.

== Plot ==
A young drifter named Ernest joins a troupe of phony mystics working in a carnival, led by a Professor Xeno. Ernest learns that his colleagues are systematically burglarizing some of the wealthy homes in the towns through which they travel. Ernest finds out that Xeno has stooped to murdering an old lady for her jewelry, and sets about trying to expose Xeno to the authorities.

== Cast ==
- George Meeker as Ernest
- Doris Hill as Elise
- Gwen Lee as Flo
- Marjorie Beebe as Jeanne
- Michael Vavitch as Professor Xeno
- Noah Young as Monk
- Charles Belcher as Duke
- Ray Turner as Beauregard
- Erville Alderson as Armstrong

== Production ==
The film is thought by critics to have lifted its storyline from Tod Browning's successful 1925 film The Unholy Three. Cameraman Edeson later became one of James Whale's favorite associates, photographing Frankenstein (1931), The Old Dark House (1932) and The Invisible Man (1933) for the director.

== Preservation ==
With no holdings located in archives, A Thief in the Dark is considered a lost film.
