= The Dove (1927 film) =

1927 film directed by Roland West

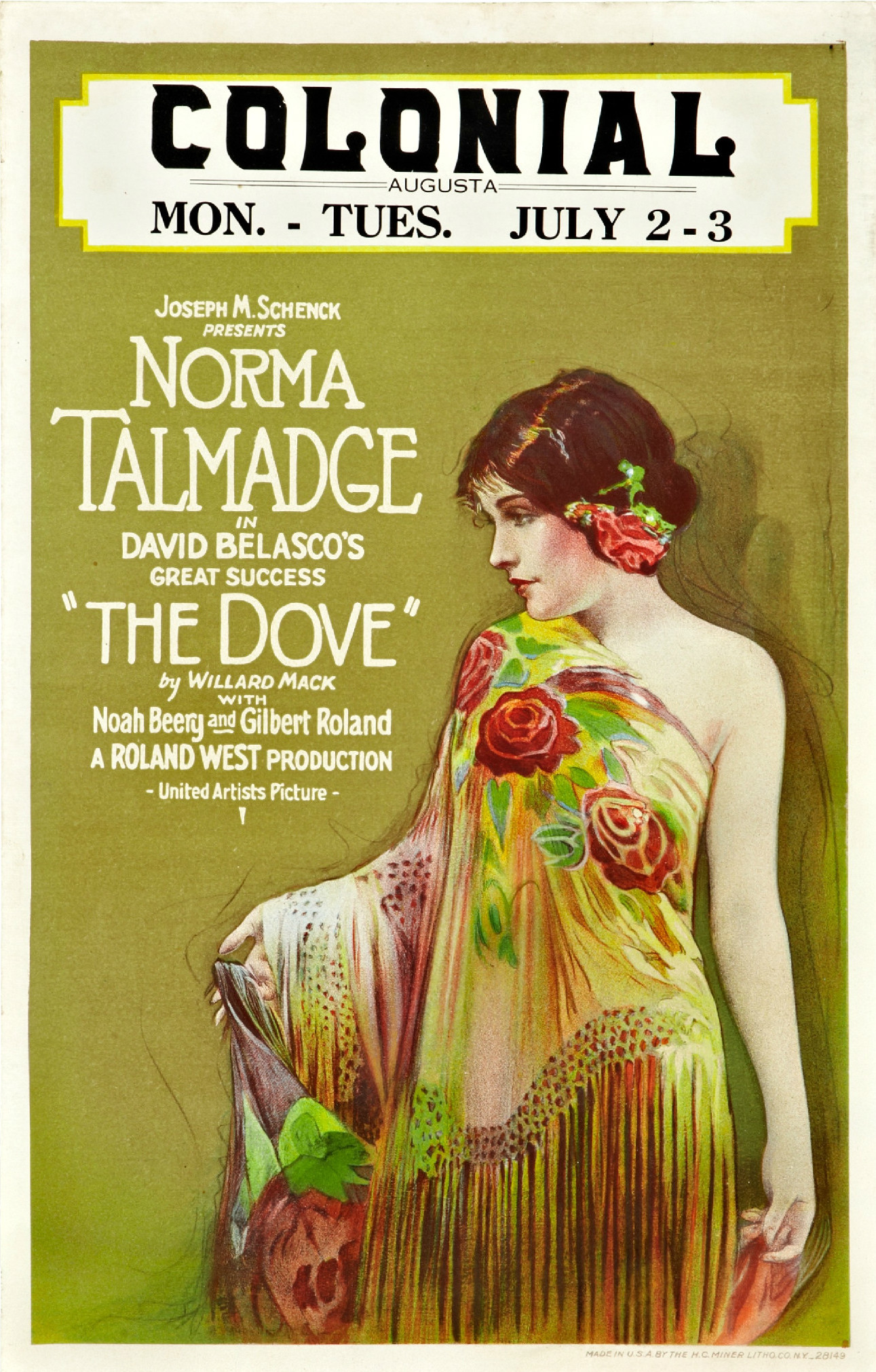
- Theatrical poster
- Directed by: Roland West
- Written by: Gerald Beaumont (story); Roland West (adaptation); Wallace Smith (adaptation, intertitles)
- Based on: The Dove by Willard Mack
- Produced by: Norma Talmadge; Joseph M. Schenck
- Starring: Norma Talmadge; Noah Beery; Gilbert Roland
- Cinematography: Oliver T. Marsh
- Edited by: Hal C. Kern
- Distributed by: United Artists
- Release date: December 31, 1927
- Running time: 90 minutes
- Country: United States
- Language: Silent (English intertitles)

The Dove is a 1927 American silent romantic drama film directed by Roland West based on a 1925 Broadway play by Willard Mack and starring Norma Talmadge, Noah Beery, and Gilbert Roland.

== Background ==
The original story is about Mexican despot Don José (Beery), who falls in love with the dancing girl Dolores (Talmadge) who rejects him. Due to the potential political repercussions of condemning Mexico, it was decided to relocate the plot to some anonymous Mediterranean country. The film was Norma Talmadge's first feature for United Artists.

== Plot ==
A despot falls for a dancing girl. After she rejects him, she has her other beau framed for murder.

== Cast ==
- Norma Talmadge as Dolores
- Noah Beery as Don José María y Sandoval
- Gilbert Roland as Johnny Powell
- Eddie Borden as Billy
- Harry Myers as Mike
- Walter Daniels as The Drunk
- Kalla Pasha as The Comandante
- Michael Vavitch as Gómez
- Brinsley Shaw as The Patriot
- Charles Darvas as The Comandante's Captain
- Michael Dark as Sandoval's Captain
- Olga Baclanova in a bit part (uncredited)
- Robert Gleckler in a bit part (uncredited)
- Mark Hamilton as Prisoner (uncredited)
- Andy MacLennan in a bit part (uncredited)
- Jack McDonald in a bit part (uncredited)
- Alice White in a bit part (uncredited)

== Recognition ==
Though the film was not well received, William Cameron Menzies won the first Academy Award for Best Art Direction in 1928 for this film and Tempest, though the award was then called "Interior Decoration."

In 1932, Herbert Brenon directed a new talkie version named Girl of the Rio, starred by Dolores del Río for RKO Radio Pictures.

== Awards and nominations ==
The Dove won the 1929 Academy Award for Best Art Direction for William Cameron Menzies.

== Preservation ==
Prints of The Dove are located in the collections of the Library of Congress and Swedish Film Institute. The Library of Congress has reels 1, 3, 4, and 8, and is missing reels 2, 5, 6, 7, and 9.
