= The Return of Jesse James =

1950 film by Arthur Hilton

- Directed by: Arthur Hilton
- Screenplay by: Jack Natteford
- Story by: Carl K. Hittleman
- Produced by: Carl K. Hittleman
- Starring: John Ireland; Ann Dvorak; Henry Hull
- Cinematography: Karl Struss
- Edited by: Harry Coswick
- Music by: Ferde Grofé Sr.
- Production company: Lippert Pictures
- Distributed by: Lippert Pictures
- Release date: September 8, 1950
- Running time: 75 minutes
- Country: United States
- Language: English

The Return of Jesse James is a 1950 American Western film directed by Arthur Hilton and starring John Ireland, Ann Dvorak and Henry Hull. It was produced and distributed by the independent Lippert Pictures. The film's art direction was led by Frank Paul Sylos and Vin Taylor.

== Plot ==
The James gang rides again with the addition of a dead ringer for the dead Jesse James.

== Cast ==
- John Ireland as Johnny Callum
- Ann Dvorak as Susan (Sue) Ellen Younger
- Henry Hull as Hank Younger
- Reed Hadley as Frank James
- Hugh O'Brian as Lem Younger
- Clifton Young as Bob Ford
- Tommy Noonan as Charlie Ford
- Victor Kilian as Westfield Sheriff Rigby
- Margia Dean as Marge
- Sid Melton as Saloon Waiter-Piano Player
- Byron Foulger as Rufe Dakin
- Paul Maxey as Elmer Galway
- Peter Marshall as George
- Norman Leavitt as Dr. Hallstrom
- Barbara Woodell as Ann—Frank's Wife
- I. Stanford Jolley as Commissioner Morton
- Robin Short as Gang Member
- Jay Barney as Cap'n Andy Milburn
- Hank Patterson as Clay County Marshal

== Production ==
The film was positioned as a sequel to the very successful I Shot Jesse James (1949), also financed by Robert L. Lippert, with John Ireland reprising his role as Robert Ford. The film was originally planned as the directorial debut of James Wong Howe, who would codirect with editor Arthur Hilton. Filming began on May 1, 1950.

== Bibliography ==
- Fetrow, Alan G. Feature Films, 1950–1959: A United States Filmography. McFarland, 1999.
