= Venus of Venice =

1927 film

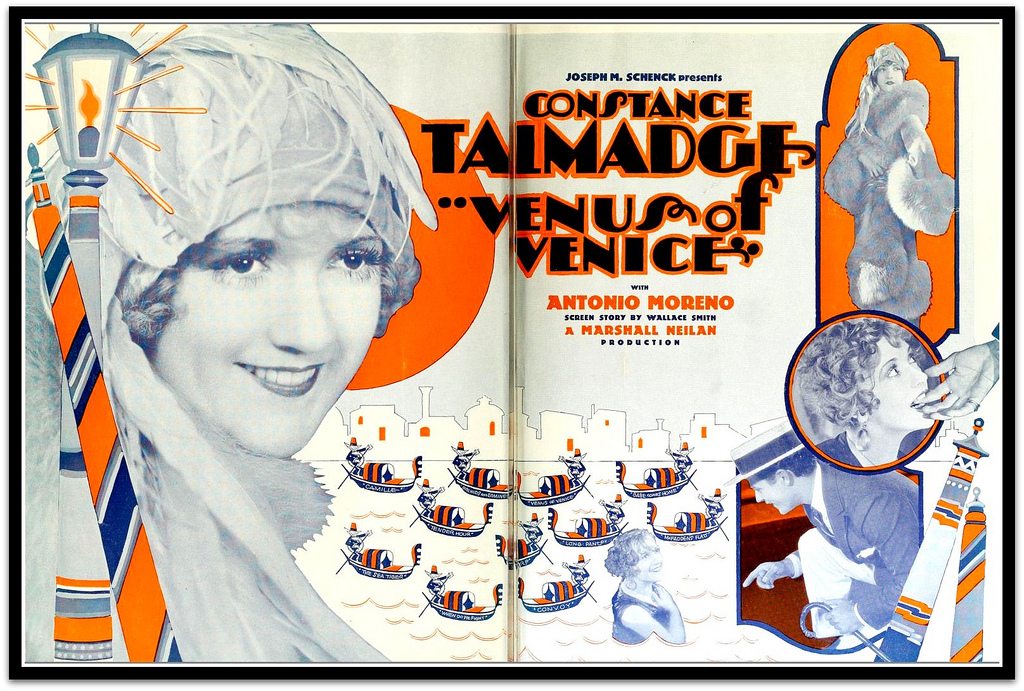
- Directed by: Marshall Neilan
- Written by: Wallace Smith (story, writing); George Marion, Jr. (titles)
- Produced by: Constance Talmadge; Joseph Schenck
- Starring: Constance Talmadge; Antonio Moreno
- Cinematography: George Barnes
- Distributed by: First National Pictures
- Release date: March 20, 1927
- Running time: 7 reels
- Country: United States
- Language: Silent (English intertitles)

Venus of Venice is a 1927 American silent romantic comedy film directed by Marshall Neilan and starring Constance Talmadge and Antonio Moreno. Talmadge's own production unit produced with distribution through First National Pictures.

== Cast ==
- Constance Talmadge as Carlotta
- Antonio Moreno as Kenneth
- Julanne Johnston as Jean
- Edward Martindel as Journalist
- Michael Vavitch as Marco
- Arthur Thalasso as Ludvico
- Andre Lanoy as Giuseppe
- Carmelita Geraghty as Bride
- Mario Carillo as Bridegroom
- Tom Ricketts as Bride's father
- Hedda Hopper as Jean's mother

== Preservation ==
With the exception of one lost reel, Venus of Venice survives. Prints held at UCLA Film & Television Archive and George Eastman Museum Motion Picture Collection.
