= Frank Paul Sylos =

American art director (1900–1976)

- Born: October 12, 1900; Brooklyn, New York, United States
- Died: April 16, 1976 (aged 75); Los Angeles, California; United States
- Other name: Frank P. Sylos
- Occupation: Art director
- Years active: 1935–1973 (film)

Frank Paul Sylos (1900–1976) was an American art director. He worked on around a hundred and ninety films during his career, as well as television shows. He is sometimes credited as Frank P. Sylos.

== Selected filmography ==
- What Becomes of the Children? (1936)
- The Fabulous Suzanne (1946)
- Albuquerque (1948)
- The Return of Jesse James (1950)
- Boy, Did I Get a Wrong Number! (1966)

== Bibliography ==
- Fetrow, Alan G. Feature Films, 1950-1959: A United States Filmography. McFarland, 1999.
