= Norma Talmadge =

American actress (1894–1957)

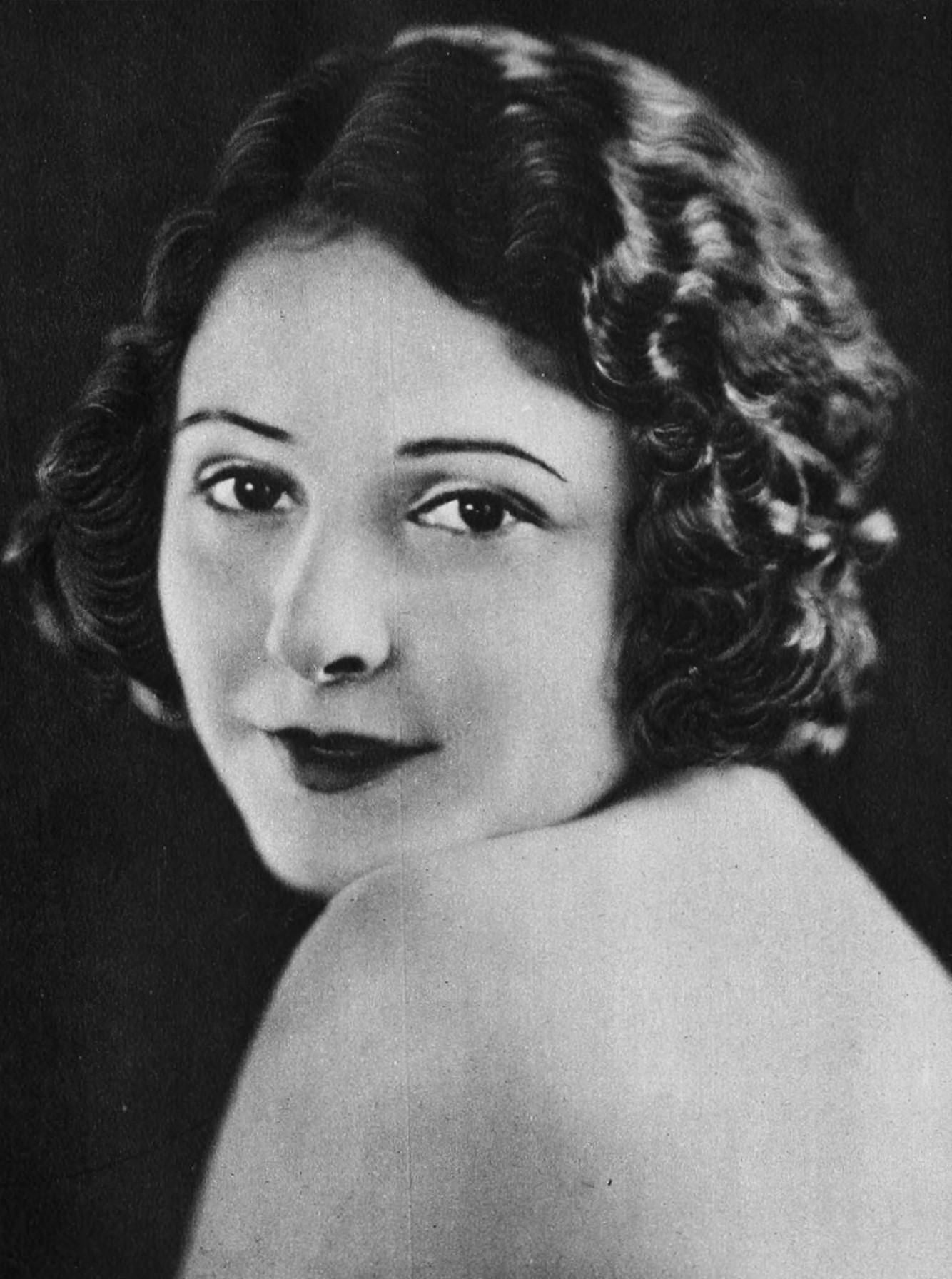
- Talmadge in 1920
- Born: Norma Marie Talmadge; May 2, 1894; Jersey City, New Jersey, U.S.
- Died: December 24, 1957 (aged 63); Las Vegas, Nevada, U.S.
- Resting place: Hollywood Forever Cemetery
- Occupations: Actress; producer
- Years active: 1909–1930
- Spouses: Joseph M. Schenck (m. 1916; div. 1934) George Jessel (m. 1934; div. 1939) Carvel James (m. 1946)
- Relatives: Natalie Talmadge (sister); Constance Talmadge (sister)

Norma Marie Talmadge (May 2, 1894 – December 24, 1957) was an American actress and film producer of the silent era. A major box-office draw for more than a decade, her career reached a peak in the early 1920s, when she ranked among the most popular idols of the American screen.

Talmadge specialized in melodrama. Her most famous film was Smilin’ Through (1922), but she also scored artistic triumphs teamed with director Frank Borzage in Secrets (1924) and The Lady (1925). Her younger sister, Constance Talmadge, was also a movie star. Talmadge married millionaire film producer Joseph M. Schenck and they successfully created their own production company. After reaching fame in the film studios on the East Coast, she moved to Hollywood in 1922.

Talmadge was one of the most elegant and glamorous film stars of the Roaring Twenties. However, by the end of the silent era, her popularity with audiences had waned. After her two talkies proved disappointing at the box office, she retired still a very wealthy woman.

== Early life ==
According to her birth certificate, Talmadge was born on May 2, 1894, in Jersey City, New Jersey. Although it has been widely reported she was born in Niagara Falls, New York, after achieving stardom, she admitted that she and her mother provided the more scenic setting of Niagara Falls to fan magazines to be more romantic. Talmadge was the eldest daughter of Frederick O. Talmadge, an unemployed chronic alcoholic, and Margaret "Peg" Talmadge. She had two younger sisters, Natalie and Constance, both of whom also became actresses.

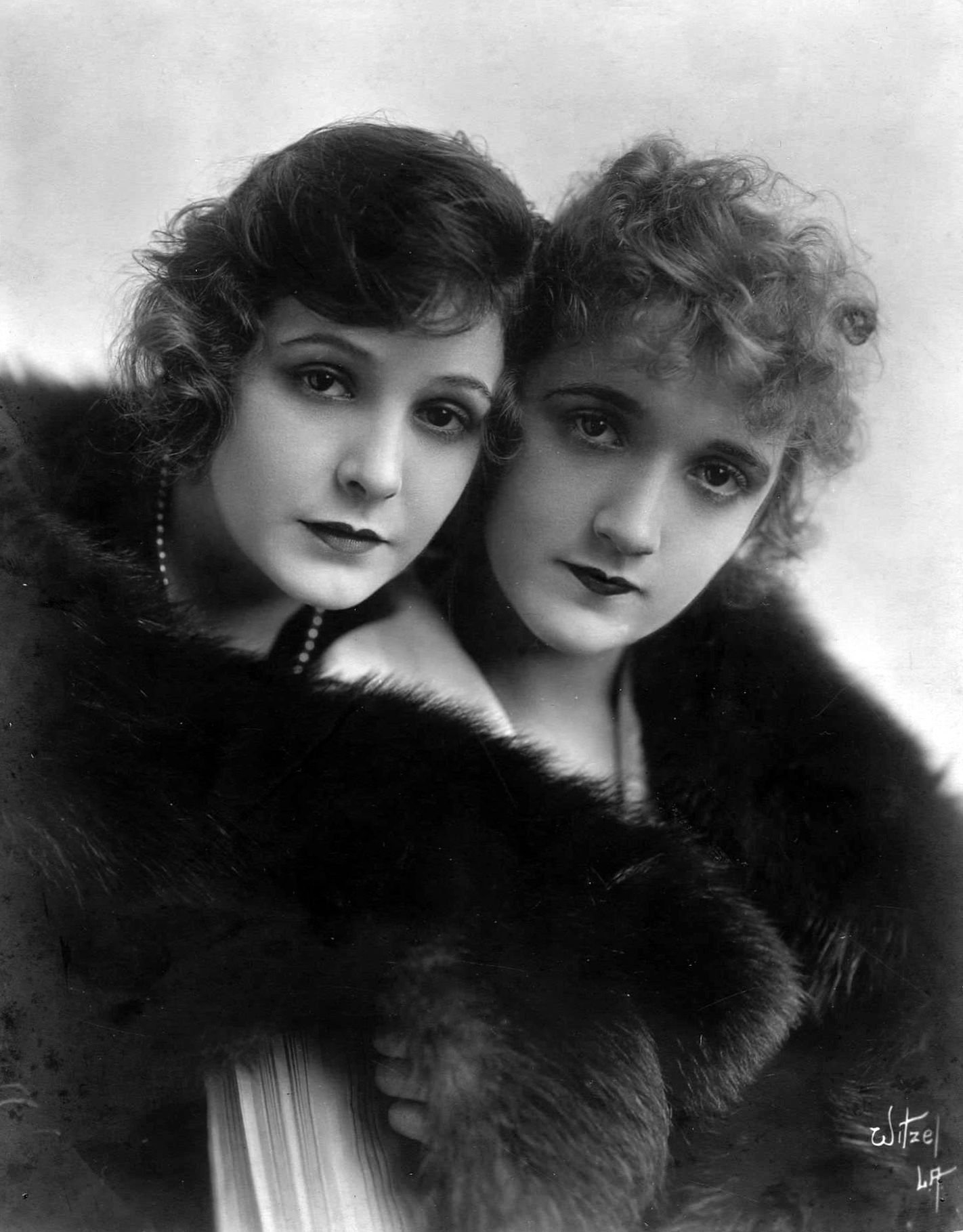
Norma and Constance Talmadge, c. 1920

The girls' childhoods were marked by poverty. One Christmas morning, Fred Talmadge left the house to buy food, and never came back, leaving his wife to raise their three daughters. Peg took in laundry, sold cosmetics, taught painting classes, and rented out rooms, raising her daughters in Brooklyn, New York.

After she told her mother about a classmate from Erasmus Hall High School who modeled for popular illustrated song slides (which were often shown before the one-reeler in movie theaters so the audience could sing along), Mrs. Talmadge decided to locate the photographer. She arranged an interview for her daughter, who after an initial rejection, was soon hired. When they went to the theater to see her debut, Peg resolved to get her into motion pictures.

== Career ==
=== Early films ===
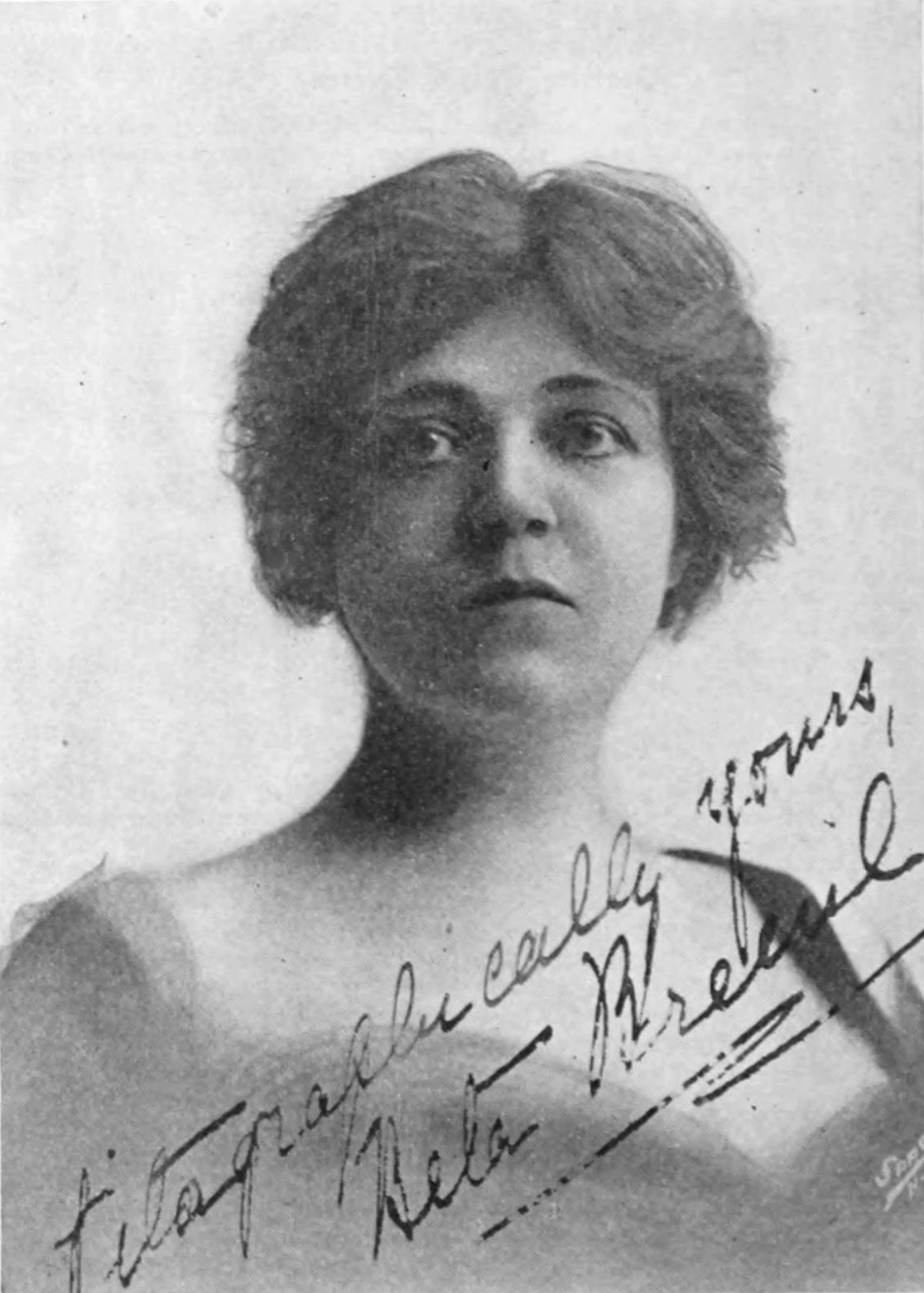
Beta Breuil, scenario editor for Vitagraph Studios, in a photograph published in 1912: The autograph is signed "Vitagraphically yours."

Norma Talmadge was the eldest of the three daughters and the first pushed by their mother to look for a career as a film actress. Mother and daughter traveled to Vitagraph Studios in Flatbush, New York, just a streetcar ride from her home. They managed to get past the studio gates and in to see the casting director, who promptly threw them out. However, scenario editor Beta Breuil, attracted by Talmadge's beauty, arranged a small part for her as a young girl who is kissed under a photographer's cloth in The Household Pest (1909).

Thanks to Breuil's continued patronage, between 1911 and 1912 Talmadge played bit parts in over 100 films. She eventually earned a spot in the stock company at $25 per week and got a steady stream of work. Her first role as a contract actress was 1911's Neighboring Kingdom, with comedian John Bunny. Her first real success came with Vitagraph's three-reel adaptation of A Tale of Two Cities (1911), in which she played the small role of the unnamed seamstress who accompanies Sidney Carton to the guillotine. With help from the studio's major star, Maurice Costello, the star of A Tale of Two Cities, Talmadge's acting improved. She continued to play roles from leads to extras, gaining experience and public exposure in a variety of characters—from a colored mammy to a clumsy waitress to a reckless young modern. She began attracting both public and critical notice. By 1913, she was Vitagraph's most promising young actress. That same year, she was assigned to Van Dyke Brooke's acting unit, and throughout 1913 and 1914, appeared in more films, frequently with Antonio Moreno as her leading man.

In 1915, Talmadge got her big break, starring in Vitagraph's prestigious feature film The Battle Cry of Peace, an anti-German propagandist drama, but ambitious Peg saw that her daughter's potential could carry them further, and got a two-year contract with National Pictures Company for eight features at $400 per week. Talmadge's last film for Vitagraph was The Crown Prince's Double. In the summer of 1915, she left Vitagraph. In the five years she had been with Vitagraph, she made over 250 films.

In August, the Talmadges left for California, where Norma's first role was in Captivating Mary Carstairs. The whole enterprise was a fiasco; the sets and costumes were cheap and the studio itself lacked adequate backing. The film was a flop, and the small new studio shut down after the film's release. The demise of National Pictures Company left the family stranded in California after only one picture. Deciding it was smarter to aim high, they went to Triangle Film Corporation, where D. W. Griffith was supervising productions. On the strength of The Battle Cry, Talmadge got a contract with Griffith's Fine Arts Company. For eight months, she starred in seven features for Triangle, including the comedy The Social Secretary (1916), written by Anita Loos and directed by John Emerson, which gave her an opportunity to disguise her beauty as a girl trying to avoid the unwelcome attentions of her male employers.

=== Norma Talmadge Film Corporation ===
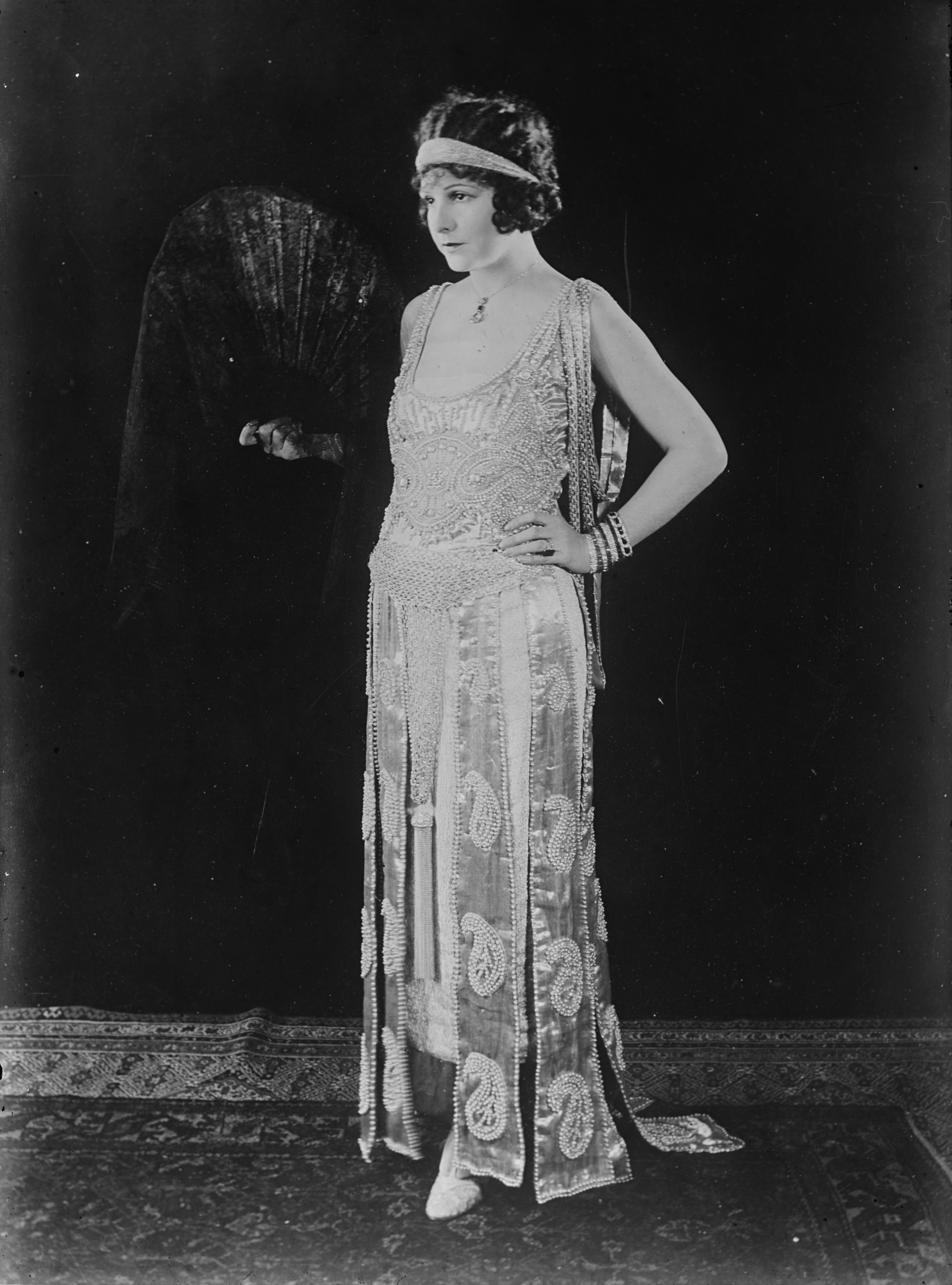
Talmadge, early 1920s

When the contract ran out, the Talmadges returned to New York. At a party, Talmadge met Broadway and film producer Joseph M. Schenck, a wealthy exhibitor who wanted to produce his own films. Immediately taken by Talmadge both personally and professionally, Schenck proposed marriage and a production studio. Two months later, on October 20, 1916, they were married. Talmadge called her much older husband "Daddy". He supervised, controlled, and nurtured her career in alliance with her mother.

In 1917, the couple formed the Norma Talmadge Film Corporation. Schenck vowed he would make his wife "the greatest star of all." Before long, women around the world flocked to her extravagant movies filmed on the East Coast.

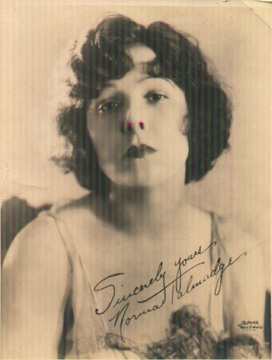
Talmadge, Picture Play magazine, April 1922

Talmadge's first film for her studio, the now lost Panthea (1917), was directed by Allan Dwan with assistants Erich von Stroheim and Arthur Rosson. The film was a dramatic tour de force for her in a story set in Russia of a woman who sacrifices herself to help her husband. The film was a hit, turning Talmadge into a sensation and established her as a first-rate dramatic actress.

Talmadge's acting ability improved rapidly during this period. She made four to six films a year in New York between 1917 and 1921. Under Schenck's personal supervision, other films followed, including Poppy (1917), in which she was paired with Eugene O'Brien. The teaming was such a hit they made 10 more films together, including The Moth and The Secret of the Storm Country, a sequel to Tess of the Storm Country (1914), starring Mary Pickford.

=== Hollywood films ===
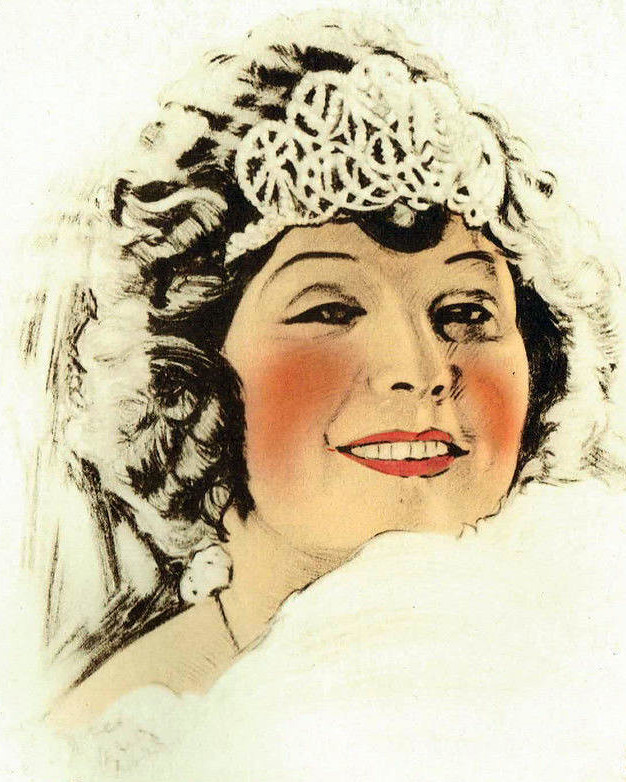
Norma Talmadge art from The Eternal Flame lobby card in 1922

Throughout the 1920s, Talmadge continued to triumph in films such as 1920's Yes or No, The Branded Woman, Passion Flower (1921), and The Sign on the Door (1921). The next year, she had the most popular film of her entire career, Smilin' Through (1922) directed by Sidney Franklin. One of the greatest screen romances of the silent film era, it was remade twice, in 1932 with Norma Shearer, and in 1941 with Jeanette MacDonald.

After Smilin' Through, Schenck closed the New York studios and Norma and Constance moved to Hollywood to join Natalie and her husband, film star Buster Keaton. Talmadge's Hollywood films were different from her New York films. Bigger and glossier, they were fewer but more varied, often with period or exotic settings. She teamed with cinematographer Tony Gaudio and some of Hollywood's finest costume designers for a more glamorous image. She also worked with top-flight directors such as Frank Lloyd, Clarence Brown, and Frank Borzage. With help from films directed by her first husband Joseph M. Schenck, she became one of the highest-paid actresses of the 1920s.

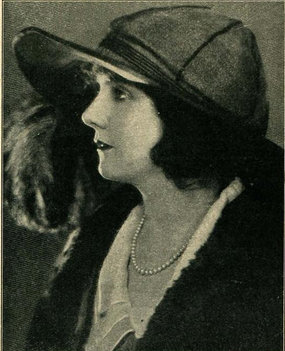
Talmadge, 1923

In 1923, a poll of picture exhibitors named Norma Talmadge the number-one box office star. She was earning $10,000 a week, and receiving as many as 3,000 letters weekly from her fans. Her film Secrets (1924), directed by Frank Borzage, marked the pinnacle of her career, with her giving her best performance and receiving the best reviews. In 1924, Schenck had moved over to head United Artists, but Talmadge still had a distribution contract with First National. She continued to make successful films such as The Lady (1925) directed by Frank Borzage and the romantic comedy Kiki (1926) directed by Clarence Brown, remade later by Mary Pickford as a sound film in 1931.

Talmadge and Anna May Wong turned the first spadeful of earth using a gold-plated shovel at the groundbreaking ceremonies for Grauman's Chinese Theatre on January 5, 1926. The theater's official account also credits Talmadge as having inspired the theater’s tradition of putting footprints in concrete when she accidentally stepped into wet concrete. However, in a short interview during the September 13, 1937, Lux Radio Theatre broadcast of a radio adaptation of A Star Is Born, Sid Grauman related another version of how he got the idea to put hand and foot prints in the concrete. He said it was "pure accident. I walked right into it. While we were building the theatre, I accidentally happened to step in some soft concrete. And there it was. So, I went to Mary Pickford immediately. Mary put her foot into it."

=== Decline ===
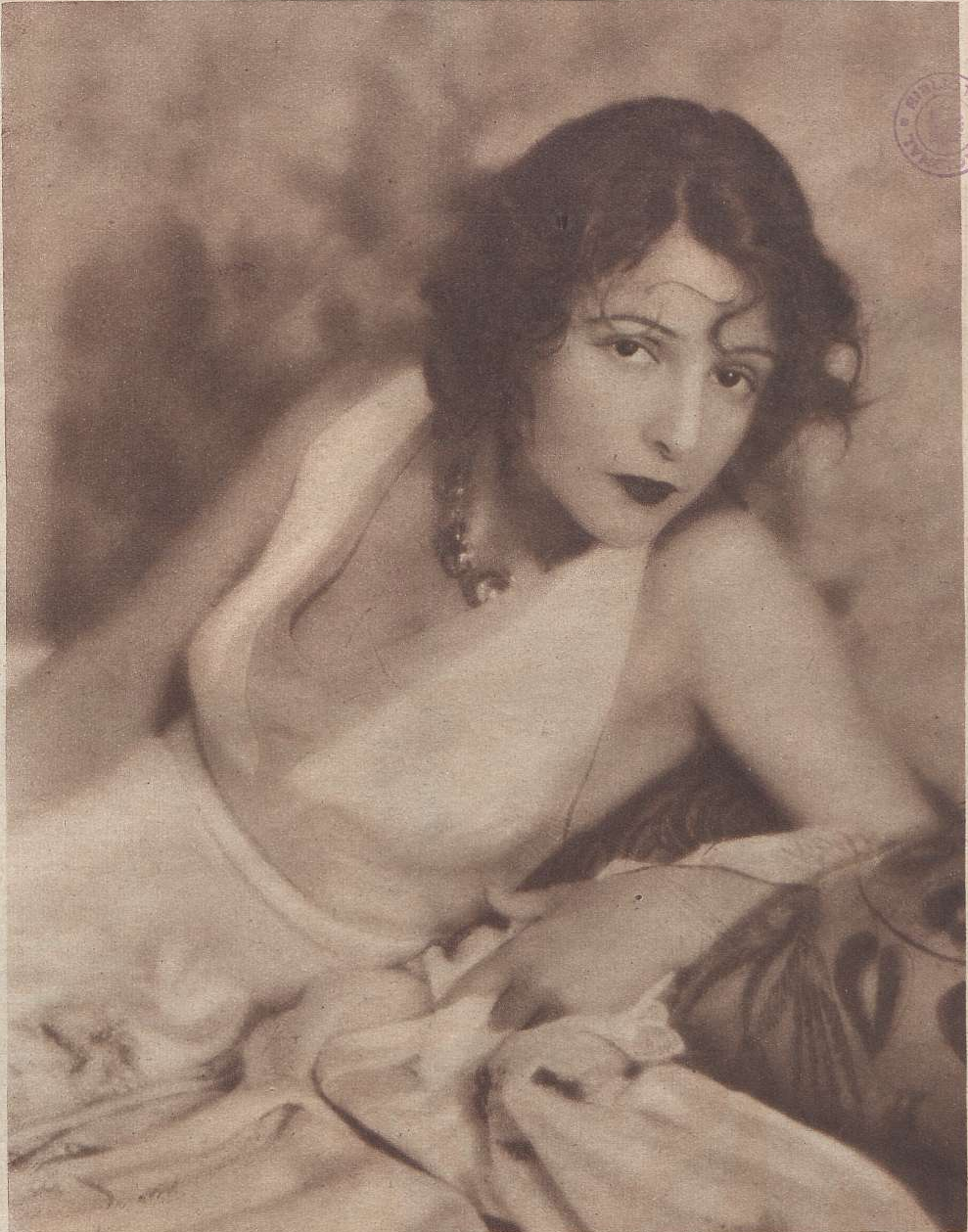
Talmadge, c. 1930

Talmadge's last film for First National was Camille (1927), an adaptation of a novel by Alexandre Dumas the younger later remade by Greta Garbo. During filming, Talmadge fell in love with leading man Gilbert Roland.

She asked Schenck for a divorce, but he was not ready to grant it. Despite his personal feelings, he was not going to break up a moneymaking team and continued casting Roland in Talmadge's next three films released by United Artists. Talmadge and Schenck separated, though he continued producing her films. He was now president of the prestigious but theater-poor United Artists Corporation, and the rest of Talmadge's films were released for that company. UA's distribution problems, however, began to erode her popularity. Her first films for this studio, The Dove (1927) and The Woman Disputed (1928), were box-office failures and ended up being her last silent movies.

By the time Woman Disputed (1928) was released, the talking film revolution had begun, and Talmadge began taking voice lessons in preparation. She worked diligently with voice coaches for over a year so she could make her sound debut. Her first talkie, New York Nights (1929), showed that she could speak and act acceptably in talkies. While her performance was considered to be good, the film was not. Talmadge next took on the role of Madame du Barry in the 1930 film Du Barry, Woman of Passion. With incompetent direction and Talmadge's inexperience at a role requiring very demanding vocal acting, the film was a failure, in spite of the elaborate sets by William Cameron Menzies.

On March 29, 1928, at the bungalow of Mary Pickford, United Artists brought together Talmadge, Pickford, Douglas Fairbanks, Charlie Chaplin, Gloria Swanson, John Barrymore, Dolores del Río, and D.W. Griffith to speak on the radio show The Dodge Brothers Hour to prove that Griffith could meet the challenge of talking movies.

Talmadge's sister Constance sent her a telegram with this advice: "Quit pressing your luck, baby. The critics can't knock those trust funds Mama set up for us". As time passed, it became increasingly clear that the public was no longer interested in its old favorites, and Talmadge was seen as an icon of the past. Talmadge had been increasingly bored with filmmaking before the talkie challenge came along, and this setback seems to have discouraged her from further attempts.

She still had two more films left on her United Artists contract. In late 1930, Samuel Goldwyn announced he had bought the film rights to Zoë Akins' comedy play The Greeks Had a Word for It for her. She reportedly did some stage rehearsals for it in New York, but within a few months, she asked to be released from her contract. She never again appeared on screen. (Goldwyn eventually made the film version of The Greeks Had a Word for It under the title The Greeks Had a Word for Them in 1932.)

== Retirement ==
Upon leaving the movie world, Norma Talmadge rid herself of all the duties and responsibilities of stardom. She told eager fans who were pressing her for an autograph as she left a restaurant, "Get away, dears. I don't need you anymore and you don't need me."

Some time before late 1932, Talmadge decided against marrying Gilbert Roland, as he was 11 years her junior and she feared he would eventually leave her. Mother Peg fell ill, and died in September 1925. In late 1932, Talmadge began seeing her ex-husband Joseph Schenck's poker friend, comedian George Jessel. In April 1934, Schenck, from whom she had been separated for seven years, finally granted Talmadge her divorce, and nine days later, she married Jessel. Schenck continued to do what he could for Norma and her sisters, acting as a financial adviser and guiding her business affairs.

In 1937, Talmadge and Schenck bought the Villa Riviera in Long Beach, California for $1.5 million.

Talmadge's last professional works consisted of appearances on Jessel's radio program, which was sagging in the ratings. The program soon ended, and the marriage did not last; the couple divorced in 1939. Schenck's business acumen and her mother's watchful ambition for her daughters had resulted in a huge fortune for Talmadge, and she never wanted for money. Restless since the end of her filmmaking days, Talmadge traveled, often shuttling between her houses, entertaining, and visiting with her sisters. In 1946, she married Dr. Carvel James, a Beverly Hills physician.

== Later years and death ==
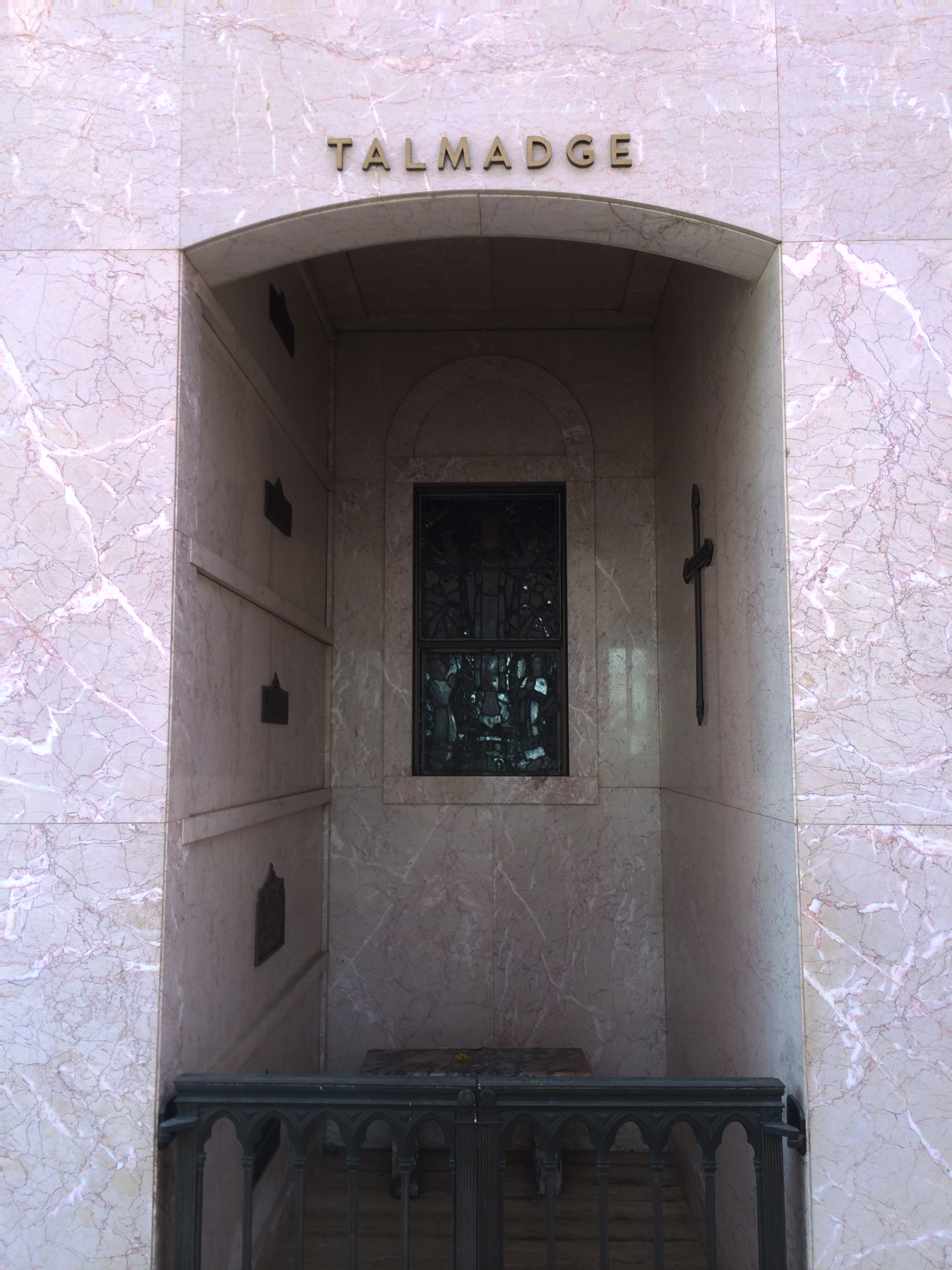
Talmadge's crypt at Hollywood Forever

In her later years, Talmadge, who had never been comfortable with the burdens of public celebrity, became reclusive. Increasingly crippled by painful arthritis and reported to be dependent on painkilling drugs, she moved to the warm climate of Las Vegas for her final years. According to Anita Loos' memories of Talmadge, the drug addiction came first which caused arthritis and was the basis of Norma's interest in her physician husband.

In 1955, along with her one-time brother-in-law Buster Keaton and some ten other renowned movie-industry veterans, Talmadge was invited to be honored with the newly instituted "George" award by George Eastman House at the First Festival of Film Artists in Rochester, NY. But, unfortunately, no one was able to even locate her.

After suffering a series of strokes in 1957, Talmadge died of pneumonia on Christmas Eve of that year. At the time of her death, her estate was valued at more than US$1,000,000 (equivalent to $11.5 million in 2025).

Talmadge Street in the Los Feliz neighborhood of Los Angeles is named in honor of the silent screen star. Also, the community of Talmadge, San Diego is named for her and her sisters, and one of the community's streets is named Norma in her honor.

== In popular culture ==
A New York Times article from March 14, 2010, says that Talmadge

is misremembered, having inspired two unfair caricatures that have lived on in a pair of popular films. In Singin' in the Rain (1952), she is parodied as Lina Lamont ... More malignantly, Billy Wilder used Norma Talmadge as the obvious if unacknowledged source of Norma Desmond, the grotesque, predatory silent movie queen of his 1950 film Sunset Boulevard.

Lina Lamont bears little resemblance to Talmadge's personality either on or off the screen, and, unlike the delusional Desmond, Talmadge was not stuck in the past and had left her stardom behind her with considerable relief.

Talmadge is referenced by name in Woody Allen's film Sweet and Lowdown (1999), in which the Hattie character, played by Samantha Morton, is cast in a silent film as her younger sister, and described by one character as, "...a dead ringer for May Talmadge."

In the 1960 film adaptation of William Inge's The Dark at the Top of the Stairs, young Sonny Flood, the son of Robert Preston's character Rubin Flood, collects pictures of motion picture stars. When he asks his aunt and uncle if they would like to see them, his uncle asks, "Have you got any of Norma Talmadge?" Aunt Lottie (played by Eve Arden) goes on a rant about Talmadge being a Catholic. She says, "Norma Talmadge! Norma Talmadge! That's all I hear, is 'Norma Talmadge'! Maybe you'd like to marry Norma Talmadge some day, and let the Pope tell you what to do with the rest of your life." She "gets even" with Morris, though, when she comments, seeing a picture of Rudolph Valentino, "I think it's a sin for a man to be as pretty as he is. I'd be scared stiff to let a man like him touch me."

== Sources ==
- Basinger, Jeanine (2000). Silent Stars. Wesleyan University Press. ISBN 0-8195-6451-6.
- Loos, Anita (1978). The Talmadge Girls: A Memoir. New York: Viking Press. ISBN 0-670-69302-2.
- Lowe, Denise (2004). An Encyclopedic Dictionary of Women in Early American Films: 1895–1930. Haworth Press. ISBN 0-7890-1843-8.
- Slide, Anthony (2002). Silent Players: A Biographical and Autobiographical Study of 100 Silent Film Actors and Actresses. University Press of Kentucky. ISBN 0-8131-2249-X.
