= Joseph M. Schenck =

Film studio executive (1876–1961)

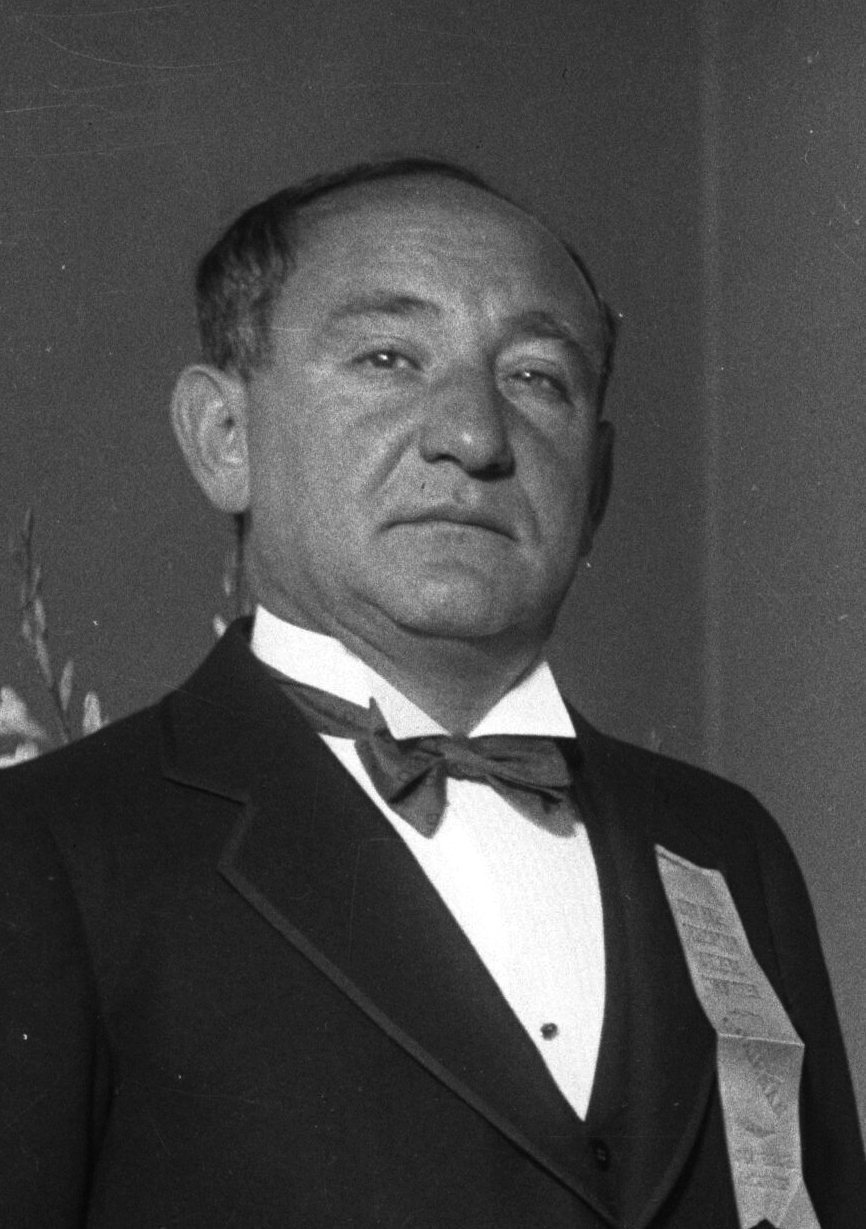
- Schenck in 1928
- Born: Joseph Michael Schenck; December 25, 1876; Rybinsk, Yaroslavl Governorate, Russian Empire
- Died: October 22, 1961 (aged 84); Los Angeles, California, U.S.
- Resting place: Maimonides Cemetery, Brooklyn, New York
- Other name: Ossip Schenker
- Occupation: Film studio executive
- Spouse: Norma Talmadge (m. 1916; div. 1934)
- Relatives: Nicholas Schenck (brother)

Joseph Michael Schenck (Russian: Иосиф Михайлович Шейнкер) (/ˈskɛŋk/; December 25, 1876 – October 22, 1961) was a Russian-born American film studio executive. He was best known as one of the co-founders of film studio 20th Century Fox (now 20th Century Studios) and one of the five founders of the Academy Awards ("The Oscars").

== Life and career ==
Ossip Schencker (Russian: Иосиф Шейнкер; Yiddish: יוסף שענקער) was born to a Jewish family in Rybinsk, Yaroslavl Oblast, Russian Empire. He emigrated to New York City on July 19, 1892, under the name Ossip Schenker; and with his younger brother Nicholas eventually got into the entertainment business, operating concessions at New York's Fort George Amusement Park. Recognizing the potential, in 1909 the Schenck brothers purchased Palisades Amusement Park and afterward became participants in the fledgling motion picture industry in partnership with Marcus Loew, operating a chain of movie theaters.

In 1916, through his involvement in the film business, Joseph Schenck met and married Norma Talmadge, a top young star with Vitagraph Studios. He would be the first of her three husbands, but she was his only wife. Schenck supervised, controlled and nurtured her career in alliance with her mother. In 1917, the couple formed the Norma Talmadge Film Corporation, which became a lucrative enterprise. They divorced in 1934; Schenck then built a home in Palm Springs, California.

After parting ways with his brother, Joseph Schenck moved to the West Coast, where the future of the film industry seemed to lay. Within a few years Schenck became the second president of the new company United Artists.

He was an alternate delegate from California to the 1928 Republican National Convention. Schenck outspokenly opposed the Democratic Party candidate, Upton Sinclair, in the 1934 California gubernatorial election. He threatened to move Twentieth Century-Fox to Florida should Sinclair be elected.

In 1933, he partnered with Darryl F. Zanuck to form Twentieth Century Pictures to produce motion pictures for United Artists, until 20th Century merged with Fox Film in 1935. As chairman of the new 20th Century-Fox, he was one of the most powerful and influential people in the film business.

Caught in a payoff scheme to buy peace with the militant unions, in 1941 Schenck was convicted of tax evasion and sentenced to three years in prison and a $20,000 fine. He was found to have defrauded the government of $189,000 in taxes in 1935 and of $64,000 in 1936. An appeal to the United States Circuit Court of Appeals was unanimously rejected in 1942. He served a total of four months and five days in prison at the United States Correction Institute, before being granted a full presidential pardon from Harry S. Truman in 1945.

Following his release, he returned to 20th Century-Fox, where he became infatuated with the then unknown Marilyn Monroe, and played a key role in launching her career.

== Honors ==
One of the founders of the Academy of Motion Picture Arts and Sciences, in 1952 he was given a special Academy Award in recognition of his contribution to the development of the film industry. He has a star on the Hollywood Walk of Fame at 6757 Hollywood Blvd.

== Death ==
Schenck retired in 1957 and shortly afterwards suffered a stroke, from which he never fully recovered. He died in Los Angeles, California, in 1961 at the age of 84, and was interred in Maimonides Cemetery in Brooklyn, New York.
