= Mr. Moto Takes a Chance =

1938 film by Norman Foster

- Theatrical release poster
- Directed by: Norman Foster
- Written by: Lou Breslow; John Patrick
- Based on: original story by Willis Cooper; Norman Foster characters created by John P. Marquand
- Produced by: Sol M. Wurtzel
- Starring: Peter Lorre; Rochelle Hudson; Robert Kent; J. Edward Bromberg
- Cinematography: Virgil Miller
- Edited by: Nick DeMaggio
- Music by: Samuel Kaylin
- Distributed by: Twentieth Century-Fox
- Release date: June 11, 1938
- Running time: 63 minutes
- Country: United States
- Language: English

Mr. Moto Takes a Chance is the fourth in a series of eight films starring Peter Lorre as Mr. Moto, although it was the second one actually filmed, following Think Fast, Mr. Moto. Its release was delayed until after production of Thank You, Mr. Moto and Mr Moto's Gamble.

The film is based on the character of Mr. Moto created by John P. Marquand, and an original story by Norman Foster and Willis Cooper.

== Plot ==
Over the ruins of Angkor Wat in Cambodia flies the airplane of aviatrix Victoria Mason, supposedly circumnavigating the world. Her actual destination is the kingdom of Tong Moi in French Indochina. Already in Tong Moi, Mr. Moto is posing as an archeologist, and newsreel cameramen Marty Weston and Chick Davis are traveling up the river. Once she is overhead, Mason lights a flare and bails out of her smoking plane which crashes nearby. Rescued by Moto, Mason goes into the village with Bokor the head priest of Shiva. As Weston and Davis arrive at the crash site, Moto has discovered the flare that “caused” the accident.

While trying to film Mason and Tong Moi's ruler, the Rajah Ali, Keema, the Rajah's favorite wife mysteriously dies. Bokor claims that the foreigners and their camera caused her death and they are taken away for a trial. Meanwhile, Moto finds the true cause of Keema's death, a poison dart.

At the temple of Shiva, Weston and Davis are pronounced guilty and are about to be thrown into a pit when an elderly guru appears. The guru impresses Bokor with his ability to charm a snake and to not be burned by a flaming poker. Bokor releases the foreigners at the orders of the guru.

The following day Moto offers to pay the cameramen for images of the interior of the temple. They agree, and return to the temple with Mason. The three are confronted by the elderly guru who tosses their camera down the well. Bokor, seeing this, asks the guru to kill the foreigner, Moto. The guru agrees and returns to the temple, there discovering a concealed ammunition cache. After disposing of a guard, the guru disappears into a secret passageway. There he reveals himself to be Mr. Moto, in disguise.

Moto writes a note saying that he discovered the ammunition and that Bokor is the leader of the revolt. He sends the message off by carrier pigeon but the Rajah kills the bird and intercepts the message. Later at a feast held in honor of the visitors, Moto is served the cooked bird on his plate and the Rajah reveals that he got the message.

In his cabin, Moto is marking the secret ammunition cache on a map of the temple when one of Bokor's men comes in to kill him. After killing the intruder, Moto disguises himself as the assassin and sneaks into the night. Bokor begins searching Moto's cabin but is interrupted by Mason, who finds the hidden map.

Bokor and his men follow Mason to the temple and capture her. The guru appears and pretends to hypnotize the captive. Meanwhile, Weston followed Mason to the temple and tries unsuccessfully to rescue her. Bonfire signals are made and Capt. Zimmerman the gun-runner arrives with Davis, who is taken captive as well. Zimmerman has been selling weapons to Bokor so that Bokor can start a revolution and depose the Rajah Ali. Zimmerman is killed by Yao in “payment” for his services.

When Mason reveals Moto's identity, a fight ensues. Yao is killed and Bokor escapes and rounds up Zimmerman's men. The four inside the temple hold off the men with the weapons that were just delivered. Mason reveals that she is a British Secret Service agent and Moto reveals that he is also a spy. Rajah Ali arrives with his army and rounds up Bokor and his men. The Rajah's plan is to use the weapons Bokor purchased to revolt against the French. As the Rajah prepares to have Moto and the two cameramen executed, Mason distracts him so Moto can threaten to blow up the ammunition cache. The Rajah falls into the cache and the four heroes escape down the secret passage as the temple explodes.

All ends well with Mason and Weston beginning a romance and Davis planning on becoming Moto's assistant. Davis faints when Moto tells him that his next assignment is to capture a murderer living on a volcanic island as the guest of headhunters.

== Cast ==
- Peter Lorre as Mr. Kentaro Moto
- Rochelle Hudson as Victoria Mason
- Robert Kent as Marty Weston
- J. Edward Bromberg as Rajah Ali
- Chick Chandler as Chick Davis
- George Regas as Bokor
- Frederick Vogeding as Capt. Zimmerman
- Gloria Roy as Keema (uncredited)
- Al Kikume as Yao (uncredited)
- James B. Leong as a native (uncredited)

== Production ==
The film was the second filmed in the series and was originally shot under the title Look Out, Mr Moto. Think Fast Mr Moto was filmed in February 1937 and released in August. In June 1937 Fox said the first three movies in the series would be Think Fast, Mr Moto, Thank You Mr Moto and Mr Moto's Gamble.

In July 1937 it was announced Lorre and Rochelle Hudson would be in Look Out Mr Moto.

Filming took place on the Fox backlot July and August 1937, while the "A" picture on the lot was In Old Chicago. Lorre's make up took three hours for some scenes.

Rochelle Hudson and Robert Kent had been romantically teamed on other films such as Angel's Holiday.

== Reception ==
The film did not come out until June 1938.

== Home media ==
This film, along with Think Fast, Mr. Moto, Thank You, Mr. Moto and Mysterious Mr. Moto, was released on DVD in 2006 by 20th Century Fox as part of The Mr. Moto Collection, Volume One.

== See also ==
- Think Fast, Mr. Moto
- Thank You, Mr. Moto
- Mr. Moto's Gamble
- Mysterious Mr. Moto
- Mr. Moto's Last Warning
- Mr. Moto in Danger Island
- Mr. Moto Takes a Vacation
- The Return of Mr. Moto
