= Thank You, Mr. Moto (film) =

- Directed by: Norman Foster
- Written by: Wyllis Cooper; Norman Foster
- Based on: Thank You, Mr. Moto by John P. Marquand
- Produced by: Sol M. Wurtzel
- Starring: Peter Lorre; Thomas Beck; Pauline Frederick; Jayne Regan
- Cinematography: Virgil Miller
- Edited by: Irene Morra; Bernard Herzbrun
- Music by: Samuel Kaylin
- Distributed by: 20th Century Fox
- Release date: December 24, 1937
- Running time: 69 minutes
- Country: United States
- Language: English

Thank You, Mr. Moto is a 1937 American mystery film directed by Norman Foster. It is the second in a series of eight films starring Peter Lorre as Mr. Moto. It was based on the novel of the same name by the detective's creator, John P. Marquand. Mr. Moto battles murderous treasure hunters for priceless ancient scrolls which reveal the location of the long-lost tomb of Genghis Khan.

== Plot ==
A caravan settles for the night in the Gobi Desert. A man sneaks into a tent to steal a scroll, but adventurer and soldier of fortune Kentaro Moto is only pretending to be asleep and kills him. When the caravan reaches Peiping, Moto is searched by the police. The scroll is found, but Moto grabs it and escapes.

He changes clothes and accepts an invitation to a party hosted by Colonel Tchernov in honor of American Eleanor Joyce. At the soirée, Moto observes a guest, Prince Chung leaving his mother to speak privately with Tchernov in another room. Tchernov offers to buy certain family heirloom scrolls from Chung. When Chung refuses to part with them, Tchernov draws a pistol but is killed (off-screen) by Moto. Joyce stumbles upon the scene and watches as Moto stages the death to look like a suicide.

Later, as a favour to his rescuer, Chung grants Moto's request to see the scrolls. Chung informs him that the seven scrolls give directions to the lost grave of Genghis Khan and his treasure. However, one scroll was lent to an exhibition and was stolen.

A dealer in antiquities, Pereira, shows Joyce some wares. She is interested in a (fake) scroll, but the price is too high. While shopping the next day with diplomat Tom Nelson, they see Moto entering Pereira's shop. Moto gets Pereira to confess that he stole the authentic scroll, but before he can obtain more information, Pereira is shot and killed by a gunman in a car which speeds away.

Moto returns to his apartment to find it ransacked. Sensing that the intruder is still present, Moto leaves his gun lying around. Schneider holds him at gunpoint and forces Moto to give him the scroll. When Moto tries to flee, Schneider shoots him with Moto's own gun. However, the gun was filled with blanks and Moto trails Schneider to Madame Tchernov. When they leave to rendezvous with their gang, Moto starts to follow, but is knocked out by the butler, Ivan. Joyce, who had been comforting the widow, is taken hostage.

The arch-villain (and Madame Tchernov's lover), Herr Koerger, forces Prince Chung to reveal the location of the scrolls by striking his mother. As they are leaving, Madame Chung attacks Koerger with a knife and is killed. Meanwhile, Nelson finds and revives Moto. They rush to help Prince Chung, but arrive too late and, feeling dishonored, the Prince commits suicide after they untie him; Moto comforts him before he dies by promising to avenge the Chung family and safeguard the tomb.

The two men track the criminals to a junk. After another attempt to kill him, Moto informs Koerger that the scroll he gave Schneider is a fake. He offers to split Genghis Khan's treasure. Then he sows dissent by telling Madame Tchernov that Koerger is actually in love with Joyce, which the quick-thinking American "confirms". This provides a distraction for Moto to kill Koerger. Then, to the dismay of Joyce and Nelson, Moto burns the scrolls to fulfill his promise to Chung.

== Cast ==
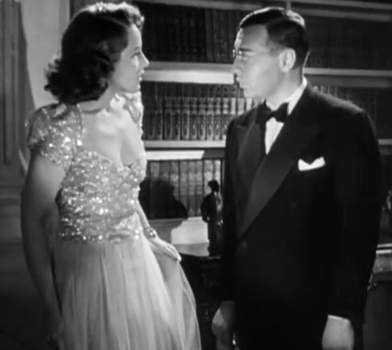
Jayne Regan and Peter Lorre in Thank You, Mr. Moto

- Peter Lorre as Mr. Kentaro Moto
- Thomas Beck as Tom Nelson
- Pauline Frederick as Madame Chung
- Jayne Regan as Eleanor Joyce
- Sidney Blackmer as Herr Koerger
- Sig Rumann as Colonel Tchernov
- John Carradine as Pereira
- Wilhelm von Brincken as Schneider (as William Von Brincken)
- Nedda Harrigan as Madame Tchernov
- Philip Ahn as Prince Chung
- John Bleifer as Ivan
- Gino Corrado as Cavallero Cacciatore(uncredited)
- Victor Sen Yung as Crowd Extra during Acrobat Show(uncredited)
- Victor Wong as Persistent Peddler(uncredited)
- Barbara Jean Wong as Young Girl Acrobat(uncredited)

== Production ==
Thank You, Mr Moto was the second Mr Moto novel following No Exit and was published in 1936 after having been serialised first. The New York Times praised the book's "vitality and vividness".

In June 1937 Fox said the first three movies in the series would be Think Fast, Mr Moto, Thank You Mr Moto and Mr Moto's Gamble. Think Fast had been filmed in February. The second Moto film actually shot was Look Out Mr Moto (which became Mr. Moto Takes a Chance) filmed in July but it would not come out until after the other three films.

Jayne Regan was given her first lead when cast in the film.

=== Shooting ===
Filming started October 1937 and went through to November.

The film marked the last appearance of screen great Pauline Frederick.

By now the films were so popular that in December 1937 Fox refused Lorre a leave of absence to appear on Broadway in Wine of Choice with Miriam Hopkins.

In December 1937 the Alfred Cohn story Death at the Artist's Ball was purchased by Fox as a Moto story.

== Reception ==
20th Century Fox released the film in December 1937. The Christian Science Monitor called it "well made and fairly exciting."

== Home media ==
This film, together with Think Fast, Mr. Moto, Mr. Moto Takes a Chance and Mysterious Mr. Moto, was released on DVD in 2006 by 20th Century Fox as part of The Mr. Moto Collection, Volume One.

== See also ==
- Mr. Moto's Last Warning
- Mr. Moto in Danger Island
- Mr. Moto Takes a Vacation
- The Return of Mr. Moto
