= Brian Coburn =

Brian Coburn may refer to:

- Brian Coburn (politician), Canadian politician
- Brian Coburn (actor), British actor
