= Mysterious Mr. Moto =

1938 film by Norman Foster

- Theatrical release poster
- Directed by: Norman Foster
- Screenplay by: Philip MacDonald; Norman Foster
- Based on: Mr. Moto novel series by John P. Marquand
- Produced by: Sol M. Wurtzel
- Starring: Peter Lorre; Mary Maguire; Henry Wilcoxon; Erik Rhodes
- Cinematography: Virgil Miller
- Edited by: Norman Colbert
- Music by: Samuel Kaylin
- Distributed by: Twentieth Century-Fox
- Release date: September 1938
- Running time: 63 minutes
- Country: United States
- Language: English

Mysterious Mr. Moto, produced in 1938 by Twentieth Century Fox, is the fifth in a series of eight films starring Peter Lorre as Mr. Moto.

The film is based on the character of Mr. Moto created by John P. Marquand, from an original screenplay by Philip MacDonald and Norman Foster.

It was originally known as Mysterious Mr. Moto of Devil's Island.

== Plot ==
A daring escape is made from the French penal colony on Devil's Island by Mr. Moto, pretending to be Ito Matsuka, a Japanese murderer, and Paul Brissac, who belongs to a group of assassins. Brissac changes his name to Romero when they arrive in London and Moto stays on as his houseboy.

Moto then uncovers a plot to assassinate pacifist industrialist Anton Darvak.Darvak has invented a new steel manufacture process that he refuses to use for purposes of war and making munitions. DEspite the worries of his personal secretary Ann Richman,he shrugs off the threats---even after a close friend of his is run over and killed by a truck as a warning to co-operate.

Moto pays a visit to Scotland Yard and Inspector Charles Murchison,but only to announce his presence in London and ask for no interference. Scotland Yard attempts to have Moto followed,with very little success.

A rowdy working class pub is the designated meeting spot for The League Of Assassins to conduct business---even to the point where street musicians have "code songs" to play. Moto has planted Lotus Liu there as his undercover operative, and she has won the trust of George Higgins by assisting him in minor smuggling sidelines.

But when Higgins becomes lovesick and talks too much,the League has him murdered;using a pub brawl as cover. Moto hastily evacuates Lotus, assuming her cover has been compromised.

Moto's own cover has been blown, but he easily eludes four assassins in the London fog.He hides out in Scotland yard until morning, then reports his progress.

David Scott--Frensham is Darvak's "trusted" business associate, and apparently a harmless fop. But Moto senses that as one of the few people who knows Darvak's every movement, he must be considered a suspect.

At an art gallery,Moto maneuvers Frensham into position to be killed by his own death trap meant for Darvak. The remaining assassin,Brissac,is captured by Moto after a brutal fight.

== Cast ==
- Peter Lorre as Mr. Kentaro Moto
- Mary Maguire as Ann Richman
- Henry Wilcoxon as Anton Darvak
- Erik Rhodes as David Scott-Frensham
- Harold Huber as Ernst Litmar
- Leon Ames as Paul Brissac (alias Romero)
- Forrester Harvey as George Higgins
- Fredrik Vogeding as Gottfried Brujo
- Lester Matthews as Sir Charles Murchison
- John Rogers as Sniffy
- Karen Sorrell as Lotus Liu
- Val Stanton as Organ Grinder (uncredited)
- Ernie Stanton as Sidewalk Artist (uncredited)

== Production ==
Henry Wilcoxon replaced Michael Whalen in the cast. It was an early Hollywood role for Australian actor Mary Maguire.

Filming took place in March and April 1938, shortly after completion of Mr Moto's Gamble.

During filming Peter Lorre, as Moto, impersonated a seventy-year-old German painter.

== Reception ==
The film was released in May 1938. The Los Angeles Times praised the "exciting action". It arrived in New York in September.

== Home media ==
This film, along with Think Fast, Mr. Moto, Thank You, Mr. Moto and Mr. Moto Takes a Chance, was released on DVD in 2006 by 20th Century Fox as part of The Mr. Moto Collection, Volume One.

== See also ==
- Think Fast, Mr. Moto
- Thank You, Mr. Moto
- Mr. Moto's Gamble
- Mr. Moto Takes a Chance
- Mr. Moto's Last Warning
- Mr. Moto in Danger Island
- Mr. Moto Takes a Vacation
- The Return of Mr. Moto
