= Lancer Spy =

1937 film

- Directed by: Gregory Ratoff
- Written by: Philip Dunne
- Based on: novel by Marthe McKenna
- Produced by: Samuel G. Engel executive Darryl F. Zanuck
- Starring: Dolores del Río; George Sanders; Peter Lorre; Virginia Field; Sig Ruman
- Cinematography: Barney McGill
- Edited by: Louis R. Loeffler
- Music by: Arthur Lange
- Production company: 20th Century Fox
- Distributed by: 20th Century Fox
- Release date: October 8, 1937
- Running time: 78 minutes
- Country: United States
- Language: English

Lancer Spy is a 1937 American thriller film directed by Gregory Ratoff and starring Dolores Del Rio and George Sanders. Its plot concerns an Englishman who impersonates a German officer and a female German spy who falls in love with him.

== Plot ==
Lt. Michael Bruce, a British WW1 naval officer is found to be the doppelganger of a captured German prisoner, Imperial Lancer Guard Officer Baron Kurt von Rohback. Bruce is recruited to fake an escape and return to Germany as Rohback. His mission while in Berlin is to gain knowledge of the secret Western Front plans. He returns to Berlin with much fanfare concocted by high official Gen. Von Meinhardt in order to make him a war hero, and is able to socialize in the highest German circles. He is suspected of being a spy by Imperial Intelligence officer Lt. Col. Gottfried Hollen who sends a dancer/spy to investigate. She falls in love with him and helps facilitate his escape after Hollen cohort Maj. Sigfried Gruning finds out his real identity. Able to gain last minute access to the Western Front plans by the sudden death of Gen. Von Meinhardt, Lt. Bruce makes a successful escape to the Swiss border after a chase by the German military police.

== Cast ==
- Dolores del Río as Dolores Daria Sunnel
- George Sanders as Baron Kurt von Rohback and Lt. Michael Bruce
- Peter Lorre as Maj. Sigfried Gruning
- Virginia Field as Joan Bruce
- Sig Ruman as Lt. Col. Gottfried Hollen
- Joseph Schildkraut as Prince Ferdi zu Schwarzwald
- Maurice Moscovitch as Gen. von Meinhardt
- Lionel Atwill as Col. Fenwick
- Luther Adler as Schratt
- Fritz Feld as Fritz Mueller
- Lester Matthews as Capt. Neville
- Carlos De Valdez as Von Klingen
- Gregory Gaye as Capt. Freymann
- Claude King as Captain

== Production ==
Lancer Spy was based on a story written by Marthe McKenna, a Belgian woman who was a spy for England during World War I. She had previously written the 1932 memoir I Was a Spy, the basis of a 1933 film of the same title.

Gregory Ratoff signed a contract with 20th Century Fox to write, produce and direct. The film was originally to star Michael Whalen in the part that was eventually played by George Sanders.

French actor Germaine Aussey was to have made her American debut in the film but was replaced by Dolores del Río soon after filming began in May 1937.

Peter Lorre was cast after his success in Think Fast, Mr Moto. Fox bought his contract from the Gaumont-British Picture Corporation.

Colin Clive, who had been cast in the film, collapsed during filming and died.
