= No Limit (1931 film) =

1931 film

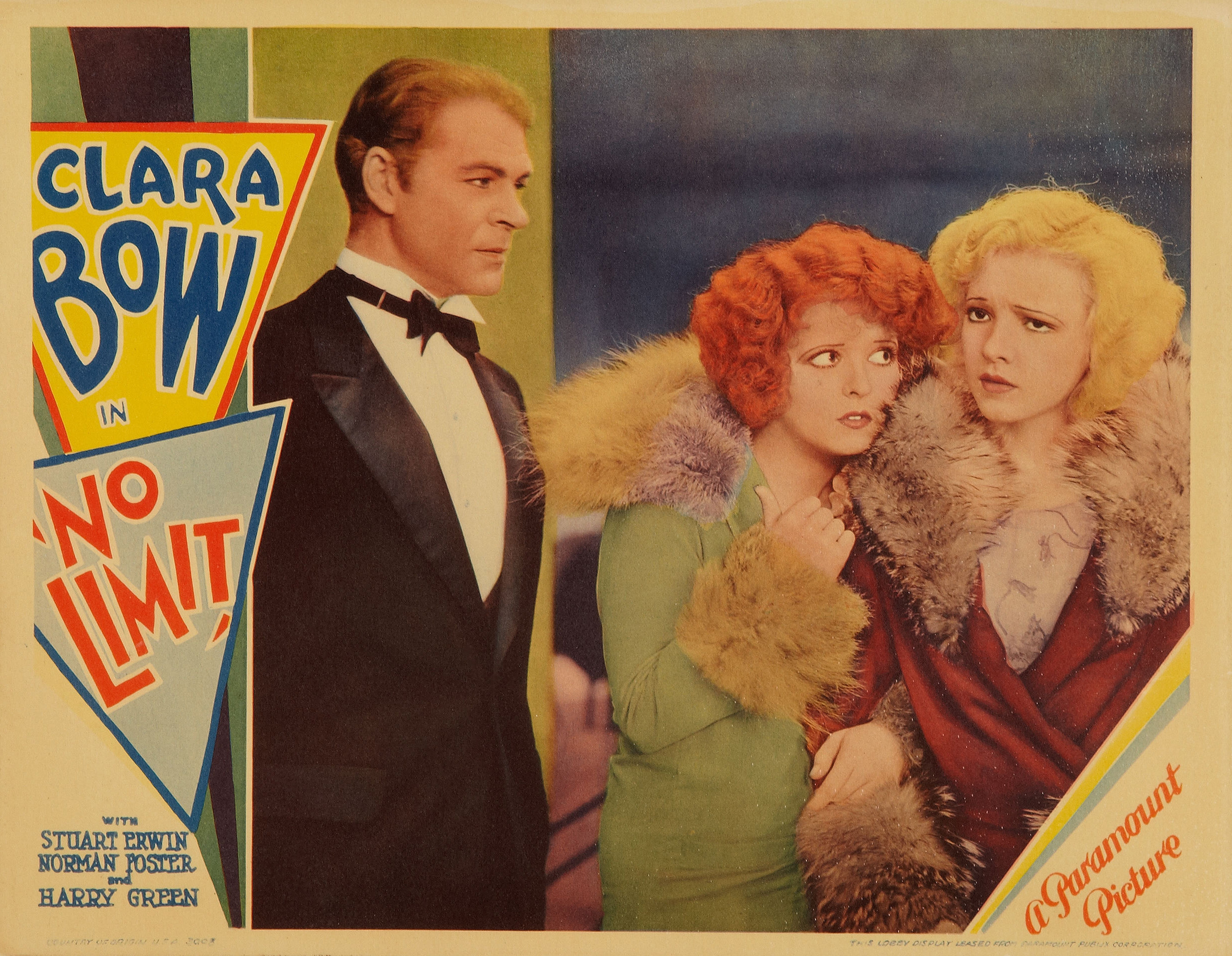
- Lobby card
- Directed by: Frank Tuttle
- Screenplay by: Viola Brothers Shore; Salisbury Field
- Story by: George Marion Jr.
- Produced by: B. P. Schulberg
- Starring: Clara Bow; Norman Foster; Stuart Erwin
- Cinematography: Victor Milner
- Distributed by: Paramount Pictures
- Release date: January 16, 1931
- Running time: 72 min.
- Country: United States
- Language: English

No Limit is a 1931 American pre-Code comedy film directed by Frank Tuttle and starring Clara Bow, Norman Foster, Stuart Erwin, Thelma Todd, Dixie Lee, and Mischa Auer.

== Plot ==
The film tells the story of Helen "Bunny" O'Day, an usherette working in a theater, who accidentally finds herself living in a private gambling den. She begins a romance with a hulking gambler.

== Cast ==
- Clara Bow as Helen "Bunny" O'Day
- Norman Foster as Douglas Thayer
- Stuart Erwin as Ole Olson
- Dixie Lee as Dotty 'Dodo' Potter
- Harry Green as Maxie Mindil
- Thelma Todd as Betty Royce
- Kenne Duncan as Curly Andrews
- Mischa Auer as Romeo
- Maurice Black as Happy
- G. Pat Collins as Charlie
- William B. Davidson as Wilkie
- Frank Hagney as Battling Hannon
- Allan Cavan as Board Member (uncredited)
- Robert Greig as Doorman (uncredited)
- Lee Phelps as Ticket Taker (uncredited)
- Syd Saylor as Reporter (uncredited)

== Censorship ==
The film was banned in several cities in California and Texas in response to Clara Bow's off-screen reputation for promiscuity and other 'unladylike' behaviour.
