= Mr. Moto's Gamble =

1938 film by James Tinling

- Directed by: James Tinling
- Written by: Charles Belden; Jerry Cady
- Based on: characters created by John P. Marquand
- Produced by: John Stone; Sol M. Wurtzel (uncredited)
- Starring: Peter Lorre; Keye Luke; Lynn Bari
- Cinematography: Lucien Andriot
- Edited by: Nick DeMaggio
- Production company: 20th Century Fox
- Distributed by: 20th Century Fox
- Release date: April 7, 1938
- Running time: 72 minutes
- Country: United States
- Language: English

Mr. Moto's Gamble is the third film in the Mr. Moto series starring Peter Lorre as the title character. It is best remembered for originating as a movie in the Charlie Chan series and being changed to a Mr. Moto entry at the last minute.

== Plot ==
In San Francisco, policeman Lieutenant Riggs (Harold Huber) takes Mr. Moto, a detective and Lee Chan (Keye Luke), a student, to a prizefight between Bill Steele (Dick Baldwin) and Frank Stanton (Russ Clark), where the winner will take on the champion, Biff Moran (Ward Bond). However, the fight is fixed and gangster Nick Crowder (Douglas Fowley) bets big money that Stanton won't make it to the fifth round. He goes down in the fourth and dies shortly afterward.

Bookie Clipper McCoy (Bernard Nedell) loses a fortune. Moto proves that it was murder and it is revealed that $100,000 was won in bets around the country against Stanton. Moto works with Lt. Riggs to solve the murder as the championship fight looms.

Comedy is provided by Horace Wellington (Maxie Rosenbloom), a kleptomaniac, and Lee Chan. Moto promised to reveal the murderer's identity on the night of the big fight, but the murderer has plans, too, with a concealed gun, to kill Moto.

== Cast ==
- Peter Lorre as Mr. Moto
- Keye Luke as Lee Chan
- Dick Baldwin as Bill Steele
- Lynn Bari as Penny Kendall
- Douglas Fowley as Nick Crowder
- Jayne Regan as Linda Benton
- Harold Huber as Lieutenant Riggs
- Maxie Rosenbloom as Horace Wellington
- John Hamilton as Philip Benton
- George E. Stone as Jerry Connors
- Bernard Nedell as Clipper McCoy
- Charles Williams as Gabby Marden
- Ward Bond as Biff Moran
- Lon Chaney Jr. as Joey
- Paul Fix as Gangster
- Adrian Morris as Policeman
- Pierre Watkin as District Attorney
- Olin Howland as Deputy Sheriff Burt (uncredited)
- Gladden James as Cashier (uncredited)
- Lester Dorr as Reporter (uncredited)

== Production ==
In June 1937, Fox said the first three movies in the Mr Moto series would be Think Fast, Mr. Moto; Thank You, Mr. Moto; and Mr. Moto's Gamble. At the same time, the studio announced three Charlie Chan movies starring Warner Oland: Charlie Chan on Broadway, Charlie Chan at College and Charlie Chan in Radio City.

In July, Fox said Rochelle Hudson would be in Mr. Moto's Gamble. This was changed to Look Out, Mr. Moto, which eventually became Mr. Moto Takes a Chance.

=== Charlie Chan at Ringside ===
Fox was going to make a Charlie Chan film, Charlie Chan at Ringside, starring Warner Oland as Chan and Keye Luke as Number One Son. Jayne Regan was cast on the strength of her performance in Thank You, Mr Moto. The cast would also include Lynn Bari and be directed by James Tinling.

Filming began in January 1938, but Oland left the film due to illness and the production was suspended. In March 1938, Fox announced Oland would return to the role and appear in Charlie Chan on the Clipper Ship. However, he never recovered from his illness and died in August 1938. Sidney Toler took over the role of Charlie Chan in the ongoing film series.

Fox had already spent an estimated $100,000 on the film when shooting had to be called off. Wanting to salvage something and reluctant to cast a different actor as Charlie Chan, Sol Wurtzel, head of Fox's B movie unit, had the script rewritten as a Mr. Moto movie.

Two Charlie Chan regulars appeared in the film – Keye Luke, who plays Charlie Chan's son Lee, and Harold Huber, who plays Lt Riggs. Lee Chan is Moto's student in his criminology class at San Francisco University. Moto mentions he has heard from Charlie Chan in Honolulu. Moto says he and the head of the homicide squad are mere amateurs compared to Charlie Chan.

Filming recommenced in January 1938. Lon Chaney Jr. had a small role. Filming finished late March 1938, the fourth movie shot in the Moto series.

== Release ==
The film was released relatively quickly in April 1938.

The New York Times liked the fight sequences but called it "an otherwise unexciting film".

The next film shot in the series would be Mysterious Mr. Moto.

== Home media ==
This film, along with Mr. Moto in Danger Island, Mr. Moto's Last Warning, Mr. Moto Takes a Vacation and (as a DVD extra) The Return of Mr. Moto, was released on DVD in 2007 by 20th Century Fox as part of The Mr. Moto Collection, Volume Two.

== See also ==
- Think Fast, Mr. Moto
- Thank You, Mr. Moto
- Mr. Moto Takes a Chance
- Mysterious Mr. Moto
- Mr. Moto's Last Warning
- Mr. Moto in Danger Island
- Mr. Moto Takes a Vacation
- The Return of Mr. Moto
