= Charlie Chan at Treasure Island =

1939 film by Norman Foster

- Directed by: Norman Foster
- Written by: John Larkin
- Produced by: Edward Kaufman
- Starring: Sidney Toler, Cesar Romero
- Cinematography: Virgil Miller
- Edited by: Norman Colbert
- Music by: Samuel Kaylin
- Production company: 20th Century Fox
- Distributed by: 20th Century Fox
- Release date: August 31, 1939
- Running time: 74 minutes
- Country: United States
- Language: English

Charlie Chan at Treasure Island is a 1939 American film directed by Norman Foster, starring Sidney Toler as the fictional Chinese-American detective Charlie Chan, that takes place on Treasure Island during San Francisco's Golden Gate International Exposition (1939–1940).

== Plot ==
Charlie and Jimmy Chan are traveling by plane to San Francisco. Jimmy befriends insurance executive Thomas Gregory. Charlie's friend, novelist Paul Essex, dies aboard the aircraft after receiving a radiogram warning him not to ignore "Zodiac". His briefcase mysteriously disappears. Charlie meets with Deputy Police Chief J.J. Kilvaine, and runs into reporter and old friend Peter Lewis. Charlie also meets noted local magician Fred Rhadini, and discusses Essex's death with the three men. Rhadini tells Charlie about Dr. Zodiac, a psychic preying on the rich in San Francisco. Charlie, Rhadini, and Lewis go to Dr. Zodiac's home, where Dr. Zodiac conducts an eerie séance. Lewis' fiancée, Eve Cairo, has been meeting with Dr. Zodiac, angering Lewis. Later, Kilvaine reveals that Essex was poisoned, but can't rule out suicide. Jimmy spends the afternoon following Thomas Gregory, whom he believes stole Essex's briefcase when leaving the plane. He discovers Essex's manuscript in Gregory's hotel room.

That night, Charlie attends Rhadini's magic show at the Golden Gate International Exposition on Treasure Island. Rhadini's clumsy, comic acquaintance, Elmer Kelner, is helping to serve food and drink at the club. Charlie meets Eve Cairo and socialite Bessie Sibley, as well as Rhadini's jealous wife, Myra. During her telepathy act with Fred Rhadini, Eve comes into contact with someone thinking about murder and Charlie is almost killed when a knife is thrown at him.

After the show, Charlie, followed by Rhadini and Lewis, break into Dr. Zodiac's home. They find Jimmy already there. Charlie discovers evidence that Zodiac is a fraud. When Zodiac's Turkish houseman, Abdul, arrives, Charlie searches him and finds the holster that fits the knife. Abdul escapes, and the burglars discover Zodiac's vast files which he uses to frighten and blackmail others. Charlie realizes Bessie Sibley is providing information on others to protect herself, and that Zodiac was blackmailing Essex. Charlie burns Zodiac's office to protect the innocent.

Essex's manuscript is a fictional account of Dr. Zodiac's blackmail scheme, and the next morning Charlie finds that the last page revealing how the murder was committed is missing. Charlie meets with Gregory, who says he is an insurance company detective investigating mysterious suicides. Charlie believes Gregory's claim is false, and Gregory fails to steal the manuscript back. Charlie believes Dr. Zodiac suffers from pseudologia fantastica, and Rhadini challenges Dr. Zodiac to a public test of psychic skills. Dr. Zodiac accepts the claim by leaving a note on the front door of the Temple of Magic where Rhadini performs. It's written on the back side of the missing manuscript page. The manuscript mentions a pygmy arrow; a similar arrow from a display in the foyer of the Temple of Magic is missing.

That night, Charlie, Jimmy, Bessie Sibley, Myra Rhadini, and Peter Lewis attend Rhadini's magic show, where he is assisted by Eve Cairo and Elmer Kelner. Dr. Zodiac appears during the show, and is invited on stage. As Rhadini performs a levitation trick, Zodiac is killed with the pygmy arrow. Dr. Zodiac is revealed to be Abdul. Although a bow is found, it is too brittle to have fired the arrow. Zodiac must have been stabbed with the arrow. Gregory gives Rhadini an alibi after discovering Rhadini's wand in the aisle by his seat. Kilvaine reveals that Gregory is Stewart Salsbury, and that he really is an insurance company executive.

At Kilvaine's suggestion, the murder is re-enacted with Lewis standing in for Zodiac. The secret of Rhadini's levitation trick is revealed, and Rhadini is stabbed in the aisle during the act. Myra uses the "sphinx"—an upright metal pseudo-Egyptian coffin with a hidden elevator in its floor—to go from the stage to the below-stage area, where her husband's dressing room is located. Charlie encourages Eve to try to tap into the mind of the killer. Eve reads Charlie's thoughts, which describe the motivations of Stella Essex, Bessie Sibley, Thomas Gregory, Peter Lewis, Fred Rhadini, and Myra Rhadinia (although without mentioning their names). The mind of Dr. Zodiac interferes with Eve's mind. Eve reads Zodiac's mind, and discovers that the real Dr. Zodiac killed Abdul because only Abdul knew Dr. Zodiac's real identity.

The killer attempts to shoot Eve while she is on stage, but Jimmy spots the pistol and pushes the gun away just in time. Dr. Zodiac is revealed to be Fred Rhadini. While all eyes were on Eve, he sneaked into the wings, ran below the stage, and used the elevator in the sphinx to re-emerge on stage and attempt to kill Eve. Charlie reveals that Rhadini used a wand with a spring trigger to fire the arrow that killed Abdul. He then stabbed himself to divert attention from himself as a suspect.

== Cast ==
- Sidney Toler as Charlie Chan
- Victor Sen Yung as Jimmy Chan
- Cesar Romero as Fred Rhadini
- Douglas Fowley as Peter Lewis
- Pauline Moore as Eve Cairo
- Donald MacBride as Deputy Police Chief J.J. Kilvaine
- Wally Vernon as Elmer Kelner
- Billie Seward as Bessie Sibley
- Louis Jean Heydt as Paul Essex
- Sally Blane as Stella Essex
- June Gale as Myra Rhadini
- Douglass Dumbrille as Stewart Salsbury, alias Thomas Gregory
- Trevor Bardette as Abdul
- Gerald Mohr as Dr. Zodiac (uncredited)

== Critical reception ==
A contemporary review of the film in The New York Times by Frank Nugent noted that "Chan stakes out members of his supporting cast and brings 'em back dead. By this simple process of elimination he usually gets his murderer," and speculated that "unless Twentieth Century-Fox soon decides to put a halt to Charlie Chan's activities, there won't be a supporting cast left intact in all Hollywood." Film critic Stuart Galbraith IV described the film in DVD Talk as "entertaining if totally preposterous and hopelessly Byzantine," but that it is "certainly one of the most entertaining of the Toler-era Chans, this despite a screenplay by John Larkin that literally makes no sense whatsoever."

== Possible cultural influence ==
Charlie Chan at Treasure Island may have influenced the Zodiac Killer. In the movie, there is a character called "Dr. Zodiac" who is found after a telegram to Charlie Chan warning about the danger of "Zodiac". In the telegram that provided the clue, the astrological symbol Scorpio is mentioned. Scorpio is the nom de guerre used in messages sent by the serial killer in the movie Dirty Harry, who was inspired by the Zodiac Killer case.
