= Virginia Field =

British actress (1917–1992)

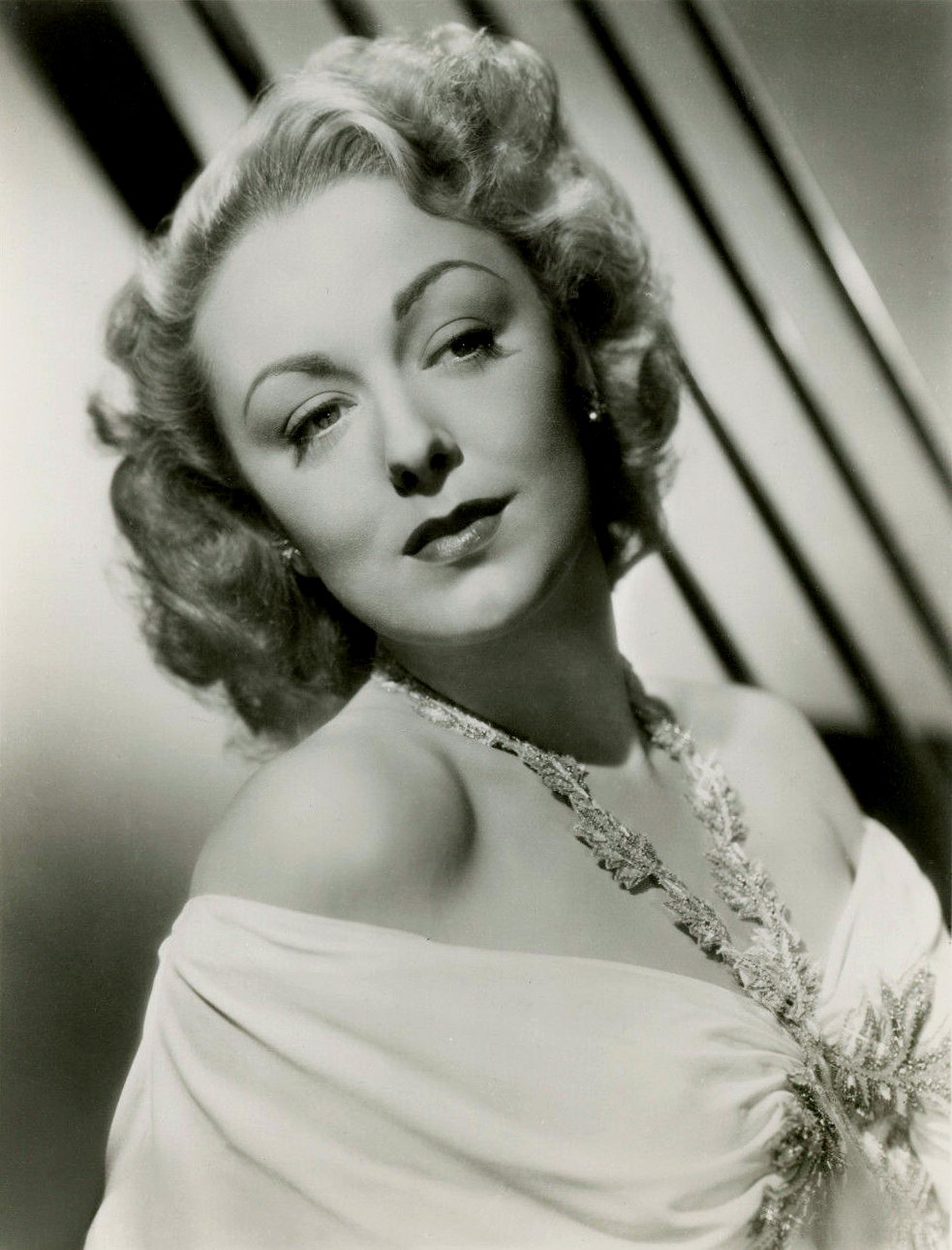
- Field in the 1940s
- Born: Margaret St. John Field; 4 November 1917; London, England
- Died: 2 January 1992 (aged 74); Palm Desert, California, US
- Occupation: Actress
- Years active: 1934–1965
- Spouses: Paul Douglas (m. 1942; div. 1946); Howard Grode (m. 1947; div. 1948); Willard Parker (m. 1951)
- Children: 2
- Relatives: Auriol Lee (aunt)

Virginia Field (born Margaret St. John Field (sometimes mis-transcribed Margaret Cynthia Field); 4 November 1917 – 2 January 1992) was a British-born film actress.

== Early years ==
Virginia was an only child, born in London. Her father was Sir John Field, the judge of Leicester County Court Circuit. Her mother Esme Katherine Lee was a cousin of Confederate General Robert E. Lee, and her aunt was British stage actress and director Auriol Lee.

She was educated in Paris, Vienna, and the South of France, and then returned to England, where she studied for the stage. In Vienna, she acted for Max Reinhardt, and on returning to Britain, she was given her first film role whilst in her teens in The Lady Is Willing, followed by a Hollywood contract.

== Film ==
Field went to the US to appear in David O. Selznick's Little Lord Fauntleroy (1936). In the late 1930s, she appeared in various parts in 20th Century Fox's Mr. Moto film series. Field played Kitty, a ballerina with Vivien Leigh in the 1940 film, Waterloo Bridge. In 1941, Field played Nell Gwyn in Hudson's Bay. Vincent Price was cast as King Charles II, and he wrote about the experience in his book The Book of Joe. "...I came up against my first animals, a whole litter of King Charles spaniels... But my competition was not the spaniels, who were indeed adorable, but the enormous bosoms of the young lady who played Nell Gwyn. They were of such robust and luscious proportions and her dress so low cut that in our big scene, in which we fondled the puppies on a great bed, she leaned over them so far that the censors cut the scene out of the picture."

== Television ==
During the Perry Mason series on CBS from 1957 to 1966, Field made six guest appearances. She played Irene Collaro in the 1958 episode "The Case of the Prodigal Parent". In both the 1960 episode, "The Case of the Provocative Protege", and the 1962 episode, "The Case of the Polka Dot Pony", she played the murderer. She played a widow trying to communicate with the spirit of her late son in the 1961 episode "The Case of the Meddling Medium." In the 1964 episode, "The Case of the Simple Simon", Field played the role of Mason's client and defendant Ramona Carver. She also appeared as Lotta Langley in an episode of the ABC series The Rebel, starring Nick Adams.

Field was a regular participant on Pantomime Quiz, and had the role of Josephine Dunning in the pilot for Meet the Girls, a comedy aired on CBS in August 1960.

== Recognition ==
Field has a star at 1751 Vine Street, Los Angeles on the Hollywood Walk of Fame, dedicated 8 February 1960.

== Marriages ==
Field married three times. Her spouses included actors Paul Douglas and Willard Parker. Douglas and she had a daughter, Margaret Field Douglas. In 1947, she married Howard Grode, a composer and musician.

== Death ==
Field died of cancer on 2 January 1992. She was cremated and her ashes scattered at sea.

== Filmography ==
- The Primrose Path (1934) – Ianthe Dorland
- The Lady Is Willing (1934) – Maid (uncredited)
- Little Lord Fauntleroy (1936) – Miss Herbert
- Sing, Baby, Sing (1936) – Farraday's Nurse (uncredited)
- Thank You, Jeeves! (1936) – Marjorie Lowman
- Ladies in Love (1936) – Countess Helena
- Lloyd's of London (1936) – Polly
- Career Woman (1936) – Fifi Brown
- Think Fast, Mr. Moto (1937) – Gloria Danton
- London by Night (1937) – Bessie
- Lancer Spy (1937) – Joan Bruce
- Ali Baba Goes to Town (1937) – Dinah
- Charlie Chan at Monte Carlo (1937) – Evelyn Grey
- Mr. Moto's Last Warning (1939) – Connie
- Bridal Suite (1939) – Abbie Bragdon
- Captain Fury (1939) – Mabel
- The Sun Never Sets (1939) – Phyllis
- Mr. Moto Takes a Vacation (1939) – Eleanore Kirke
- Eternally Yours (1939) – Lola De Vere
- The Cisco Kid and the Lady (1939) – Billie Graham
- Waterloo Bridge (1940) – Kitty
- Dance, Girl, Dance (1940) – Elinor Harris
- Hudson's Bay (1941) – Nell Gwyn
- Knockout (1941) – Gloria Van Ness
- Singapore Woman (1941) – Claire Weston
- Atlantic Convoy (1942) – Lida Adams
- The Crystal Ball (1943) – Jo Ainsley
- Stage Door Canteen (1943) – Herself
- Ladies' Man (1947) – Gladys Hayden
- The Perfect Marriage (1947) – Gloria
- The Imperfect Lady (1947) – Rose Bridges
- Repeat Performance (1947) – Paula Costello
- Variety Girl (1947) – Variety Girl
- Christmas Eve (1947) – Claire
- Dream Girl (1948) – Miriam Allerton Lucas
- John Loves Mary (1949) – Lilly Herbish
- A Connecticut Yankee in King Arthur's Court (1949) – Morgan Le Fay
- Dial 1119 (1950) – Freddy
- The Lady Pays Off (1951) – Kay Stoddard
- Week-End with Father (1951) – Phyllis Reynolds
- The Veils of Bagdad (1953) – Rosanna
- Appointment with a Shadow (1957) – Florence Knapp
- Rockabilly Baby (1957) – Eleanor Carter aka Dixie West
- The Explosive Generation (1961) – Mrs. Katie Sommers
- The Earth Dies Screaming (1964) – Peggy Hatton
