= The Crime of Doctor Hallet =

1938 film by S. Sylvan Simon

- Theatrical release poster
- Directed by: S. Sylvan Simon
- Screenplay by: Lester Cole; Brown Holmes
- Story by: Lester Cole; Carl Dreher
- Produced by: Edmund Grainger
- Starring: Ralph Bellamy; Josephine Hutchinson; William Gargan; Barbara Read; John 'Dusty' King; Charles Stevens
- Cinematography: Milton Krasner
- Edited by: Philip Cahn (uncredited)
- Production company: Universal Pictures
- Distributed by: Universal Pictures
- Release date: March 11, 1938
- Running time: 68 minutes
- Country: United States
- Language: English
- Budget: $130,000

The Crime of Doctor Hallet is a 1938 American drama film, directed by S. Sylvan Simon and starring Ralph Bellamy, Josephine Hutchinson, William Gargan, Barbara Read, John 'Dusty' King, and Charles Stevens. The film was released by Universal Pictures on March 11, 1938.

== Plot ==
Doctor Hallet is working in the jungle with his wife to find the cure to the red fever, when another doctor comes to be a guinea pig for them, since he doesn't believe in Doctor Hallet's work, the men ends up dying and Doctor Hallet takes his identity and tries to finish the dead man's job.

== Cast ==
- Ralph Bellamy as Dr. Paul Hallet
- Josephine Hutchinson as Dr. Mary Reynolds
- William Gargan as Dr. Jack Murray
- Barbara Read as Claire Saunders
- John 'Dusty' King as Dr. Philip Saunders (as John King)
- Charles Stevens as Talamu
- Honorable Wu as Molugi
- Nella Walker as Mrs. Carpenter
- Eleanor Hansen as Anna
- Constance Moore as Susan
- Brandon Beach as Party Guest (uncredited)
- John Dawson as Photographer (uncredited)
- Jack Egan as Party Guest (uncredited)
- Allen Fox as Pilot (uncredited)
- Ben Lewis as Reporter (uncredited)
- William Lundigan as Party Guest (uncredited)
- Frances Robinson as Party Guest (uncredited)
- Larry Steers as Party Guest (uncredited)
- Marilyn Stuart as Party Guest (uncredited)
- Bud Wolfe as Party Guest (uncredited)
