= Norman Foster (director) =

American film director and actor (1903–1976)

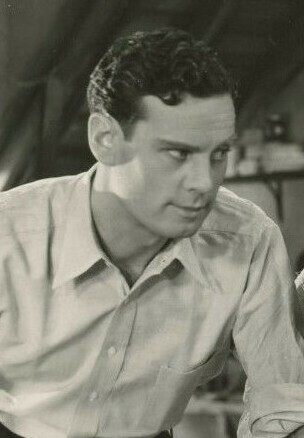
- Foster in Rafter Romance (1933)
- Born: Norman Foster Hoeffer; December 13, 1903; Richmond, Indiana, U.S.
- Died: July 7, 1976 (aged 72); Santa Monica, California, U.S.
- Resting place: Holy Cross Cemetery
- Occupations: Director; screenwriter; actor
- Years active: 1926–1976
- Spouses: Claudette Colbert (m. 1928; div. 1935) Sally Blane (m. 1935)
- Children: 2

Norman Foster (born Norman Foster Hoeffer; December 13, 1903 – July 7, 1976) was an American film director, screenwriter and actor. He directed many Charlie Chan and Mr. Moto films as well as projects for Orson Welles and Walt Disney. As an actor he was a leading man in early talkies and also appeared in Welles' final film, The Other Side of the Wind.

== Life and career ==
Norman Foster was born Norman Foster Hoeffer on December 13, 1903, in Richmond, Indiana. He became a cub reporter on a local newspaper in Indiana before going to New York in the hopes of getting a better newspaper job but there were no vacancies.

He tried a number of theatrical agencies before getting stage work including The Barker (1927, New York; 1928, London) in which he appeared opposite future wife Claudette Colbert.

He later appeared on Broadway in the George S. Kaufman/Ring Lardner play June Moon in 1929. He began working in crowd scenes in films before moving to bigger parts.

Foster wrote several plays. He gave up acting in the late 1930s to pursue directing, although he occasionally appeared in movies and television programs. Foster directed a number of Charlie Chan and Mr. Moto mysteries, including Charlie Chan in Panama (1940), Charlie Chan at Treasure Island (1939), Mr. Moto Takes a Vacation (1939), Charlie Chan in Reno (1939), Mr. Moto's Last Warning (1939), Mysterious Mr. Moto (1938), Mr. Moto Takes a Chance (1938), Thank You, Mr. Moto (1937), and Think Fast, Mr. Moto (1937). He co-wrote and directed the "My Friend Bonito" segment of Orson Welles's unfinished Pan-American anthology film It's All True (1941).

Initially engaged as a second-unit director who would film background material, Foster came to do much more and the quality of his work would have been recognized with a co-director credit on the film. A co-production of RKO Pictures and the Office of the Coordinator of Inter-American Affairs, the non-commercial project was later terminated by RKO.

As Welles prepared to go to Brazil to film the Rio Carnival for It's All True, he temporarily suspended "Bonito" (for which filming was never completed) so Foster could return to Hollywood to direct Journey into Fear (1943). Welles played a small on-screen role in the Mercury Production, and denied that he took over direction of the film himself.

Some of Foster's other directorial efforts include Kiss the Blood off My Hands (1948), Rachel and the Stranger (1948), Woman on the Run (1950) and The Sign of Zorro (1958). He directed the Davy Crockett segments of the Walt Disney anthology television series Disneyland that were edited into the feature films Davy Crockett, King of the Wild Frontier (1955) and Davy Crockett and the River Pirates (1956). Foster's second verse of his lyrics to Disney's Zorro theme song which was "He is polite, but the wicked take flight, when they catch the sight of Zorro. He's friend of the weak, and the poor, and the meek, this very unique Senor Zorro." never aired on the television series. This version of the Zorro Theme including these verses was performed by The Chordettes. These verses later appeared in the Disney Sing-Along Songs version of the Zorro Theme in its 1987 direct-to-video episode, "Heigh-Ho".

== Personal life ==
In 1928, Foster secretly married Claudette Colbert in London. Concerned about the reaction of Colbert's mother to their union, they continued to keep their marriage a secret from her, even to the point of living apart.

In 1935, they divorced, and Foster in October that same year married actress Sally Blane, sister of actress Loretta Young. They had two children: Gretchen (named for Loretta Young, whose birth name was Gretchen) and Robert.

== Theatre credits ==
Date	Title	Role	Notes
September 14 – November 1926	Just Life	Dick Fellows	Henry Miller's Theatre, New York
October 20 – November 1926	Sure Fire	Philip Cole	Waldorf Theatre, New York
January 18 – July 1927	The Barker	Chris Miller	Biltmore Theatre, New York
November 22, 1927 – March 1928	The Racket	Dave Ames	Ambassador Theatre, New York
September 12 – December 1928	Night Hostess	Rags Conway	Martin Beck Theatre, New York
November 1 – December 1928	Tin Pan Alley	Fred Moran	Biltmore Theatre, New York
April 24 – May 11, 1929	Carnival	Bobbie Spencer	Forrest Theatre, New York
October 9, 1929 – June 4, 1930	June Moon	Fred M. Stevens	Broadhurst Theatre, New York
December 31, 1930 – January 1931	Savage Rhythm		Writer (with Harry Hamilton); John Golden Theatre, New York

== Film and television credits ==
=== Actor ===
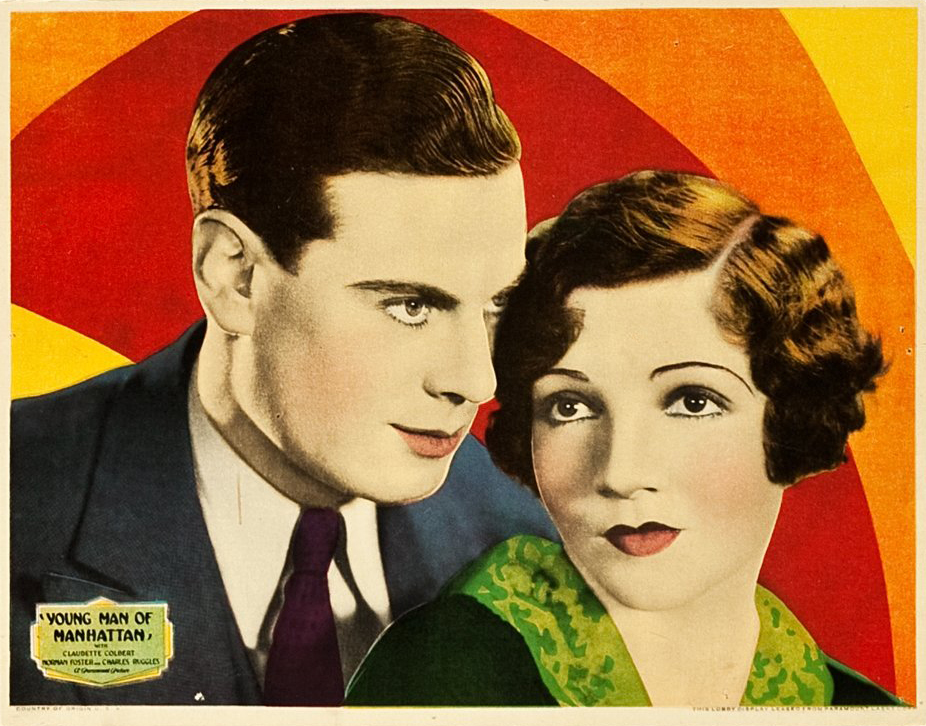
Norman Foster and Claudette Colbert in Young Man of Manhattan (1930)

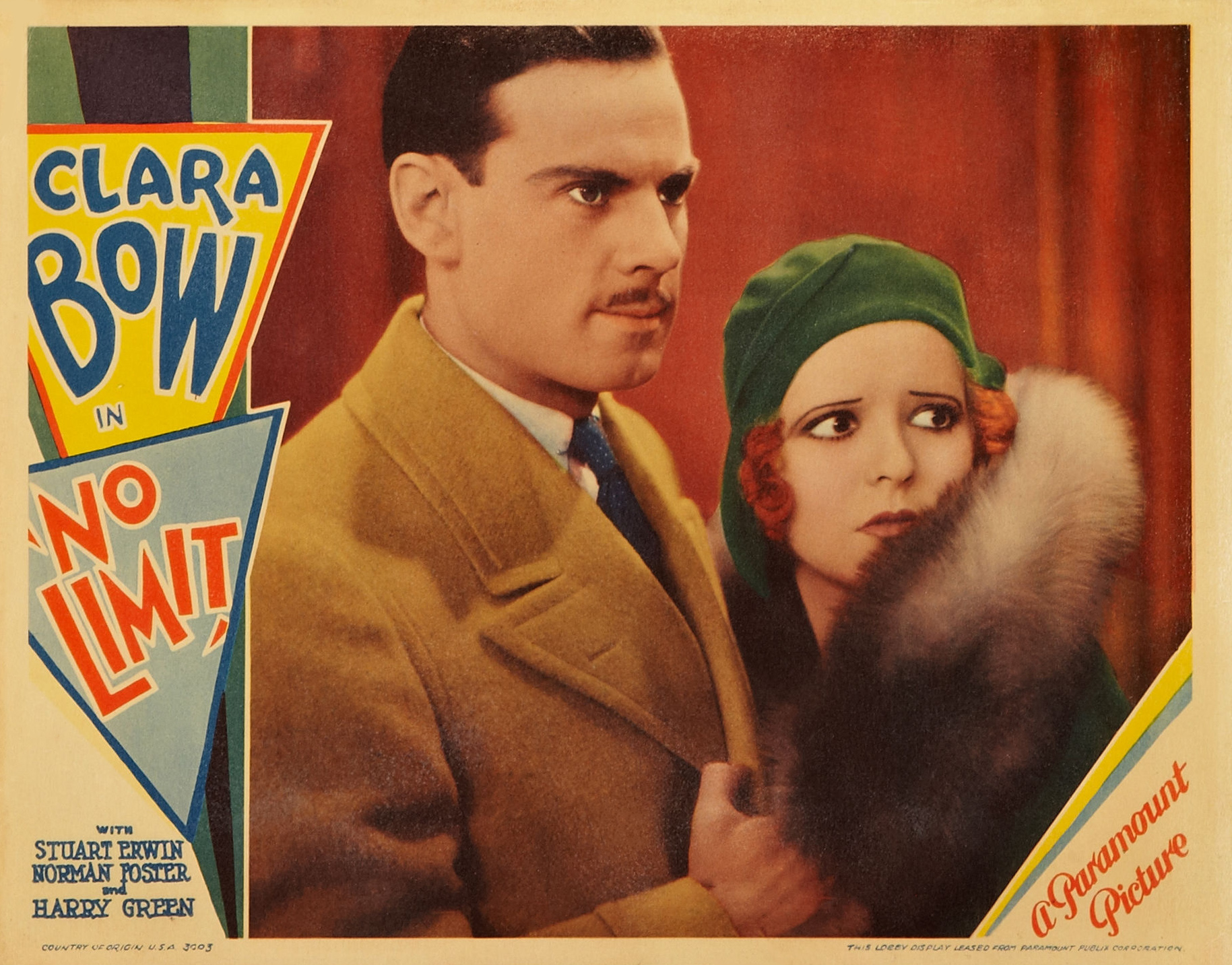
Norman Foster and Clara Bow in No Limit (1931)

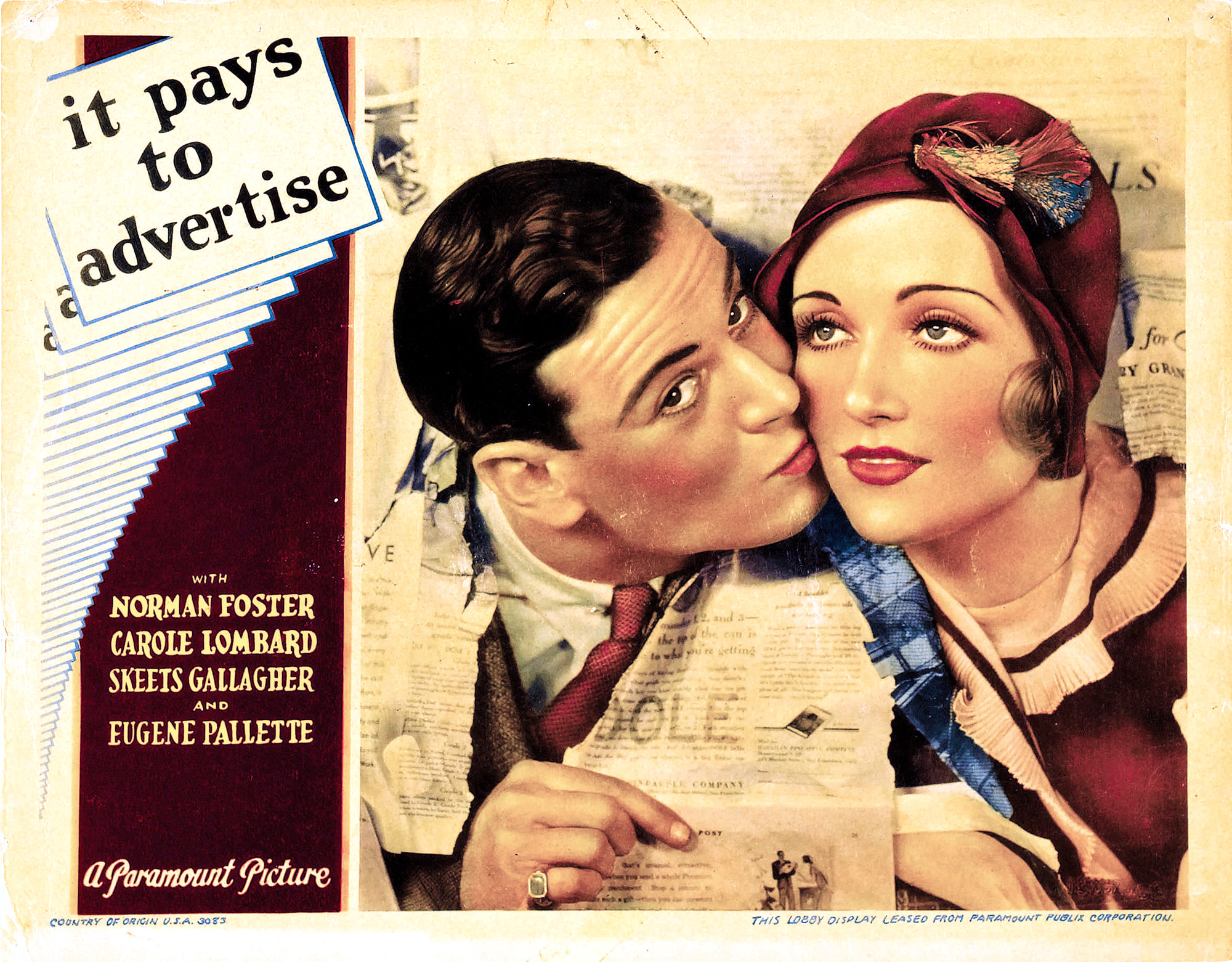
Norman Foster and Carole Lombard in It Pays to Advertise (1931)

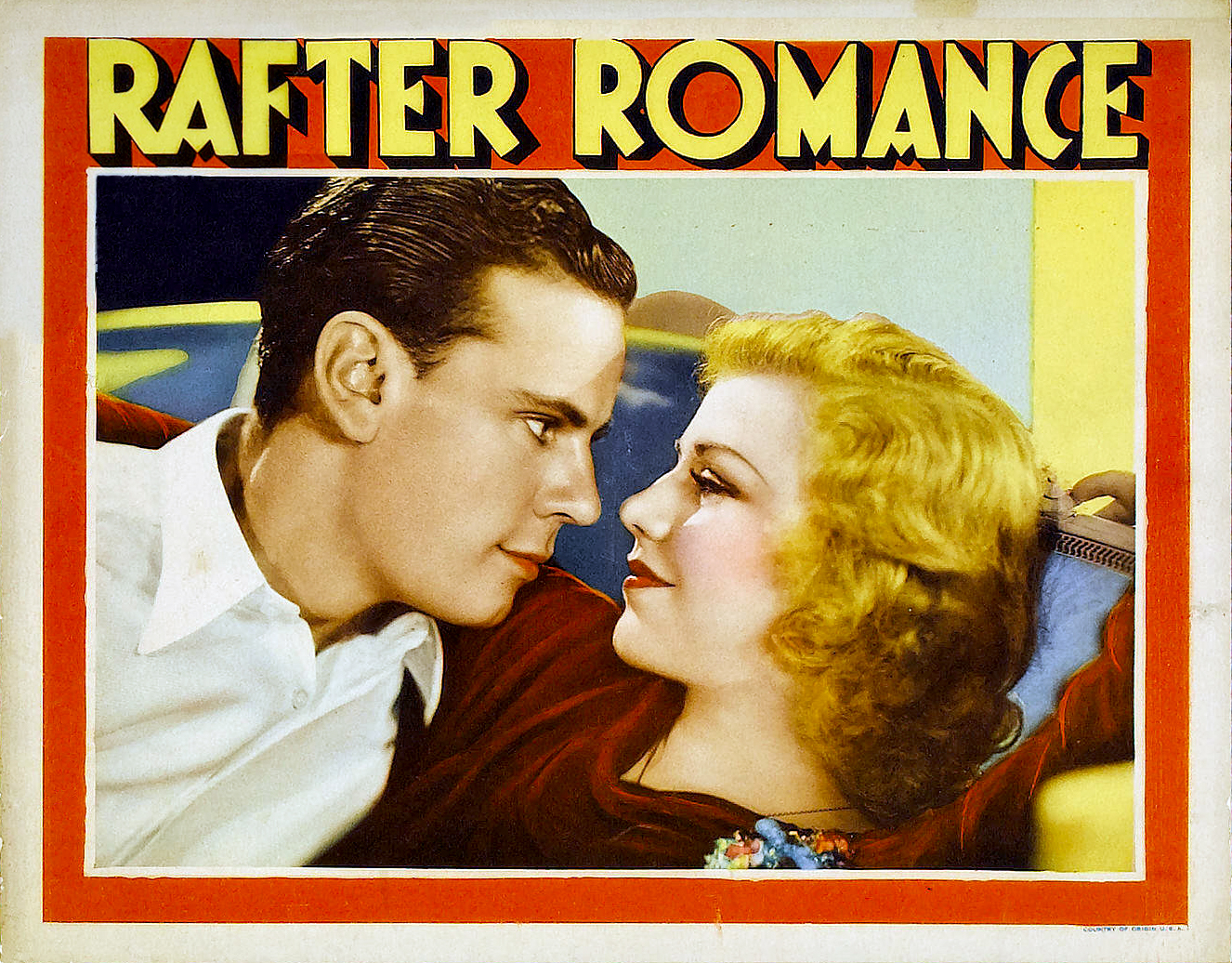
Norman Foster and Ginger Rogers in Rafter Romance (1933)

Year	Title	Role	Notes
1929	Gentlemen of the Press	Ted Hanley	
1929	Love at First Sight	Richard Norton	
1930	Young Man of Manhattan	Toby McLean	
1931	No Limit	Douglas Thayer	
1931	It Pays to Advertise	Rodney Martin	
1931	Men Call It Love	Jack Mills	
1931	Up Pops the Devil	Steve Merrick	
1931	Confessions of a Co-Ed	Hal	
1931	Reckless Living	Doggie	
1931	Under Eighteen	Alf	
1932	Girl of the Rio	Johnny Powell	
1932	Play Girl	Wallie Dennis	
1932	Steady Company	Jim	
1932	Alias the Doctor	Stephan Brenner	
1932	The Cohens and Kellys in Hollywood	Melville Cohen	
1932	Week-End Marriage	Ken Hays	
1932	Skyscraper Souls	Tom	
1932	Strange Justice	Wally Baker	
1932	Prosperity	John Warren	
1933	State Fair	Wayne Frake	
1933	Professional Sweetheart	Jim Davey	
1933	Pilgrimage	Jim Jessop	
1933	Rafter Romance	Jack Bacon	
1933	Walls of Gold	Barnes Ritchie	
1934	Orient Express	Carlton Myatt	
1934	Strictly Dynamite	Nick Montgomery	
1934	Elinor Norton	Bill Carroll	
1935	Behind the Evidence	Tony Sheridan	
1935	Behind the Green Lights	Dave Britten	
1935	The Hoosier Schoolmaster	Ralph Hartsook	
1935	Ladies Crave Excitement	Dan Phelan	
1935	Super Speed	Randy Rogers	
1935	The Bishop Misbehaves	Donald Meadows	
1935	Escape from Devil's Island	Andre Dion	
1935	The Fire Trap	Bill Farnsworth	
1935	Suicide Squad	Larry Parker	
1936	The Leavenworth Case	Bob Gryce	
1936	Everybody's Old Man	Ronald Franklin	
1936	Fatal Lady	Philip Roberts	
1936	High Tension	Eddie Mitchell	
1936	I Cover Chinatown	Eddie Barton	
1938	Mysterious Mr. Moto	Hoodlum in tavern	uncredited
2018	The Other Side of the Wind	Billy Boyle	filmed in 1974, not released until 2018

=== Director ===
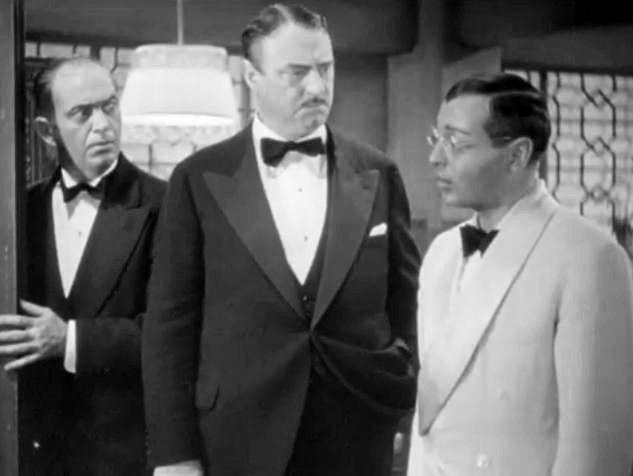
George Cooper, Sig Ruman and Peter Lorre in Think Fast, Mr. Moto (1937)

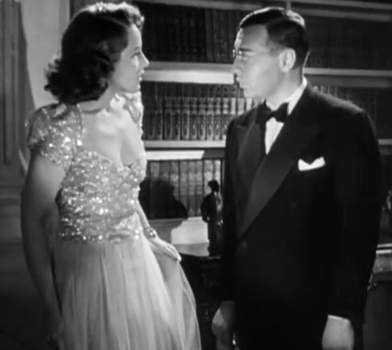
Jayne Regan and Peter Lorre in Thank You, Mr. Moto (1937)

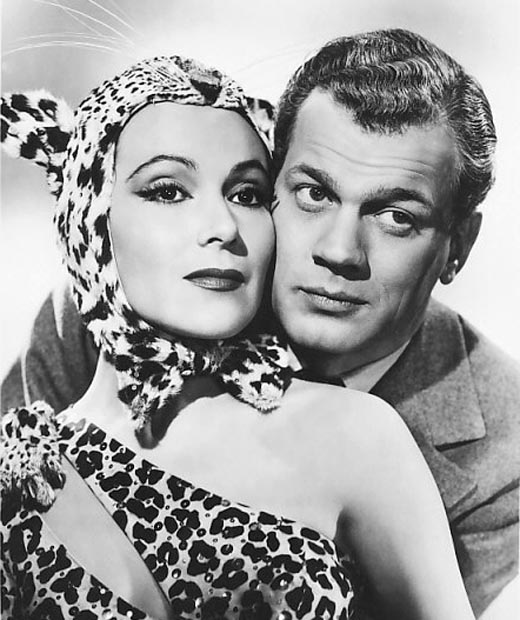
Promotional photo of Dolores del Río and Joseph Cotten for Journey into Fear (1943)

Year	Title	Notes
1936	I Cover Chinatown	
1937	Fair Warning	Also screenwriter
1937	Think Fast, Mr. Moto	Also screenwriter
1937	Thank You, Mr. Moto	Also screenwriter
1938	Walking Down Broadway	
1938	Mr. Moto Takes a Chance	Also screenwriter
1938	Mysterious Mr. Moto	Also screenwriter
1939	Mr. Moto's Last Warning	Also screenwriter
1939	Charlie Chan in Reno	
1939	Mr. Moto Takes a Vacation	Also screenwriter
1939	Charlie Chan at Treasure Island	
1939	20,000 Men a Year	Second unit director, uncredited
1940	High School	Additional director (uncredited)
1940	Northwest Passage	Second unit director, uncredited
1940	Charlie Chan in Panama	
1940	Viva Cisco Kid	
1940	Maryland	Second unit director, uncredited
1941	Ride, Kelly, Ride	
1941	Scotland Yard	
1941	It's All True	Segment "My Friend Bonito"; Also screenwriter; unfinished film
1943	Journey into Fear	
1943	Santa	
1944	The Escape	Also screenwriter
1945	The Hour of Truth	Also screenwriter
1946	El ahijado de la muerte	Also screenwriter
1948	Rachel and the Stranger	
1948	Kiss the Blood Off My Hands	
1949	Tell It to the Judge	
1950	Father Is a Bachelor	
1950	Woman on the Run	Also screenwriter
1952	Navajo	Also screenwriter
1952	Sky Full of Moon	Also screenwriter
1953	Sombrero	Also screenwriter
1955	Davy Crockett, King of the Wild Frontier	Edited from the Davy Crockett miniseries
1956	Davy Crockett and the River Pirates	Edited from the Davy Crockett miniseries
1956	Indian Paint	Also screenwriter
1967	Brighty of the Grand Canyon	Also screenwriter
1974	The Deathhead Virgin	
