= North of Shanghai =

1939 film

- Directed by: D. Ross Lederman
- Written by: Harold Buchman; Maurice Rapf
- Produced by: Wallace MacDonald
- Starring: James Craig
- Cinematography: Franz Planer
- Edited by: Al Clark
- Distributed by: Columbia Pictures
- Release date: January 24, 1939
- Running time: 59 minutes
- Country: United States
- Language: English

North of Shanghai is a 1939 American drama film directed by D. Ross Lederman.

== Cast ==
- James Craig as Jed Howard
- Betty Furness as Helen Warner
- Keye Luke as Jimmy Riley
- Morgan Conway as Bob Laird
- Joe Downing as Chandler (as Joseph Downing)
- Russell Hicks as Rowley
- Dorothy Gulliver as Sue
- Honorable Wu as Ming
- Dick Curtis as Creighton
- E. Alyn Warren as Leader
- Richard Loo as Jed's Pilot
