= Honorable Wu =

American actor

- Born: Ho Chee Chung; August 10, 1896; San Francisco, California
- Died: February 27, 1945 (aged 48); Los Angeles
- Other name: Harry Haw
- Occupation: Actor
- Relatives: Florence Ho (sister)

Honorable Wu (born Ho Chee Chung, and also known as Harry Haw) was an American vaudevillian and film actor who worked in Hollywood in the 1930s and 1940s. Born in San Francisco to Chinese immigrants, he died in 1945 in Los Angeles. His sister Florence Ho also appeared in a number of films.

== Selected filmography ==
- The Blonde from Singapore (1941)
- Passage from Hong Kong (1941)
- Ellery Queen and the Perfect Crime (1941)
- Ellery Queen's Penthouse Mystery (1941)
- Mr. Moto Takes a Vacation (1939)
- North of Shanghai (1939)
- The Crime of Doctor Hallet (1938)
- Stowaway (1936)
