= Mr. Moto Takes a Vacation =

1939 film by Norman Foster

- Directed by: Norman Foster
- Written by: Philip MacDonald; Norman Foster
- Based on: The character created by John P. Marquand
- Produced by: Sol M. Wurtzel
- Starring: Peter Lorre; Lionel Atwill
- Cinematography: Charles G. Clarke
- Edited by: Norman Colbert
- Music by: Samuel Kaylin
- Distributed by: 20th Century Fox
- Release date: June 1939
- Running time: 65 minutes
- Country: United States
- Language: English

Mr Moto Takes A Vacation (1939) is a Norman Foster-directed entry in the Mr. Moto film series, with Lionel Atwill and Joseph Schildkraut and George P. Huntley, Jr, as Archie Featherstone, in supporting roles.

This was the last Mr. Moto film that Peter Lorre appeared in. The movie was the seventh filmed in the series. However it was not released until after Mr. Moto in Danger Island, which was the last filmed out of eight Mr. Moto films from 20th Century Fox.

== Plot ==
American archeologist Howard Stevens recovers the ancient crown of the Queen of Sheba; the priceless artifact is shipped to the San Francisco Museum. Ostensibly on vacation, Mr. Moto shows up to guard the crown from a notorious master thief, whom everyone assumes is dead. Using a variety of disguises, the very-much-alive thief succeeds in pilfering the crown-only to discover that Moto has remained three steps ahead of him throughout the film.

== Cast ==
- Peter Lorre as Mr. Moto
- Joseph Schildkraut as Hendrik Manderson
- Lionel Atwill as Professor Hildebrand
- Virginia Field as Eleanore Kirke
- John 'Dusty' King as Howard Stevens (as John King)
- Iva Stewart as Susan French
- George P. Huntley, Jr as Archie Featherstone
- Victor Varconi as Paul Borodoff
- John Bleifer as Wendling
- Honorable Wu as Wong
- Morgan Wallace as David Perez
- Anthony Warde as Joe Rubla
- Harry Strang as O'Hara, Museum Guard
- John Davidson as Prince Suleid
- unbilled players include Jimmy Aubrey, Willie Best, Stanley Blystone, Gino Corrado, Ralph Dunn, Hank Mann, and Cyril Ring

== Production ==
The film was announced in July 1938.

John King was cast in August 1938.

Iva Stewart, a member of Fox's stock company, was given her first dramatic lead in the film. Lionel Atwill made the movie as the first in a four-picture deal with Fox.

== Reception ==
The film was released after Mr. Moto in Danger Island though it was filmed before it. The Los Angeles Times said "the plot misses fire on occasion." The Monthly Film Bulletin said it was "lifted out of the rut by the clever acting of Peter Lorre". The New York Times said it "seems to be missing on several cylinders".

== End of Series ==
Fox would go on to make Mr. Moto in Danger Island. In December 1938, Fox announced they would not give Lorre a new contract but that he still had four Moto films to make. However Lorre left the studio in July 1939, effectively ending the series.

== Home media ==
This film, along with Mr. Moto in Danger Island, Mr. Moto's Gamble, Mr. Moto's Last Warning and (as a DVD extra) The Return of Mr. Moto, was released on DVD in 2007 by 20th Century Fox as part of The Mr. Moto Collection, Volume Two.

== See also ==
- Think Fast, Mr. Moto
- Thank You, Mr. Moto
- Mr. Moto's Gamble
- Mr. Moto Takes a Chance
- Mysterious Mr. Moto
- Mr. Moto's Last Warning
- Mr. Moto in Danger Island
- The Return of Mr. Moto
