= Think Fast, Mr. Moto =

1937 film by Norman Foster

- Directed by: Norman Foster
- Screenplay by: Norman Foster; Philip MacDonald
- Based on: based on novel Think Fast, Mr Moto by John P. Marquand
- Produced by: Sol M. Wurtzel
- Starring: Peter Lorre; Thomas Beck; Virginia Field; Sig Ruman
- Cinematography: Harry Jackson
- Edited by: Alex Troffey
- Music by: R. H. Bassett; Samuel Kaylin
- Production company: 20th Century Fox
- Distributed by: 20th Century Fox
- Release date: August 1937
- Running time: 66 minutes
- Country: United States
- Language: English

Think Fast, Mr. Moto is a 1937 American mystery film directed by Norman Foster and featuring a mysterious Japanese detective named Mr. Moto. It is the first of eight films in the Mr. Moto series, all based on the character Mr. Moto created by John P. Marquand. The film stars Peter Lorre as the title character, Virginia Field, Thomas Beck and Sig Ruman. Mr. Moto works to stop a secret smuggling operation.

== Plot ==
The film opens with Mr. Moto in disguise as a street salesmen and selling goods to passers-by. He sees a man leaving a shop with a tattoo of the British Flag on his arm. Moto enters the shop to sell a rare diamond to the owner. However, Moto sees a body stuffed into a wicker basket in the store, and using his mastery of judo takes down the shopkeeper. Later, he reserves a stateroom on a passenger ship headed for Shanghai. Also on the liner is Bob Hitchings Jr., son of the owner of the shipping line. Before leaving, Hitchings Sr. gives his son a confidential letter for the head of the Shanghai branch of the company. Hitchings and Moto become friends (Moto notices the letter), and Moto helps Hitchings cure a hangover. Hitchings complains to Moto that he has not met any beautiful women on board. After a stop in Honolulu, a beautiful woman named Gloria Danton (real name Tanya Barova) boards the ship, and she and Hitchings fall in love. But Gloria is a spy for Nicolas Marloff, who runs a smuggling operation out of Shanghai. She periodically sends him notes and leaves without saying goodbye to Hitchings. Moto finds a steward looking for Hitchings' letter and confronts him, knowing he was the person who killed the man in the wicker basket, as he wears the tattoo. Moto throws the man overboard and takes the letter.

At Shanghai, Hitchings meets with Joseph B. Wilkie and gives him the letter, but later learns that it is a blank sheet of paper. He calls his father, who tells him the letter said to watch out for smugglers. Hitchings is determined to find Gloria, and he learns from an unknown person that she is at the International Club. Both he and Wilkie go there, as well as Moto and his date, Lela Liu. Hitchings finds Gloria performing at the club and goes to her dressing room. However, the club owner Marloff discovers them together and, knowing that Hitchings knows too much, locks them both up. Moto tells Lela to call the police, and seeks out Marloff. Posing as a fellow smuggler, he tricks Marloff into leading him to Gloria and Hitchings. Lela is shot while contacting the police, but manages to tell them where she is. Wilkie finds Marloff, and demands that Gloria and Hitchings be released. Marloff finds out that Moto is not a smuggler, then Moto apprehends him. Moto tells Wilkie to get Marloff's gun, the gun explodes as Wilkie tries to grab it, killing Marloff. Police storm the building, and Moto tells them the Wilkie headed the smuggling operation. Wilkie replaced the letter and shot Lela. Moto gave Wilkie the opportunity to kill Marloff, who knew he was in on the plot, and he did. Wilkie is arrested, and things go back to normal.

== Cast ==
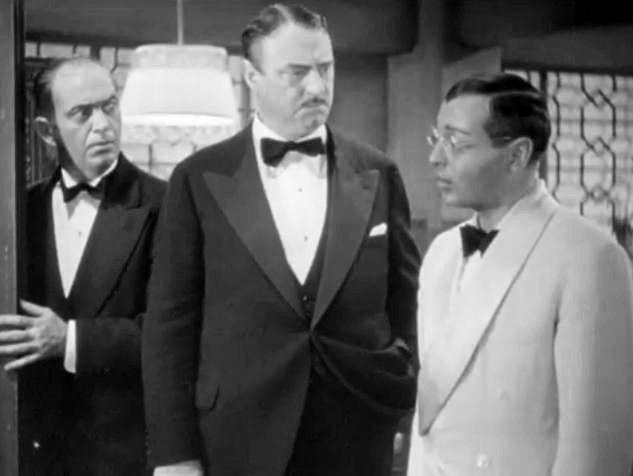
George Cooper, Sig Ruman and Peter Lorre in Think Fast, Mr. Moto

- Peter Lorre as Mr. Moto
- Thomas Beck as Bob Hitchings Jr.
- Virginia Field as Gloria Danton/Tanya Barova
- Murray Kinnell as Joseph B. Wilkie
- Sig Ruman as Nicolas Marloff
- John Rogers as Carson
- George Cooper as Muggs Blake
- Lotus Long as Lela Liu
- J. Carrol Naish as Adram

== Original novel ==
Think Fast, Mr. Moto was the third novel in the Moto series. It was originally a story That Girl and Mr Moto. Film rights to the novel were bought in July 1936. The novel itself was not published until May 1937.

== Production ==
=== Development ===
Mr Moto had been introduced to readers in the 1935 novel No Hero. It was popular and was followed by Thank You, Mr Moto in 1936 and then Think Fast, Mr Moto in 1937.

Twentieth Century Fox had three-film series at the time – Charlie Chan, the Jones Family, and the Jeeves movies with Arthur Treacher – and thought Mr Moto would make an ideal hero of a film series along the lines of Charlie Chan. In July 1936 Fox bought the film rights to Think Fast, Mr Moto. As Kenneth MacGowan, the intended producer, refused the job, the film became a "B" movie.

In January 1937 Fox cast Peter Lorre as Moto and Virginia Field as co-star. Lorre had just signed with Fox and made two films, Crack-Up and Nancy Steele Is Missing! He said he accepted the role because it gave him a rare chance to play a hero. In February Thomas Beck signed as the male romantic lead.

Norman Foster was assigned to direct. He was given a script by Howard Smith and rewrote it extensively. The film is very different from the novel although it uses some of the same names.

=== Shooting ===
Filming started February 11, 1937.

== Series ==
Think Fast, Mr. Moto was well liked at Fox and in April 1937 (several months before the film had been released to the public) the studio decided to make five more Moto movies, The studio vowed to provide good production values "to make them first string entertainment." starting with Thank You Mr Moto and Mr Moto's Gamble. In the end, Lorre played Moto eight times:

- Think Fast, Mr. Moto (1937)
- Thank You, Mr. Moto (1937)
- Mr. Moto's Gamble (1938)
- Mr. Moto Takes a Chance (1938)
- Mysterious Mr. Moto (1938)
- Mr. Moto's Last Warning (1939)
- Mr. Moto in Danger Island (1939)
- Mr. Moto Takes a Vacation (1939)

The novel Think Fast Mr Moto was not published until May 1937. In June 1937 Marquand reportedly sold four unwritten Moto stories to Fox at $8,000 each. In July 1937 it was announced Lorre and Rochelle Hudson would be in Look Out Mr Moto.

== Reception ==
20th Century-Fox released Think Fast, Mr. Moto in August 1937. The New York Times called it a "horse anchor on that pony plodder of pictures, Peter Lorre", but thought Lorre was "certainly the man for Mr. Marquand's Mr. Moto". The Chicago Tribune said "the action is snappy and unpredictable. Dialog's to the point and direction, staging and photography are commendable."" The Monthly Film Bulletin said, "Mr. Moto's moves are sometimes a little obscure, and we suspect that he is more lucky than scientific, but the dialogue is neat, the acting good and altogether the film has a real kick in it."

Variety accurately predicted success for a future film series and wrote, "This initial "Moto" yarn is so well done and fits Lorre so nicely that it indicates additional pictures in this Japanese mystery-sleuth groove."

In 2003 Mr. Moto was nominated for the American Film Institute list of the AFI's 100 Years...100 Heroes & Villains list, for this film.

== Home media ==
This film, together with Thank You, Mr. Moto, Mr. Moto Takes a Chance and Mysterious Mr. Moto, was released on DVD in 2006 by 20th Century Fox as part of The Mr. Moto Collection, Volume One.
