= Peter Lorre =

Hungarian and American actor (1904–1964)

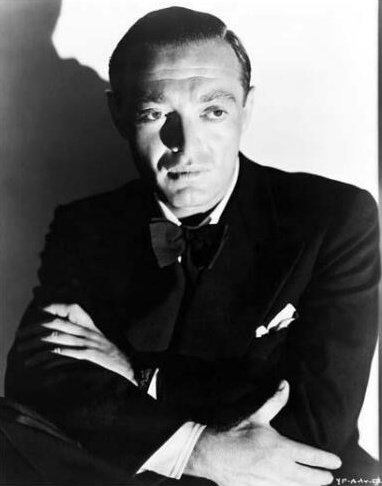
- Lorre in 1940
- Born: László Löwenstein; June 26, 1904; Rózsahegy, Kingdom of Hungary, Austria-Hungary
- Died: March 23, 1964 (aged 59); Los Angeles, California, US
- Resting place: Hollywood Forever Cemetery, Los Angeles, California, US
- Citizenship: US (from 1941)
- Occupation: Actor
- Years active: 1922–1964
- Spouses: Celia Lovsky (m. 1934; div. 1945); Kaaren Verne (m. 1945; div. 1950); Anne Marie Brenning (m. 1953)
- Children: 1

Peter Lorre (Note: German pronunciation: [ˈpeːtɐ ˈlɔʁə]) (born László Löwenstein; (Note: Hungarian pronunciation: [ˈlaːsloː ˈløːvɛ(n)ʃtɒjn]) June 26, 1904 – March 23, 1964) was a Hungarian and American actor, active first in Europe and later in the United States. Known for his timidly devious characters, appearance, and accented voice, he was frequently typecast as a sinister foreigner. He was caricatured throughout his life and his cultural legacy remains in the media today.

He began his stage career in Vienna, in the Austro-Hungarian Empire, before moving to Germany, where he worked first on the stage, then in film, in Berlin during the late 1920s and early 1930s. Lorre, who was Jewish, left Germany after Adolf Hitler and the Nazi Party came to power. Lorre caused an international sensation in the Weimar Republic–era film M (1931), in which he portrayed a serial killer who preys on children. His first English-language film was Alfred Hitchcock's The Man Who Knew Too Much (1934), made in the United Kingdom.

Eventually settling in Hollywood, he later became a featured player in many Warner Bros. crime and mystery films. He acted in Mad Love (1935), Crime and Punishment (1935), The Maltese Falcon (1941), Casablanca (1942), Arsenic and Old Lace (1944), Passage to Marseille (1944), and My Favorite Brunette (1947). During this time he acted in several films alongside Humphrey Bogart and Sydney Greenstreet.

Lorre played Mr. Moto, the Japanese detective, in a series of B-pictures from 1937 to 1939, and was the first actor to play a James Bond villain as Le Chiffre in a TV version of Casino Royale (1954). He later starred in films such as 20,000 Leagues Under the Sea (1954), Around the World in 80 Days (1956), Silk Stockings (1957), and The Comedy of Terrors (1963). Some of his last roles were in horror films directed by Roger Corman. In 2017, The Daily Telegraph named him one of the best actors never to have received an Academy Award nomination.

== Early life ==
Lorre was born László Löwenstein on June 26, 1904, in Rózsahegy, now known as Ružomberok, then part of Liptó County, Kingdom of Hungary, Austro-Hungarian Empire, and now part of Slovakia. He was the first child of German-speaking Hungarian Jews Elvira (née Freischberger) and Alajos Löwenstein. The couple had recently moved there (Note: Friedemann Beyer states in his biography of Lorre that Lorre's family were outsiders in Rózsahegy as they had arrived there very recently. They were German-speaking Jews from a majority Slovak town. Cf. Friedemann Beyer: Peter Lorre. Seine Filme – sein Leben, München 1988, p. 8 ("Sie waren Juden, und sie sprachen deutsch in einer Gegend, in der überwiegend Slowaken lebten.")) following Alajos's appointment as chief bookkeeper at a local textile mill. Alajos also served as a lieutenant in Austria's reserve force and was often away on military maneuvers.

Elvira died when Lorre was four years old, leaving Alajos with three very young sons. Alajos soon married Elvira's best friend Melanie Klein, with whom he had two more children. However, Lorre and Melanie never got along, and this colored his childhood memories. Anticipating that he might be conscripted following the outbreak of the Second Balkan War in 1913, Alajos moved the family to Vienna. Following the outbreak of World War I, he served on the Eastern Front during the winter of 1914–1915 before being put in command of a prison camp due to heart trouble.

== Career ==
=== In Europe (1922–1934) ===
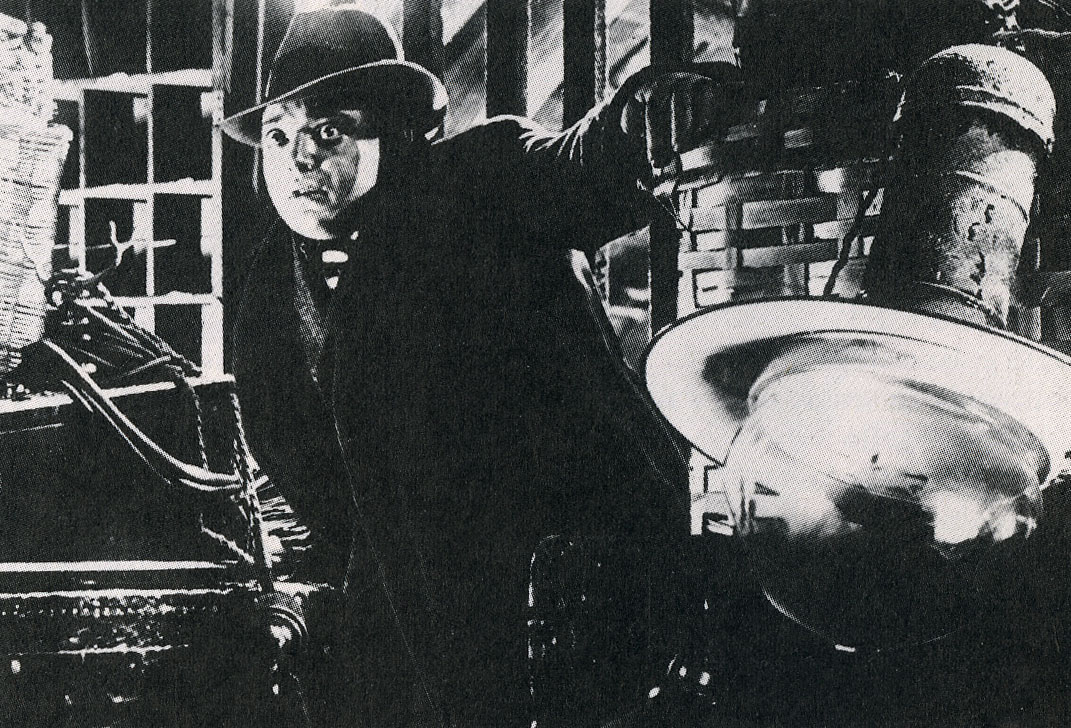
Lorre in M (1931)

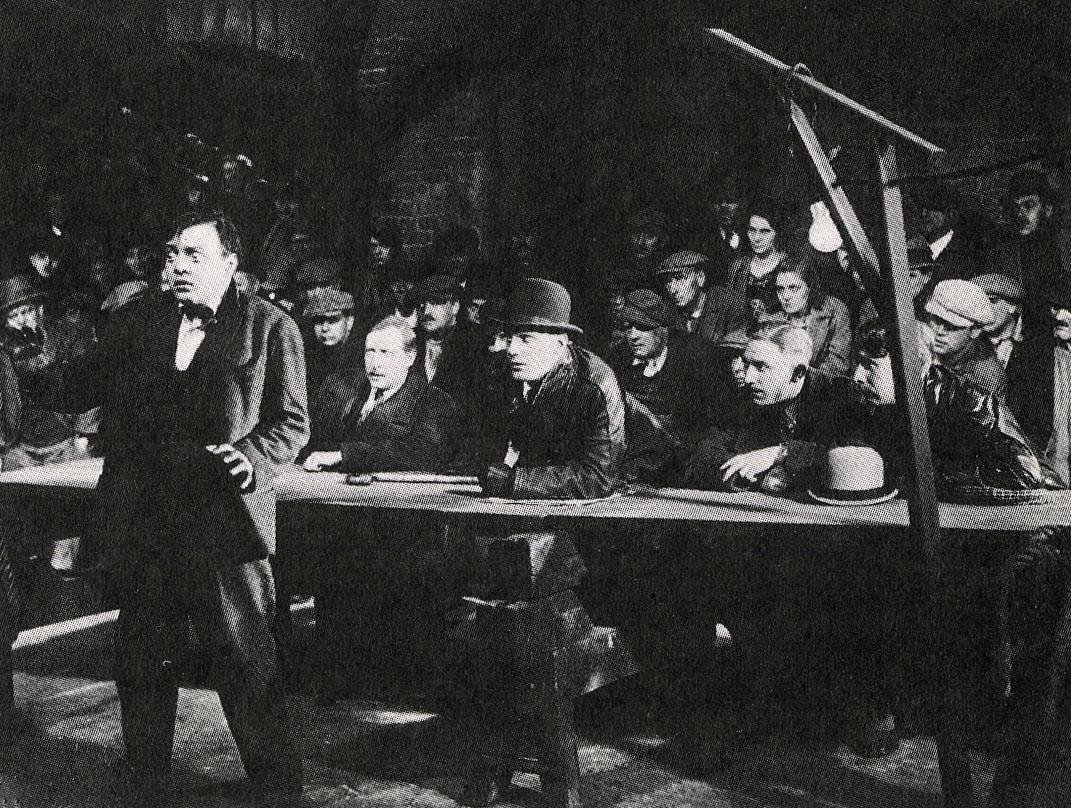
Lorre (left) in M (1931)

Lorre began acting on stage in Vienna at age 17, working with Viennese Art Nouveau artist and puppeteer Richard Teschner. He then moved to Breslau and later to Zürich. In the late 1920s, the actor moved to Berlin, where he worked with Bertolt Brecht, including a role in Brecht's Man Equals Man and as Dr. Nakamura in the musical Happy End. During this time, he earned his stage name from a theater manager who compared his appearance to children's book character Struwwelpeter (Shock-headed Peter).

Lorre became much better known after director Fritz Lang cast him as child-killer Hans Beckert in M (1931), a film reputedly inspired by the Peter Kürten case. Lang said that he had Lorre in mind for the part and did not give him a screen test because he was already convinced Lorre was perfect for the part. He stated that the actor gave his best performance in M and that it was among the most distinguished in film history. Sharon Packer observed that Lorre played the "loner, [and] schizotypal murderer" with "raspy voice, bulging eyes, and emotive acting (a holdover from the silent screen) [which] always make him memorable."

In 1932, Lorre appeared alongside Hans Albers in the science fiction film F.P.1 antwortet nicht about an artificial island in the mid-Atlantic.

When the Nazis gained power in Germany in 1933, Lorre took refuge first in Paris and then London, where he was noticed by Ivor Montagu, associate producer for The Man Who Knew Too Much (1934), who reminded the film's director, Alfred Hitchcock, about Lorre's performance in M. They considered him to play the assassin, but wanted to use him in a larger role despite his limited command of English, which Lorre overcame by learning much of his part phonetically. In 2014, in The Guardian, Michael Newton wrote, "Lorre cannot help but steal each scene; he's a physically present actor, often, you feel, surrounded as he is by the pallid English, the only one in the room with a body."

Lorre and his first wife, actress Celia Lovsky, boarded the Cunard-White Star Liner RMS Majestic in Southampton on July 18, 1934, to sail for New York a day after shooting had been completed on The Man Who Knew Too Much, having gained visitor's visas to the United States.

After his first two American films, Lorre returned to England to feature in Hitchcock's Secret Agent (1936).

=== First years in Hollywood (1935–1940) ===
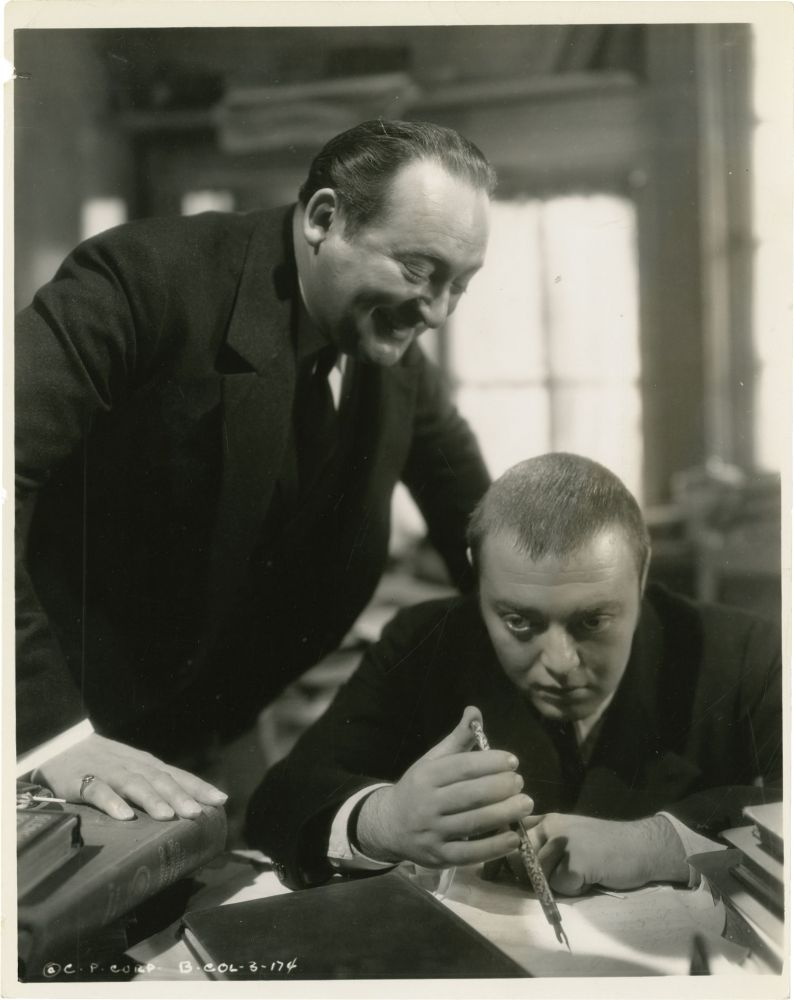
Edward Arnold and Lorre in Crime and Punishment (1935)

Lorre settled in Hollywood and was soon under contract to Columbia Pictures, which had difficulty finding parts suitable for him. After some months of research, Lorre decided on Crime and Punishment by Dostoevsky as a suitable project with himself in the central role. Columbia's head Harry Cohn agreed to make the film adaptation on the condition that he could lend Lorre to Metro-Goldwyn-Mayer, possibly as a means of recouping the cost of Lorre not appearing in any of his films.

For MGM's Mad Love (1935), set in Paris and directed by Karl Freund, Lorre's head was shaved for the role of Dr. Gogol, a demented surgeon who replaces the wrecked hands of a concert pianist with those of an executed knife murderer. An actress who works at the nearby Grand Guignol theater, who happens to be the pianist's wife, is the subject of Gogol's unwelcome infatuation. "Lorre triumphs superbly in a characterization that is sheer horror", The Hollywood Reporter commented. "There is perhaps no one who can be so repulsive and so utterly wicked. No one who can smile so disarmingly and still sneer. His face is his fortune".

Lorre followed Mad Love with the lead role in Crime and Punishment (also 1935) directed by Josef von Sternberg. "Although Peter Lorre is occasionally able to give the film a frightening pathological significance," wrote Andre Sennwald in The New York Times on the film's release, "this is scarcely Dostoievsky's drama of a tortured brain drifting into madness with a terrible secret." Columbia offered him a five-year contract at $1,000 a week (equivalent to $23,483 in 2025), but he declined.

Returning from England after appearing in a second Hitchcock picture (Secret Agent, 1936), he was offered and accepted a 3-year contract with 20th Century Fox. Starring in a series of Mr. Moto movies, Lorre played John P. Marquand's character, a Japanese detective and spy. Initially positive about the films, he soon grew frustrated. "The role is childish," he said, and eventually tended to dismiss the films entirely. He twisted his shoulder during a stunt in Mr. Moto Takes a Vacation (1939), the penultimate entry of the series. In 1939, he attended a lunch at the request of some visiting Japanese officials; Lorre wore a badge that read "Boycott Japanese goods."

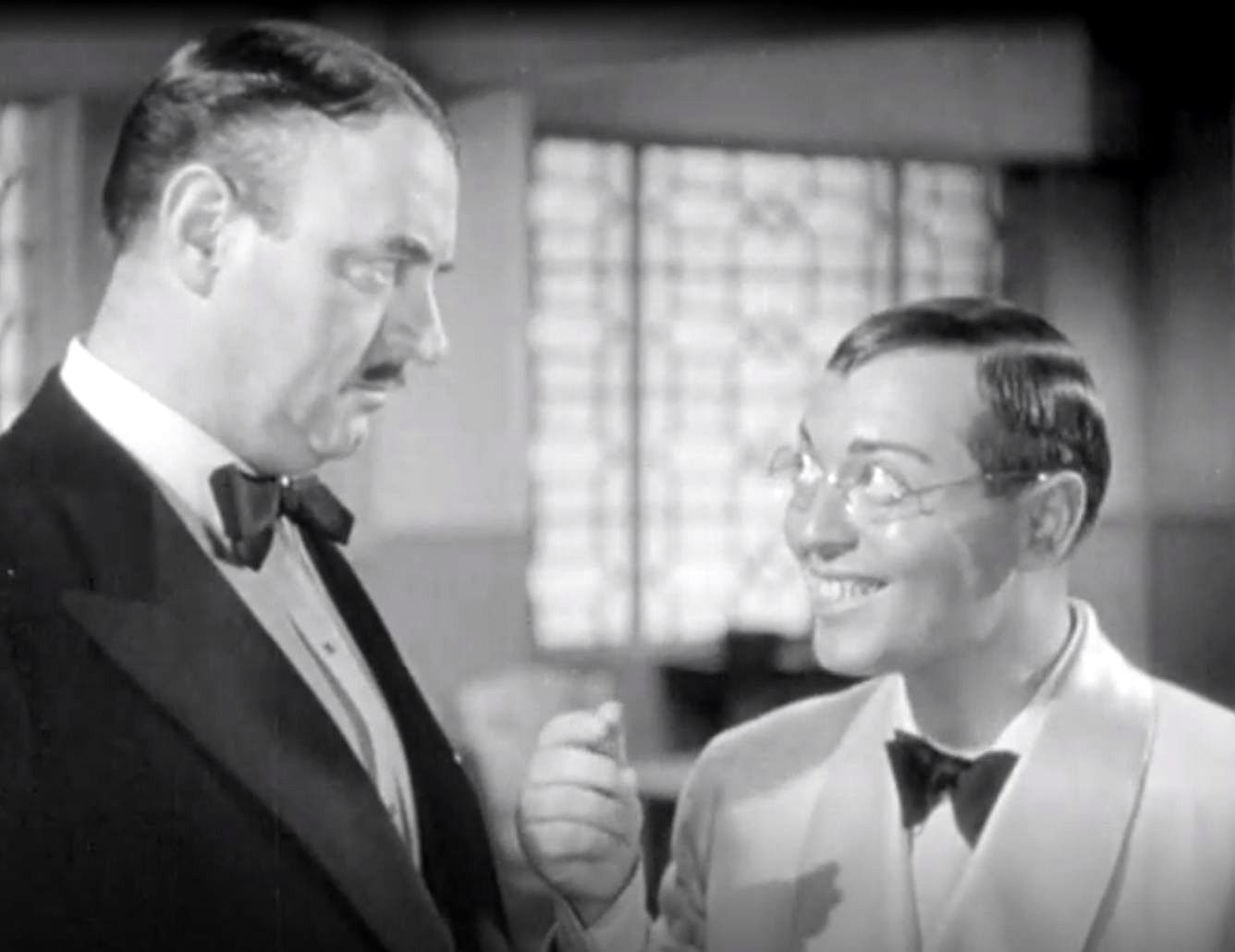
With Sig Ruman in Think Fast, Mr. Moto (1937)

Late in 1938, Universal Pictures wanted to borrow Lorre from Fox for the top-billed titular role ultimately performed by Basil Rathbone in Son of Frankenstein (1939) starring Boris Karloff as Frankenstein's monster and Bela Lugosi as Ygor. Lorre declined the role because he thought his menacing parts were now behind him, although he was ill at this time. He tested successfully in 1937 for the role of Quasimodo in an aborted MGM version of The Hunchback of Notre-Dame, according to a Fox publicist one of two roles Lorre most wanted to play, the other being Napoleon. Frustrated by broken promises from Fox, Lorre managed to end his contract.

After a brief period as a freelance, he signed for two pictures at RKO in May 1940. In the first of these, Lorre appeared as the anonymous lead in the B-picture Stranger on the Third Floor (1940), reputedly the first film noir. The second RKO film, also in 1940, was You'll Find Out, a musical comedy mystery vehicle for bandleader Kay Kyser in which Lorre spoofed his sinister image alongside horror stars Bela Lugosi and Boris Karloff.

=== Mainly at Warner Bros. (1941–1946) ===
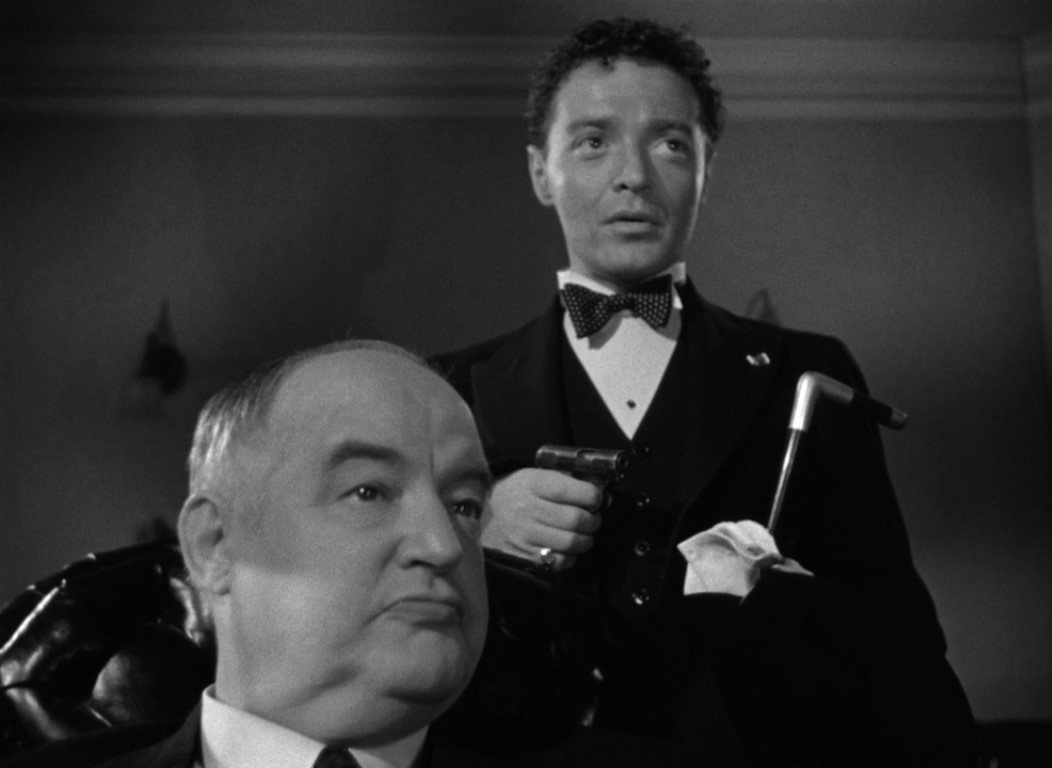
Sydney Greenstreet (left) and Lorre in The Maltese Falcon (1941), the first of their nine films together

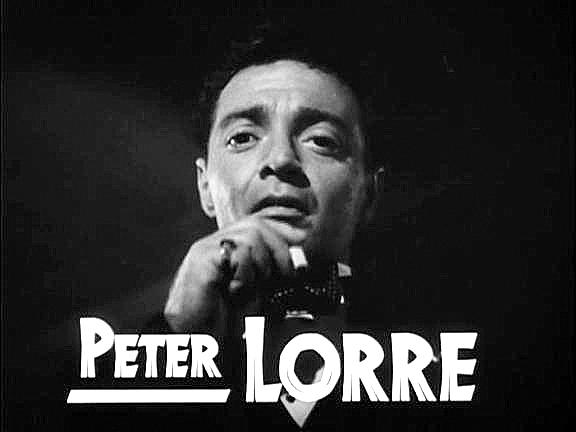
Lorre in the 1941 trailer for The Maltese Falcon

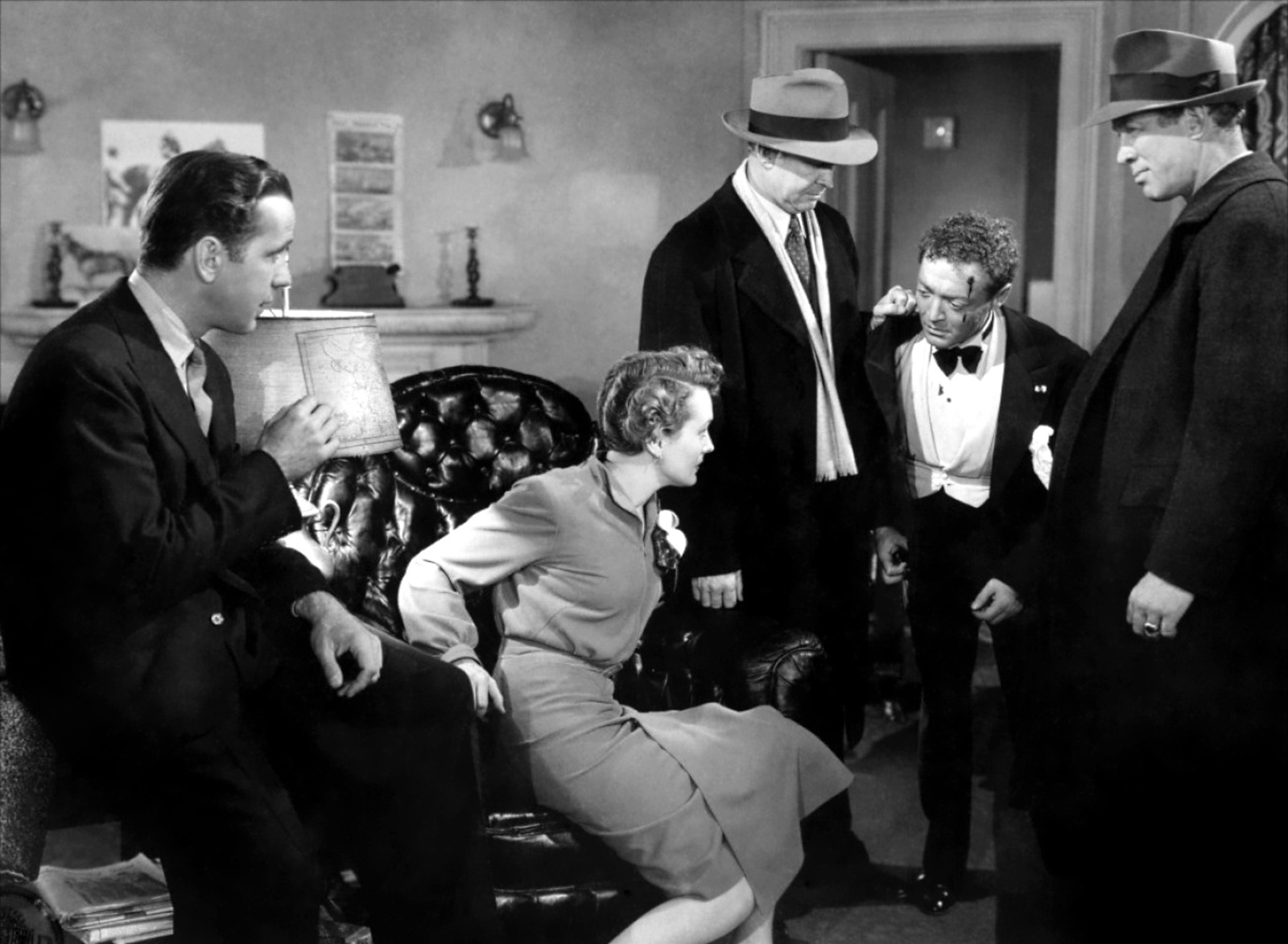
Humphrey Bogart, Mary Astor, Barton MacLane, Lorre, and Ward Bond in The Maltese Falcon

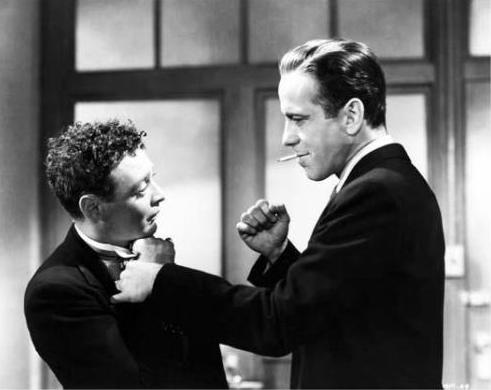
With Humphrey Bogart in The Maltese Falcon (1941)

In 1941, Lorre became a naturalized citizen of the United States. Director John Huston saved him from more B-pictures by casting him in The Maltese Falcon. Although Warner Bros. was lukewarm, Huston was keen for him to play Joel Cairo, observing that Lorre "had that clear combination of braininess and real innocence, and sophistication... He's always doing two things at the same time, thinking one thing and saying something else." Lorre himself reminisced fondly in 1962 about the "stock company" he now found himself working with: Humphrey Bogart, Sydney Greenstreet and Claude Rains. In his view, the four of them had the rare ability to "switch an audience from laughter to seriousness."

Lorre was contracted to Warner on a picture-by-picture basis until 1943 when he signed a five-year contract, renewable each year, which lasted until 1946.

In 1942, he portrayed the character Ugarte in Casablanca. While Ugarte is a small part, it is he who provides Rick with the "Letters of Transit", a key plot device. Lorre made nine movies with Sydney Greenstreet counting The Maltese Falcon and Casablanca, a team which came to be called "Little Pete-Big Syd", although they did not always have much screen time in joint scenes.

Most of these motion pictures were variations on Casablanca, including Background to Danger (1943, with George Raft); Passage to Marseille (1944), reuniting them with Humphrey Bogart and Claude Rains; The Mask of Dimitrios (1944); The Conspirators (1944, with Hedy Lamarr and Paul Henreid); Hollywood Canteen (1944); Three Strangers (1946), a suspense film about three people who are joint partners on a winning lottery ticket, with third-billed Lorre cast against type by director Jean Negulesco as the romantic lead, also starring Geraldine Fitzgerald.

Greenstreet and Lorre's final film together, suspense thriller The Verdict (1946), was director Don Siegel's first feature, with Greenstreet and Lorre billed first and second respectively.

In 1944, Lorre returned to comedy with the role of Dr. Einstein in Frank Capra's version of Arsenic and Old Lace, starring Cary Grant and Raymond Massey. Writing in 1944, film critic Manny Farber described what he called Lorre's "double-take job", a characteristic dramatic flourish "where the actor's face changes rapidly from laughter, love or a security that he doesn't really feel to a face more sincerely menacing, fearful or deadpan."

In 1946, Lorre's last film for Warner was The Beast with Five Fingers, a horror film in which he played a crazed astrologer who falls in love with a character played by Andrea King. Daniel Bubbeo, in The Women of Warner Brothers, thought Lorre's "wildly over-the top performance" had "elevated the movie from minor horror to first-rate camp."

Lorre said his continuing friendship with Bertolt Brecht, in exile in California since 1941, had led studio head Jack L. Warner to 'graylist' him, and his contract with Warner Bros. was terminated on May 13, 1946. Warner was a "friendly" witness at his appearance before the House Un-American Activities Committee in May 1947. Lorre himself was sympathetic to the short-lived Committee for the First Amendment, set up by John Huston and others, and added his name to advertisements in the trade press in support of the committee.

=== After World War II (1947–1964) ===
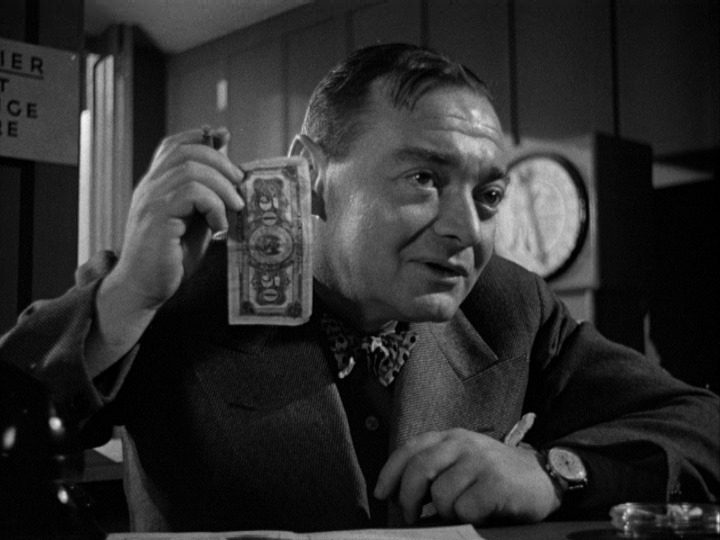
Lorre in Quicksand, 1950

After World War II and the end of his Warner contract, Lorre's acting career in Hollywood experienced a downturn. He concentrated on radio and stage work. In 1949, he filed for bankruptcy. In the autumn of 1950, he traveled to West Germany to make the film noir Der Verlorene (The Lost One, 1951) which Lorre co-wrote, directed and starred in. According to Gerd Gemünden in Continental Strangers: German Exile Cinema, 1933–1951, with the exception of Josef von Báky's Der Ruf (The Last Illusion, 1949), it is the only film by an emigrant from Germany which uses a return to the country "addressing questions of guilt and responsibility; of accountability and justice." While it gained some critical approval, audiences avoided it and it did badly at the box office.

In February 1952, Lorre returned to the United States, where he resumed appearances as a character actor in television and feature films, often parodying his "creepy" image. He was the first actor to play a James Bond villain when he portrayed Le Chiffre in a 1954 television adaptation of Ian Fleming's novel Casino Royale, opposite Barry Nelson as an American James Bond referred to as "Jimmy Bond".

Lorre starred alongside Kirk Douglas and James Mason in 20,000 Leagues Under the Sea (1954) around this time. Lorre appeared in NBC's espionage drama Five Fingers (1959), starring David Hedison, in the episode "Thin Ice", and, in 1960, in Rawhide as Victor Laurier in "The Incident of the Slavemaster" and in Wagon Train as Alexander Portlass in "The Alexander Portlass Story".

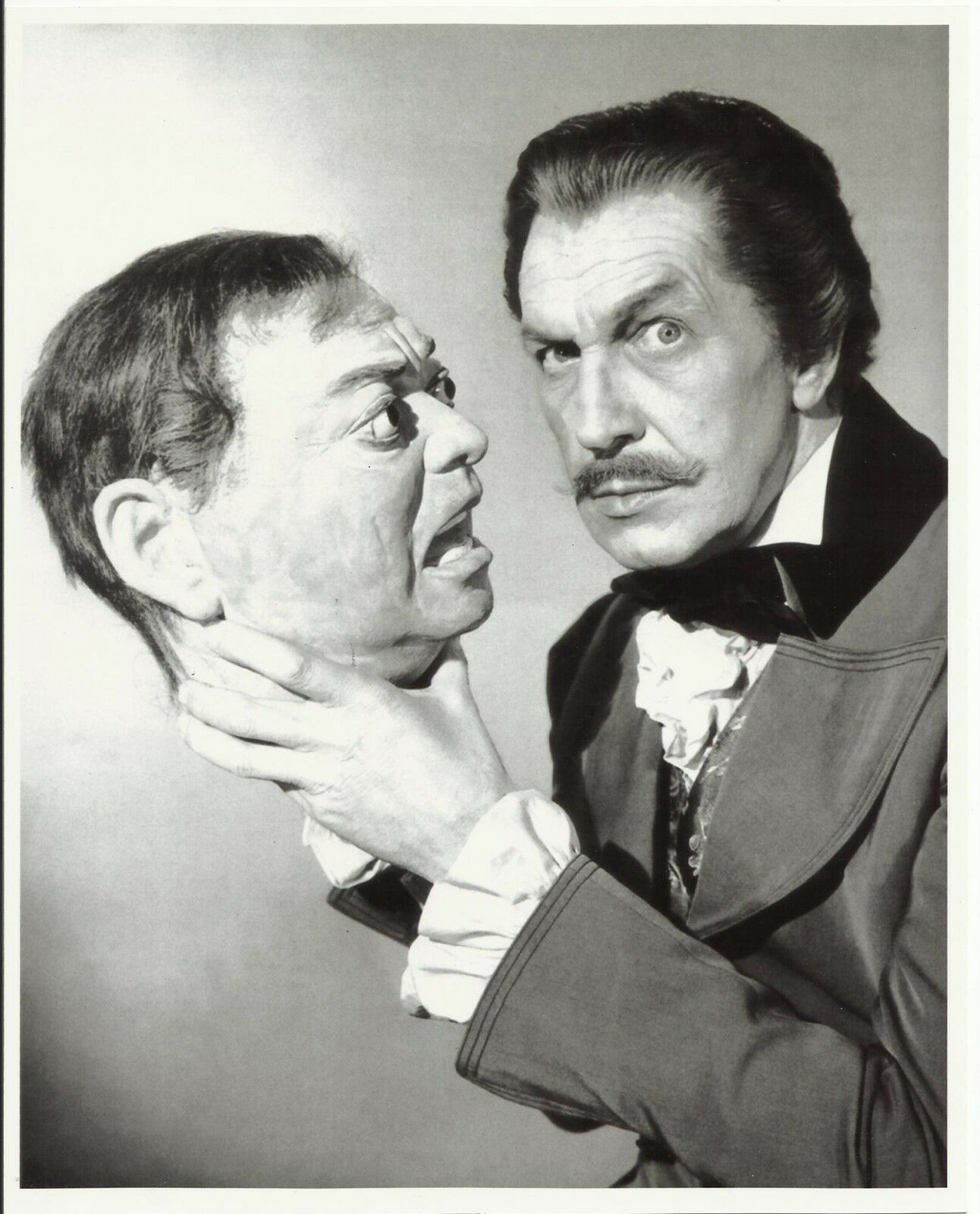
Vincent Price holding a replica of Lorre's head to publicize Tales of Terror, 1962

Lorre appeared in six episodes of Playhouse 90 as well as two episodes of Alfred Hitchcock Presents broadcast in 1957 and 1960, the latter a version of the Roald Dahl short story "Man from the South" starring Steve McQueen, Lorre and McQueen's wife Neile Adams. He had a supporting role in the film Voyage to the Bottom of the Sea (1961).

In Lorre's last years, he worked with Roger Corman on several low-budget films, including two of the director's Edgar Allan Poe cycle: Tales of Terror (1962) with Vincent Price and Basil Rathbone; and The Raven (1963), again with Price, as well as Boris Karloff and Jack Nicholson. He again worked with Price, Karloff and Rathbone in the Jacques Tourneur-directed The Comedy of Terrors (1963). He also appeared in a memorable 1962 episode of Route 66, "Lizard's Leg and Owlet's Wing", with Lon Chaney Jr. and Boris Karloff.

== Personal life ==
Lorre was married three times: to Celia Lovsky (1934 – March 13, 1945, divorced), to Kaaren Verne (May 25, 1945 – 1950, divorced), and to Anne Marie Brenning (July 21, 1953 – March 23, 1964, his death). In 1953, Brenning bore Lorre's only child, Catharine. Anne Marie Brenning died in 1971.

His daughter later made headlines after serial killer Kenneth Bianchi confessed to police investigators that he and his cousin and fellow "Hillside Strangler" Angelo Buono, posing as undercover police officers, had stopped her in 1977 with the intent of abduction and murder, but let her go on learning that she was the daughter of Peter Lorre. It was only after Bianchi was arrested that Catharine realized whom she had met. Catharine died of complications from diabetes, on May 7, 1985, aged 32.

== Later life ==
Lorre had suffered from chronic gallbladder troubles, for which doctors had prescribed morphine. Lorre became trapped between the constant pain and addiction to morphine to ease the problem. It was during the period of the Mr. Moto films that Lorre struggled with and overcame his addiction. Having quickly gained 100 lb (45 kg) and not fully recovering from his addiction to morphine, Lorre suffered personal and career disappointments in his later life.

== Death ==
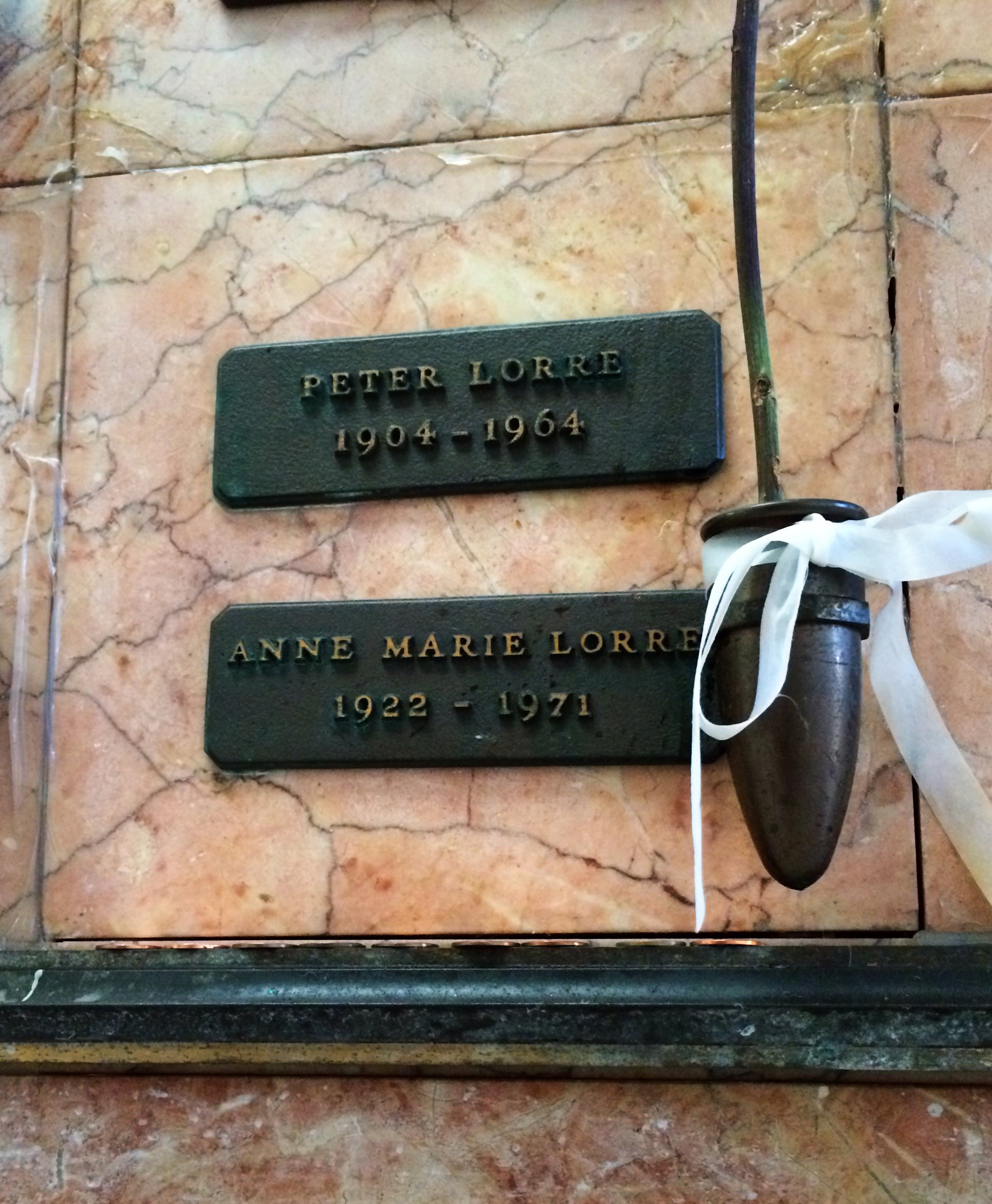
Peter Lorre's niche at Hollywood Forever

Lorre died in Los Angeles on March 23, 1964, from a stroke. His body was cremated and his ashes were interred at the Hollywood Forever Cemetery in Hollywood. Vincent Price read the eulogy at his funeral.

== Legacy and honours ==
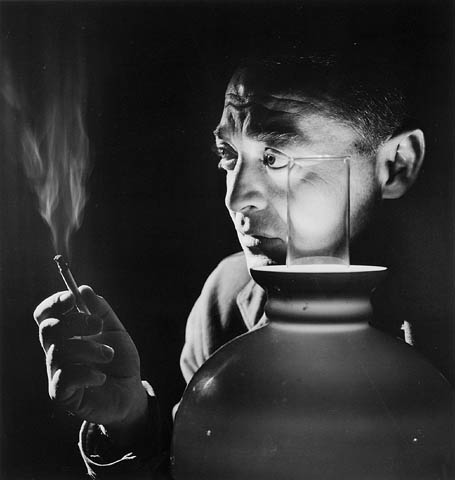
A 1946 portrait of Peter Lorre by Yousuf Karsh

Lorre was inducted into the Grand Order of Water Rats, the world's oldest theatrical fraternity, in 1942. Lorre was honored with a star on the Hollywood Walk of Fame at 6619 Hollywood Boulevard in February 1960.

Actor Eugene Weingand, who was unrelated to Lorre, attempted in 1963 to trade on his slight resemblance to the actor by changing his name to "Peter Lorie", but his petition was rejected by the courts. After Lorre's death, however, he referred to himself as "Peter Lorre Jr.", claiming to be Lorre's son. He obtained a few small acting roles as a result, including a brief uncredited appearance as a cab driver in Alfred Hitchcock's Torn Curtain (1966) starring Paul Newman and Julie Andrews.

Filk songwriter Tom Smith (1988) wrote a tribute to Lorre's acting called "I Want to Be Peter Lorre", which was nominated for the "Best Tribute" Pegasus Award in 1992 and 2004, and which won the award for "Best Classic Filk Song" in 2006.

Punk cabaret band The World/Inferno Friendship Society's 2007 album Addicted to Bad Ideas: Peter Lorre's Twentieth Century is a concept album written as a tribute to Lorre, focusing on the transition from Weimar Germany to the Third Reich, and Lorre's later career and death. The World/Inferno Friendship Society's lead singer Jack Terricloth describes Lorre as "a strangely charismatic, extremely creepy person, which I think most punk rockers can identify with ... It's the lure of the other. He's the underdog, the outsider."

=== Characterizations and impressions ===
Warner Bros. cartoonists' frequently used characterizations of Lorre. These regularly appeared in Looney Tunes and Merrie Melodies animated film shorts, including Hollywood Steps Out (1941), Horton Hatches the Egg (1942), Hair-Raising Hare (1946), and many more through the 1940s and 1950s. The Looney Tunes version of the character was featured in the films Looney Tunes: Back in Action (2003) and Coyote vs. Acme (2026); in the latter, he was officially given the name "Dr. Peter Lorre" after his inspiration. Caricatures of Lorre have persisted in film and television for decades, including live-action and animated bit characters in numerous films and television programs. Vocal impressions of Lorre have been used to create the voices of cartoon characters such as: Morocco Mole on The Secret Squirrel Show in the 1960s, Ren Höek in The Ren & Stimpy Show in the 1990s, Kamek the magician in The Super Mario Bros. Movie in 2023, and the voice of the General Mills Boo Berry ghost character in their monster-themed cereal campaign since 1973.

== Filmography ==
=== Film ===
Year	Title	Role	Director	Notes
1929	The Missing Wife	Dentist's patient	Karl Leiter	Uncredited
1931	M	Hans Beckert	Fritz Lang	
1931	Bomben auf Monte Carlo	Pawlitschek	Hanns Schwarz	
1931	Die Koffer des Herrn O.F.	Redakteur Stix	Alexis Granowsky	
1932	Fünf von der Jazzband	Car thief	Erich Engel	
1932	Schuß im Morgengrauen	Klotz	Alfred Zeisler	
1932	Der Weisse Damon	Hunchback	Kurt Gerron	
1932	Stupefiants	Hunchback	Roger Le Bon	
1932	F.P.1 antwortet nicht	Bildreporter Johnny	Karl Hartl	
1933	Was Frauen Träumen	Otto Fuesslli	Géza von Bolváry	
1933	Les Requins du Petrole	Henry Pless	Henri Decoin	
1933	Unsichtbare Gegner	Henry Pless	Rudolph Cartier	
1933	Du haut en bas	Beggar	G. W. Pabst	
1934	The Man Who Knew Too Much	Abbott	Alfred Hitchcock	
1935	Mad Love	Dr. Gogol	Karl Freund	
1935	Crime and Punishment	Roderick Raskolnikov	Josef von Sternberg	
1936	Secret Agent	The General	Alfred Hitchcock	
1936	Crack-Up	Colonel Gimpy	Malcolm St. Clair	
1937	Nancy Steele Is Missing!	Professor Sturm	George Marshall; Otto Preminger	
1937	Think Fast, Mr. Moto	Mr. Kentaro Moto	Norman Foster	
1937	Lancer Spy	Major Sigfried Gruning	Gregory Ratoff	
1937	Thank You, Mr. Moto	Mr. Kentaro Moto	Norman Foster	
1938	Mr. Moto's Gamble	Mr. Kentaro Moto	James Tinling	
1938	Mr. Moto Takes a Chance	Mr. Kentaro Moto	Norman Foster	
1938	I'll Give a Million	Louis 'The Dope' Monteau	Walter Lang	
1938	Mysterious Mr. Moto	Mr. Kentaro Moto	Norman Foster	
1939	Mr. Moto's Last Warning	Mr. Kentaro Moto	Norman Foster	
1939	Mr. Moto in Danger Island	Mr. Kentaro Moto	Herbert I. Leeds	
1939	Mr. Moto Takes a Vacation	Mr. Kentaro Moto	Norman Foster	
1940	Strange Cargo	M'sieu Pig	Frank Borzage	
1940	I Was an Adventuress	Polo	Gregory Ratoff	
1940	Island of Doomed Men	Stephen Danel	Charles Barton	
1940	Stranger on the Third Floor	The Stranger	Boris Ingster	
1940	You'll Find Out	Fenninger	Fred Fleck	
1941	The Face Behind the Mask	Jamos 'Johnny' Szabo	Robert Florey	
1941	Mr. District Attorney	Paul Hyde	William Morgan	
1941	They Met in Bombay	Captain Chang	Clarence Brown	
1941	The Maltese Falcon	Joel Cairo	John Huston	
1942	All Through the Night	Pepi	Vincent Sherman	
1942	Invisible Agent	Baron Ikito	Edwin L. Marin	
1942	The Boogie Man Will Get You	Dr. Arthur Lorencz	Lew Landers	
1942	Casablanca	Signor Ugarte	Michael Curtiz	
1943	The Constant Nymph	Fritz Bercovy	Edmund Goulding	
1943	Background to Danger	Nikolai Zaleshoff	Raoul Walsh	
1943	The Cross of Lorraine	Sergeant Berger	Tay Garnett	
1944	Passage to Marseille	Marius	Michael Curtiz	
1944	The Mask of Dimitrios	Cornelius Leyden	Jean Negulesco	
1944	Arsenic and Old Lace	Dr. Einstein	Frank Capra	
1944	The Conspirators	Jan Bernazsky	Jean Negulesco	
1944	Hollywood Canteen	Himself	Delmer Daves	
1945	Hotel Berlin	Johannes Koenig	Peter Godfrey	
1945	Confidential Agent	Contreras	Herman Shumlin	
1946	Three Strangers	Johnny West	Jean Negulesco	
1946	Black Angel	Marko	Roy William Neill	
1946	The Chase	Gino	Arthur Ripley	
1946	The Verdict	Victor Emmric	Don Siegel	
1946	The Beast with Five Fingers	Hilary Cummins	Robert Florey	
1947	My Favorite Brunette	Kismet	Elliott Nugent	
1948	Casbah	Slimane	John Berry	
1949	Rope of Sand	Toady	William Dieterle	
1950	Quicksand	Nick	Irving Pichel	
1950	Double Confession	Paynter	Ken Annakin	
1951	The Lost One	Dr. Karl Rohte, a.k.a. Dr. Karl Neumeister	Peter Lorre	
1953	Beat the Devil	Julius O'Hara	John Huston	
1954	20,000 Leagues Under the Sea	Conseil	Richard Fleischer	
1956	Meet Me in Las Vegas	Himself	Roy Rowland	Uncredited cameo
1956	Congo Crossing	Colonel John Miguel Orlando Arragas	Joseph Pevney	
1956	Around the World in Eighty Days	Japanese Steward on the S.S. Carnatic	Michael Anderson	
1957	The Buster Keaton Story	Kurt Bergner	Sidney Sheldon	
1957	Collector's Item: The Left Fist of David	Mr. Munsey		Short film
1957	Silk Stockings	Brankov	Rouben Mamoulian	
1957	The Story of Mankind	Nero	Irwin Allen	
1957	The Sad Sack	Abdul	George Marshall	
1957	Hell Ship Mutiny	Commissioner Lamoret	Elmo Williams	
1959	The Big Circus	Skeeter	Joseph M. Newman	
1960	Scent of Mystery	Smiley	Jack Cardiff	
1961	Voyage to the Bottom of the Sea	Commodore Lucius Emery	Irwin Allen	
1962	Tales of Terror	Montresor Herringbone	Roger Corman	Featured in the segment "The Black Cat"
1962	Five Weeks in a Balloon	Ahmed	Irwin Allen	
1963	The Raven	Dr. Adolphus Bedlo	Roger Corman	
1964	The Comedy of Terrors	Felix Gillie	Jacques Tourneur	
1964	Muscle Beach Party	Mr. Strangdour	William Asher	Posthumous release
1964	The Patsy	Morgan Heywood	Jerry Lewis	Posthumous release, final film role

=== Television ===
Year	Title	Role	Notes
1954–1955	Climax!	Le Chiffre	2 episodes, including "Casino Royale"
1956	Screen Directors Playhouse	Willy	"No. 5 Checked Out"
1957–1960	Alfred Hitchcock Presents	Tomas Salgado/Carlos	2 episodes
1960	Wagon Train	Alexander Portlass	Episode: "The Alexander Portlass Story"
1960	Rawhide	Victor Laurier	Episode: "Incident of the Slavemaster"
1962	Route 66	Peter Lorre	Episode: "Lizard's Leg and Owlet's Wing"
1963	The Jack Benny Show	Peter Lorre	Episode: "The Peter Lorre and Joanie Sommers Show"
