= Mr. Moto's Last Warning =

- Directed by: Norman Foster
- Written by: Philip MacDonald; Norman Foster
- Based on: character created by John P. Marquand
- Produced by: Sol M. Wurtzel
- Starring: Peter Lorre; Ricardo Cortez; Virginia Field; John Carradine
- Distributed by: 20th Century Fox
- Release date: January 20, 1939
- Running time: 71 minutes
- Country: United States
- Language: English

Mr. Moto's Last Warning is the sixth in a series of eight films starring Peter Lorre as Mr. Moto. A contemporary review said, "The improbable story is made faintly plausible, and definitely thrilling as a result of Peter Lorre's acting in the main part." It is an original story featuring the character created by John P. Marquand.

Mr. Moto's Last Warning is the only Mr. Moto film in the public domain.

== Plot ==
The British Navy in Port Said is making plans for naval manoeuvres with the French fleet. Plans are delayed because the British Secret Service has been warned of possible sabotage. On a ship docking in Port Said is Madame Delacour, wife of the French naval admiral. Delacour and her daughter Marie are befriended by the charming Eric Norvel, the goofy Rollo Venables, and someone posing as Mr. Moto. Norvel reveals his true nature when the ship docks and he lures Mr. Moto to his death. This "fake" Mr. Moto turns out to be a fellow agent of Mr. Moto, posing as a curio dealer, Mr. Kuroki.

Norvel takes Delacour and Venables to a variety show featuring Fabian the Great, a ventriloquist. Fabian is the leader of the gang of saboteurs, which includes Hakim, Captain Hawkins, Danforth, and Norvel. Danforth is actually a British Secret Service agent named Burke. Moto listens in on their conversation and is almost captured, but Burke helps him escape. Norvel is given the task of learning from Delacour when the French fleet is due at Port Said.

The suspicious Fabian thinks that Kuroki may actually be Mr. Moto. Fabian enlists his girlfriend Connie, who is unaware he is an agent, to follow Mr. Moto the next day. She sees Moto visit the Port Commandant's office where he learns of the salvage ship "The Vulcan" captained by Hawkins.

Fabian also discovers that Danforth is the secret agent, Burke. Fabian lures Burke to "The Vulcan" and reveals his plan to blow up the French fleet and blame the British. He then kills Burke by trapping him in a diving bell. Norvel gets the information needed and tells Fabian at the theater. Connie overhears the conversation and threatens to call the Port Commandant, but Fabian convinces her to go along with him.

Hakim tries to kill Moto with a bomb, but Moto escapes the explosion and follows Hakim to a warehouse. Moto enlists Venables to help, but Venables is tricked by Norvel. After a fight, Moto and Venables are tied in sacks and thrown into the ocean, but not before Moto tricks Hawkins and grabs a piece of sharp metal. Connie can't bear to see this violence and goes to call the police. Fabian knocks her out and proceeds with his plans.

Moto escapes underwater and frees Venables, who goes to the police. Norvel dives down to await a signal from Fabian but Moto overpowers him and prematurely detonates the explosives meant to destroy the French fleet. Resurfacing, Moto fights with Fabian but Connie shows up and shoots Fabian. Moto discovers the saboteur's plans in Fabian's dummy but never reveals to the audience which country tried to engineer a war between France and England.

== Cast ==
- Peter Lorre as Mr. Kentaro Moto (a.k.a. Mr. Kiroki)
- Ricardo Cortez as Fabian the Great
- Virginia Field as Connie Porter
- John Carradine as Danforth (a.k.a. Richard Burke)
- George Sanders as Eric Norvel
- Joan Carroll as Mary "Marie" Delacour (credited as Joan Carol)
- Robert Coote as Rollo Venables
- Margaret Irving as Madame Delacour
- Leyland Hodgson as Captain Bert Hawkins
- John Davidson as Hakim
- Teru Shimada as the Fake Mr. Moto

== Production notes ==
The film was announced in April 1938. The title was then changed to Mr. Moto in Egypt before it eventually became Mr Moto's Last Warning.

In April, the studio announced they were considering giving a lead role to Al Jolson, who was making Rose of Washington Square for the studio. This role eventually went to Ricardo Cortez.

The previous Moto film, Mysterious Mr. Moto, had finished shooting in April 1938. Filming on this one started in June 1938.

Virginia Field also appeared in the first film of the series, Think Fast, Mr. Moto. John Carradine had previously appeared in Thank You, Mr. Moto. Carradine's part was to have been played by Miles Mander but he was delayed by retakes on Suez and had to be replaced.

While filming a fight scene on the film, stunt man Harvey Perry was knocked out for five minutes.

When Ricardo Cortez made the film he announced he was retiring from acting and had signed to Fox as a director.

== Reception ==
The film was released in January 1939. The New York Times said Moto "belongs to the leisurely school of Oriental screen sleuths" whose slow technique is "a little tough on the audience" but praised the "rousing old fashioned climax". The Los Angeles Times gave the film "faint praise" saying it was "routine".

== Home media ==
This film, along with Mr. Moto in Danger Island, Mr. Moto's Gamble, Mr. Moto Takes a Vacation and (as a DVD extra) The Return of Mr. Moto, was released on DVD in 2007 by 20th Century Fox as part of The Mr. Moto Collection, Volume Two.
