= Brian Coburn (actor) =

Scottish actor (1936–1989)

- Born: 15 December 1936; Scotland
- Died: 28 December 1989 (aged 53); Shipston-on-Stour, Warwickshire, England

Brian Coburn (15 December 1936 – 28 December 1989) was a Scottish actor. His stage work included appearances with the Old Vic and the Royal Shakespeare Company, as well as in the West End. He appeared in more than eighty films from 1965 to 1989, until his death, aged 53.

== Filmography ==
Film
Year	Title	Role	Notes
1965	The Return of Mr. Moto	Magda—Hussein's Henchman	
1965	Carry On Cowboy	Trapper	
1967	Les grandes vacances		
1971	Fiddler on the Roof	Berl	
1971	Mary, Queen of Scots	Huntly	
1974	Carry On Dick	Scottish Highwayman	
1975	Love and Death	Dimitri	
1976	Trial by Combat	Lofty	
1983	Trenchcoat	Burly Salt	
1983	Octopussy	South American V.I.P.	
1984	Lassiter	Burto Gunz	
1984	Sword of the Valiant	Friar Vosper	

TV
Year	Title	Role	Notes
1979	BBC Television Shakespeare: Julius Caesar	Messala	
