= The Return of Mr. Moto =

1965 British film by Ernest Morris

The Return of Mr Moto
- Theatrical poster
- Directed by: Ernest Morris
- Written by: Fred Eggers
- Produced by: Robert L. Lippert; Jack Parsons
- Starring: Henry Silva
- Cinematography: Basil Emmott
- Edited by: Robert Winter
- Music by: Douglas Gamley
- Color process: Black and white
- Production company: Lippert Pictures
- Distributed by: 20th Century-Fox
- Release dates: 18 October 1965 (UK); 1 December 1965 (NYC)
- Running time: 71 minutes
- Country: United Kingdom
- Language: English

The Return of Mr. Moto (also known as Mr Moto and the Persian Oil Case) is a 1965 British second feature ('B') crime film directed by Ernest Morris and starring Henry Silva, Terence Longdon, and Suzanne Lloyd. It was written by Fred Eggers.

== Plot ==
Mr. Moto is enlisted by British intelligence to investigate a plot targeting a major oil company. He meets his friend Russell McAllister, an American oil executive, at a restaurant. McAllister explains that his company's operations in Iran are under threat due to sabotage, and the Shahrdar of Wadi is considering revoking the company's lease. As they leave the restaurant, McAllister is killed in a drive-by shooting. The car's driver, Coburn, and the assassin, "Dargo" Engle, pursue Moto, who is slightly injured. Moto evades them, and when Coburn follows him into an abandoned house, Moto defeats him and learns that he works for someone named "Dargo". When Coburn tries to escape, Engle kills him for cowardice, but Moto escapes by jumping from the roof.

The next day, Moto meets his Interpol contact, Charles Ginelli, and they identify "Dargo" as former SS officer Helmut Engle, a war criminal wanted for atrocities during World War II. Moto vows to avenge McAllister by killing Engle. Meanwhile, Engle is furious when his employers criticise his failure to eliminate Moto and vows to finish the job. Moto also meets Chief Inspector Marlow of Scotland Yard, who provides McAllister's briefcase. Inside, Moto finds a cryptogram. Marlow informs Moto that Inspector Jim Halliday will soon join the investigation. Later, Jonathan Westering of MI5 arrives and informs Moto that an upcoming summit of oil executives and diplomats will be held at his house. Moto agrees to collaborate and share information. Moto is later deceived by a man posing as Inspector Halliday, who claims to have an important contact at the Arabian Nights restaurant. Moto is captured and introduced to the conspiracy leader, Wasir Hussein, private secretary to the Shahrdar. After being tortured by Engle, Moto is thrown into the Thames with a brick tied to him, but he manages to escape. He then meets the real Halliday.

At the summit, American oil executive David Lennox arrives with his lover, Maxine Powell, who poses as his secretary. Lennox provides Moto with his company's codebook, which helps him decode the cryptogram. Moto advises Powell to claim she possesses important information during the summit, aiming to unsettle Hussein. At the summit, Moto, posing as a Japanese diplomat, persuades the Shahrdar to keep Lennox's lease instead of awarding it to Hussein's company. Unnerved, Hussein orders Engle to kidnap Powell. Under duress, Powell contacts Moto, leading him to the Arabian Nights. Moto confronts Engle there, outwitting and killing him. Before dying, Engle reveals that McAllister had been working with Hussein but was killed for getting too greedy. The Shahrdar, Halliday, and Hussein soon arrive. Having cracked the cryptogram, Moto exposes Hussein as the conspiracy leader. Westering arrives to congratulate Moto, but Moto reveals that Westering was also complicit in the plot. With the conspiracy dismantled, Moto invites Powell to spend the weekend with him.

== Cast ==
- Henry Silva as Mr. Moto
- Terence Longdon as Jonathan Westering, MI5
- Suzanne Lloyd as Maxine Powell
- Martin Wyldeck as Helmut "Dargo" Engle
- Marne Maitland as Wasir Hussein
- Brian Coburn as Magda, Hussein's Henchman
- Stanley Morgan as Inspector Jim Halliday
- Peter Zander as Charles Ginelli
- Harold Kasket as Shahrdar of Wadi
- Antony Booth as Hovath
- Gordon Tanner as Russell McAllister
- Henry Gilbert as David Lennox
- Richard Evans as Chief Inspector Marlow
- Ian Fleming as Rogers
- Denis Holmes as Chapman
- Tracy Connell as Arab
- Alister Williamson as Maitre D'
- Sonyia Benjamin as Dancer

== Critical reception ==
The Monthly Film Bulletin wrote: "Peter Lorre's quizzical little Japanese detective, here refurbished with a fashionably new James Bond-ish image as a member of Interpol, remains as enigmatic as ever and is rather well played by Henry Silva. Otherwise the script has more complications than excitement; and Ernest Morris' direction is curiously laboured, although the opening sequence of McAllister's assassination generates some tension. Henry Silva's impersonation of a Japanese businessman when he takes to disguise in the second half of the film (he plays his role as Mr. Moto without make-up) livens things up considerably."

The New York Times called it "extremely garrulous and inane".

== Home media ==
This film, along with Mr. Moto in Danger Island, Mr. Moto's Gamble, Mr. Moto's Last Warning and Mr. Moto Takes a Vacation, was released on DVD in 2007 by 20th Century Fox Home Entertainment as part of The Mr. Moto Collection, Volume Two, albeit as a DVD extra.
