= John Loves Mary =

1949 film by David Butler

- Theatrical release poster
- Directed by: David Butler
- Screenplay by: Henry Ephron; Phoebe Ephron
- Based on: John Loves Mary; 1947 play by Norman Krasna
- Produced by: Jerry Wald
- Starring: Ronald Reagan; Jack Carson; Wayne Morris; Patricia Neal
- Cinematography: J. Peverell Marley
- Edited by: Irene Morra
- Music by: David Buttolph
- Production company: Warner Bros. Pictures
- Distributed by: Warner Bros. Pictures
- Release dates: February 4, 1949 (New York City); February 19, 1949 (U.S.)
- Running time: 96 minutes
- Country: United States
- Language: English
- Budget: $1.346 million
- Box office: $1.5 million

John Loves Mary is a 1949 comedy film directed by David Butler and written by Henry Ephron and Phoebe Ephron. The film stars Ronald Reagan, Patricia Neal and Jack Carson. The film was released by Warner Bros. Pictures on February 19, 1949. It's based on a Broadway play of the same name written by Norman Krasna, which ran from February 4, 1947, to February 7, 1948, at the Booth Theatre and Music Box Theatre in New York City.

== Plot ==
John Lawrence (Ronald Reagan) is a returning GI. Mary McKinley (Patricia Neal, in her film debut) is the woman he left behind. But their reunion will have to wait: John has returned with English war bride Lilly Herbish (Virginia Field) in tow. It seems that John married Lilly as a favor to get her into the U.S., intending to go to Reno, Nevada and divorce her so that she can wed her true love, John's old pal Fred Taylor (Jack Carson). The plan is complicated by the unexpected arrival of Mary's parents, Senator James McKinley (Edward Arnold) and his wife Phyllis (Katharine Alexander). When John asks for the blessing of Mary's father to wed her, the senator insists that the wedding be held immediately. Later, John learns that Fred is already married and that his wife is expecting a baby.

John and Fred then come up with a scheme to put off John's wedding until he can get a divorce from Lilly. Fred pays off their former lieutenant, Victor O'Leary (Wayne Morris), to don his old uniform and pretend to order John to go to Reno on some Army business. The next day, Mary is so distraught at the thought of delaying the wedding that she insists her father use his political connections to get John out of his assignment. When John refuses to accept any special treatment, Mary leaves along with her parents. While they are gone, Lilly arrives and discovers that Fred already is married. Mary tries again to get John out of his assignment by asking General Biddle (Paul Harvey) to intervene, but John again refuses any such help. Mary becomes convinced that John does not love her and breaks off the engagement, forcing John to come clean and admit to the entire scheme. Lilly then reveals that she was married to Victor, but had received a letter purporting to be from his mother claiming that he had died from double pneumonia. An unwilling, and inebriated Victor is reunited with Lilly, and since Lilly's marriage to John is invalid he is free to wed Mary.

== Cast ==
- Ronald Reagan as John Lawrence
- Patricia Neal as Mary McKinley
- Jack Carson as Fred Taylor
- Wayne Morris as Lt. Victor O'Leary
- Edward Arnold as Sen. James McKinley
- Virginia Field as Lilly Herbish
- Katharine Alexander as Phyllis McKinley
- Paul Harvey as Gen. Biddle
- Ernest Cossart as Oscar Dugan

== Original play ==
The play was directed by Joshua Logan who called it "very light but terribly funny". He was introduced to it by Leland Hayward who was unable to produce it himself. Logan invested the play in partnership with Rodgers and Hammerstein, whom he invited in to thank them for Annie Get Your Gun. The play received good reviews — Logan said "Krasna had written and constructed a brilliant piece of machinery; I had simply staged it. Because of my admiration for him, a guilt set in that kept me from enjoying my success. I began to drink a bit."

== Reception ==
Bosley Crowther of The New York Times wrote a negative review of the film, finding that it "does not have the natural spontaneity nor the artificial smoothness of the play. Something has been subtracted in the transmission to the screen, and this time 'John Loves Mary' carries neither conviction nor charm." Variety, however, called it "a punchy laugh-getter ... Pacing of David Butler's direction is very sharp, whipping the laughs together in rapid-fire order as the visual and verbal gags are brought on. It's good fun, even at its silliest, with a minimum of sagging moments." Harrison's Reports declared, "A highly amusing romantic comedy-farce ... The story itself is thin and improbable, but these weaknesses are more than overcome by the many comical farcical situations that will keep audiences laughing throughout." The Monthly Film Bulletin wrote: "This film is good largely because of its witty and humorous dialogue. The portrayals are good, and Ronald Reagan and Jack Carson are amusing." John McCarten of The New Yorker called it "a thin war comedy on the stage and it's even thinner as a movie."

== Notes ==
- Logan, Joshua (1976). Josh, my up and down, in and out life. Delacorte Press.
