= The Jackpot =

1950 film by Walter Lang

- Directed by: Walter Lang
- Written by: Henry Ephron; Phoebe Ephron
- Based on: "The Jackpot" by John McNulty
- Produced by: Samuel G. Engel
- Starring: James Stewart; Barbara Hale; James Gleason; Fred Clark; Alan Mowbray; Patricia Medina; Natalie Wood; Tommy Rettig; Robert Gist; Lyle Talbot
- Cinematography: Joseph LaShelle
- Edited by: J. Watson Webb Jr.
- Music by: Lionel Newman
- Production company: Twentieth Century-Fox
- Distributed by: Twentieth Century-Fox
- Release dates: November 8, 1950 (Los Angeles); November 22, 1950 (New York)
- Running time: 87 minutes
- Country: United States
- Language: English
- Box office: $1,525,000

The Jackpot is a 1950 American comedy film directed by Walter Lang, with James Stewart and Barbara Hale in the lead roles and featuring a young Natalie Wood.

The screenplay is based on a John McNulty article titled "The Jackpot" that was published in The New Yorker on February 19, 1949. The story concerns the true experiences of James P. Caffrey of Wakefield, Rhode Island who won $24,000 worth of merchandise on the CBS radio quiz program Sing It Again.

== Plot ==
Indiana family man Bill Lawrence awakens from a fantastic dream to face the reality of his humdrum life as an employee at a struggling department store. He receives a random phone call from a representative of the Name the Mystery Husband radio quiz program inquiring about his availability and willingness to participate as a contestant later that evening. Bill is incredulous that the call is legitimate but his wife convinces him that it may be real, and soon their many friends become excited about the prospect. Bill receives a tip that the correct answer will be either bandleader Harry James or writer Charles MacArthur.

That evening, when the phone rings several times, Bill becomes increasingly nervous, and when the quiz program calls, Bill accidentally falls down the stairs and is barely able to speak. When the cryptic question, in the form of a quote, is asked of him, Bill flips a coin and correctly responds that the mystery husband is Harry James. Bill wins $24,000 worth of merchandise ranging from the useful to the absurd, including a side of beef, 7,500 cans of soup, 1,000 fruit trees, a Palomino pony, a portable swimming pool, a diamond ring, a French maid, an interior decorator and Greenwich Village portrait painter Hilda Jones.

Bill is later informed that he must sell the prizes in order to pay an income tax of $7,000. When he tries to raise the money by selling the merchandise at the department store, his boss fires him. When he tries to fence the diamond ring in Chicago, he is arrested. His wife suspects him of having an affair with Hilda. Dealing with these problems, he receives help from reporter Harry Summers, who had been writing newspaper articles about Bill and his winnings. Harry verifies his identity with the police and drives him home.

Lawrence laments winning the prizes. He arrives home and finds his home redecorated, and he packs his clothes and leaves, bunking with Harry. Hilda delivers the portrait of Amy, telling her that it was a surprise from Bill. A. lawyer arrives and speaks with Bill, who has returned. The lawyer gives him $5,000 for the diamond ring on behalf of the man who took it just prior to his arrest.

Mr. Woodruff arrives to rehire him as vice president of his store, but Lawrence strikes him and they are both knocked unconscious. Lawrence is rehired and his life returns to normal. The phones rings as Harry has set up a second attempt, as a joke, for Lawrence to win a prize. He employs colorful language to inform the caller that he is not interested.

== Cast ==
- James Stewart as William J. "Bill" Lawrence
- Barbara Hale as Amy Lawrence
- James Gleason as Harry Summers
- Fred Clark as Mr. Andrew J. Woodriff
- Alan Mowbray as Leslie
- Patricia Medina as Hildegarde Jonet
- Natalie Wood as Phyllis Lawrence
- Tommy Rettig as Tommy Lawrence
- Robert Gist as Pete Spooner
- Lyle Talbot as Fred Burns

Bandleader Harry James has a cameo as radio announcer.

== Reception ==
In a contemporary review for The New York Times, critic Bosley Crowther wrote:

Of the three or four bona fide farces that have come along this year (and we use that expression to distinguish from the fizzles and the unintentional ones), this manifest of the tribulations of a fellow who names the "mystery voice" and is deluged with fantastic prizes is by far the funniest. And in it our old friend, James Stewart—he of the homespun looks and the slow-poke ways—gives one of the most amusing performances of his career. ... [T]he hilarity becomes so intense that all you can think about sanely is preserving your jeopardized seams. ... [E]verything is managed in the most delightfully droll and clever style, thanks to an excellent creation in the comic vein by Twentieth Century-Fox. Phoebe and Henry Ephron have done a dandy script from a true-life story by John McNulty that appeared in The New Yorker magazine. Walter Lang has directed it briskly and the cast has played it so well that everyone deserves a mention, if not a whole paragraph. Mr. Stewart, of course, deserves the first one. He is what you might safely call superb with his slow takes, his beaming amazements and his sudden explosions of wrath.

Critic Philip K. Scheuer of the Los Angeles Times wrote:

It is possible the picture could have had more fun with the more outlandish of the gifts; but that would have necessitated a broader approach and the outright substitution of slapstick comedians for the fairly polite farceurs employed by 20th Century-Fox. Walter Lang, in his direction, follows a reasonably legitimate course throughout, though be cannot resist allowing Master Stewart to take a couple of Involuntary pratfalls down the stairs. When the humorous possibilities of the bonanza are well on their way to being exhausted, the writers apply first-aid complications ... These complications are more in the conventional Hollywood line but by then "The Jackpot" has paid off in laughs by a safe margin. It is 20th's happiest inspiration since "When Willie Comes Marching Home."

== Adaptations ==
A radio adaptation starring Stewart, broadcast on April 26, 1951 on NBC's Screen Directors Playhouse, received much press coverage because Stewart's costar was Margaret Truman in her debut as a radio actress. Her performance received middling reviews but she noted that her father enjoyed the broadcast.

== Awards ==
Screenwriters Henry and Phoebe Ephron, the parents of future writer and director Nora Ephron, were nominated for a Writers Guild of America Award.

== Home media ==
The film was released as a manufacture-on-demand DVD as part of the 20th Century Fox Cinema Archives on December 6, 2012.

== See also ==
- Champagne for Caesar
- Take It or Leave It
- Quiz Show
