= Desk Set =

1957 film by Walter Lang

- Original cinema poster
- Directed by: Walter Lang
- Screenplay by: Phoebe Ephron; Henry Ephron
- Based on: Desk Set; 1955 play by William Marchant
- Produced by: Henry Ephron
- Starring: Spencer Tracy; Katharine Hepburn; Gig Young; Joan Blondell
- Cinematography: Leon Shamroy
- Edited by: Robert Simpson
- Music by: Cyril J. Mockridge
- Distributed by: 20th Century-Fox
- Release date: May 1, 1957 (US)
- Running time: 103 minutes
- Country: United States
- Language: English
- Budget: $1,865,000
- Box office: $1.7 million (US rentals)

Desk Set (released as His Other Woman in the UK) is a 1957 American romantic comedy film starring Spencer Tracy and Katharine Hepburn. The movie has science fiction and futuristic themes on the impact of automation and artificial intelligence replacing human labor.

Directed by Walter Lang, the picture's screenplay was written by Phoebe Ephron and Henry Ephron, adapted from the 1955 play of the same name by William Marchant.

== Plot ==
Bunny Watson is a documentalist (research librarian) in charge of the reference library at the Federal Broadcasting Network in Midtown Manhattan. The reference librarians are responsible for researching facts and answering questions for the Network's programing, news, and promotional departments on all manner of topics, great and small. Bunny has been romantically involved for seven years with rising network executive Mike Cutler, but with no marriage in sight.

Methods engineer and efficiency expert Richard Sumner is the inventor of EMERAC ("Electromagnetic MEmory and Research Arithmetical Calculator"), nicknamed "Emmy," a powerful early generation computer (referred to then as an "electronic brain"). He is brought in to see how the library functions, and size it up for installation of one of his massive machines.

Despite Bunny's initial intransigence, Richard is surprised and intrigued to discover how stunningly capable and engaging she is. When her staff finds out the computer is coming, they jump to the conclusion they are being replaced.

After an innocuous but seemingly salacious situation that Mike walks in on at Bunny's apartment, he recognizes the older Richard has emerged as a romantic rival, and begins to want to commit to Bunny.

Bunny's fear of unemployment seems confirmed when she and everyone on her staff receive a pink "layoff" slip printed out by a similar new EMERAC already installed in payroll. But it turns out to have been a mistake – the machine fired everybody in the company, including the president. The network has kept everything hush-hush to avoid tipping off competitors that a merger was in the works. Rather than replace the research staff, "Emmy" was installed to help the employees cope with the extra work.

With the threat of displacement out of the way, Richard reveals his romantic interest to Bunny, but she believes that EMERAC will always be his first love. He denies it, but then Bunny puts him to the test, pressing the machine beyond its limits. Richard resists the urge to fix it as long as possible, but finally gives in and forces an emergency shutdown. Bunny then accepts his marriage proposal.

== Cast ==
- Spencer Tracy as Richard Sumner
- Katharine Hepburn as Bunny Watson
- Gig Young as Mike Cutler
- Joan Blondell as Peg Costello, Bunny's friend and co-worker
- Dina Merrill as Sylvia Blair, reference desk worker
- Sue Randall as Ruthie Saylor, reference desk worker
- Neva Patterson as Miss Warriner
- Harry Ellerbe as Smithers
- Nicholas Joy as Mr. Azae
- Diane Jergens as Alice
- Merry Anders as Cathy
- Rachel Stephens as Receptionist
- Ida Moore as long-term employee and model for the network's symbol

== Production ==
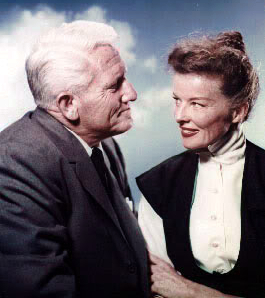
Spencer Tracy with Katharine Hepburn in a promotional image for Desk Set (1957)

In the play, Bunny Watson (played by Shirley Booth, who was originally intended for the film as well) had only brief, somewhat hostile interactions with Richard Sumner. Screenwriters Phoebe and Henry Ephron (the parents of Nora Ephron) built up the role of the efficiency expert and tailored the interactions between him and the researcher to fit Spencer Tracy and Katharine Hepburn.

The exterior shots of the "Federal Broadcasting Network" seen in the film are actually of the RCA Building (now known as the Comcast Building) at 30 Rockefeller Plaza in Rockefeller Center, the headquarters of NBC.

The character of Bunny Watson was based on Agnes E. Law, a real-life librarian at CBS who retired about a year before the film was released.

This film was the eighth screen pairing of Hepburn and Tracy, after a five-year respite since 1952's Pat and Mike, and was a first for Hepburn and Tracy in several ways: the first non-MGM film the two starred in together, their first color film, and their first CinemaScope film. Following Desk Set their last film together would be 1967's Guess Who's Coming to Dinner.

The computer referred to as EMERAC is a homoiophone metonym for ENIAC ("Electronic Numerical Integrator And Computer"), which was developed in the 1940s and was the first electronic general-purpose computer. Parts of the EMERAC computer, particularly the massive display of moving square lights, would later be seen in various 20th Century Fox productions including both the motion picture (1961) and TV (1964–1968) versions of Voyage to the Bottom of the Sea and the Edgar Hopper segment of the 1964 film What a Way to Go!.

The researchers furnish incorrect information about the career of baseball player Ty Cobb. Miss Costello claims his major league career lasted for 21 years, and that he played only for the Detroit Tigers. In fact, he played for 24 years—22 with Detroit, and his final two seasons with the Philadelphia Athletics.

There is a well-known "goof" in one scene. Mike gives Bunny an arrangement of white carnations, and she inserts one in his lapel's button-hole. At the end of the day, she and Richard leave the office. She is carrying the white carnation arrangement as they enter the elevator. As they exit the building, the carnations are pink.

== Reception ==
Bosley Crowther, film critic of The New York Times, felt the film was "out of dramatic kilter", inasmuch as Hepburn was simply too "formidable" to convincingly play someone "scared by a machine", resulting in "not much tension in this thoroughly lighthearted film".

The New York Post review was mixed: "There are such sops to sentiment as Miss Hepburn's willingness to be dragged altarwards by the young head of her department, Gig Young, who kindly lets her do her most impressive work, and a growing understanding between Hepburn and the rather remote and intellectually Olympian Tracy....Running true to form, the sex narrative follows a predictable pattern, rewarding honest virtue and slapping down the unworthy, and the other, scientific trail is permitted a twist that may surprise any who have found themselves emotionally involved in that timely problem of technological unemployment....'Desk Set,' let us conclude, is a shining piece of machinery brought to a high polish, and, delivered with appropriate performances, flourishes. Affection, though, it cannot inspire."

TIME magazine wrote: "At long last, somebody has a kind word for the girls in the research department. The word: one of those electronic brains could do the job much better and with less back chat—and what's more, it would free the girls' energies for the more important job of getting a man....Desk Set has been expanded [from the play] by a sizable pigeonhole, in which [Hepburn and Tracy] intermittently bill and coo....On the whole, the film compares favorably with the play....And though Actress Hepburn tends to wallow in the wake of Shirley Booth...she never quite sinks in the comic scenes, and in the romantic ones she is light enough to ride the champagne splashes of emotion as if she were going over Niagara in a barrel. Spencer Tracy has one wonderful slapstick scene, and Gig Young does very well with a comic style for which he is much beholden to William Holden."

The Philadelphia Inquirer was critical: "The middle-aged excesses of Miss Hepburn and Tracy...leave a good deal to be desired. Equipped with an insubstantial vehicle, bogged down by surprisingly flat-footed direction...the stars come close to being embarrassing as they bound through roles involving them in office nonsense about a mechanical brain, a bibulous Christmas party, an innocent, but suspecting, dinner in negligee Katie's rain-bound flat....Marchant's foolish little comedy gains nothing via the Phoebe and Henry Ephron adaptation. Long recitations from "Hiawatha" and "The Curfew Shall Not Ring Tonight," plus question-and-answer games...in addition to the repetitiousness of the central idea...turn 'Desk Set's' 104 minutes into an endurance contest for cast and audience."

Today the film is seen far more favorably, with the sharpness of the script praised in particular. It has achieved a rare 100% rating on Rotten Tomatoes based on 22 reviews, with a weighted average of 6.78/10. The site's consensus reads: "Desk Set reunites one of cinema's most well-loved pairings for a solidly crafted romantic comedy that charmingly encapsulates their timeless appeal". Dennis Schwartz of Dennis Schwartz Movie Reviews called it an "inconsequential sex comedy," but contended "the star performers are better than the material they are given to work with" and that "the comedy was so cheerful and the banter between the two was so refreshingly smart that it was easy to forgive this bauble for not being as rich as many of the legendary duo's other films together."

== Legacy ==
A Canadian radio program, Bunny Watson, was named for and inspired by Hepburn's character.

== See also ==
- List of American films of 1957
