= What Price Glory (1952 film) =

1952 film directed by John Ford

- 1952 Theatrical Poster
- Directed by: John Ford
- Screenplay by: Henry Ephron; Phoebe Ephron
- Based on: What Price Glory? 1924 play by Maxwell Anderson; Laurence Stallings
- Produced by: Sol C. Siegel
- Starring: James Cagney; Corinne Calvet; Dan Dailey
- Cinematography: Joseph MacDonald
- Edited by: Dorothy Spencer
- Music by: Alfred Newman
- Color process: Technicolor
- Distributed by: 20th Century-Fox
- Release date: August 22, 1952
- Running time: 111 minutes
- Country: United States
- Languages: English; French
- Box office: $2 million (US rentals)

What Price Glory is a 1952 American Technicolor war film based on a 1924 play by Maxwell Anderson and Laurence Stallings, though it used virtually none of Anderson's dialogue. Originally intended as a musical, it was filmed as a straight comedy-drama, directed by John Ford and released by 20th Century Fox on August 22, 1952, in the U.S. The screenplay was written by Phoebe and Henry Ephron, and stars James Cagney and Dan Dailey as US Marines in World War I.

== Plot ==
Upon the United States entry into World War I, the first American units to arrive at the front in France are veteran Marine companies, one of which is commanded by Captain Flagg, along with his lieutenants, Moore and Aldrich. Flagg developed a romantic relationship with the daughter of the local innkeeper, Charmaine, and resumes their relationship after returning from the front. However, he lies to her, saying that he is married when she wants to accompany him on his leave to Paris. Replacements arrive and their lack of discipline and knowledge infuriate the captain. But he is expecting the arrival of a new top sergeant, whom he hopes will manage to train them properly. However, when the sergeant arrives, it is Quirt, Captain Flagg's longtime rival, and their rivalry re-ignites.

Flagg leaves for Paris, and while he is away, Quirt begins to romance Charmaine. When Flagg returns, he is approached by Charmaine's father, Whiskey Pete, who expresses concern over his daughter's relationship with Quirt. Flagg becomes angry, as Quirt has previously moved in on other girlfriends of Flagg. But he sees this as an opportunity to get even with Quirt, by using Pete's concern to force Quirt to marry Charmaine, taking him off the market once and for all. As the wedding approaches, the unit receives orders to move back to the front lines. Flagg sees an opportunity to add insult to injury by not informing Quirt of the impending deployment, until after the wedding, which would mean sending Quirt into battle immediately after the ceremony.

While setting up Quirt's wedding, Flagg is approached by another of the new arrivals, Private Lewisohn, who wants to marry Nicole Bouchard, a local he has known for eight days. Flagg convinces him to wait. Brigadier General Cokely visits the unit before deployment, promising Flagg that if they can capture an Imperial German Army officer, he will allow the company to retire from the front, as well as giving a week's leave to Flagg. Flagg's surprise is spoiled, and Quirt refuses to marry Charmaine, offering Flagg the choice of taking him into battle or sending him to headquarters to be court-martialed. Flagg realizes Quirt's value in battle and takes him to the front lines.

At the front, Flagg's attempts to capture a live German officer lead to the death of Lieutenant Moore, after which a wounded Aldrich goads Flagg and Quirt in attempting to capture the officer themselves. On their way behind enemy lines, they both realize they love Charmaine, which re-heats their rivalry. The two capture a German colonel, but, while bringing him back to the American lines, they are hit by a German barrage, killing the colonel and wounding Quirt. Quirt taunts Flagg with the fact that he will be returning to the village first, giving him the first shot at Charmaine. Right after he leaves for the base hospital in the village, Lewisohn brings a German lieutenant he has captured to Flagg. The joy is short-lived however, as Lewisohn is killed by a German barrage after handing his prisoner over.

Flagg calls Cokely to tell him of the officer's capture, only to have Cokely renege on his pledge to withdraw Flagg's company from the front. As Flagg leads his Marines deeper into enemy territory, Quirt begins to woo Charmaine. Before the two can marry, Flagg returns from the front, confesses to her that he is not married, and proposes to her. Charmaine cannot decide between the two men, leading to a fight between them. The two decide to play cards for the right to marry Charmaine. Flagg wins, after bluffing Quirt, but before he can marry Charmaine, Sergeants Lipinsky and Kiper arrive and let Flagg know they have been ordered back to the front. After initially balking at the order, Flagg realizes he cannot desert his men.

As the Marines move out, Flagg tells Kiper that he has been discharged, and that he has kept the discharge hidden from him for over a year. Rather than become angry, Kiper slings his weapon over his shoulder and joins the Marines marching out. Quirt, meanwhile, can stay behind, due to his injury, but also picks up his rifle and joins his company.

== Cast ==
- James Cagney as Captain Flagg
- Corinne Calvet as Charmaine
- Dan Dailey as 1st Sergeant Quirt
- William Demarest as Corporal Kiper
- Craig Hill as Lieutenant Aldrich
- Robert Wagner as Private Lewisohn
- Marisa Pavan as Nicole Bouchard
- Max Showalter as Lieutenant Moore (as Casey Adams)
- James Gleason as Brigadier General Cokely
- Wally Vernon as Lipinsky
- Harry Morgan as Sergeant Moran (uncredited)
- Tom Tyler as Captain Davis (uncredited)
- Paul Fix as Gowdy (uncredited)
- Henri Letondal as Cognac Pete (Charmaine's father)

== Production ==
=== John Ford stage show ===
Ford had directed the play on stage in Los Angeles in 1949, as a benefit for the Military Order of the Purple Heart, of which Ford was commander. The roles of Quint and Flagg were played by Pat O'Brien and Ward Bond respectively; Maureen O'Hara played Charmaine and Gregory Peck and John Wayne played Lt Aldrich and Lt Cunningham. Harry Carey Jnr and George O'Brien were also in the cast. It toured throughout California in February and March, with performances given in venues such as Pasadena, San Jose, San Francisco and Long Beach.

=== Development ===
In June 1951 the Ephrons were reportedly working on a script, called Charmaine. It was originally slated to star Micheline Presle in the title role and Wayne reprising his role from the stage play. In September producer Sol C. Siegel said the film would be done as a musical. Dan Dailey had signed to star and James Cagney was being sought to play the other leading role. "The music won't be obtrusive", said Siegel. Corinne Calvet then signed to costar.

By October Cagney was set to star alongside Dailey and Calvet. Filming was to start December 10 at Camp Pendleton. At the end of that month John Ford signed to direct and the title changed from Charmaine back to What Price Glory. It was announced the film would have music in it but not be a musical. Cagney originally agreed to do the picture because it was supposed to be a musical. However, by the time he learned that Ford had decided to shoot it as a straight film, it was too late for him to back out.

Barry Norton played the role of Private Lewisohn in the 1926 original. He has an uncredited role as one of the priests in this remake. Marisa Pavan, the twin sister of Pier Angeli made her screen debut in this film as Nicole Bouchard. Paul Guilfoyle filmed an appearance but it was removed from the final cut.

Writer and film director Nora Ephron was the daughter of Henry and Phoebe Ephron, who wrote the screenplay for this film.

== Other versions ==
The film is a remake of the 1926 film also titled What Price Glory?, directed by Raoul Walsh and starring Edmund Lowe, Victor McLaglen, and Dolores del Río. Walsh also made a musical version of the film three years later, when sound films emerged, The Cock-Eyed World, again with McLaglen and Lowe playing the same characters, but featuring Lili Damita. In 1929 and 1931, Walsh directed Lowe and McLaglen in the same roles in two sequels, titled The Cock-Eyed World and Women of All Nations, respectively. A third sequel, Hot Pepper, with McLaglen and Lowe again reprising their roles and involving a woman named "Pepper" portrayed by Lupe Vélez, was directed by John Blystone.

== Reception ==
The film premiered in Atlantic City, New Jersey, on July 25, 1952. It received lukewarm reviews upon its release, which can be summed up in this quote from A. H. Weiler's review in The New York Times, dated August 23, 1952: "...despite some heroics and the monumental rivalry of its principals, a swiftly moving but not an especially distinguished offering."
