= Take Her, She's Mine =

1963 film by Henry Koster

- Theatrical release poster
- Directed by: Henry Koster
- Screenplay by: Nunnally Johnson
- Based on: Take Her, She's Mine; 1961 play by Henry Ephron and Phoebe Ephron
- Produced by: Henry Koster
- Starring: James Stewart; Sandra Dee; Audrey Meadows; Robert Morley; Philippe Forquet; John McGiver
- Cinematography: Lucien Ballard
- Edited by: Marjorie Fowler
- Music by: Jerry Goldsmith
- Distributed by: 20th Century-Fox
- Release date: November 13, 1963
- Running time: 98 minutes
- Country: United States
- Language: English
- Budget: $2,435,000
- Box office: est. $3,400,000 (US/ Canada)

Take Her, She's Mine is a 1963 American coming-of-age comedy film, starring James Stewart and Sandra Dee and based on a 1961 Broadway comedy written by the husband-and-wife team of Henry and Phoebe Ephron. The film was directed by Henry Koster with a screenplay written by Nunnally Johnson. It features an early film score by prolific composer Jerry Goldsmith. The character of Mollie, played by Elizabeth Ashley on Broadway and in the film by Dee, was based on the Ephrons' 22-year-old daughter Nora Ephron. The supporting cast features Robert Morley, John McGiver and Bob Denver.

In the film, a Californian lawyer happens to be an overprotective father to his teenage daughter. When she starts her college studies, her letters to him mention her beatnik friends and her conversion into an activist. The concerned father travels to Paris.

== Plot ==
Los Angeles attorney Frank Michaelson is overprotective concerning his teenage daughter Mollie as she leaves home for college and to study art in Paris. Concerned over the letters that Mollie has written describing her beatnik friends and activist beliefs, Frank travels to Paris to investigate her living situation.

== Cast ==
- James Stewart as Frank Michaelson
- Sandra Dee as Mollie Michaelson
- Audrey Meadows as Anne Michaelson
- Robert Morley as Mr. Pope-Jones
- John McGiver as Hector G. Ivor
- Bob Denver as coffeehouse singer
- Philippe Forquet as Henri Bonnet
- Monica Moran as Linda Lehman
- Cynthia Pepper as Adele
- Jenny Maxwell as Sarah
- Charla Doherty as Liz Michaelson
- Maurice Marsac as M. Bonnet
- Marcel Hillaire as Policeman
- Irene Tsu as Miss Wu
- Charles Robinson as Stanley

== Original play ==
The film was based on a popular play starring Art Carney. It was written by Henry and Phoebe Ephron based on Phoebe's correspondence with their daughter Nora, who was away at college. They wrote the script in six weeks and sent it to their agent. Both Josh Logan and Hal Prince wanted to produce the play, but the Ephrons selected Prince, as Logan had wanted big stars.

George Abbott directed the play version. Elizabeth Ashley, who played the daughter, said the play was originally about the parents but was adjusted during rehearsals and previews to focus more on the father-daughter scenes. She wrote Abbott "staged it interestingly like a musical, with a lot of short vignettes that cut in and out very quickly, but it was essentially a string of recognition jokes calculated to get laughs from the theater party ladies who were its natural audience. The big joke was the father's anxiety about his daughter's virginity. It was all cute and innocent, like a situation comedy on television."

Ashley said reviews were mixed but "because of Carney the play sold out".

== Production ==
The film rights were bought by 20th Century-Fox, which hired Nunnally Johnson to write the script. Johnson submitted a draft, but new studio head Darryl F. Zanuck demanded a rewrite with the last act set in Paris to lend the film more international appeal. Johnson later called the ending "a very lousy third act, all taken on the back lot and the French didn't understand that any more than the Americans either, by that time. But he (Zanuck) insisted on it."

The film was released on November 13, 1963, just nine days before the assassination of John F. Kennedy. A radio advertisement for the film aired on KLIF in Dallas, the site of the assassination, just a few minutes after the station's first news bulletin of the shooting. 20th Century-Fox quickly recalled all 350 copies of the film in order to delete a scene in which a character supposedly speaks with Jacqueline Kennedy.

== Reception ==
In a contemporary review for The New York Times, critic Bosley Crowther wrote:

Let's all be thankful that society is generally, if not entirely, free of such farcical types as the doting father played by James Stewart in 'Take Her, She's Mine.' And let's hope the screen will not be burdened for too much longer with such drivel as is in this old-hat Hollywood picture ... For here is a prime example of the magnification of absurdity in a supposedly adult person in order to coax a few low-level laughs. In the stage play, from which the film was fashioned, the father was silly enough in his concern for the way his older daughter was pursuing her college career. But here the old boy is downright dotty, and his daughter, played by Sandra Dee, is such a hideously vulgar young creature that she makes an average sensitive grown-up cringe. ... The only thing funny about this picture is the image it gives of the shape of the characters' heads.

According to Fox records, the film needed to earn at least $6,100,000 in film rentals to turn a profit but returned only $5 million, resulting in a loss.

== Bibliography ==
- Johnson, Nunnally (1969). Recollections of Nunnally Johnson oral history transcript. University of California Oral History Program.
