= Ed Koren =

American cartoonist (1935–2023)

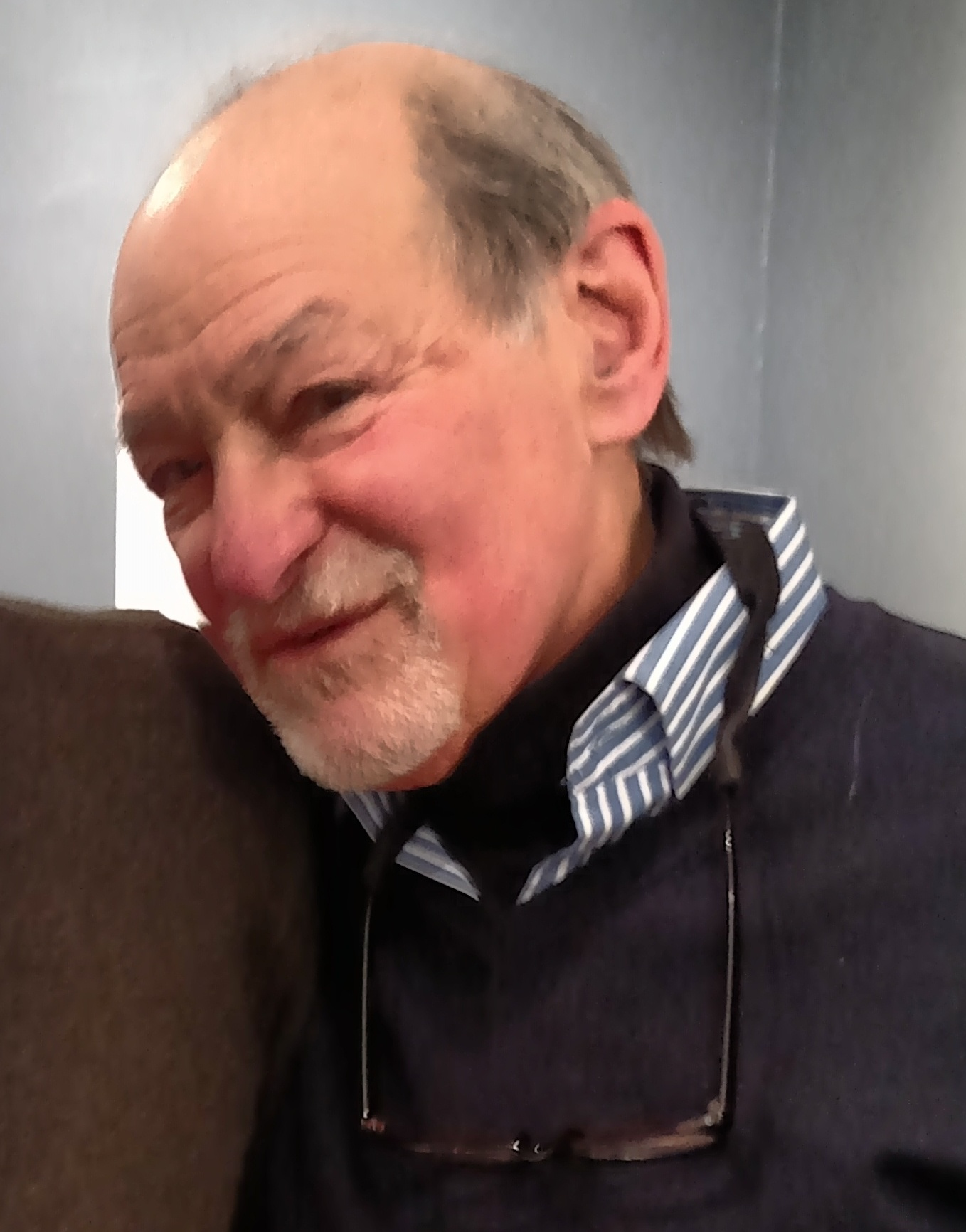
- Koren in 2015
- Born: Edward Benjamin Koren; December 13, 1935; New York City, U.S.
- Died: April 14, 2023 (aged 87); Brookfield, Vermont, U.S.
- Education: Columbia University (BA); Pratt Institute (MFA)
- Known for: Cartoons
- Children: 3

Edward Benjamin Koren (December 13, 1935 – April 14, 2023) was an American writer, illustrator, and political cartoonist, most notably featured in The New Yorker.

== Early life and education ==
Edward Benjamin Koren was born in a Jewish family in New York City on December 13, 1935, and attended Horace Mann School and Columbia University, graduating in 1957. He studied etching and engraving with S. W. Hayter at Atelier 17 in Paris, France, and received an M.F.A. from Pratt Institute in 1964.

== Professional career ==
Koren began his cartooning career at Columbia while drawing for the college's humor magazine. After college, he taught art at Brown University until 1977.

In May 1962, The New Yorker accepted one of Koren's cartoons featuring a sloppy looking writer, cigarette dangling from his lips, sitting before a typewriter. Printed on his sweatshirt is one word: "Shakespeare". The New Yorker went on to publish thousands of Koren's cartoons and illustrations, including dozens of full-color drawings published on the magazine's cover. After several years, Koren quit his teaching job at Brown University and devoted himself full-time to cartooning.

Koren contributed to many other publications, including The New York Times, Newsweek, Time, GQ, Esquire, Sports Illustrated, Vogue, Fortune, Vanity Fair, The Nation, and The Boston Globe. He collaborated with numerous contemporary humorists and authors, notably George Plimpton and Delia Ephron. Koren's cartoons, drawings, and prints have been widely exhibited in shows across the United States as well as in France, England, and Czechoslovakia.

Koren's political cartoons were not intended to speak to a specific political party; rather, they were made to portray the middle class's frustration with the government.

Columbia University's Wallach Gallery exhibited a retrospective of his work, "The Capricious Line" in 2010. Luise Ross Gallery (New York, NY) exhibited his work concurrently in the exhibition "Parallel Play – Drawings 1979 – 2010".

== Personal life ==
In 1961, Koren married Miriam Siegmeister. Together they had a daughter and a son. They were divorced in 1973. In 1982, he married Catherine Curtis Ingham. The couple had a son.

Koren resided with his family in Vermont where he was a member of the Brookfield Volunteer Fire Department, formerly serving as its captain.

He died of lung cancer in Brookfield, Vermont, on April 14, 2023, at the age of 87.

== Honors ==
Koren received a Doctor of Humane Letters degree from Union College, and received a John Simon Guggenheim Fellowship in Fine Arts in 1970. He received the Vermont Governor's Award for Excellence in the Arts in 2007. Koren was appointed Vermont's second Cartoonist Laureate in 2014, serving in the position until 2017.

== Selected bibliography ==
- Very Hairy Harry (2003)
- The Hard Work of Simple Living : A Somewhat Blank Book for the Sustainable Hedonist with Chelsea Green (1998)
- Quality Time : Parenting, Progeny and Pets (1997)
- A Dog's Life with Peter Mayle (1996)
- What about Me? : Cartoons from the New Yorker (1989)
- Caution : Small Ensembles (1983)
- Well, There's Your Problem (1980)
- Are You Happy? And Other Questions Lovers Ask (1978)
- Do You Want to Talk About It? (1976)
- Behind the Wheel (1972)
- Don't Talk to Strange Bears (1969)
