= Hallie Ephron =

American writer (born 1948)

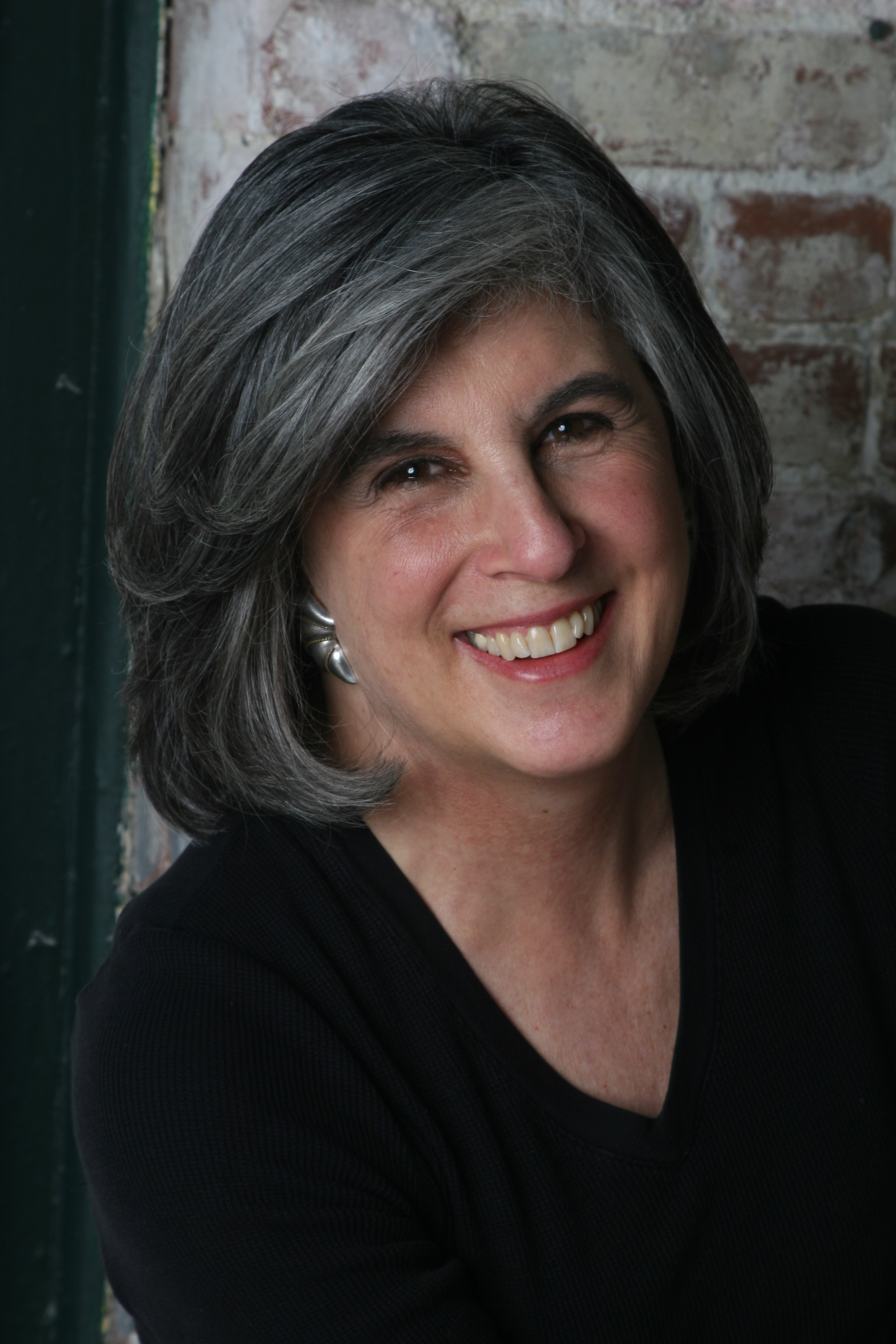
- Ephron in 2008
- Born: March 9, 1948 (age 78); Los Angeles, California, U.S.
- Occupations: Novelist, journalist
- Years active: 2000–present
- Spouse: Jerold Touger (died 2021)
- Children: 2
- Parent(s): Henry Ephron; Phoebe Ephron
- Relatives: Nora Ephron (sister); Amy Ephron (sister); Delia Ephron (sister); June Gale (stepmother)

Hallie Elizabeth Ephron (born March 9, 1948) is an American novelist, book reviewer, journalist, and writing teacher. She is the author of mystery and suspense novels. Her novels Never Tell a Lie, There Was an Old Woman, Come and Find Me, and Night Night, Sleep Tight were finalists for the Mary Higgins Clark Award. In 2011, Never Tell a Lie was made into a Lifetime television movie entitled And Baby Will Fall, starring Anastasia Griffith, Brendan Fehr, and Clea DuVall.

You'll Never Know, Dear was published in June 2017 by William Morrow and Company. Her how-to book, Writing and Selling Your Mystery Novel, was nominated for a 2006 Edgar Award with an updated edition released in 2017. She is also the award-winning crime fiction book reviewer for the Boston Globe and teaches fiction writing at writing conferences. For twelve years, Ephron reviewed crime fiction for the Boston Globe.

== Personal life ==
Hallie Ephron was born in Los Angeles, California, to parents Henry and Phoebe Ephron, both East Coast-born-and-raised screenwriters. She is the sister of Nora Ephron, Delia Ephron, and Amy Ephron. She graduated from Barnard College in 1969. She was married for 52 years to Jerold Touger, who died on August 6, 2021. They have two daughters. Her family is Jewish.

== Published works ==
=== Suspense novels ===
- Never Tell a Lie (2009)
- Come and Find Me (2011)
- There Was an Old Woman (2012)
- Night Night, Sleep Tight (2014)
- You'll Never Know, Dear (2017)
- Careful What You Wish For (2019)

=== Nonfiction ===
- Writing and Selling Your Mystery Novel: Revised and Expanded (2017)
- Writing and Selling Your Mystery Novel: How to Knock 'em Dead with Style (2005)
- 1001 Books for Every Mood (2008)
- The Bibliophile's Devotional (2009)

=== Dr. Peter Zak mystery series ===
Written by Hallie Ephron and Donald Davidoff under the name "G. H. Ephron"

- Amnesia (2000)
- Addiction (2001)
- Delusion (2002)
- Obsessed (2003)
- Guilt (2004)
