= Amy Ephron =

American novelist

- Born: Amy Laura Ephron; October 21, 1952 (age 74); Beverly Hills, California, U.S.
- Occupations: Screenwriter; producer; novelist; journalist
- Spouse(s): Alexander "Sasha" Harari (m. 1983; div. ??); Alan Rader (m. ??)
- Children: 3
- Parent(s): Henry Ephron; Phoebe Ephron
- Relatives: Nora Ephron (sister); Delia Ephron (sister); Hallie Ephron (sister); June Gale (stepmother)

Amy Laura Ephron (born October 21, 1952) is an American novelist, screenwriter, journalist, and film producer.

== Life and career ==
Ephron was born in Beverly Hills, California, to Phoebe and Henry Ephron, both East Coast born and raised screenwriters. She is the sister of Nora Ephron, Delia Ephron, and Hallie Ephron. Carnival Magic, her second novel for children and a companion to her first, was published on May 1, 2018, by Philomel, Penguin Kids. Her first novel for children, The Castle in the Mist was first published in 2017 by Philomel. It was an Amazon best book for kids 'pick of the month' and a Barnes & Noble pick for best book of the year. It has been nominated for a SCIBA Award. Her novel A Cup of Tea spent 37 weeks on the Los Angeles Times bestseller list and has been bought by Bruckheimer Films. Her novel One Sunday Morning received the Booklist Best Fiction of the Year award in 2005 and was a Barnes & Noble Book Club selection.

Ephron is a Contributing Editor and Contributor to Vogue and Vogue.com. Her stories and essays have appeared in The New York Times, House Beautiful, Saveur, Los Angeles Times, the Chicago Tribune, National Lampoon, The Huffington Post, etc. She is also the Executive Producer of Warner Bros′ Alfonso Cuaron's A Little Princess. As a film executive she worked on Born on the Fourth of July and Out of Africa, among others. She was also a non-broadcast Editor at the Children's Television Workshop, developing and producing toys and games for Sesame Street and The Electric Company.

She has been married twice, first to film producer Sasha Harari, with whom she has three children, Anna, Maia and Ethan, and currently to lawyer Alan Rader.

== Bibliography ==
- The Other Side of the Wall (2019)
- Carnival Magic (May 2018)
- The Castle in the Mist (Feb 2017)
- Loose Diamonds . . . and Other Things I've Lost (and Found) along the Way (2011)
- One Sunday Morning (2006)
- White Rose: Una Rosa Blanca (2000)
- A Cup of Tea: A Novel of 1917 (1997)
- Biodegradable Soap (1991)
- Bruised Fruit (1988)
- Cool Shades (1984)

== Filmography ==
- A Little Princess (1995) - Producer
