= Hanging Up =

2000 film by Diane Keaton

- Theatrical release poster
- Directed by: Diane Keaton
- Screenplay by: Delia Ephron; Nora Ephron
- Based on: Hanging Up by Delia Ephron
- Produced by: Laurence Mark; Nora Ephron
- Starring: Meg Ryan; Diane Keaton; Lisa Kudrow; Walter Matthau; Adam Arkin
- Cinematography: Howard Atherton
- Edited by: Julie Monroe
- Music by: David Hirschfelder
- Production company: Columbia Pictures
- Distributed by: Sony Pictures Releasing
- Release date: February 18, 2000
- Running time: 94 minutes
- Country: United States
- Language: English
- Budget: $40 million
- Box office: $51.9 million

Hanging Up is a 2000 American comedy drama film about a trio of sisters bonding over their curmudgeon father, with whom none are close. It is directed by Diane Keaton, who also stars alongside Meg Ryan, Lisa Kudrow, and Walter Matthau (in his final film role). The screenplay by Delia and Nora Ephron is based on Delia's 1995 novel. It was released in the United States on February 18, 2000, and received negative reviews from critics. Hanging Up was Keaton's final directorial effort before her death on October 11, 2025.

== Plot ==
Georgia Mozell is the editor of a successful self-titled women's magazine. Her sister Maddy is a soap opera actress who struggles with her sense of identity, while their middle sister, Eve Marks, balances her career with her family life with caring for their father. The three sisters continue to be affected by their parents' acrimonious divorce and their subsequent estrangement from their mother, Pat.

Despite being as busy with her own life as the others, Eve is the only one of the three who deals with the long-term hospitalization of their 79-year-old father Lou Mozell when he enters the early stages of dementia and has to be hospitalized. Lou has a history of alcoholism and womanizing, and, despite a hurtful incident years earlier, Eve takes charge of her father's care. In addition to answering his frequent, often incoherent phone calls, she visits him in the hospital nearly every day. Maddy occasionally visits as well, but also saddles Eve with the care of her large dog Buck. Eve is so distracted that she has a car accident with Dr. Omar Kunundar.

Flashbacks show Eve, Maddy and Georgia visiting Lou one Christmas after he attempted suicide after Pat left him. Eve confronts her mother, who admits that she had children only because she believed that having children was what was normal, but eventually discovered that it was not what she actually wanted out of life. She goes back to her father, and they go shopping together for a Christmas tree. Lou's joyful nature helps Eve to forget the pain of her mother's rejection.

In another flashback, Lou drunkenly crashes the birthday party of Eve's young son Jesse, and when Eve tells him to leave, he angrily tells her that she was a mistake. Eve's husband, outraged, forces Lou to leave and declares that he is no longer welcome in their house.

Overwhelmed with caring for her father, her sisters and an especially demanding client, Eve disconnects all the phones in her house on the advice of Omar's mother Ogmed after they talk to discuss what to do about the car crash. At an event that Eve planned at which Georgia is the keynote speaker, Georgia uses Lou's illness to promote her magazine and claims that she has been more involved in his care than she actually is. Afterward, Maddy, Eve and Georgia argue viciously until they are halted by the news that Lou's health has worsened.

The three sisters rush to the hospital and reconcile at their father's bedside. As they wait for Lou to emerge from a coma, they try to remember the name of an actress from the 1950s whose name Eve has been struggling to recall for weeks. Lou, who suddenly comes out of his coma, says, "June Allyson", and dies.

At the subsequent Thanksgiving, Eve, Maddy and Georgia are together in Eve's kitchen. Eve teaches Georgia how to make her stuffing recipe, which Georgia had previously stolen and given to a newspaper as hers. Georgia and Maddy begin to playfully throw flour at each other, and Eve takes a moment to enjoy being together with her sisters before joining the fun.

== Cast ==
- Meg Ryan as Eve Mozell Marks
  - Paige Wolfe as 6-year-old Eve
- Diane Keaton as Georgia Mozell
  - Katie Stratton as 12-year-old Georgia
- Lisa Kudrow as Maddy Mozell
  - Talia-Lynn Prairie as 4-year-old Maddy
- Walter Matthau as Lou Mozell
  - Charles Matthau as young Lou
- Adam Arkin as Joe Marks
- Cloris Leachman as Pat Mozell
  - Kristina Dorn as young Pat
- Jesse James as Jesse Marks
- Edie McClurg as Esther
- Duke Moosekian as Dr. Omar Kunundar
- Ann Bortolotti as Ogmed Kunundar
- Maree Cheatham as Angie
- Myndy Crist as Dr. Kelly
- Tracee Ellis Ross as Kim
- Stephanie Ittleson as Victoria
- Celia Weston as Madge Turner

== Reception ==
=== Box office ===
Hanging Up grossed $36.1 million in the United States and Canada, and $15.8 million in other territories, for a worldwide total to $51.9 million.

In the United States and Canada, the film grossed $15.7 million from 2,618 theaters over the opening four-day Presidents' Day weekend, finishing second behind The Whole Nine Yards. It dropped out of the top 10 in its third week of release, and lasted eight weeks in its domestic release.

=== Critical response ===
On the review aggregator website Rotten Tomatoes, the film holds an approval rating of 13% based on 86 reviews, with an average rating of 3.9/10. The website's critics consensus reads, "Though the screenplay and the novel it's based on were both written by the same person, critics say Hanging Up is an unsuccessful adaptation. The acting is praised as solid, but is ultimately unable to save the film." Metacritic, which uses a weighted average, assigned the film a score of 33 out of 100, based on 30 critics, indicating "generally unfavorable" reviews. Audiences polled by CinemaScore gave the film an average grade of "C" on a scale of A+ to F.

== See also ==
- The Pritzker Estate
