= June Gale =

American actress (1911–1996)

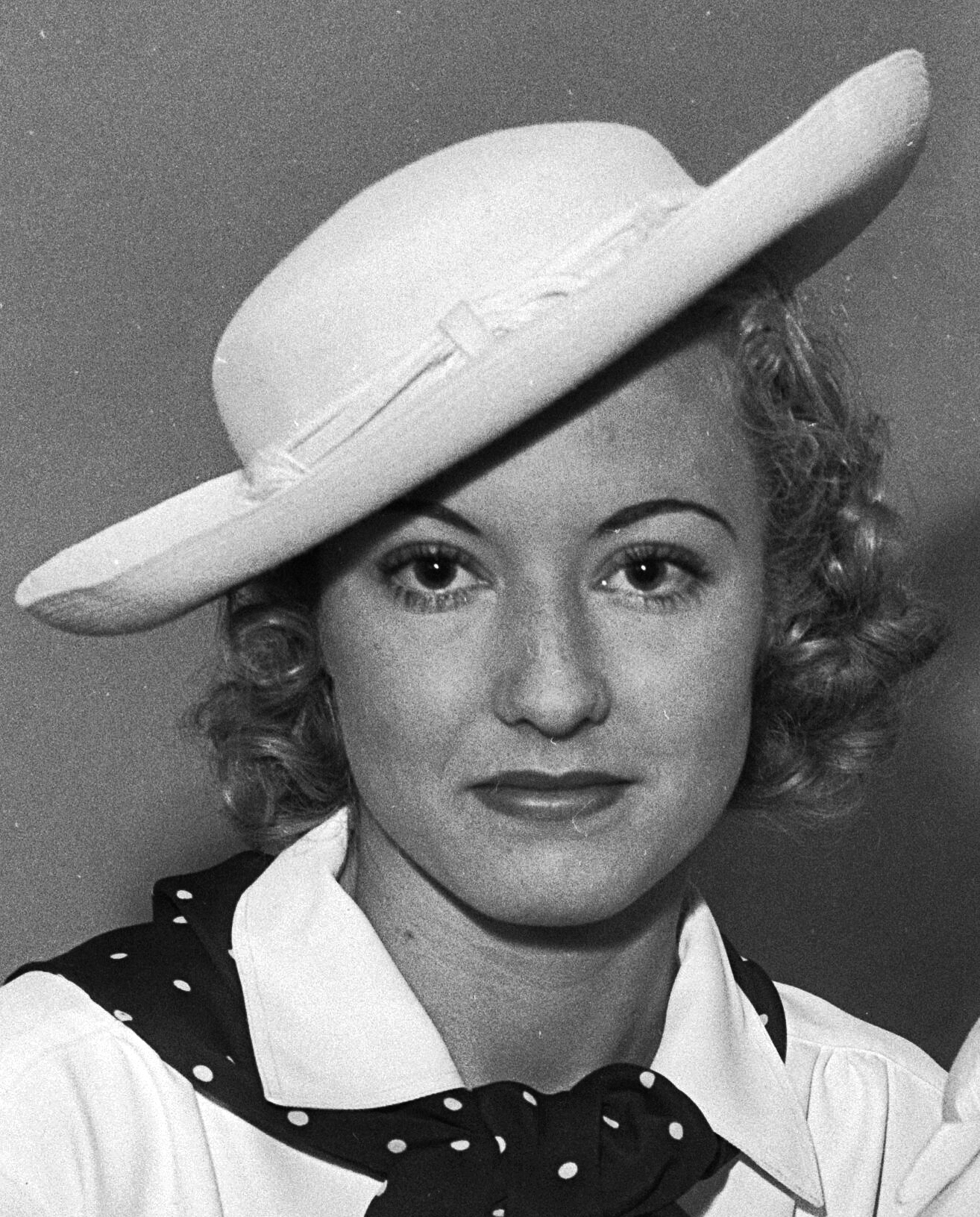
- Gale in 1935
- Born: June Gilmartin; July 6, 1911; San Francisco, California, U.S.
- Died: November 13, 1996 (aged 85); Los Angeles, California, U.S.
- Resting place: Pierce Brothers Westwood Memorial Park, Los Angeles
- Other names: Doris Gilmartin; June Levant
- Occupation: Actress
- Years active: 1932–1948 (film)
- Spouses: Oscar Levant (m. 1939; died 1972) Henry Ephron (m. 1978; div. 1985)
- Children: 3

June Gale (born June Gilmartin; July 6, 1911 – November 13, 1996) was an American actress sometimes credited under her married name as June Levant.

== Biography ==
Born in San Francisco, Gale rose to fame as part of the vaudeville act The Gale Sisters, a dancing quadruplet act that was actually two sets of twins. She appeared on Broadway with her sisters in Flying High (1930) and George White's Scandals (1931). In the early 1930s, she made her first films in Hollywood originally as a Goldwyn Girl in Roman Scandals, and gradually she rose to more notable parts, generally in B movies after signing with Fox in 1936.

In December 1939, Gale married Oscar Levant in Fredericksburg, Virginia, and they remained wed until his death in 1972. She later married Henry Ephron, thereby becoming the stepmother of noted writers Nora Ephron, Delia Ephron, Hallie Ephron, and Amy Ephron.

Gale was an integral part of two TV talk shows. After an on-air disagreement led to her leaving her co-host role on The Oscar Levant Show, she began her own show in 1958, with Lloyd Thaxton.

== Death ==
Gale died of pneumonia on November 13, 1996, aged 85, at Cedars-Sinai Medical Center. She was buried at Pierce Brothers Westwood Memorial Park in Los Angeles, California.

== Filmography ==
Title	Year	Role	Notes
1933	Roman Scandals	Goldwyn Girl	Uncredited
1934	Moulin Rouge	Show Girl	Uncredited
1934	Looking for Trouble	Long Beach Counter Girl	Uncredited
1934	Melody in Spring	Suzette	
1934	Bottoms Up	Chorine	Uncredited
1935	Folies Bergère de Paris	Girl in Secretary Number	Uncredited
1935	Rainbow's End	Ann Ware	
1935	Swifty	Helen McNiel	
1936	Heroes of the Range	Joan Peters	
1936	The Riding Avenger	Jessie McCoy	
1936	Sing, Baby, Sing	Member of Girls Band	Uncredited
1936	Pigskin Parade	Student	Uncredited
1936	One in a Million	Girl in Band	
1937	The Devil Diamond	Dorothy Lanning	
1937	On the Avenue	Chorus Girl	Uncredited
1937	Thin Ice	Member of Girls Band	Uncredited
1937	This Is My Affair	Girl with Keller	Uncredited
1937	Sing and Be Happy	Secretary	Uncredited
1937	You Can't Have Everything	Chorus Girl	Uncredited
1937	Wife, Doctor and Nurse	Nurse	Uncredited
1938	Four Men and a Prayer	Elizabeth	Uncredited
1938	Josette	Cafe girl	
1938	Keep Smiling	Secretary	Uncredited
1938	My Lucky Star	Cabot Jr.'s Secretary	
1938	Time Out for Murder	Muriel - The Apartment Switchboard Operator	
1938	While New York Sleeps	Kitty	
1939	Tail Spin	Flyer	Uncredited
1939	Pardon Our Nerve	Judy Davis	
1939	Inside Story	Eunice	
1939	The Jones Family in Hollywood	Alice Morley	
1939	It Could Happen to You	Agnes Barlow	
1939	Hotel for Women	Joan Mitchell	
1939	Charlie Chan at Treasure Island	Myra Rhadini	
1939	The Escape	Annie Qualen	
1939	The Honeymoon's Over	Peggy Ryder	
1940	City of Chance	Molly	
1948	Easter Parade	Minor Role	Uncredited
1962	The Alfred Hitchcock Hour	Saleswoman	Season 1 Episode 12: "Hangover" (credited as June Levant)
