= Swifty (film) =

1935 film directed by Alan James

- Theatrical release poster
- Directed by: Alan James
- Written by: Walton Farrar; Roger Allman
- Screenplay by: Bennett Cohn
- Produced by: Walter Futter
- Starring: Hoot Gibson; June Gale; George Hayes
- Cinematography: Arthur Reed
- Edited by: Carl Himm
- Production company: Wafilms
- Distributed by: State Rights
- Release date: December 15, 1935 (US)
- Running time: 62 minutes
- Country: United States
- Language: English

Swifty is a 1935 American Western film directed by Alan James, starring Hoot Gibson, June Gale, and George Hayes.

== Cast ==
- Hoot Gibson as Swifty Wade
- June Gale as Helen McNeil
- George Hayes as Sheriff Dan Hughes
- Ralph Lewis as Alec McNeil
- Robert Kortman as Clam Givens
- William Gould as Cheevers
- Wally Wales as Price McNeil
- Lafe McKee as Sandy McGregor
- Art Mix as Squid
