= Captain Newman, M.D. =

1963 film by David Miller

- Theatrical poster
- Directed by: David Miller
- Written by: Richard L. Breen; Henry Ephron; Phoebe Ephron
- Produced by: Robert Arthur
- Starring: Gregory Peck; Tony Curtis; Angie Dickinson; Eddie Albert; James Gregory; Bethel Leslie; Robert Duvall; Dick Sargent; Larry Storch; Bobby Darin
- Cinematography: Russell Metty
- Edited by: Alma Macrorie
- Music by: Frank Skinner
- Production companies: Brentwood Productions; Reynard Productions
- Distributed by: Universal Pictures
- Release date: December 23, 1963
- Running time: 126 minutes
- Country: United States
- Language: English
- Box office: $4.25 million (rentals)

Captain Newman, M.D. is a 1963 American comedy drama film directed by David Miller and starring Gregory Peck, Tony Curtis, Angie Dickinson, Robert Duvall, Eddie Albert and Bobby Darin. The film was co-produced by Peck's Brentwood Productions and Curtis' Reynard Productions. Darin earned nominations for the Academy Award for Best Supporting Actor and the Golden Globe Award for the same category.

The film is based on the 1961 novel by Leo Rosten. It was loosely based on the World War II experiences of Rosten's close friend Ralph Greenson, M.D., while Greenson was a captain in the Army Medical Corps supporting the U.S. Army Air Forces and stationed at Yuma Army Airfield in Yuma, Arizona. Greenson is well known for his work on "empathy" and was one of the first in his field to seriously associate posttraumatic stress disorder (years before that terminology was developed) with wartime experiences. He was a director of the Los Angeles Psychoanalytic Institute and was a practicing Freudian. Greenson is perhaps best known for his patients, who included Marilyn Monroe, Frank Sinatra, Tony Curtis and Vivien Leigh.

Major filming took place at the U.S. Army's Fort Huachuca complex in southern Arizona, with the co-located Libby Army Airfield used to portray the fictional Colfax Army Air Field. Captain Newman's office was in real life the Hospital Commanding Officer's office. An aquarium was added as well as the Cpt. Newman desk name plate. The rest of the office remained as it was.

The story was used as a 1972 television pilot of the same title produced by Danny Thomas Productions starring Jim Hutton in the title role and Joan Van Ark as Lt Corum.

== Plot ==
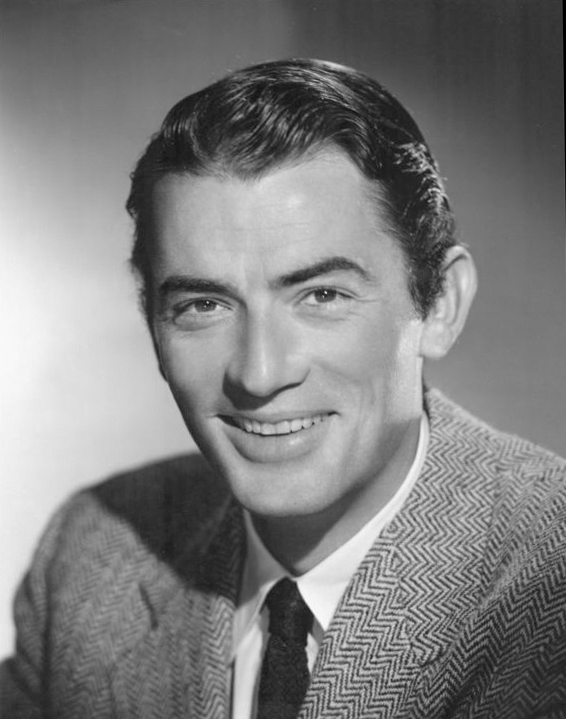
Gregory Peck plays Capt. Josiah J. Newman, M.D., MC, USAR, head of the neuro-psychiatric Ward 7 at the Colfax Army Air Field (AAF) military hospital.

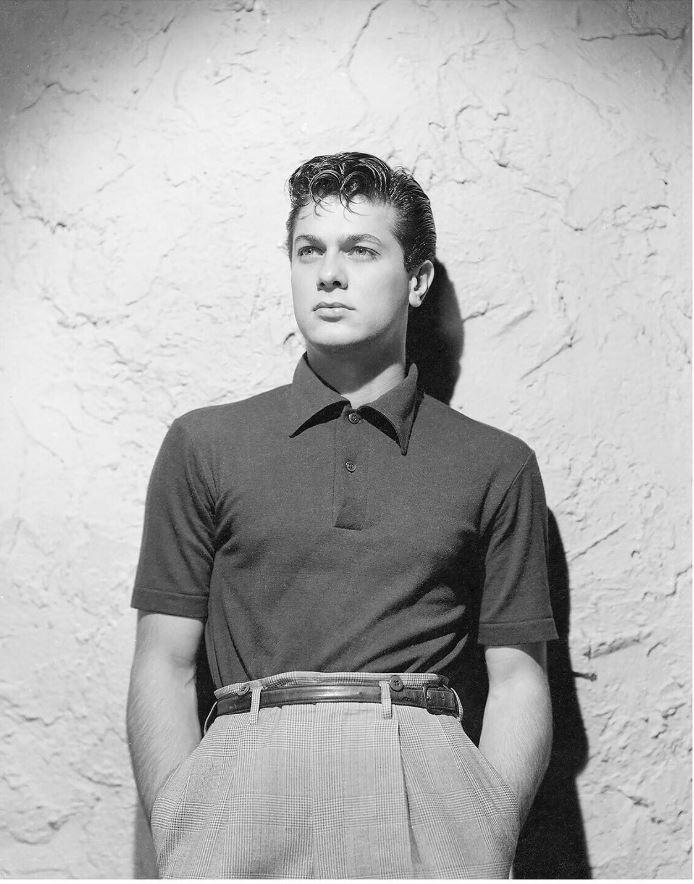
Tony Curtis plays Cpl. Jackson 'Jake' Leibowitz, USAAF, de facto boss of the orderlies, a wheeler-dealer from New Jersey, who makes even Newman’s unconventional methods look prosaic.

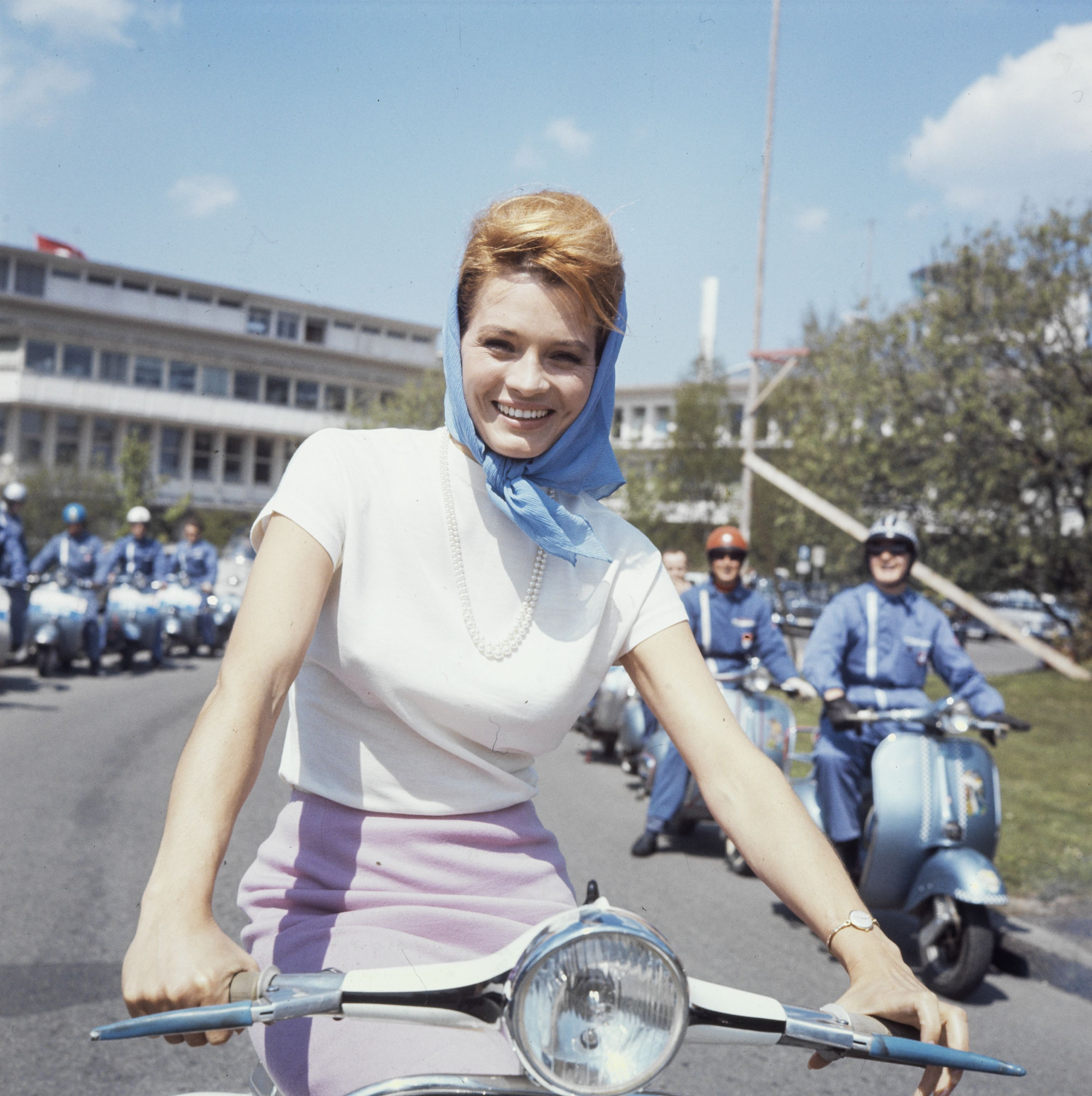
Angie Dickinson plays 1st Lt. Francie Corum, NC, USAR, who thinks Newman asks her on a dinner date... until Newman asks her to transfer to Ward 7.

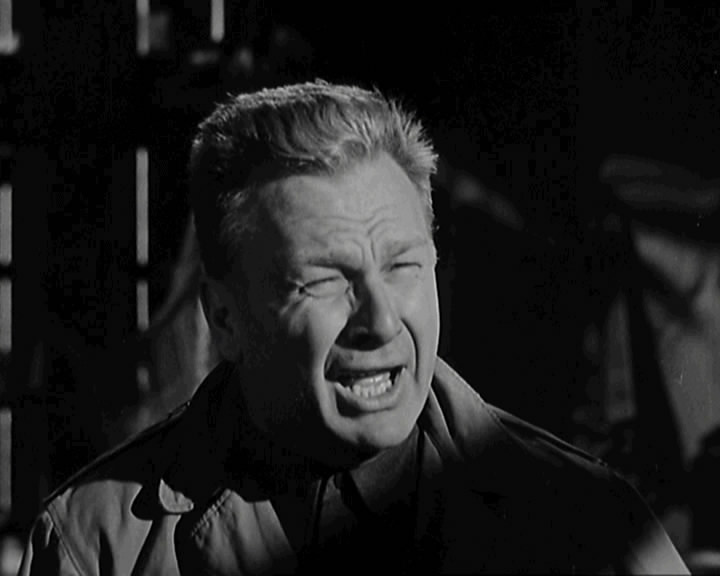
Eddie Albert plays Col. Norval Algate Bliss, USAAF, a “brilliant military tactician,” evaluated for an underlying medical condition when he displays erratic behavior related to a small social faux pas.

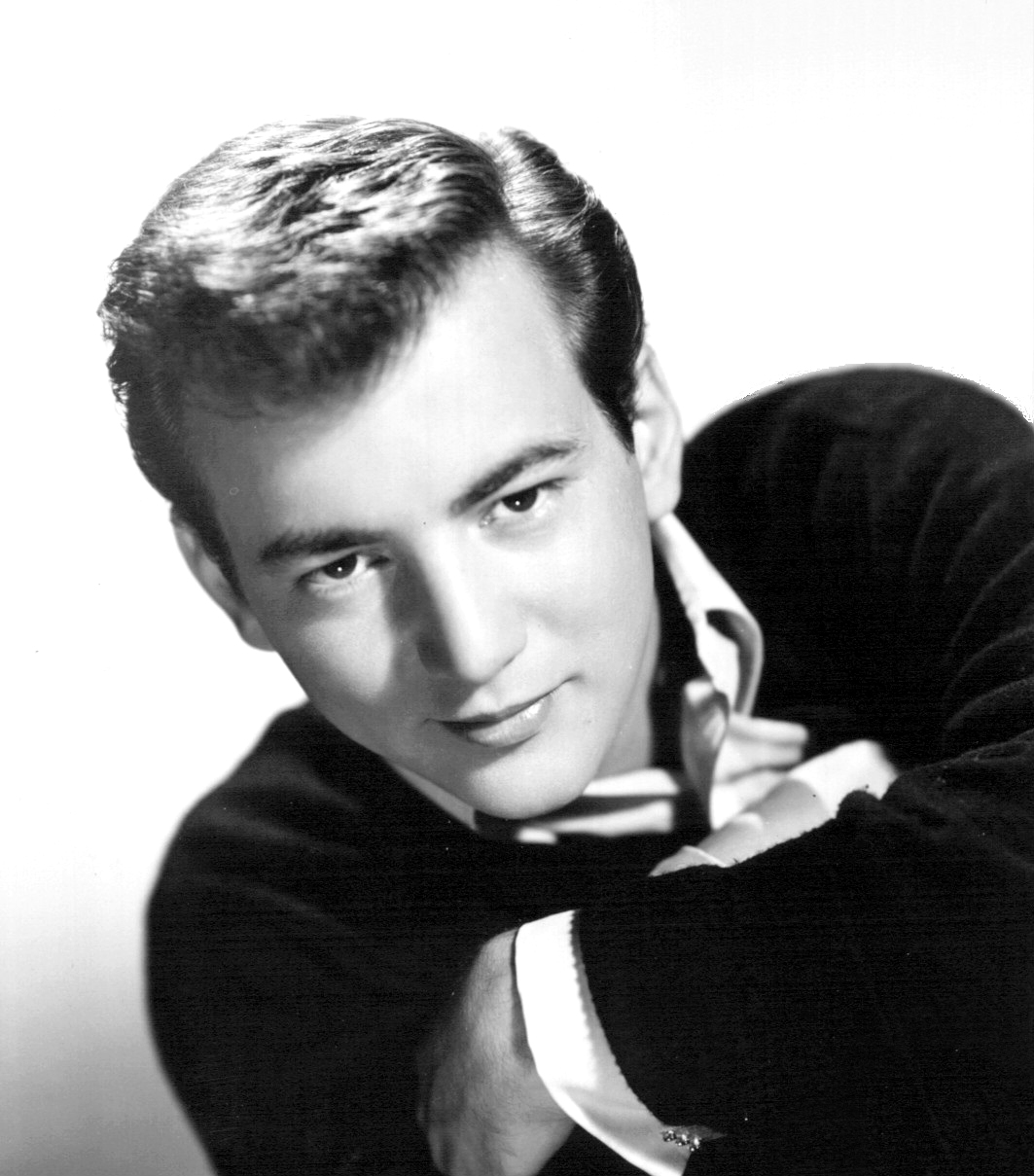
Bobby Darin plays Cpl. Jim Tompkins, USAAF, dealing with survivor’s guilt, he resists therapy, abusing alcohol to deal with a mind shattered by war experiences. He is antisocial and a disciplinary problem.

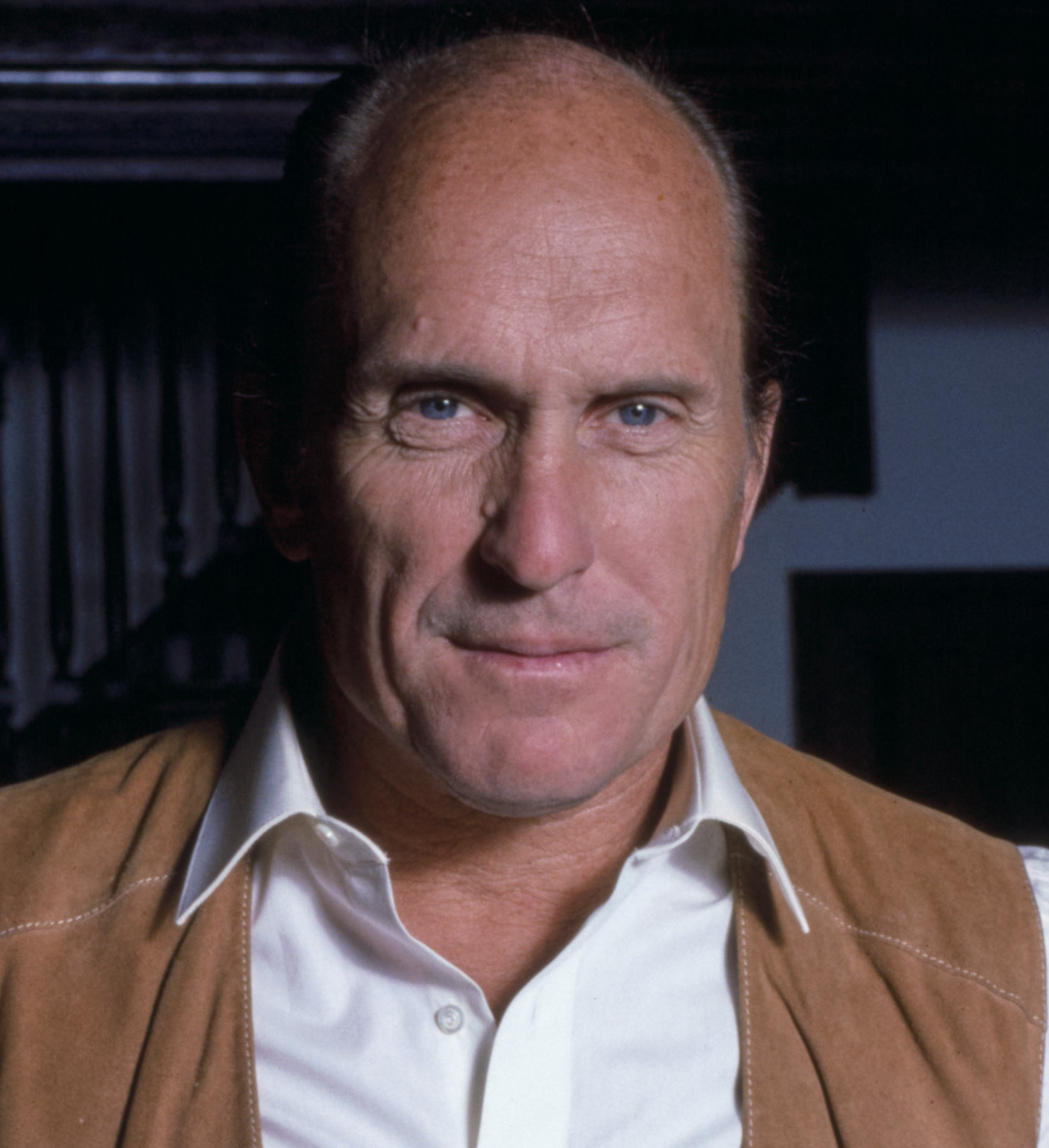
Robert Duvall plays Capt. Paul Cabots Winston, who is catatonic, overwhelmed with guilt for having evaded capture during the German occupation of a town.

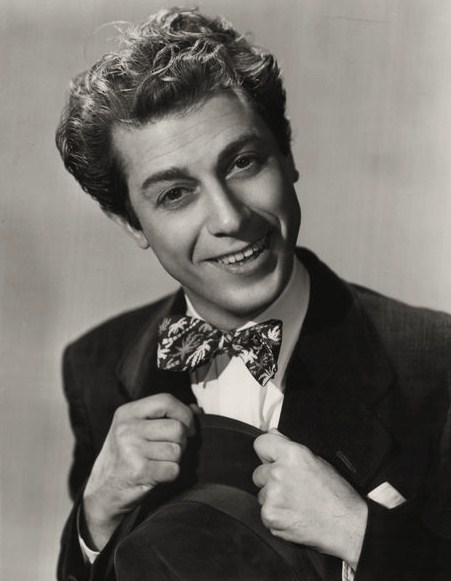
Vito Scotti plays Maj. Alfredo Fortuno, Italian POW Senior Officer. Colonel Pyser tells Newman the Italian POWs are not to receive therapy: “If they hate their fathers, that’s all right with us.”

In 1944, psychiatrist Captain Josiah Newman is head of the neuro-psychiatric Ward 7 at the Colfax Army Air Field (AAF) military hospital, located in the Arizona desert. As Newman explains to a representative from the air surgeon's office, "We're short of beds, doctors, orderlies, nurses, everything ... except patients." In response to “an alarming increase in neuropsychiatric cases”, Newman uses unconventional methods to treat his patients, including shell-shocked, schizophrenic, and catatonic cases, often previously minimized as military fatigue. At Newman's insistence, despite resistance from superiors, Colonel Bliss, a "brilliant military tactician," is evaluated for an underlying medical condition when he displays erratic behavior related to a small social faux pas.

To recruit much needed personnel, Newman hijacks a reluctant, experienced orderly, Corporal Jackson Leibowitz, a wheeler-dealer from New Jersey, who makes even Newman's unconventional methods look prosaic. Leibowitz promptly has the entire ward participating in a sing-along of "Old MacDonald Had a Farm." He purloins supplies and gifts from family of military personnel to give treats to his patients, including stealing Corporal Gavoni's Christmas salami and chopping off the top 5 ft of the base's 20-ft Christmas tree to provide a tree for his ward (the severed treetop was cut with a surgical saw and conveyed furtively on a stretcher in an ambulance).

Newman also courts nurse Lieutenant Francie Corum on what she thinks is a date... until he asks her to transfer to Ward 7. Meanwhile, Colonel Bliss forces his way into Ward 7, with a 6-inch knife, looking for Dr. Newman because Newman blocked his return to active duty after witnessing his erratic behavior. After watching Newman's handling of this situation and other patients on the ward, Corum transfers in.

A schizophrenic patient, Colonel Bliss compulsively repeats commands to the men of a squadron he led in New Guinea and ordered many to their doom in combat as well as speaking in alliteration ("babbling brightly" he is "bored with being beleaguered with brainless benighted blockheads"). As his alter ego, "Mr. Future," he leaves his medical hearing abruptly and climbs the base water tower, Newman climbing the tower after him to try and calm and reason with him. Unfortunately, Bliss suicidally jumps off the base water tower to be with his men.

Traumatized Corporal Jim Tompkins, an Eighth Air Force air gunner, who abuses alcohol to deal with a mind shattered by war experiences, is antisocial and a disciplinary problem. Dealing with survivor's guilt, he resists therapy until his condition becomes unbearable. Administered sodium pentothal, he relives the experience of being shot down in a plane, stumbling his way out of wreck before it blew up, and then finding his best friend dead with his head blown off. After treatment, Tompkins is sent back to active duty, though Newman is later dismayed to receive notice of Tompkins's death in combat.

Captain Paul Winston is catatonic, overwhelmed with guilt for having evaded capture during the German occupation of a town. Trapped and hiding "safely" for 13 months in a cellar went against his unrealistically rigid notions of bravery. Therapy includes advising his unemotional wife, who holds conservative values, on how to reassure him that she loves him, recognizing his bravery and endurance.

Through all these challenges, Francie Corum provides comforting nursing support to the patients, as well as professional and personal support to Newman as they draw closer.

Newman is bedeviled by Colfax AAF's "old-school" base commander, Colonel Pyser, who ultimately saddles him with a complement of 14 Italian POWs because his is the only secure ward where they can be held that meets regulations (captured in the Libyan Desert the POWs must be held in a similar climate like Arizona). Colonel Pyser tells Newman they are not to receive therapy: "If they hate their fathers, that's all right with us." True to his usual resourcefulness, Leibowitz speaks Italian ("In the neighborhood I came from you had to know six different languages to do business.") and takes the POWs under his wing. The POWs lend comic relief for the Christmas pageant when Leibowitz teaches "The Caroling Carusos" an "old American Indian song" and they unwittingly sing "Hava Nagila," to the audience's amusement and applause.

In addition, a flock of straying sheep, kept for the medical lab, that wanders onto the airfield and a group of feuding orderlies keep life interesting right up to the end of the war.

== Cast ==
- Gregory Peck as Capt. Josiah J. Newman, M.D., MC, USAR
- Tony Curtis as Cpl. Jackson 'Jake' Leibowitz, USAAF, de facto boss of the orderlies
- Angie Dickinson as 1st Lt. Francie Corum, NC, USAR
- Eddie Albert as Col. Norval Algate Bliss, USAAF
- Bobby Darin as Cpl. Jim Tompkins, USAAF
- Robert Duvall as Capt. Paul Cabots Winston, USAAF
- Bethel Leslie as Mrs Helene Winston
- James Gregory as Col. Edgar Pyser, USAAF
- Dick Sargent as 1st Lt. Belden 'Barney' Alderson, MAC, USAR
- Larry Storch as Cpl. Gavoni
- Jane Withers as 1st Lt. Grace Blodgett, NC, USAR
- Vito Scotti as Maj. Alfredo Fortuno, Italian POW Senior Officer
- Gregory Walcott as Capt. Howard
- Robert F. Simon as Col. M. B. Larrabee
- Paul Carr as Arthur Werbel
- Charlie Briggs as Gorkow
- Barry Atwater as Major Dawes

== Awards and nominations ==
The film was nominated for three Academy Awards.

- Best Supporting Actor (nomination) – Bobby Darin
- Best Sound – Waldon O. Watson
- Writing (Screenplay – based on material from another medium) — Richard L. Breen, Henry Ephron, Phoebe Ephron

== 1972 TV pilot ==
An attempt was made to turn the film into a TV sitcom by Thomas-Crenna Productions, the company of Danny Thomas and Richard Crenna. A pilot was shot in 1972, written by Frank Tarloff. It aired on ABC on August 19, 1972, as part of its unsold pilot anthology, ABC Comedy Showcase. The Los Angeles Times said "it was easy to see why it was never sold."

=== Cast ===
- Jim Hutton as Captain Newman
- Joan Van Ark as Lt Francie Corwin
- Bill Fiore as Captain Norval Bliss

== See also ==
- List of American films of 1963
