= Fred Clark =

American actor (1914–1968)

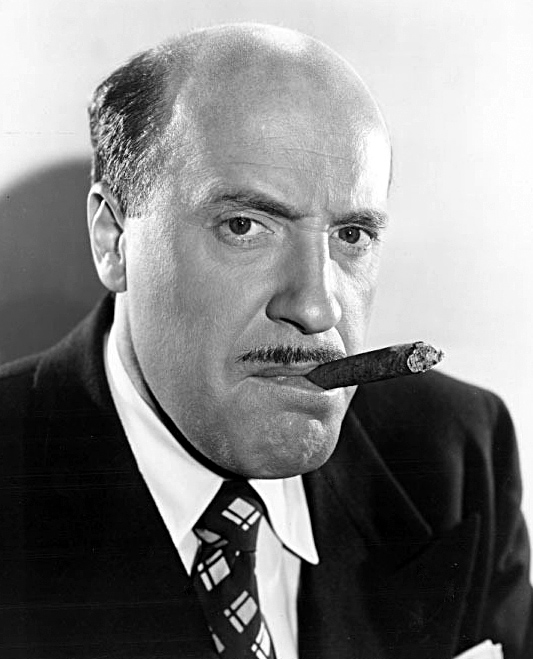
- Clark in 1950
- Born: Frederick Leonard Clark; March 19, 1914; Lincoln, California, U.S.
- Died: December 5, 1968 (aged 54); Santa Monica, California, U.S.
- Occupation: Actor
- Years active: 1938–1968
- Spouses: Benay Venuta (m. 1952; div. 1962); Gloria Glaser (m. 1966)

Frederick Leonard Clark (March 19, 1914 – December 5, 1968) was an American movie and television character actor, often playing in authoritative roles.

== Early years ==
Clark was born in Lincoln, California, the son of Fred Clark Sr. He attended Stanford University, with plans to become a doctor, but participation with a college production of Yellow Jack diverted his attention to acting. He changed his major to drama and later received a scholarship to the American Academy of Dramatic Arts. While there, he was elected his class's most promising actor.

== Career ==
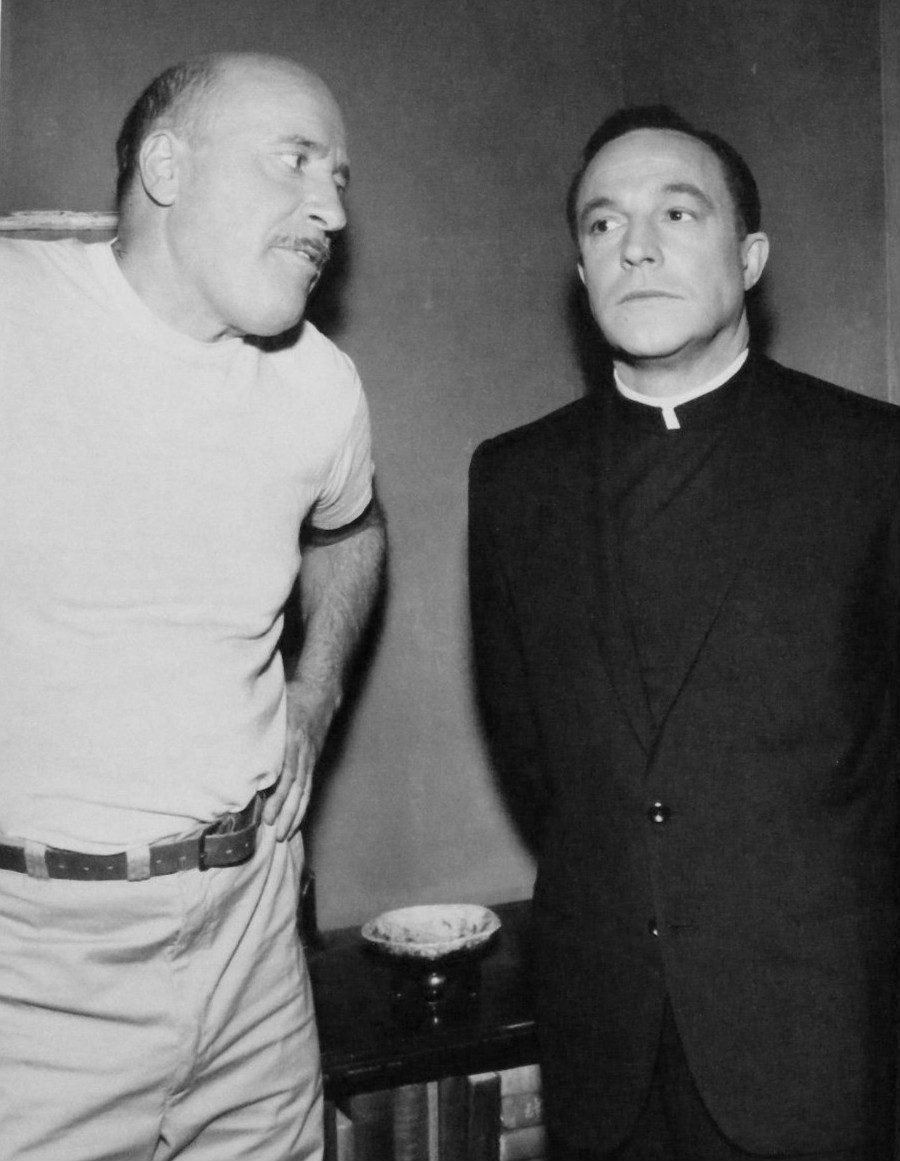
Clark with Gene Kelly in the Going My Way television episode, "A Matter of Principle" (1962).

Among his movies were Ride the Pink Horse (1947), Mr. Peabody and the Mermaid (1948), Flamingo Road (1949), White Heat (1949), Sunset Boulevard (1950), A Place in the Sun (1951), How to Marry a Millionaire (1953), The Court-Martial of Billy Mitchell (1955), How to Be Very, Very Popular (1955), Daddy Long Legs (1955), Auntie Mame (1958), and Visit to a Small Planet (1960).

Although he continued performing in movies during the 1960s (including a role in Hammer Film Productions' The Curse of the Mummy's Tomb in 1964 and John Goldfarb, Please Come Home in 1965) he performed more often for television, as a regular on The George Burns and Gracie Allen Show as neighbor Harry Morton (until 1953), and guest roles for The Twilight Zone, The Beverly Hillbillies, Going My Way, The Addams Family, and I Dream of Jeannie. In 1962, he and Bea Benaderet, another Burns and Allen veteran, played Mr. and Mrs. Springer in the episode "Continental Dinner," the series finale of the CBS situation comedy Pete and Gladys, featuring Harry Morgan and Cara Williams. Clark had a regular role in the 1966 ABC sitcom The Double Life of Henry Phyfe as the "Central Intelligence Service" boss of a hapless conscripted spy played by Red Buttons.

Clark's Broadway stage credits included Absence of a Cello (1964), Viva Madison Avenue! (1960), Romanoff And Juliet (1957), Ringside Seat (1938), What A Life (1938), and Schoolhouse on the Lot (1938).

== Personal life and death ==
Clark was married to actress Benay Venuta from 1952–1962, then model Gloria Glaser from 1966 until his death from complications of liver disease in Santa Monica, California.

Clark has a star on the Hollywood Walk of Fame for his work for television, at 1711 Vine Street.

== Complete filmography ==
- The Unsuspected (1947) - Richard Donovan
- Ride the Pink Horse (1947) - Frank Hugo
- Fury at Furnace Creek (1948) - Bird
- Hazard (1948) - Lonnie Burns
- Two Guys from Texas (1948) - Dr. Straeger
- Cry of the City (1948) - Lt Collins
- Alias Nick Beal (1949) - Frankie Faulkner
- The Younger Brothers (1949) - Daniel Ryckman
- Flamingo Road (1949) - Doc Waterson
- White Heat (1949) - The Trader, aka Daniel Winston
- So You Want to Get Rich Quick (1949, Short) - Fastidious Ferguson (uncredited)
- So You Want to Be an Actor (1949, Short) - Mr. Frisbee (uncredited)
- The Lady Takes a Sailor (1949) - Victor Santell (uncredited)
- The Amazing Mr. Malone (1950, TV Movie)
- Return of the Frontiersman (1950) - Ryan
- The Eagle and the Hawk (1950) - Basil Danzeeger
- Sunset Boulevard (1950) - Sheldrake
- The Jackpot (1950) - Mr. Andrew J. Woodruff
- Mrs. O'Malley and Mr. Malone (1950) - Tim Marino
- The Lemon Drop Kid (1951) - Moose Moran
- A Place in the Sun (1951) - Bellows
- Hollywood Story (1951) - Sam Collyer
- Meet Me After the Show (1951) - Timothy 'Tim' Wayne
- Three for Bedroom "C" (1952) - Johnny Pizer
- Dreamboat (1952) - Sam Levitt
- The Stars Are Singing (1953) - McDougall
- The Caddy (1953) - Mr. Baxter / Old Skinhead
- Here Come the Girls (1953) - Harry Fraser
- How to Marry a Millionaire (1953) - Waldo Brewster
- Living It Up (1954) - Oliver Stone
- Abbott and Costello Meet the Keystone Kops (1955) - Joseph Gorman, aka Sergei Toumanoff
- Daddy Long Legs (1955) - Griggs
- How to Be Very, Very Popular (1955) - B.J. Marshall
- The Court-Martial of Billy Mitchell (1955) - Col. Moreland
- Miracle in the Rain (1956) - Steven Jalonik
- The Birds and the Bees (1956) - Horace Hamilton
- The Solid Gold Cadillac (1956) - Clifford Snell
- Back from Eternity (1956) - Crimp
- Joe Butterfly (1957) - Col. E.E. Fuller
- The Fuzzy Pink Nightgown (1957) - Police Sergeant McBride
- Don't Go Near the Water (1957) - Lt. Cmdr. Clinton T. Nash
- Mardi Gras (1958) - Al Curtis
- Auntie Mame (1958) - Dwight Babcock
- The Mating Game (1959) - Oliver Kelsey
- It Started with a Kiss (1959) - Maj. Gen. Tim O'Connell
- Visit to a Small Planet (1960) - Maj. Roger Putnam Spelding
- Bells Are Ringing (1960) - Larry Hastings
- The Passionate Thief (1960) - L'americano
- La moglie di mio marito (1961) - Mr. Bietti
- A porte chiuse (1961) - Xatis, il procuratore generale
- My Darling Judge (1961, TV Movie)
- Boys' Night Out (1962) - Mr. Bohannon
- Hemingway's Adventures of a Young Man (1962) - Mr. Turner
- Zotz! (1962) - Gen. Bullivar
- Young Girls of Good Families (1963) - Mr. Whitehall
- Move Over, Darling (1963) - Mr. Codd (Hotel Manager)
- The Curse of the Mummy's Tomb (1964) - Alexander King
- John Goldfarb, Please Come Home! (1965) - Heinous Overreach
- Sergeant Deadhead (1965) - General Rufus Fogg
- When the Boys Meet the Girls (1965) - Bill Dennis
- Dr. Goldfoot and the Bikini Machine (1965) - D.J. Pevney
- Due Marines e un Generale (1965) - Gen. Zacharias
- Eve (1968) - Lucky Burke
- Skidoo (1968) - A Tower Guard (released posthumously)
- The Horse in the Gray Flannel Suit (1968) - Tom Dugan (released posthumously)
- I Sailed to Tahiti with an All Girl Crew (1969) - "Generous" Josh (released posthumously)
- Eddie (1971, TV Movie) - Chief Pike (final film role; released posthumously)
