= Delia Ephron =

American writer and film producer

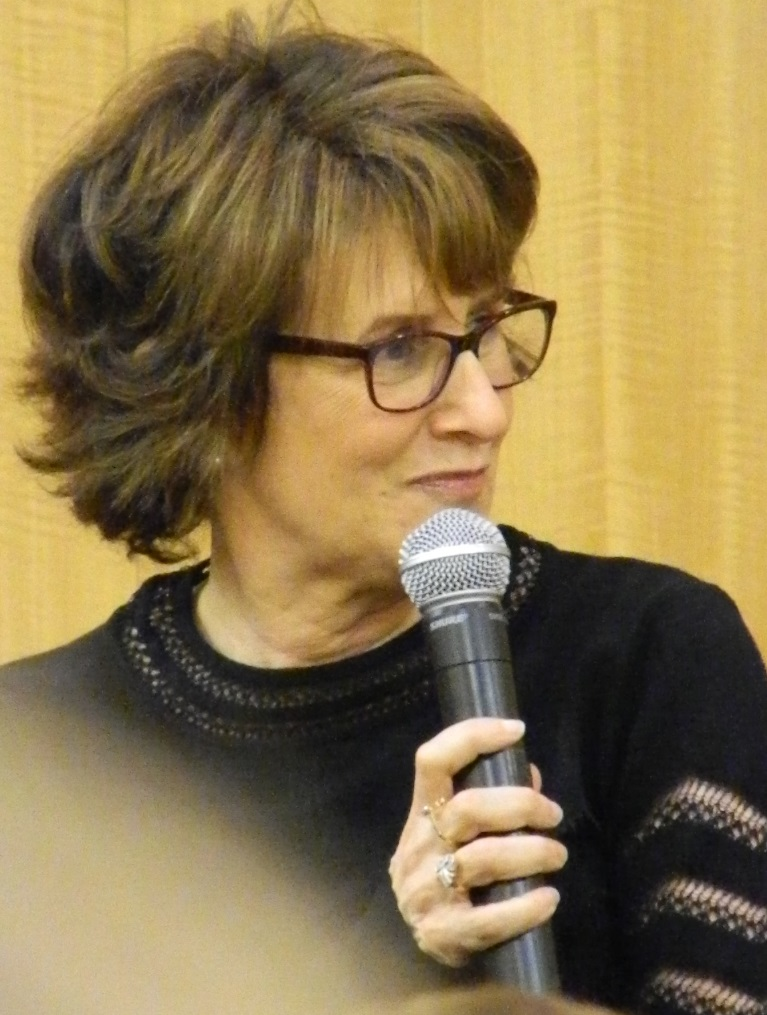
- Ephron in 2013
- Born: July 12, 1944 (age 82); New York City, U.S.
- Occupations: Novelist, screenwriter, producer
- Years active: 1972–present
- Spouses: Jerome Kass (m. 1982; died 2015) Peter Rutter (m. 2017)
- Parent(s): Henry Ephron; Phoebe Ephron
- Relatives: Nora Ephron (sister); Amy Ephron (sister); Hallie Ephron (sister); June Gale (stepmother)

Delia Ephron (/ˈɛfrən/ EF-rən; born July 12, 1944) is an American writer and film producer.

== Early life ==
Ephron was born in New York City, the second eldest of four daughters of screenwriters Phoebe and Henry Ephron. She grew up in Beverly Hills.

== Career ==
Ephron's movies include You've Got Mail, The Sisterhood of the Traveling Pants, Hanging Up (based on her novel), and Michael. She has written novels for adults (Hanging Up, The Lion Is In and the recent Siracusa) and teenagers (Frannie in Pieces and The Girl with the Mermaid Hair), books of humor (How to Eat Like a Child), and essays. Her family is Jewish.

Her journalism has appeared in The New York Times, Oprah Magazine, Vogue, More, The Wall Street Journal, and The Huffington Post. In 2011, she won an Athena Film Festival award for creativity and panache as a screenwriter.

Ephron collaborated with her elder sister, Nora, on Love, Loss, and What I Wore, which ran for over two and a half years Off-Broadway. It has played in cities across the U.S., as well as in cities around the world, including Paris, Rio de Janeiro, Cape Town, Manila, and Sydney.

In Fall 2024, Ephron made her Broadway debut as a solo playwright, with a stage adaptation of her autobiography, Left on Tenth, directed by Susan Stroman and starring Julianna Margulies and Peter Gallagher at the James Earl Jones Theatre In 2014 she had written a New York Times op-ed reacting to a shocking plot twist on Julianna Margulies' TV drama The Good Wife.

== Filmography ==
=== Screenplays ===
- How to Eat Like a Child (TV special, 1981)
- Brenda Starr (1989) – as by "Jenny Wolkind"
- This Is My Life (1992)
- Mixed Nuts (1994)
- Michael (1996)
- You've Got Mail (1998)
- Hanging Up (2000)
- The Sisterhood of the Traveling Pants (2005)
- Bewitched (2005)

=== Producer ===
- Sleepless in Seattle (1993)
- You've Got Mail (1998)
- Hanging Up (2000)

== Books ==
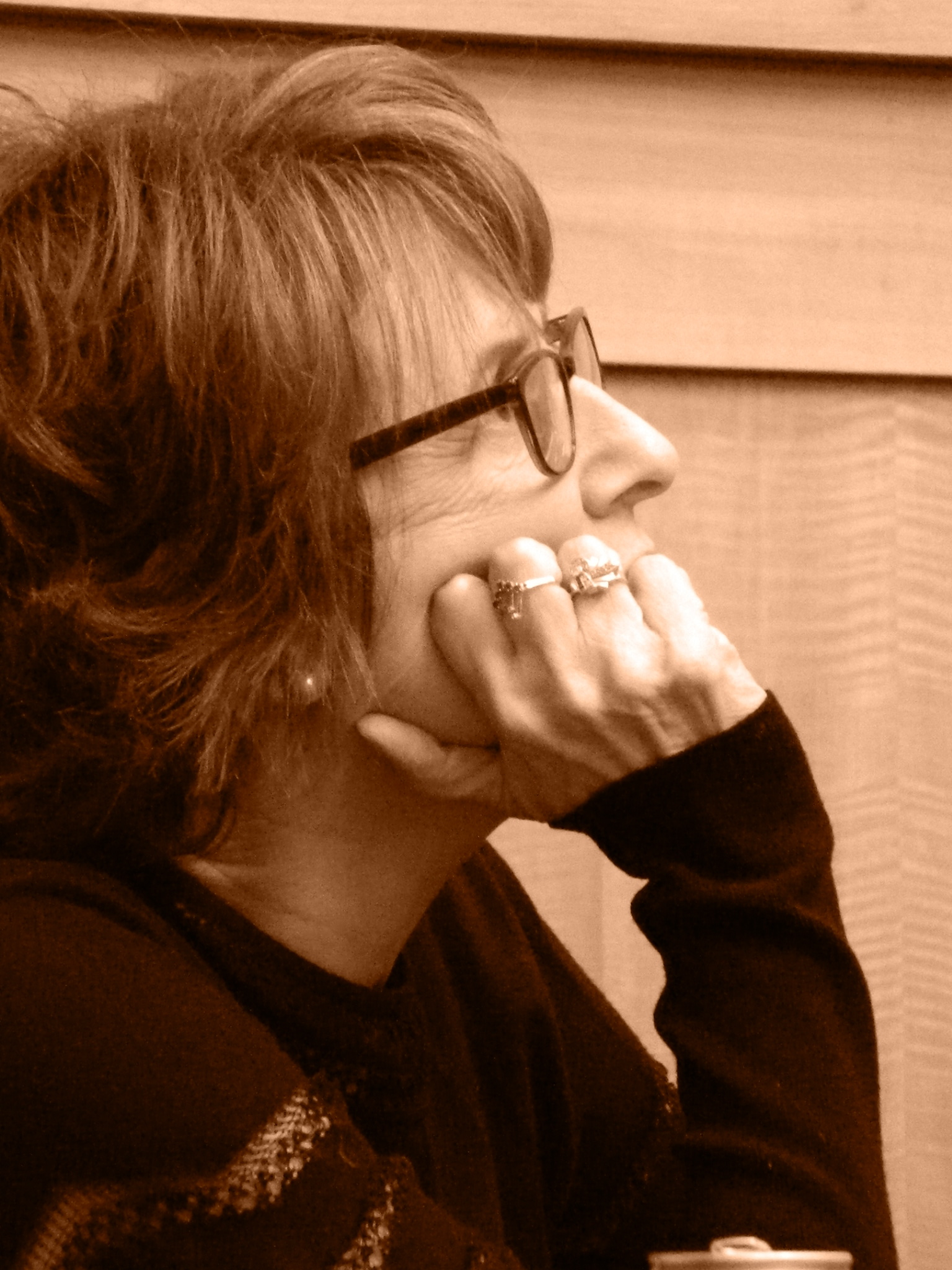
Ephron in New York, September 17, 2013, Barnes & Noble.

- (with Lorraine Bodger, under name Delia Brock) The Adventurous Crocheter (1972)
- (With Lorraine Bodger, under name Delia Brock) Gladrags: Redesigning, Remaking, Refitting All Your Old Clothes (1975)
- How to Eat Like a Child (1978), illustrated by cartoonist Edward Koren
- (With Lorraine Bodger) Crafts for All Seasons (1980)
- Teenage Romance: Or, How to Die of Embarrassment (1981), illustrated by cartoonist Edward Koren
- Santa and Alex (1983)
- Funny Sauce: Us, the Ex, the Ex's New Mate, the New Mate's Ex, and the Kids, Viking (1986)
- Do I Have to Say Hello?: Aunt Delia's Manners Quiz for Kids/Grownups (1989), illustrated by cartoonist Edward Koren
- My Life and Nobody Else's (1991)
- The Girl Who Changed the World (1993)
- Hanging Up (1995)
- Big City Eyes (2000)
- Frannie in Pieces (2007)
- The Girl with the Mermaid Hair (2009)
- The Lion Is In (2012)
- Sister Mother Husband Dog: Etc (2013)
- Siracusa (2016)
- Left on Tenth: A Second Chance at Life (2022)
