= This Is My Life (1992 film) =

1992 film by Nora Ephron

- Theatrical release poster
- Directed by: Nora Ephron
- Screenplay by: Nora Ephron; Delia Ephron
- Based on: This Is Your Life by Meg Wolitzer
- Produced by: Lynda Obst
- Starring: Julie Kavner; Samantha Mathis; Gaby Hoffmann; Carrie Fisher; Dan Aykroyd
- Cinematography: Bobby Byrne
- Edited by: Robert M. Reitano
- Music by: Carly Simon
- Production company: 20th Century Fox
- Distributed by: 20th Century Fox
- Release date: February 21, 1992
- Running time: 105 minutes
- Country: United States
- Language: English
- Budget: $10 million
- Box office: $2,922,094

This Is My Life is a 1992 American comedy drama film. It stars Julie Kavner as a working class single mother trying to break into stand-up comedy who struggles to juggle her newfound fame with her existing responsibilities as a parent.

The film—adapted from the 1988 novel This Is Your Life by Meg Wolitzer—marked the directorial debut of screenwriter Nora Ephron, who also co-wrote the screenplay with her sister Delia Ephron.

This Is My Life was released by 20th Century Fox on February 21, 1992. The film received mixed to negative reviews from critics and was a box office bomb grossing $2,922,094 against a $10 million budget.

== Plot ==
Dottie Ingels is a single mother in Queens who works on a Macy's cosmetics counter but aspires to be a stand-up comedian. She and her two daughters—bookish teenager Erica and pre-teen Opal—have lived with Dottie's aunt Harriet ever since Dottie's ex-husband, Norm, walked out on them several years earlier. Dottie dreams of stardom but keeps bumping up against the reality of living paycheck to paycheck, and the only way she can practice her material is while selling cosmetics.

When Harriet dies suddenly, Dottie inherits the house. She decides to sell it and use the money to rent an apartment in Manhattan, betting that she can finally break into comedy before going broke. Dressing in polka-dots to make herself more memorable, her first gigs go well. She also makes friends with other struggling comics on the local club circuit, who are shocked and impressed when she lands a meeting with eccentric mega-agent Arnold Moss via his assistant Claudia Curtis.

Moss enjoys Dottie's set, and immediately lands her a slot at the Comedy Shop on Sunset Strip, Los Angeles—one of the West Coast's biggest comedy showcases. Erica and Opal, who saw Moss eating a napkin during the show, are skeptical of the agent but supportive of their mother. Dottie leaves the kids to be babysat by her NYC comedy friends, and her sets are such a success that she extends her trip by two weeks for more, including a guest slot on a nationally syndicated late night talk show, The Gary Garry Show. While initially excited about Dottie's rapid rise, the girls are quickly frustrated when she gets home and chooses to return to LA immediately for more shows. After Dottie books an embarrassing—but well-paid—part as a talking chicken in a commercial, Erica tells Opal that Dottie is "disgusting" for not being a "regular mom" who prioritizes parenting over work, and that she wishes she wasn't an Ingels.

Erica starts dating Jordan, a boy from her school, but when his mother, an endocrinologist, walks in on them having sex for the first time she uses it as an opportunity to deliver a lecture on safe sex using a life-size model of the female reproductive system. Erica, mortified, becomes depressed after the incident, but Dottie is too busy to notice. However, when Dottie then appears on a chat show to promote her upcoming residency at the Tropicana casino in Las Vegas she mentions that Erica dislikes her stand-up career and wants to change her name out of embarrassment, leaving Erica angry at Opal for betraying her trust, and enraged that Dottie is only paying attention to her daughters' lives for the sake of material for her act.

Even worse, after the opening show of the residency the girls overhear Dottie coming back to their shared hotel suite with a man. She admits the next morning that she and Moss have been secretly dating for some time, and the girls—who by this point have started derisively referring to him as "The Moss"—are disturbed at the thought of him becoming their step-father. They hire a private detective to find Norm living upstate in Albany and debate whether to visit him, despite Erica barely remembering him and Opal having no memories of him at all.

One night Dottie and Moss return home from a date and walk in on Erica delivering her own furious "stand-up" monologue to Opal and the babysitters about how they only get to see their mother on TV. Dottie calls the girls ungrateful for not appreciating her sacrifices. Having had enough, the girls pack suitcases and sneak out overnight. They arrive in Albany and meet Norm's new wife, Martha, while they wait for their father to get home from his job at a fruit distributor. When he arrives he shows no interest in the girls, and laughs derisively when they tell him that Dottie is now a successful comedian. They instinctively defend her achievements.

Opal realizes that she does have one memory of Norm—on the day that he left, he told the girls that they would "probably turn out fidgety like Dottie." Erica, suddenly remembering the moment herself, immediately ends the reunion and insists that Norm drive them back to the station. On the train home Erica explains to Opal that Norm had actually said "frigid," meaning "cold in bed." Opal asks if he was telling the truth, and Erica tearfully replies, "With him, probably, who wouldn't be?"

Thoroughly disillusioned, they reconcile with Dottie, who apologizes for putting her career ahead of them. As they hug each other on their couch, Opal and Erica suggest Dottie find work closer to home by writing a sitcom set in NYC about a single mother who works at a cosmetics counter in a department store.

== Cast ==
- Julie Kavner as Dottie Ingels
- Samantha Mathis as Erica Ingels
- Gaby Hoffmann as Opal Ingels
- Carrie Fisher as Claudia Curtis
- Dan Aykroyd as Arnold Moss
- Marita Geraghty as Mia Jablon
- Welker White as Lynn
- Caroline Aaron as Martha Ingels
- Kathy Ann Najimy as Angela
- Danny Zorn as Jordan Strang
- Estelle Harris as Aunt Harriet
- Louis Di Bianco as Norm Ingels
- Joy Behar as Rudy

== Production ==
The film was at Columbia Pictures but was put into turnaround in 1990. Ephron allegedly asked Jon Peters if he had read the script, to which he answered, "I've made over 60 movies. I don't have to read a script to know whether it works or not."

The character portrayed by Aykroyd, Arnold Moss, is based on the famous New York talent agent Sam Cohn, and has some of the eccentricities for which Cohn was known, such as a habit of eating paper.

=== Soundtrack ===
The film's soundtrack was performed by Carly Simon and released on Qwest Records. Although the album failed to chart, the single "Love of My Life" reached No. 16 on the Billboard Adult Contemporary chart.

== Reception ==
This Is My Life was met with lukewarm critical responses. On the review aggregator website Rotten Tomatoes, it has an approval of 36% rating based on reviews from 14 critics, with an average rating of 5.5/10.

=== Critical response ===
Roger Ebert of the Chicago Sun-Times gave it 3 out of 4.

Janet Maslin of The New York Times wrote: "Making her directorial debut with This Is My Life, Nora Ephron does exactly what she did on the page. She shapes every detail of this witty, picture-perfect slice of New York life to fit a single vision, one that even at its most generous and funny manages to retain a penetrating clarity."

Owen Gleiberman of Entertainment Weekly gave it a C+.

In 2020, David Sims of The Atlantic, called it "the forgotten gem in Ephron’s filmmaking career".

== Home media ==
20th Century Fox released the film on DVD-R in 2012 as part of its Fox Cinema Archives line.
