= William Marchant (playwright) =

American dramatist

- Born: May 1, 1923; Allentown, Pennsylvania, U.S.
- Died: November 5, 1995 (aged 72); Paramus, New Jersey, U.S.
- Education: Temple University (BA); Yale University (MFA)
- Occupations: Playwright and screenwriter

William Marchant (May 1, 1923 – November 5, 1995) was a playwright and screenwriter. He wrote the play The Desk Set, which served as the basis for the 1957 Walter Lang movie Desk Set.

Marchant was a resident of the Actor's Fund home in Englewood, New Jersey at the time of his death. He had earlier lived in the Stanton section of Readington Township, New Jersey, in a home owned by Broadway actress Dorothy Stickney.

== Early life and education ==
Marchant was born in Allentown, Pennsylvania, on May 1, 1923. He attended Temple University in Philadelphia and Yale School of Drama in New Haven, Connecticut.

== Career ==
=== Playwriting ===
Marchant's play To Be Continued, which included a 23-year-old Grace Kelly in the cast, opened on April 23, 1952, at the Booth Theatre on Broadway and ran for 13 performances.

The Desk Set opened on Broadway on October 24, 1955, at the Broadhurst Theatre and ran for 297 performances with Shirley Booth in the lead role. The play was the source material for an eponymous 1957 movie starring Spencer Tracy and Katharine Hepburn.

In 1975, Marchant wrote The Privilege of his Company, a remembrance of Noël Coward, which was published by Bobbs-Merrill Company.

He translated the French play Les Dames Du Jeudi by Loleh Bellon for Lynn Redgrave and John Clark, who premiered it as Thursday's Girls at the Coronet Theater in Los Angeles in 1981.

=== Screenwriting ===
As a screenwriter, Marchant wrote several episodes for the Armchair Theatre and Armchair Mystery Theatre, dramatized Louise, a W. Somerset Maugham story, for a 1969 BBC Two television production, and worked on two films, Triple Cross (1966) and My Lover, My Son.
