= Daddy Long Legs (1955 film) =

1955 film by Jean Negulesco

- Directed by: Jean Negulesco
- Screenplay by: Henry Ephron; Phoebe Ephron
- Based on: Daddy-Long-Legs; 1912 novel 1914 play by Jean Webster
- Produced by: Samuel G. Engel
- Starring: Fred Astaire; Leslie Caron; Terry Moore; Thelma Ritter; Fred Clark
- Cinematography: Leon Shamroy
- Edited by: William H. Reynolds
- Music by: Alex North (ballet music); Alfred Newman Cyril J. Mockridge (score); Ken Darby (vocal supervision); Edward B. Powell; Billy May; Earle Hagen; Skip Martin; Bernard Mayers (orchestrations)
- Production company: 20th Century Fox
- Distributed by: 20th Century Fox
- Release date: May 4, 1955
- Running time: 126 minutes
- Country: United States
- Language: English
- Budget: $2.6 million
- Box office: $2.5 million (US rentals)

Daddy Long Legs (1955) is a musical comedy film set in France, New York City, and the fictional college town of Walston, Massachusetts. The film was directed by Jean Negulesco, and stars Fred Astaire, Leslie Caron, Terry Moore, Fred Clark, and Thelma Ritter, with music and lyrics by Johnny Mercer. The screenplay was written by Phoebe Ephron and Henry Ephron, loosely based on the 1912 novel Daddy-Long-Legs by Jean Webster.

This was the first of three consecutive Astaire films set in France or with a French theme (the others being Funny Face and Silk Stockings), following the fashion for French-themed musicals established by ardent Francophile Gene Kelly with An American in Paris (1951), which also featured Kelly's protégée Caron. Like The Band Wagon, Daddy Long Legs did only moderately well at the box office.

== Plot ==
Wealthy American Jervis Pendleton III has a chance encounter at a French orphanage with cheerful 18-year-old resident Julie André. He anonymously pays for her education at a New England college. She writes letters to her mysterious benefactor, whom she calls Daddy Long Legs (based on her fellow orphans' description of his shadow), but he never writes back. Several years later, he visits her at school, still concealing his identity. Despite their wide age difference, they fall in love.

== Cast ==
- Fred Astaire as Jervis Pendleton III
- Leslie Caron as Julie André
- Terry Moore as Linda Pendleton
- Thelma Ritter as Alicia Pritchard
- Fred Clark as Griggs
- Charlotte Austin as Sally McBride
- Larry Keating as Ambassador Alexander Williamson
- Kathryn Givney as Gertrude Pendleton
- Kelly Brown as Jimmy McBride
- Ray Anthony as himself (as Ray Anthony and His Orchestra)
- James Cromwell as Extra
- Olan Soule as Assistant Manager (uncredited)
- Georges Reich as Specialty Dancer (uncredited)
- Percival Vivian as Professor (uncredited)

== Production ==
20th Century Fox bought the rights to Jean Webster's original Daddy Long Legs in 1931, releasing two versions of the film, one starring Janet Gaynor and one with Shirley Temple.

Producer Darryl F. Zanuck envisioned a remake, this time seeking to star singer-actress Mitzi Gaynor. The project would not be realized until Zanuck met Fred Astaire and was inspired to make Daddy Long Legs a musical film. While Zanuck still envisioned Gaynor for the main female role, Astaire insisted on casting actress and dancer Leslie Caron. Caron was then loaned to Fox by MGM, with whom Caron was under contract.

Caron recalled how, after director Jean Negulesco scheduled a full day for a difficult scene, Astaire "did it in one take. One take only". To fill the time the actor suggested doing a dance scene Caron had not rehearsed, promising that he could lead her: "And we went through it once, and we shot, and that was it. That was Fred. He was that good".

Production was halted in July 1954, as Astaire's wife Phyllis became ill from lung cancer. She died in September, putting Astaire in a state of grief and stalling his work on the film. Although replacements were sought for Astaire's role, as too much money had already been spent on the production, he resumed and completed the film.

== Key songs/dance routines ==
Astaire had previously attempted to integrate ballet into his dance routines in Shall We Dance (1937). As his first film in Cinemascope widescreen–which he was to parody later in the "Stereophonic Sound" number from Silk Stockings (1957)–Daddy Long Legs provided Astaire the opportunity to explore the additional space available, with the help of his assistant choreographer Dave Robel. Roland Petit designed the much-maligned "Nightmare Ballet" number. As usual, Astaire adapted his choreography to the particular strengths of his partner, in this case ballet. Even so, Caron ran into some problems making the film, her last dance musical, which she attributed to her early musical training. Astaire mentioned in his biography that "one day at rehearsals I asked her to listen extra carefully to the music, so as to keep in time."

- "History of the Beat": This is an Astaire song-and-dance solo using drumsticks performed in an office environment, recalling the "Nice Work If You Can Get It" routine from A Damsel in Distress (1937) and the "Drum Crazy" number from Easter Parade (1948). As this was the first number to be filmed, some commentators have speculated that it was affected by Astaire's grief at his wife's death.
- "Daddy Long Legs": An off-screen female chorus sings this attractive number while Caron muses fondly at a blackboard cartoon sketch of Astaire.
- "Daydream Sequence": Astaire appears in three guises: a Texan, an international playboy and a guardian angel based on images of him described in letters from Caron. As a Texan, he performs a comic square-dance routine to a short song dubbed by Thurl Ravenscroft, the only time in his career that Astaire's voice was dubbed. As an international playboy, he tangoes his way through a flock of women, including Barrie Chase, later to be his dance partner in all of his television specials from 1958 to 1968. The third routine is a gentle romantic dance with Caron, who performs graceful ballet steps while Astaire glides admiringly around her.
- "Sluefoot": This is a boisterous and joyous dance with Astaire and Caron involving sharp leg movements. Astaire inserts a short and zany solo segment, and the chorus join in toward the end. The band leader in this scene is Ray Anthony.
- "Something's Gotta Give": Astaire was grateful to his friend Mercer for composing this now-famous standard, as he felt that the film lacked a strong popular song. Some commentators have detected a certain stiffness in Caron, especially in her upper body.
- "Nightmare Ballet": This is a solo routine for Caron frequently criticized for its content and length (12 minutes).
- "Dream": This is a short romantic routine for Astaire and Caron with dreamlike twirling motifs and, unusual for Astaire, a kiss.

== Reception ==
The Japanese filmmaker Akira Kurosawa cited Daddy Long Legs as one of his 100 favorite films.

Film critic of the day, Pauline Kael, called the film bloated and the meaning too obvious.

== Awards and nominations ==
Award	Category	Nominee(s)	Result	Ref.
Academy Awards	Best Art Direction – Color	Art Direction: Lyle R. Wheeler and John DeCuir; Set Decoration: Walter M. Scott and Paul S. Fox	Nominated	
Academy Awards	Best Scoring of a Musical Picture	Alfred Newman	Nominated	
Academy Awards	Best Song	"Something's Gotta Give"; Music and Lyrics by Johnny Mercer	Nominated	
Writers Guild of America Awards	Best Written American Musical	Phoebe Ephron and Henry Ephron	Nominated	
