= Phoebe Ephron =

American dramatist

- Born: Phoebe Wolkind; January 26, 1914; New York City, New York, U.S.
- Died: October 13, 1971 (aged 57); New York City
- Occupations: Playwright, screenwriter
- Years active: 1944–1963
- Spouse: Henry Ephron (m. 1934)
- Children: Nora; Delia; Hallie; Amy

Phoebe Ephron (née Wolkind; January 26, 1914 – October 13, 1971) was an American playwright and screenwriter. She often worked with Henry Ephron, her husband, whom she wed in 1934.

Ephron was born in New York City to Louis and Kate (née Lautkin) Wolkind, a dress manufacturer. Her family is Jewish.

Ephron was active as a writer from the early 1940s through the early 1960s. Her four daughters – Nora Ephron, Delia Ephron, Hallie Ephron and Amy Ephron – all became writers like their parents. Ephron was nominated for an Oscar for Best Writing, Screenplay Based on Material from Another Medium, along with writing partners Richard L. Breen and husband Henry Ephron, for their work on Captain Newman, M.D. (1963). She died in 1971, aged 57, in New York City.

== Notable works (films unless otherwise noted) ==
- Three Is a Family (1944) with Charlie Ruggles
- Bride by Mistake (1944) with Laraine Day and Edgar Buchanan
- The Jackpot (1950) with James Stewart
- Belles on Their Toes (1952); sequel to Cheaper by the Dozen with Myrna Loy and Debra Paget
- What Price Glory (1952); screenplay
- There's No Business Like Show Business (1954) with Marilyn Monroe
- Daddy Long Legs (1955); Screenplay
- Carousel (1956)
- Desk Set (1957) with Spencer Tracy and Katharine Hepburn
- Take Her, She's Mine (1961); Broadway play, later made into a film
- Captain Newman, M.D. (1963) with Gregory Peck and Tony Curtis
