= Henry Ephron =

American dramatist (1911–1992)

- Born: May 26, 1911; New York City, New York, U.S.
- Died: September 6, 1992 (aged 81); Los Angeles, California, U.S.
- Occupations: Screenwriter, producer, director
- Years active: 1944–1963
- Spouses: Phoebe Wolkind (m. 1934; died 1971) June Gale (m. 1978; div. 1985)
- Children: Nora; Delia; Hallie; Amy

Henry Ephron (May 26, 1911 – September 6, 1992) was an American playwright, screenwriter and film producer. He often worked with his wife, Phoebe (née Wolkind) and was active as a writer from the early 1940s through the early 1960s.

== Early life ==
Henry Ephron was born in Bronx, New York, the son of Gittle "Gussie" (née Weinstein) and Yitzhak Asher "Isaac" Ephron, a retailer. His parents were Jewish immigrants, his father from Grodno, now in Belarus, and his mother from Skidzyelʹ, now in Belarus. All four of his daughters by his first wife, Phoebe: Nora Ephron, Delia Ephron, Hallie Ephron and Amy Ephron, became notable writers. Coincidentally, his second wife, June (née Gilmartin; July 6, 1911 – November 13, 1996), widow of Oscar Levant, who wed Ephron in 1978, was also one of four sisters. His family is Jewish.

Ephron died in 1992 of "natural causes" at the Motion Picture Hospital in Los Angeles.

== Notable works ==
(unless otherwise noted, films written with Phoebe Ephron):

- Three Is a Family (1944)
- Bride by Mistake (1944)
- Belles on Their Toes (1952); sequel to Cheaper by the Dozen
- What Price Glory (1952); Screenplay
- There's No Business Like Show Business (1954)
- Daddy Long Legs (1955); Screenplay
- Carousel (1956); also producer
- Desk Set (1957); also producer
- Take Her, She's Mine (1961); Broadway play, later made into a film, then an unsold ABC TV comedy series with Van Johnson starring in the pilot
- Captain Newman, M.D. (1963), nominated for Oscar, Best Screenplay Based on Material from Another Medium

== Autobiography ==
- We Thought We Could Do Anything (1977)
