= Nora Ephron =

American writer and filmmaker (1941–2012)

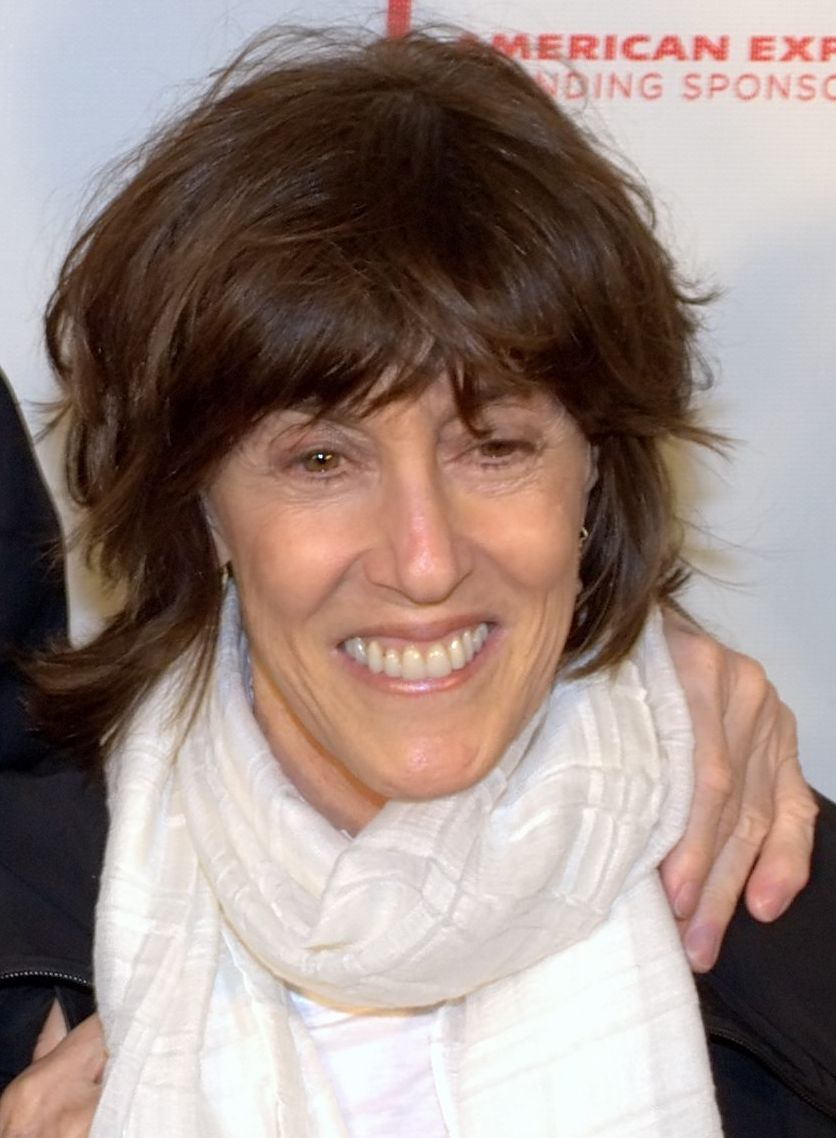
- Ephron at the 2010 Tribeca Film Festival
- Born: May 19, 1941; New York City, U.S.
- Died: June 26, 2012 (aged 71); New York City, U.S.
- Education: Wellesley College (BA)
- Occupations: Writer; playwright; journalist; film director
- Years active: 1962–2012
- Notable work: Silkwood; When Harry Met Sally...; Sleepless in Seattle; You've Got Mail; Julie & Julia
- Spouses: Dan Greenburg (m. 1967; div. 1976); Carl Bernstein (m. 1976; div. 1980); Nicholas Pileggi (m. 1987)
- Children: 2
- Parents: Henry Ephron; Phoebe Wolkind
- Relatives: Amy Ephron (sister); Delia Ephron (sister); Hallie Ephron (sister); June Gale (stepmother)
- Awards: BAFTA Award (1990); Crystal Award (1994); Ian McLellan Hunter Award (2003); Golden Apple Award (2009)

Nora Ephron (/ˈɛfrən/ EF-rən; May 19, 1941 – June 26, 2012) was an American writer, playwright, journalist, and filmmaker. Known for writing and directing romantic comedy films, she received numerous accolades including a BAFTA Award as well as nominations for three Academy Awards, a Tony Award, a Golden Globe Award, and three Writers Guild of America Awards.

Ephron started her career writing the screenplays for Silkwood (1983), Heartburn (1986), and When Harry Met Sally... (1989), the last of which earned the BAFTA Award for Best Original Screenplay, and was ranked by the Writers Guild of America as the 40th greatest screenplay of all time. She made her directorial film debut with the comedy drama This Is My Life (1992), and was followed by the romantic comedies Sleepless in Seattle (1993), Michael (1996), You've Got Mail (1998), Bewitched (2005), and the biographical film Julie & Julia (2009).

Ephron's first produced play, Imaginary Friends (2002), was honored as one of the ten best plays of the 2002–03 New York theatre season. She also co-authored the Drama Desk Award–winning theatrical production Love, Loss, and What I Wore. In 2013, she received a posthumous Tony Award nomination for Best Play for Lucky Guy, her last play. She also wrote columns for Esquire, Cosmopolitan, and The New Yorker.

== Early life and education ==
Ephron was born in New York City on May 19, 1941, to a Jewish family. She was the eldest of four daughters, and grew up in Beverly Hills, California. Her parents, Phoebe (née Wolkind) and Henry Ephron, were both East Coast-born playwrights and screenwriters. Her parents named her Nora after the protagonist in the play A Doll's House by Henrik Ibsen. Nora's younger sisters, Delia and Amy, are also writers. Her sister Hallie Ephron is a journalist, book reviewer, and novelist who writes crime fiction. Ephron's parents based the ingenue character in the play and film version of Take Her, She's Mine on the 22-year-old Nora and her letters from college; Sandra Dee played the character based on Nora in the film version, with James Stewart portraying her father. Both her parents became alcoholics during their declining years.

As a high school student, Ephron dreamed of going to New York City to become another Dorothy Parker, an American poet, writer, satirist, and critic. Ephron has cited her high school journalism teacher, Charles Simms, as the inspiration for her pursuit of a career in journalism. She graduated from Beverly Hills High School in 1958, and from Wellesley College in Massachusetts in 1962 with a degree in political science. In 1961, she was engaged to Matthew J. Zinn, but they never married.

== Career ==
=== 1966–1979: Work as a journalist ===
After graduating from Wellesley, Ephron worked briefly as an intern in the White House of President John F. Kennedy. She also applied to be a writer at Newsweek. After she was told they did not hire women writers, she accepted a position as a mail girl.

After eventually quitting Newsweek because she was not allowed to write, Ephron participated in a class action lawsuit against the magazine for sexual discrimination, described in the book The Good Girls Revolt: How the Women of Newsweek Sued Their Bosses and Changed the Workplace by Lynn Povich, and both the lawsuit and Ephron's role were fictionalized in a 2016 Amazon series by the similar main title Good Girls Revolt.

After a satire in Monocle she wrote lampooning the New York Post caught the editor's eye, Ephron accepted a job at the Post, where she worked as a reporter for five years. In 1966, she broke the news in the Post that Bob Dylan had married Sara Lownds in a private ceremony. After becoming a successful writer, she wrote a column on women's issues for Esquire. In this position, Ephron made a name for herself by writing "A Few Words About Breasts", a humorous essay about body image that "established her as the enfant terrible of the New Journalism". While at Esquire, she took on subjects as wide-ranging as Dorothy Schiff, her former boss and owner of the Post; Betty Friedan, whom she chastised for pursuing a feud with Gloria Steinem; and her alma mater Wellesley, which she said had turned out "a generation of docile and unadventurous women". A 1968 send-up of Women's Wear Daily that she wrote for Cosmopolitan resulted in threats of a lawsuit from WWD.

Ephron rewrote a script for All the President's Men in the mid-1970s, along with her then husband, investigative journalist Carl Bernstein. While the script was not used, it was seen by someone who offered Ephron her first screenwriting job, for a television movie, which began her screenwriting career.

=== 1980–1998: Romantic comedy stardom ===
In 1983, Ephron co-scripted the film Silkwood with Alice Arlen. The film, directed by Mike Nichols, starred Meryl Streep as Karen Silkwood, a whistleblower at the Kerr McGee Cimarron nuclear facility who dies under suspicious circumstances. Ephron and Arlen were nominated for the Best Original Screenplay Oscar in 1984 for Silkwood.

Ephron's novel Heartburn was published in 1983. The novel is a semi-autobiographical account of her marriage with Carl Bernstein. The film adaptation was released in 1986, directed by Mike Nichols starring Meryl Streep and Jack Nicholson. Ephron adapted her own novel into the screenplay for the film. In the film, Ephron's fictionalized portrayal of herself, played by Streep, is a pregnant food writer who learns about her husband's affair.

In 1986, Ephron wrote the script for the romantic comedy When Harry Met Sally.... Released in 1989, the film was directed by Rob Reiner, and starred Billy Crystal and Meg Ryan. The film depicted the decade-long friendship between Harry (Crystal) and Sally (Ryan) as they navigate their own romantic relationships. Ephron claimed that she wrote this screenplay with Reiner in mind as the character of Harry, and herself as the character of Sally. The film has become iconic in the romantic comedy genre, most notably for the scene in which Sally pretends to have an orgasm in the middle of Katz's Deli during lunch. Ephron said she wrote the part of Sally simulating an orgasm into the script per Ryan's suggestions. Additionally, the comment "I'll have what she's having" said by a deli patron (played by Rob Reiner's real-life mother Estelle Reiner) watching the scene unfold nearby, was an idea from Billy Crystal. Ephron's script was nominated for the 1990 Oscar in Best Writing, Screenplay Written Directly for the Screen.

Ephron's directorial debut was the film This Is My Life (1992). Ephron and her sister Delia Ephron wrote the script based on Meg Wolitzer's novel This is Your Life. The film is about a woman who decides to pursue a career in stand-up comedy after inheriting a substantial sum of money from a relative. In a conversation released by Criterion Channel between Lena Dunham, and Ephron, she stated "That movie I made completely for Woody Allen." She later stated in the conversation that he saw it and liked it.

In 1993, Ephron directed and wrote the script for the romantic comedy Sleepless in Seattle. The film stars Tom Hanks as Sam Baldwin, a recently widowed father whose son calls into a Chicago-based radio talk show in an attempt to find his father a new partner. After hearing this call, Baltimore resident Annie Reed, played by Meg Ryan, becomes infatuated with Sam, and sets up a rendezvous for the two to meet in New York City. The film received positive reviews with Michael Wilmington of Los Angeles Times describing it as a "real charmer ... a romantic comedy about an ultimate long-distance relationship. Emphasize 'romantic.' Emphasize 'comedy.' It delivers both", adding that it "almost makes us forget our modern-day cynicism". The film was a box office success becoming one of the highest-grossing films of 1993. Ephron was nominated for an Academy Award for Best Original Screenplay losing to Jane Campion for The Piano (1993).

In 1994, Nora Ephron was awarded the Women in Film Crystal Award. That year, she directed the dark Christmas comedy Mixed Nuts (1994) which starred Steve Martin, Madeline Kahn, Rita Wilson, Rob Reiner and Adam Sandler. The film was based on the French comedy Le Père Noël est une ordure (1979). She co-wrote the screenplay with her sister Delia Ephron. The film received mixed reviews and was a box office flop. She then directed the comedy fantasy film Michael (1996) starring John Travolta, Andie MacDowell and William Hurt. The film received mixed reviews but was a box office success. David Ansen of Newsweek praised the film as being "charming...quirky...[and] a Christmas stocking stuffer".

In 1998, Nora Ephron directed the film You've Got Mail, which she co-wrote with her sister Delia Ephron. The story is a loose adaptation of the Ernst Lubitsch film from 1940 The Shop Around the Corner. You've Got Mail stars Meg Ryan as Kathleen Kelly, an owner of a small, independent children's bookstore in New York City. Her quiet life is then threatened by Fox Books, a Barnes & Noble-esque book selling chain, which opens near her shop. Fox Books is run by Joe Fox, played by Tom Hanks. Joe and Kathleen navigate a tumultuous business rivalry, while unknowingly forming an intimate connection with each other via email.

=== 2000–2013: Theater work and final projects ===
Ephron's play Imaginary Friends (2002) explores the rivalry between writers Lillian Hellman and Mary McCarthy. She co-authored the play Love, Loss, and What I Wore (based on the book by Ilene Beckerman) with her sister Delia, and it has played to sold-out audiences in Canada, New York City and Los Angeles. In 2007, Ephron received the Golden Plate Award of the American Academy of Achievement presented by Awards Council member George Lucas.

Ephron directed and co-wrote the screenplay for her final film Julie & Julia (2009). The film is based on Julie Powell's blog and memoir of the same title. The film is about Julia Child, the famous American chef played by Meryl Streep, and Julie Powell, a New Yorker attempting to cook her way through Child's cookbook, played by Amy Adams. As Powell blogs her experience, the film flashes back to the story of Child's first stages of her career as she trains in a French culinary school. The film received positive reviews and was a commercial success. Streep received the Golden Globe Award for Best Actress – Motion Picture Comedy or Musical for her performance with nominations for the Academy Award, BAFTA Award, and Screen Actors Guild Award. Ephron received a nomination for the Writers Guild of America Award for Best Adapted Screenplay.

Her play, Lucky Guy was released posthumously. It was released a year after her death in 2013 on Broadway and starred Tom Hanks as a newspaper journalist Mike McAlary. Ephron and Hanks received Tony Award nominations for Best Play and Best Actor in a Play respectively. Alexis Soloski of The Guardian praised the production and Ephron's writing declaring, "She has a lively sense of the caffeine-addled cut and thrust of newsroom life, and can make you very nearly weepy for the past triumphs of the tabs, even as she shows what a closed, testosterone-heavy world they occupied".

== Personal life ==
Ephron was married three times. Her first marriage to writer Dan Greenburg ended in divorce after nine years, from 1967 to 1976. Also in 1976, she married journalist Carl Bernstein with whom she had two sons. In 1979, Ephron was pregnant with their second son when she discovered Bernstein's affair with their mutual friend, British journalist Margaret Jay, the daughter of former British prime minister James Callaghan, who was at the time married to the British ambassador to the United States, Peter Jay. Ephron was inspired by the affair to write the novel Heartburn (1983), which was then made into a 1986 Mike Nichols film starring Jack Nicholson and Meryl Streep. In the book, Ephron wrote of a fictional husband who was "capable of having sex with a Venetian blind". She also wrote that the character Thelma (based on Margaret Jay) looked like a giraffe with "big feet". Bernstein threatened to sue over the book and film but never did, instead having his friends and colleagues leave poor reviews to try to sabotage the film’s release.

Ephron was married for 25 years to screenwriter Nicholas Pileggi from 1987 until her death in 2012. The couple lived in the Hollywood Hills in Los Angeles and in New York City.

Ephron's friend Richard Cohen said of her, "She was very Jewish, culturally and emotionally. She identified fully as a Jewish woman." However, Ephron was not religious. "You can never have too much butter – that is my belief. If I have a religion, that's it", she quipped in an NPR interview about her 2009 movie Julie & Julia.

Ephron's son, Jacob Bernstein, directed an HBO movie on her life titled Everything Is Copy. As of 2021, he was a reporter for The New York Times. Another son, Max, is a keyboard and guitar player.

For many years, Ephron was one of the very few people who knew the identity of Deep Throat, the anonymous informer for articles written by her ex-husband Carl Bernstein and Bob Woodward uncovering the Watergate scandal. Ephron read in Woodward and Bernstein's book All the President's Men that in Bernstein's notes, he referred to Deep Throat as "MF"; Bernstein said it stood for "My Friend", but Ephron correctly guessed it stood for Mark Felt, the former associate director of the FBI.

After Ephron's marriage with Bernstein ended, Ephron revealed Deep Throat's identity to her son Jacob and anyone else who asked. She once said, "I would give speeches to 500 people and someone would say, 'Do you know who Deep Throat is?' And I would say, 'It's Mark Felt.'" Classmates of Jacob at the Dalton School and Vassar College recall him revealing to numerous people that Felt was Deep Throat. This revelation attracted little media attention despite Deep Throat's identity being publicly unknown. Ephron said, "No one, apart from my sons, believed me." Ephron was invited by Arianna Huffington to write about the experience in The Huffington Post, for which Ephron was a regular blogger and part-time editor.

== Death and legacy ==
In 2006, Ephron was diagnosed with myelodysplasia. She chose not to disclose her diagnosis to friends or colleagues, fearing that the knowledge that she was ill would have impeded her career. On June 26, 2012, Ephron died at Weill Cornell Medical Center in Manhattan from pneumonia, as a complication of leukemia, at the age of 71.

Ephron's memorial service, called A Gathering for Nora, was held at Alice Tully Hall at Lincoln Center in New York City. The invitation-only event was attended by actors Alan Alda, Lauren Bacall, Christine Baranski, Annette Bening, Candice Bergen, Matthew Broderick, Sally Field, Jon Hamm, Tom Hanks, Joel Grey, Nicole Kidman, Shirley MacLaine, Bette Midler, Meg Ryan, and Meryl Streep; comedians Joy Behar, Billy Crystal, Larry David, Steve Martin, Rosie O'Donnell, and Martin Short; directors Woody Allen, James L. Brooks, Stanley Donen, Ron Howard, Elaine May, Mike Nichols, Rob Reiner, Martin Scorsese, and Steven Spielberg; singer Paul Simon; Vanity Fair editor Graydon Carter; activist Larry Kramer; Saturday Night Live creator Lorne Michaels; columnist Frank Rich; fashion designer Diane von Furstenberg; talk show host Regis Philbin; playwright Tony Kushner; New York City Mayor Michael Bloomberg; Senator Al Franken; and journalists Carl Bernstein, Ben Bradlee, Tom Brokaw, Gayle King, Charlie Rose, Diane Sawyer, and Barbara Walters, among others.

At that year's Karlovy Vary Film Festival, the lifetime achievement award honorees Helen Mirren and Susan Sarandon paid tribute to Ephron during their acceptance speeches.

The 2014 memoir Not That Kind of Girl, written by Lena Dunham, and the 2017 film The Post, directed by Spielberg, are both dedicated to Ephron.

The Nora Ephron Prize is a $25,000 award by the Tribeca Film Festival for a female writer or filmmaker "with a distinctive voice". The first Nora Ephron Prize was awarded in 2013 to Meera Menon for her film Farah Goes Bang.

== Filmography ==
=== Feature films ===
As an actress, Ephron appeared in two films, both directed by her friend Woody Allen: she is credited as being a wedding guest in Crimes and Misdemeanors (1989), and as a Dinner Party Guest in Husbands and Wives (1992).

| Year | Title | Director | Writer | Producer | Notes |
|---|---|---|---|---|---|
| 1983 | Silkwood | No | Yes | No | Co-written with Alice Arlen |
| 1986 | Heartburn | No | Yes | No | Adapted from her novel of the same name |
| 1989 | When Harry Met Sally... | No | Yes | Yes | |
| 1989 | Cookie | No | Yes | Yes | Co-written with Alice Arlen |
| 1990 | My Blue Heaven | No | Yes | Yes | |
| 1991 | The Super | No | Yes | No | Uncredited |
| 1992 | This Is My Life | Yes | Yes | No | Directorial debut; Co-written with Delia Ephron |
| 1993 | Sleepless in Seattle | Yes | Yes | No | Co-written with David S. Ward and Jeff Arch |
| 1994 | Mixed Nuts | Yes | Yes | No | Co-written with Delia Ephron |
| 1996 | Michael | Yes | Yes | Yes | Co-written with Delia Ephron |
| 1998 | All I Wanna Do | No | No | Yes | |
| 1998 | You've Got Mail | Yes | Yes | Yes | Co-written with Delia Ephron |
| 2000 | Hanging Up | No | Yes | Yes | Co-written with Delia Ephron |
| 2000 | Lucky Numbers | Yes | No | Yes | |
| 2005 | Bewitched | Yes | Yes | Yes | Co-written with Delia Ephron |
| 2009 | Julie & Julia | Yes | Yes | Yes | |

=== Theatre ===
| Year | Title | Notes | Theatre |
|---|---|---|---|
| 2002 | Imaginary Friends | Writer | Ethel Barrymore Theatre, Broadway |
| 2008 | Love, Loss, and What I Wore | Co-writer | Westside Theatre, Off-Broadway |
| 2013 | Lucky Guy | Posthumous release; Writer | Broadhurst Theatre, Broadway |

== Accolades ==
| Year | Award | Category | Nominated work | Result | Ref. |
|---|---|---|---|---|---|
| 1983 | Academy Award | Best Original Screenplay | Silkwood | Nominated | |
| 1989 | Academy Award | Best Original Screenplay | When Harry Met Sally... | Nominated | |
| 1993 | Academy Award | Best Original Screenplay | Sleepless in Seattle | Nominated | |
| 1989 | British Academy Film Award | Best Original Screenplay | When Harry Met Sally... | Won | |
| 1993 | British Academy Film Award | Best Original Screenplay | Sleepless in Seattle | Nominated | |
| 1989 | Golden Globe Award | Best Screenplay | When Harry Met Sally... | Nominated | |
| 2013 | Tony Award | Best Play | Lucky Guy | Nominated | |
| 1983 | Writers Guild of America Award | Best Original Screenplay | Silkwood | Nominated | |
| 1989 | Writers Guild of America Award | Best Original Screenplay | When Harry Met Sally... | Nominated | |
| 1993 | Writers Guild of America Award | Best Original Screenplay | Sleepless in Seattle | Nominated | |
| 2003 | Writers Guild of America Award | Ian McLellan Hunter Award | | Won | |
| 2010 | Writers Guild of America Award | Best Adapted Screenplay | Julie & Julia | Nominated | |

Other awards

| Year | Award | Category | Nominated work | Result | Notes |
|---|---|---|---|---|---|
| 1979 | Edgar Allan Poe Awards | Best Television Feature or Miniseries | Perfect Gentlemen | Nominated | |
| 1994 | Women in Film Crystal Award | Crystal Award | | Won | |
| 1999 | Satellite Awards | Best Motion Picture, Comedy or Musical | You've Got Mail | Nominated | |
| 2003 | The Best Plays of 2002–03 | Ten Best Plays of the New York season | Imaginary Friends | Won | |
| 2006 | Razzie Awards | Worst Director | Bewitched | Nominated | |
| 2006 | Razzie Awards | Worst Screenplay | Bewitched | Nominated | With Delia Ephron and Adam McKay |
| 2009 | Satellite Awards | Best Adapted Screenplay | Julie & Julia | Nominated | |
| 2009 | Casting Society of America | Golden Apple Award | | Won | With Delia Ephron |

== Bibliography ==
Books

- And Now Here's Johnny!. New York: Avon. 1968. OCLC 3302852.
- Wallflower at the Orgy. New York: Random House. 1970. ISBN 9780553385052. OCLC 145918739.
- Crazy Salad: Some Things About Women (1975), ISBN 9780394497358
- The Boston Photographs (1975)
- Scribble, Scribble: Notes on the Media (1978), ISBN 9780394501253
- Heartburn (1983, a novel)
- I Feel Bad About My Neck: And Other Thoughts on Being a Woman (2006)
- I Remember Nothing: And Other Reflections (2010)
- The Most of Nora Ephron (2013), ISBN 9780385350839

Essays and reporting

- "A sandwich". First Tastes. August 19 & 26, 2002. The New Yorker. 97 (27): 53. September 6, 2021. Archived from the original on August 31, 2021. (Note: Originally published in the August 19 & 26, 2002 issue.)

Critical studies, reviews and biographies

- Doidge, Kristin Marguerite (2022). Nora Ephron : a biography. Chicago: Chicago Review Press.
- Syme, Rachel (August 22, 2022). "The close reader". The Critics. Books. The New Yorker. 98 (25): 60–64. (Note: Online version is titled "The Nora Ephron we forget".)

———————

Bibliography notes

== See also ==
- List of American print journalists
- List of Jewish American authors
- List of playwrights from the United States
