= Lynn Bari =

American actress (1919–1989)

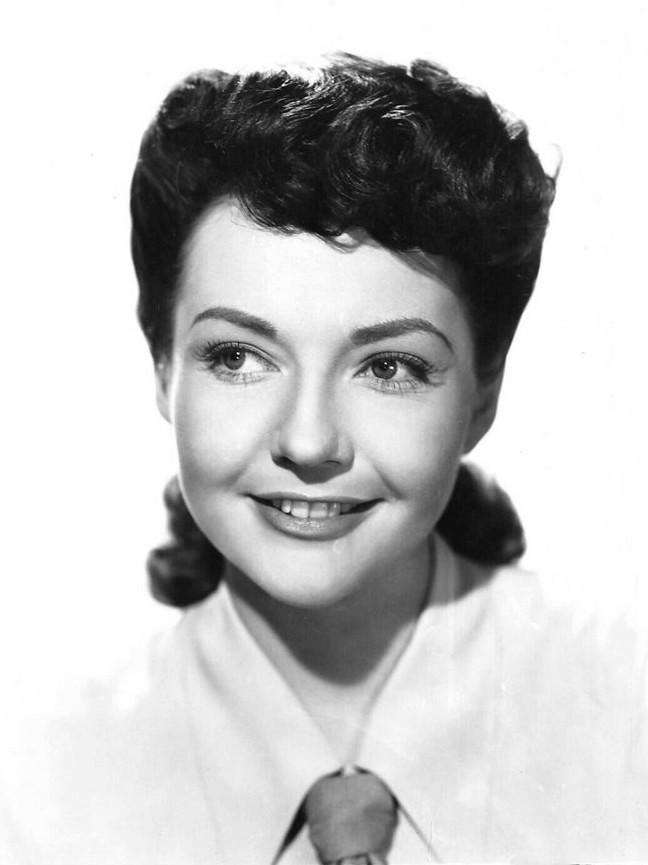
- Lynn Bari in the 1940s
- Born: Marjorie Schuyler Fisher; December 18, 1919; Roanoke, Virginia, U.S.
- Died: November 20, 1989 (aged 69); Santa Monica, California, U.S.
- Occupation: Actress
- Years active: 1933–1968
- Known for: Hello, Frisco, Hello
- Spouses: Walter Kane (m. 1939; div. 1943) Sidney Luft (m. 1943; div. 1950) Nathan Rickles (m. 1955; div. 1972)
- Children: 2

Lynn Bari (born Marjorie Schuyler Fisher; December 18, 1919 – November 20, 1989) was an American film actress who specialized in playing sultry, statuesque man-killers in roughly 150 films for 20th Century Fox, from the early 1930s through the 1940s.

== Early years ==
Bari was born on December 18, 1919, in Roanoke, Virginia, to John Manard Fisher of Lynchburg, Virginia, and his wife Marjorie Babcock Halpen, a native of Albany, New York. Her father was a successful auto sales manager who for many years worked for a Roanoke car dealership, Harper Motor. In 1925, he left his job and moved the family to his hometown, Lynchburg, where he opened a car dealership of his own. Two years later, heavily in debt and struggling to make a sizeable profit, he took his own life while away on a business trip by jumping out of a hotel window. After selling everything to settle debts his widow was left with little money to support her two children, John, her elder, Marjorie and her. To make ends meet, she arranged for her sister, Ellen, who with her husband lived in Melrose, Massachusetts, to take in her and her children. Failing to find work in Melrose she moved to Boston, where she met and soon married Reverend Robert Bitzer, a Religious Science minister, in March 1929.

Bari later recalled other children at school in Boston made life miserable for her brother and her, making constant fun of their obvious Southern accents. Determined to eliminate hers, she became involved with amateur theatrics and took elocution lessons. She was enthusiastic when at the age of 13 she was told her stepfather had been reassigned to Los Angeles, where he later became the head of the Institute of Religious Science.

When she was 14 and attending drama school, Bari adopted the stage name Lynn Barrie, a composite of the names of theater actress Lynn Fontanne and author J. M. Barrie. After reading a story about the Italian city of Bari, she decided to change the spelling.

== Career ==
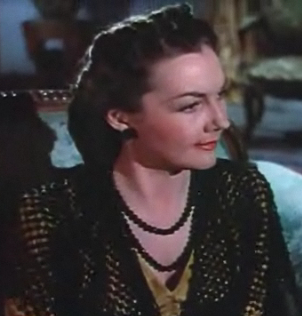
In the film Blood and Sand (1941)

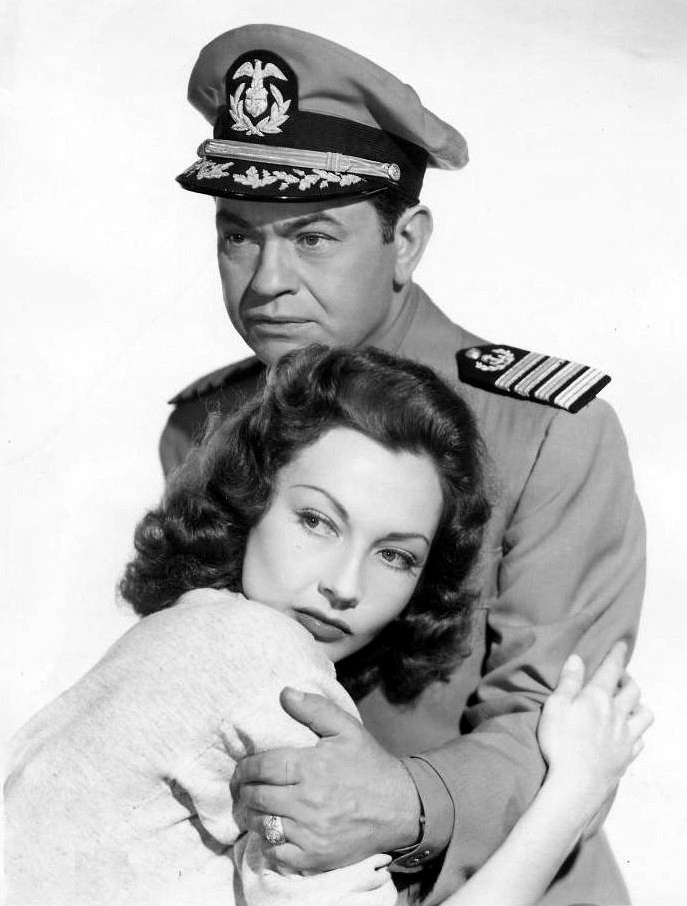
Bari and Edward G. Robinson in Tampico (1944)

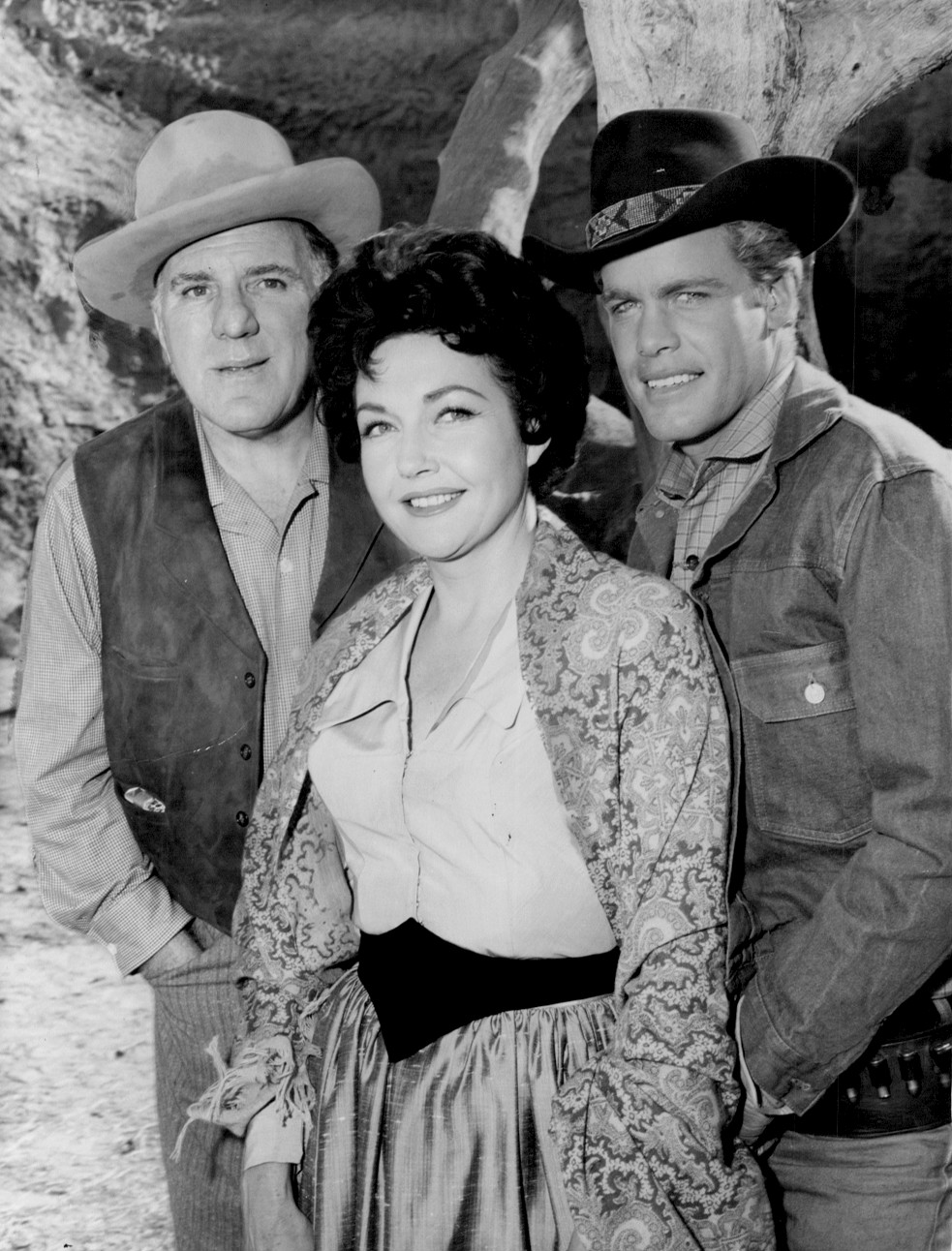
William Bendix, Bari, and Doug McClure in Overland Trail (1960)

Sixteen year-old Bari was one of 14 young women "launched on the trail of film stardom" August 6, 1935, when they each received a six-month contract with 20th Century Fox after spending 18 months in the company's training school. The contracts included a studio option for renewal for as long as seven years.

In most of her early films Bari had uncredited parts usually playing receptionists or chorus girls. She struggled to find starring roles in movies. Rare leading roles included China Girl (1942), Hello, Frisco, Hello (1943), and The Spiritualist (1948). In B movies, Bari was usually cast as a "man-killer", as in Orchestra Wives (1942), or a villainess, notably Shock and Nocturne (both 1946). An exception was the dramatic lead in The Bridge of San Luis Rey (1944). During World War II, according to a survey taken of GIs, Bari was the second-most popular pinup girl after the much better-known Betty Grable.

Bari's film career fizzled out in the early 1950s when she was just in her early 30s, but she continued to work at a limited pace over the next two decades, playing matronly characters rather than temptresses.

She portrayed the mother of a suicidal teenager in a 1951 drama On the Loose and a number of supporting parts. A flashy comedic role came her way the following year as the nouveau riche, snobbish mother in Douglas Sirk's Has Anybody Seen My Gal.

Bari's last film appearance was as the mother of rebellious teenager Patty McCormack in The Young Runaways (1968).

She quickly took up the rising medium of television during the 1950s; she starred in the live television sitcom Detective's Wife, which ran during the summer of 1950. In 1952, Bari starred in her own sitcom Boss Lady, a summer replacement for NBC's Fireside Theater. She portrayed Gwen F. Allen, the beautiful top executive of a construction firm.

In 1955, Bari appeared in the episode "The Beautiful Miss X" of Rod Cameron's City Detective. In 1960, she played female bandit Belle Starr in the debut episode "Perilous Passage" of Overland Trail.

Her final TV appearances were in episodes of The Girl From U.N.C.L.E. and The FBI.

Commenting on her "other woman" roles, Bari once said "I seem to be a woman always with a gun in her purse. I'm terrified of guns. I go from one set to the other shooting people and stealing husbands!"

In the 1960s, Bari toured in a production of Barefoot in the Park, playing the bride's mother.

== Personal life ==
In Foxy Lady (2010), an authorized biography by film historian Jeff Gordon written from interviews conducted shortly before her death, Bari suggested that, despite a 35-year career with over 166 film and television roles, a more promising career was sabotaged by unresolved problems with her domineering, alcoholic mother and her three marriages.

Bari was married to agent Walter Kane, producer Sidney Luft, and psychiatrist Nathan Rickles. Bari and Luft married November 28, 1943. They divorced December 26, 1950. She and Rickles wed August 30, 1955; they divorced in 1972. Bari's first child, a daughter with Luft, was born August 7, 1945, in St. John's Hospital in Santa Monica, California, but died the next day. Two years later, she had a son, John Michael Luft (b. 1948). John Michael was the subject of "a bitter custody battle" between Luft and Bari. A judge in Los Angeles ruled in Bari's favor in November 1958, ruling that the Luft household "was an improper place in which to rear the boy."

After retiring from acting in the 1970s, Bari moved to Santa Barbara, California. In her last years, she suffered increasing problems with arthritis.

== Death ==
On November 20, 1989, Bari was found dead in her home in Santa Monica, California, of an apparent heart attack. She was cremated and her ashes scattered at sea.

== Hollywood Walk of Fame ==
Bari has two stars on the Hollywood Walk of Fame, one for movies at 6116 Hollywood Boulevard, and one for television at 6323 Hollywood Boulevard.

== Filmography ==
- Meet the Baron (1933) as College Girl
- Dancing Lady (1933) as Chorus Girl
- I Am Suzanne (1933) as Audience Member
- Search for Beauty (1934) as Beauty Contestant Entrant
- Caravan (1934) as Blonde Gypsy Girl at Inn
- David Harum (1934) as Young Townswoman
- Coming Out Party (1934) as Party Guest
- Bottoms Up (1934) as Chorine
- Stand Up and Cheer! (1934) as White House Secretary / Chorine
- Handy Andy (1934) as Girl at Train Station
- 365 Nights in Hollywood (1934) as Showgirl
- Music in the Air (1934) as Dancer
- Charlie Chan in Paris (1935) as Club Patron
- Under Pressure (1935) as Blonde Brooklyn Girl
- The Great Hotel Murder (1935) as Wilson's Receptionist
- George White's 1935 Scandals (1935) as Chorine
- $10 Raise (1935) as Secretary
- Spring Tonic (1935) as Bridesmaid
- Doubting Thomas (1935) as Aspiring Actress
- The Daring Young Man (1935) as Bridesmaid
- Dante's Inferno (1935) as Beach Girl
- Curly Top (1935) as Amusement Park Patron
- Welcome Home (1935) as Bridesmaid
- Orchids to You (1935) as Southern Belle Shop Patron
- Redheads on Parade (1935) as Waitress
- Ladies Love Danger (1935) as Chorus Girl
- The Gay Deception (1935) as Royal Banquet Extra / Dance Extra
- Charlie Chan in Shanghai (1935) as Second Hotel Switchboard Operator
- Way Down East (1935) as Dancing Girl at Party
- Metropolitan (1935) as Chorus Girl
- Music Is Magic (1935) as Theatre Cashier
- Thanks a Million (1935) as Phone Operator
- The Man Who Broke the Bank at Monte Carlo (1935) as Flower Girl
- Show Them No Mercy! (1935) as Crowd Scene Member
- Professional Soldier (1935) as Gypsy Dancer
- King of Burlesque (1936) as Dancer
- My Marriage (1936) as Pat
- It Had to Happen (1936) as Secretary
- Song and Dance Man (1936) as Showgirl
- Everybody's Old Man (1936) as Secretary, Miss Burke
- The Great Ziegfeld (1936) as Ziegfeld Girl
- Gentle Julia (1936) as Young Lady Outside Church / Jealous Girl at Dance
- Private Number (1936) as Gambler
- Poor Little Rich Girl (1936) as Radio Station Receptionist
- 36 Hours to Kill (1936) as Traveler
- Girls' Dormitory (1936) as Student
- Sing, Baby, Sing (1936) as Hotel Telephone Operator
- Star for a Night (1936) as Chorus Girl
- Ladies in Love (1936) as Dress Shop Clerk
- 15 Maiden Lane (1936) as Crowd Scene Participant
- Pigskin Parade (1936) as Football Game Spectator
- Under Your Spell (1936) as Airplane Passenger
- Crack-Up (1936) as Office Worker
- Woman-Wise (1937) as Secretary
- On the Avenue (1937) as Chorus Girl / Mrs. Mary Jackson
- Time Out for Romance (1937) as Bridesmaid
- Love Is News (1937) as 'Babe' - Switchboard Operator
- Fair Warning (1937) as Candy Counter Girl
- Cafe Metropole (1937) as Cafe Patron
- This Is My Affair (1937) as Party Guest with Keller
- Sing and Be Happy (1937) as Secretary
- Wee Willie Winkie (1937) as Crowd Scene Participant
- She Had to Eat (1937) as Crowd Scene Participant
- Wake Up and Live (1937) as Chorus Girl
- The Lady Escapes (1937) as Bridesmaid
- You Can't Have Everything (1937) as Chorus Girl
- Wife, Doctor and Nurse (1937) as Party Girl
- Life Begins in College (1937) as Coed
- Lancer Spy (1937) as Miss Fenwick
- Ali Baba Goes to Town (1937) as Harem Girl
- 45 Fathers (1937) as Telephone Operator
- Love and Hisses (1937) as Nightclub Patron
- City Girl (1938) as Waitress
- The Baroness and the Butler (1938) as Klari - Maid
- Walking Down Broadway (1938) as Sandra De Voe
- Rebecca of Sunnybrook Farm (1938) as Myrtle
- Mr. Moto's Gamble (1938) as Penny Kendall
- Battle of Broadway (1938) as Marjorie Clark
- Josette (1938) as Mrs. Elaine Dupree
- Speed to Burn (1938) as Marion Clark
- Always Goodbye (1938) as Jessica Reid
- I'll Give a Million (1938) as Cecelia
- Meet the Girls (1938) as Terry Wilson
- Sharpshooters (1938) as Dianne Woodward
- Pardon Our Nerve (1939) as Terry Wilson
- The Return of the Cisco Kid (1939) as Ann Carver
- Chasing Danger (1939) as Renée Claire
- News Is Made at Night (1939) as Maxine Thomas
- Hotel for Women (1939) as Barbara Hunter
- Hollywood Cavalcade (1939) as Actress in 'The Man Who Came Back'
- Pack Up Your Troubles (1939) as Yvonne
- Charlie Chan in City in Darkness (1939) as Marie Dubon
- City of Chance (1940) as Julie Reynolds
- Free, Blonde and 21 (1940) as Carol Northrup
- Lillian Russell (1940) as Edna McCauley
- Earthbound (1940) as Linda Reynolds
- Pier 13 (1940) as Sally Kelly
- Kit Carson (1940) as Dolores Murphy
- Charter Pilot (1940) as Marge Duncan
- Sleepers West (1941) as Kay Bentley
- Blood and Sand (1941) as Encarnacion
- Sun Valley Serenade (1941) as Vivian Dawn
- We Go Fast (1941) as Rose Coughlin
- Moon Over Her Shoulder (1941) as Susan Rossiter
- The Perfect Snob (1941) as Chris Mason
- The Night Before the Divorce (1942) as Lynn Nordyke
- Secret Agent of Japan (1942) as Kay Murdock
- The Falcon Takes Over (1942) as Ann Riordan
- The Magnificent Dope (1942) as Claire Harris
- Orchestra Wives (1942) as Jaynie Stevens
- China Girl (1942) as Captain Fifi
- Hello, Frisco, Hello (1943) as Bernice Croft
- The Bridge of San Luis Rey (1944) as Michaela Villegas
- Tampico (1944) as Katherine 'Kathy' Hall
- Sweet and Low-Down (1944) as Pat Stirling
- Captain Eddie (1945) as Adelaide Frost Rickenbacker
- Shock (1946) as Nurse Elaine Jordan
- Home Sweet Homicide (1946) as Marian Carstairs
- Margie (1946) as Miss Isabel Palmer
- Nocturne (1946) as Frances Ransom
- Man From Texas (1948) as Zee Simms - alias Zee Heath
- The Amazing Mr. X (1948) as Christine Faber
- The Kid from Cleveland (1949) as Katherine Jackson
- I'd Climb the Highest Mountain (1951) as Mrs. Billywith
- On the Loose (1951) as Alice Bradley
- Sunny Side of the Street (1951) as Mary
- I Dream of Jeanie (1952) as Mrs. McDowell
- Has Anybody Seen My Gal (1952) as Harriet Blaisdell
- Francis Joins the WACS (1954) as Maj. Louise Simpson
- Abbott and Costello Meet the Keystone Kops (1955) as Leota Van Cleef
- The Women of Pitcairn Island (1956) as Maimiti
- Damn Citizen (1958) as Pat Noble
- Elfego Baca: Six Gun Law (1962) as Mrs. Simmons
- Trauma (1962) as Helen Garrison
- The Young Runaways (1968) as Mrs. Donford

== Television ==
- Science Fiction Theater (1955) one episode as Verda Wingate
- Ben Casey (1961) one episode as Ethel Dixon
- Ripcord (1963) one episode as Meg Collins
- Death Valley Days (1964) one episode as Belle Wilgus
- Perry Mason (1964 and 1965) one episode as Sylvia Cord; another episode as Ruth Duncan
- The Girl From U.N.C.L.E. (1967) one episode as Miss Twickum

== Radio appearances ==
Year	Program	Episode/source
1947	Rexall Summer Theater	Starred (with Pat O'Brien) in summer replacement for The Durante-Moore Show
1947	Suspense	July 24, 1947 “Murder by an Expert”
1952	Screen Guild Theatre	"Heaven Can Wait"
