= Rochelle Hudson =

Actress

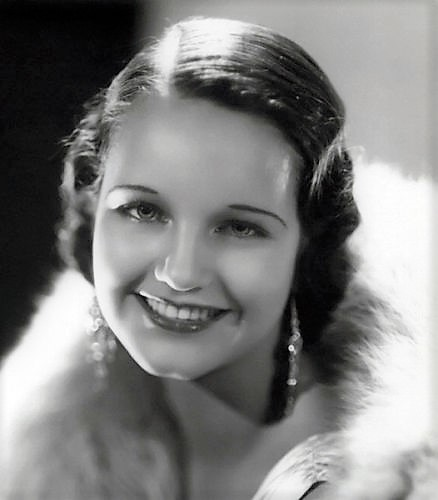
- Rochelle Hudson in the 1930s
- Born: Rachael Elizabeth Hudson; March 6, 1916; Oklahoma City, Oklahoma, U.S.
- Died: January 17, 1972 (aged 55); Palm Desert, California, U.S.
- Occupation: Actress
- Years active: 1930–1967
- Spouses: Harold Thompson (m. 1939; div. 1947) Dick Irving Hyland (m. 1948; div. 1950) Charles K. Brust (m. 1956, divorced) Robert L. Mindell (m. 1963; div. 1971)

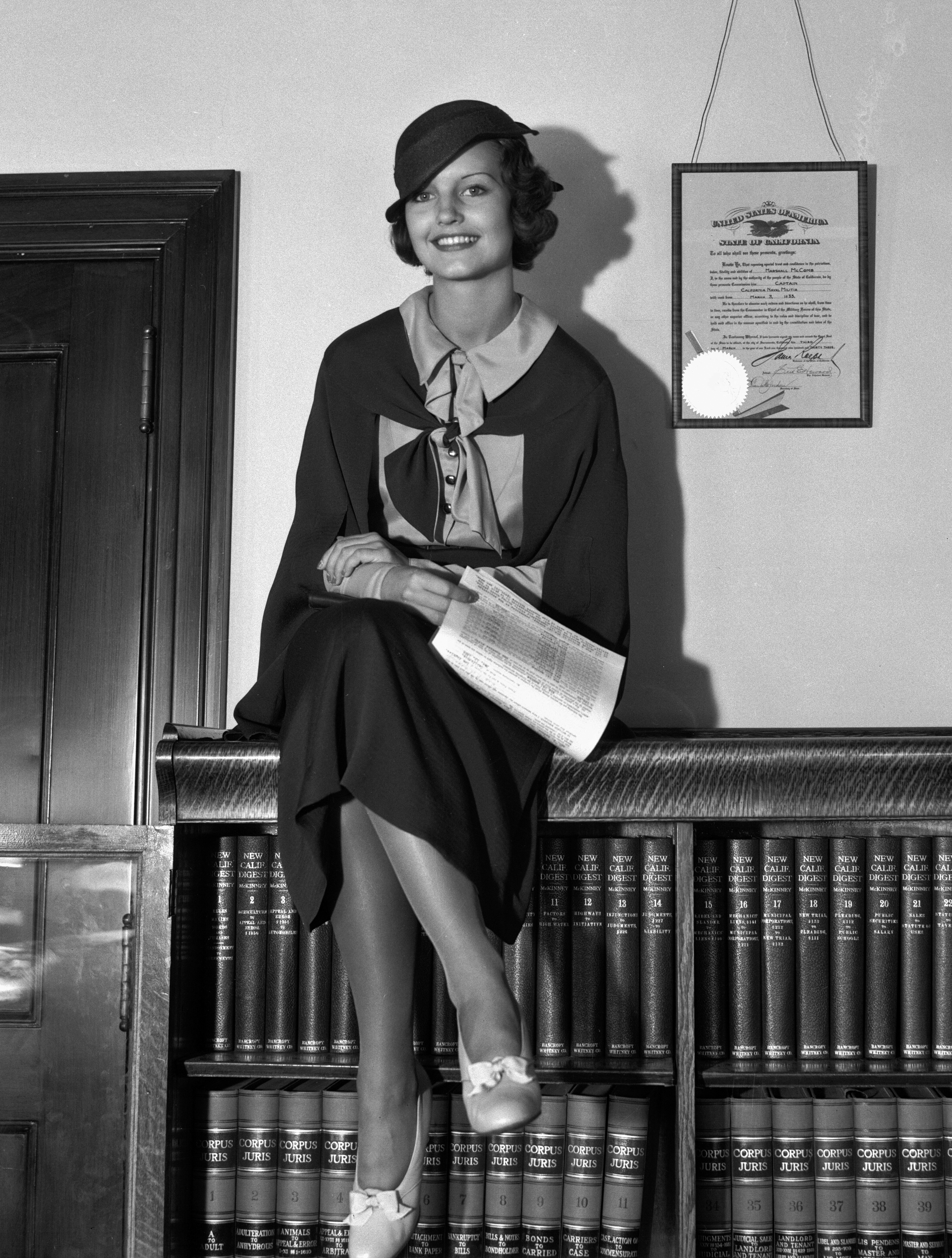
17-year-old Rochelle Hudson, 11 August 1933

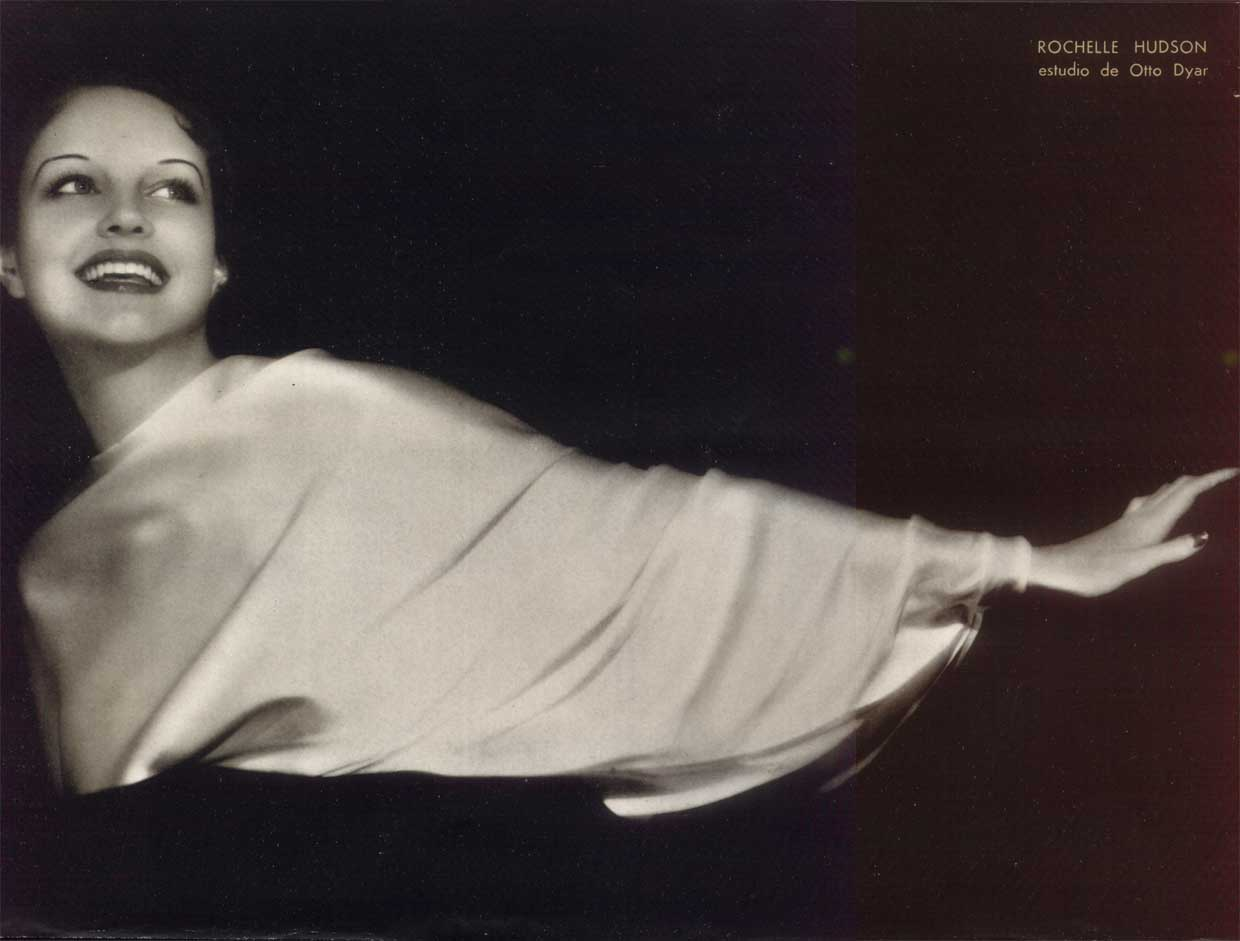
Rochelle Hudson in a Paramount Studios publicity photograph by Otto Dyar, for CINEGRAF magazine (Editorial Atlántida), Argentina

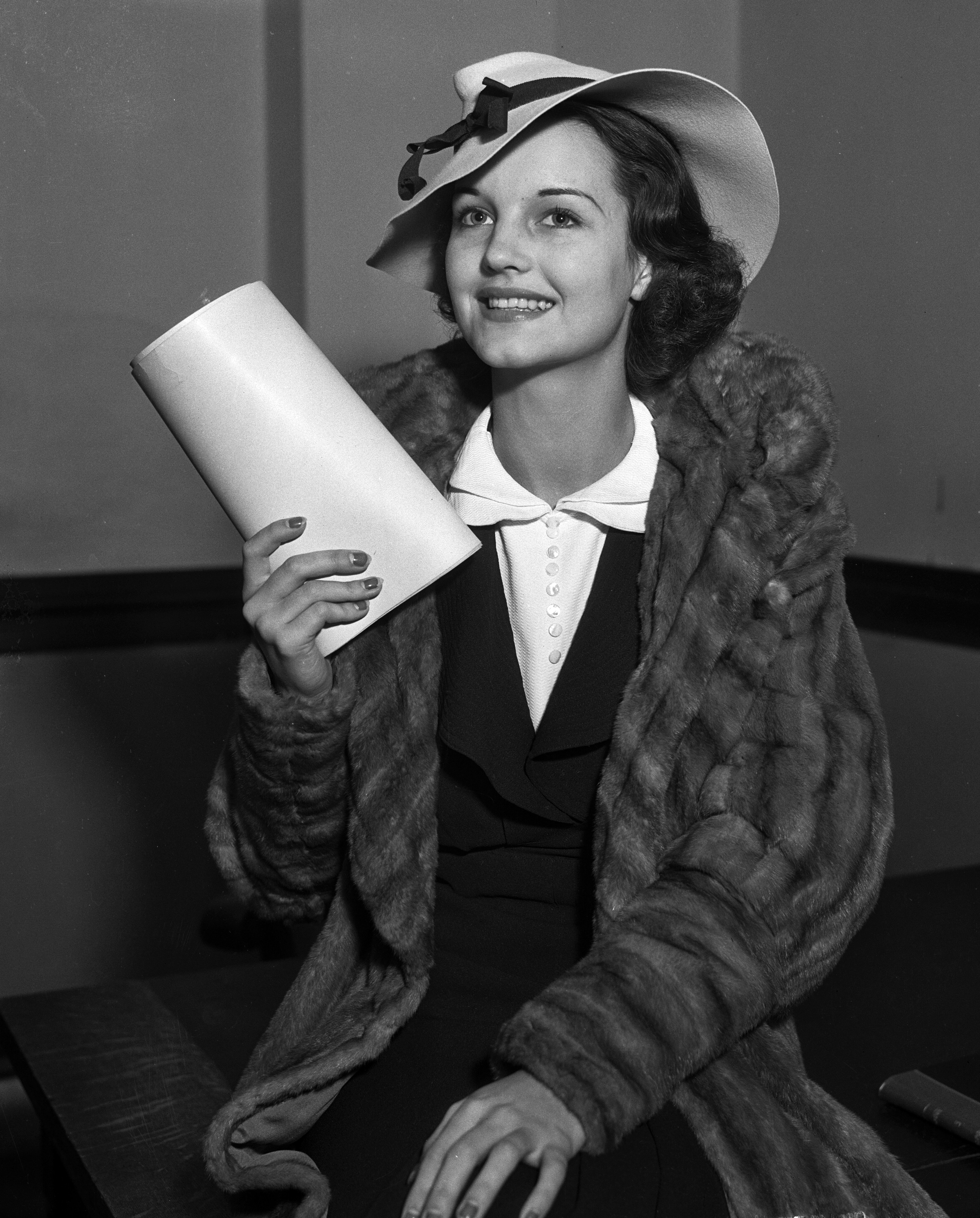
18-year-old Rochelle Hudson, 28 February 1935

Rochelle Hudson (born Rachael Elizabeth Hudson; March 6, 1916 – January 17, 1972) was an American film actress whose career spanned from 1930s through the 1960s. Hudson was a WAMPAS Baby Star in 1931.

== Early years ==
Hudson was born in Oklahoma City, Oklahoma, the daughter of Ollie Lee Hudson and Lenora Mae Hudson. While in Oklahoma, she studied dancing, drama, piano, and voice. Hudson began her acting career as a teenager, and completed her high school education at a high school on the Fox Studio Lot.

== Career ==
Hudson signed a contract with RKO Pictures on November 22, 1930, when she was 14 years old. She may be best remembered today for costarring in Wild Boys of the Road (1933), playing Cosette in Les Misérables (1935), playing Mary Blair, the older sister of Shirley Temple's character in Curly Top, and for playing Natalie Wood's mother in Rebel Without a Cause (1955), starring James Dean and Wood with Sal Mineo. She is also notable for voicing Bosko's girlfriend Honey in Harman-Ising's Looney Tunes cartoons released by Warner Bros. Pictures. Her last film role was in Dr. Terror's Gallery of Horrors (1967).

During her peak years in the 1930s, notable roles for Hudson included Richard Cromwell's love interest in the Will Rogers showcase Life Begins at 40 (1935); the daughter of carnival barker W.C. Fields in Poppy (1936); and Claudette Colbert's teenage daughter in Imitation of Life (1934). She played Sally Glynn, the fallen ingenue to whom Mae West imparts the immortal wisdom "When women go wrong, men go right after them!" in the 1933 Paramount film, She Done Him Wrong. In the 1954–55 television season, Hudson co-starred with Gil Stratton and Eddie Mayehoff in the sitcom That's My Boy, based on a 1951 Jerry Lewis and Dean Martin film of the same name.

== Personal life ==
Hudson was married four times. All the unions were childless. Her first marriage was to Harold Thompson, in 1939. He was the head of the Storyline Department at Disney Studios.

After their divorce in 1947 (although the trade publication Billboard reported that they divorced on September 4, 1945), she married a second time the following year, to Los Angeles Times sportswriter Dick Irving Hyland. The marriage lasted two years before the couple divorced. Hudson married her third husband, Charles K. Brust, in Jackson, Missouri on September 28, 1956.

Little is known of the marriage other than they were divorced by June 1962 (he remarried). Hudson's final marriage was to Robert Mindell, a hotel executive. The two remained together for eight years before they divorced in 1971.

Hudson actually was born in 1916, but the studio reportedly made her two years older for her to play a wider variety of roles, including romantic roles. In That's My Boy, she was cast as the mother of Gil Stratton, who was only six years her junior.

== Death ==
In 1972, Hudson was found dead in her home at the Palm Desert Country Club. A business associate with whom she had been working in real estate discovered her body sprawled on the bathroom floor. She was 55 years old. Hudson died of a heart attack brought on by a liver ailment.

== Filmography ==
- Laugh and Get Rich (1931) as Miss Jones - at Dance (uncredited)
- Everything's Rosie (1931) as Lowe Party Guest by Punch Bowl (uncredited)
- Fanny Foley Herself (1931) as Carmen
- Are These Our Children (1931) as Mary
- Girl Crazy (1932) as San Luz Señorita (uncredited)
- Is My Face Red? (1932) as Newlywed Bride on Leviathon (uncredited)
- Beyond the Rockies (1932) as Betty Allen
- Hell's Highway (1932) as Mary Ellen
- Secrets of the French Police (1932) as K-31
- The Savage Girl (1932) as The Girl
- The Penguin Pool Murder (1932) as Telephone Operator
- The Past of Mary Holmes (1933) as Betty
- She Done Him Wrong (1933) as Sally
- Lucky Devils (1933) as Visitor
- Scarlet River (1933) as Rochelle Hudson (uncredited)
- Love Is Dangerous (1933) as Gwendolyn
- Notorious But Nice (1933) as Constance Martin
- Doctor Bull (1933) as Virginia (Muller) / Banning
- Wild Boys of the Road (1933) as Grace
- Walls of Gold (1933) as Joan Street
- Mr. Skitch (1933) as Emily Skitch
- Harold Teen (1934) as Lillian 'Lillums' Lovewell
- Such Women Are Dangerous (1934) as Vernie Little
- Bachelor Bait (1934) as Cynthia Douglas
- Judge Priest (1934) as Virginia Maydew
- Imitation of Life (1934) as Jessie Pullman
- The Mighty Barnum (1934) as Ellen
- I've Been Around (1935) as Drue Waring
- Life Begins at 40 (1935) as Adele Anderson
- Les Misérables (1935) as Cosette
- Curly Top (1935) as Mary Blair
- Way Down East (1935) as Anna Moore
- Show Them No Mercy! (1935) as Loretta Martin
- The Music Goes 'Round (1936) as Susanna Courtney
- Everybody's Old Man (1936) as Cynthia Sampson
- The Country Beyond (1936) as Jean Alison
- Poppy (1936, with W.C. Fields) as Poppy
- Reunion (1936) as Mary MacKenzie
- Woman-Wise (1937) as Alice Fuller
- That I May Live (1937) as Irene Howard
- Born Reckless (1937) as Sybil Roberts
- She Had to Eat (1937) as Ann Garrison
- Rascals (1938) as Margaret Adams
- Mr. Moto Takes a Chance (1938) as Victoria Mason
- Storm Over Bengal (1938) as Joan Lattimore
- Pride of the Navy (1939) as Gloria Tyler
- Pirates of the Skies (1939) as Barbara Whitney
- Missing Daughters (1939) as Kay Roberts
- Smuggled Cargo (1939) as Marian Franklin
- Konga, the Wild Stallion (1939) as Judith Hadley
- A Woman Is the Judge (1939) as Justine West
- Convicted Woman (1940) as Betty Andrews
- Men Without Souls (1940) as Suzan Leonard
- Island of Doomed Men (1940) as Lorraine Danel
- Babies for Sale (1940) as Ruth Williams
- Girls Under 21 (1940) as Frances White Ryan
- Meet Boston Blackie (1941) as Cecelia Bradley
- The Stork Pays Off (1941) as Irene Perry
- The Officer and the Lady (1941) as Helen Regan
- Rubber Racketeers (1942) as Nikki
- Queen of Broadway (1942) as Sherry Baker
- Bush Pilot (1947) as Hilary Ward
- Devil's Cargo (1948) as Margo Delgado
- Sky Liner (1949) as Amy Winthrop
- Roots in the Soil (1949)
- Rebel Without a Cause (1955) as Judy's mother
- Strait-Jacket (1964) as Emily Cutler
- The Night Walker (1964) as Hilda
- Dr. Terror's Gallery of Horrors (1967) as Helen Spalding (final film role)

== Sources ==
- Forty Years of Screen Credits, 1929-1969. Two volumes. Compiled by John T. Weaver. Metuchen, NJ: Scarecrow Press, 1970. Entries begin on page 57.
- Biography and Genealogy Master Index. Farmington Hills, Mich.: Gale, Cengage Learning. 1980–2009.
