= Irving Caesar =

American composer and lyricist (1895–1996)

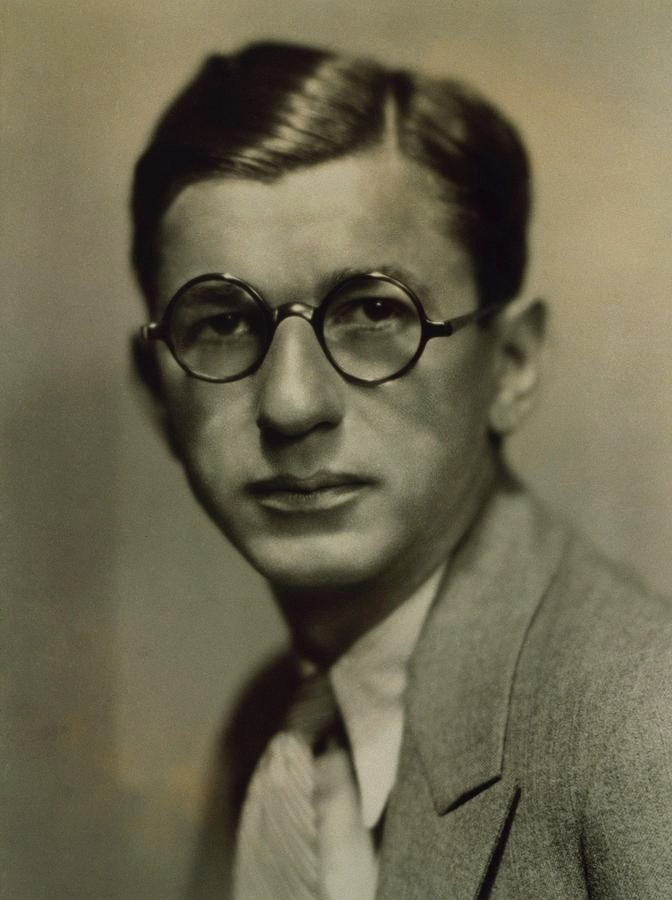
- Caesar in 1930

Background information
- Born: Isidor Keiser; July 4, 1895; New York City, U.S
- Died: December 17, 1996 (aged 101) New York City, U.S
- Occupation: Lyricist
- Years active: 1918–1994
- Spouse: Christina Ballesteros (m. 1994)

Irving Caesar (born Isidor Keiser, July 4, 1895 – December 17, 1996) was an American lyricist and composer primarily for theater who wrote lyrics for numerous song standards, including "Swanee", "Sometimes I'm Happy", "Crazy Rhythm", and "Tea for Two", one of the most frequently recorded tunes ever written. In 1972, he was inducted into the Songwriters Hall of Fame.

== Biography ==
Caesar, the son of Morris Keiser, a Romanian Jewish lawyer and socialist, was born in New York City, United States. His older brother Arthur Caesar was a successful Hollywood screenwriter. Around 1901, Caesar composed his first poem. The Caesar brothers spent their childhood and teen years in Carnegie Hill, Yorkville, the same Manhattan neighborhood where the Marx Brothers were raised. He was educated at Chappaqua Mountain Institute in Chappaqua, New York.

In his career, Caesar collaborated with a wide variety of composers and songwriters, including Rudolf Friml, George Gershwin, Sigmund Romberg, Victor Herbert, Ted Koehler and Ray Henderson. Two of his best known numbers, "I Want to Be Happy" and "Tea for Two", were written with Vincent Youmans for the 1925 musical No, No, Nanette. Another of his biggest hits, "Animal Crackers in My Soup", was popularized by Shirley Temple in her 1935 film Curly Top. "Just a Gigolo", his 1929 adaptation of an Austrian song, was a hit for Louis Prima in the 1950s and again for David Lee Roth in the 1980s.

In the late 1930s, along with composer Gerald Marks, he wrote a series of children's songs focusing on safety. Caesar made hundreds of appearances in schools performing the "Sing a Song of Safety," "Sing a Song of Friendship" (a United Nations-inspired series focusing on world peace, racial tolerance and friendship) and "Songs of Health" collections.

Caesar served on the songwriters' performance-rights organization ASCAP board of directors from 1930 to 1946 and again from 1949 to 1966. He was a founder of the Songwriters Guild of America. He died, aged 101, in New York on December 18, 1996.

== Broadway credits ==
Note: All productions are musicals unless otherwise stated.

Swanee
Al Jolson's hit 1920 recording of George Gershwin and Irving Caesar's 1919 "Swanee".

- La La Lucille (1919) – additional lyrics
- Kissing Time (1920) – adaptation of an earlier version of this musical – co-lyricist
- Pins and Needles (1922) – revue – co-lyricist
- The Greenwich Village Follies of 1922 (1922) – revue – co-lyricist and co-bookwriter
- The Greenwich Village Follies of 1923 (1923) – revue – co-lyricist
- The Greenwich Village Follies of 1924 (1924) – revue – co-lyricist
- Betty Lee (1924) – co-lyricist
- No, No, Nanette (1925) – co-lyricist
- Charlot Revue (1925) – revue – featured lyricist for "Gigolette" and "A Cup of Coffee, a Sandwich and You"
- Yes, Yes, Yvette (1926, Chicago; 1927, Broadway) – lyricist
- Sweetheart Time (1926) – co-lyricist
- Ziegfeld's Revue "No Foolin'" (1926) – revue – co-lyricist
- Betsy (1926) – co-bookwriter
- Talk About Girls (1927) – lyricist
- Here's Howe (1928) – lyricist
- Americana of 1928 (1928) – revue – co-lyricist
- Polly (1929) – co-composer and co-lyricist
- George White's Scandals of 1929 (1929) – revue – co-composer and co-lyricist
- Ripples (1930) – co-lyricist
- Nina Rosa (1930) – lyricist
- The Wonder Bar (1931) – play – co-playwright/adaptor of the original German
- George White's Scandals of 1931 (1931) – revue – co-bookwriter
- George White's Music Hall Varieties of 1932 (1932) – revue – co-composer and lyricist
- Melody (1933) – lyricist
- Shady Lady (1933) – reviser
- Continental Varieties (1934) – revue – dialogue-writer
- The White Horse Inn (1936) – English-version lyricist
- My Dear Public (1943) – co-composer, co-lyricist, and co-bookwriter

Post-retirement credits:

- The American Dance Machine (1978) – dance revue – featured lyricist
- Up in One (1979) – revue – featured songwriter
- Big Deal (1986) – featured English-version lyricist for "Just a Gigolo"
- Sally Marr...and her escorts (1994) – play – featured lyricist for "Tea for Two"
