= Helen Wood (actress) =

American actress

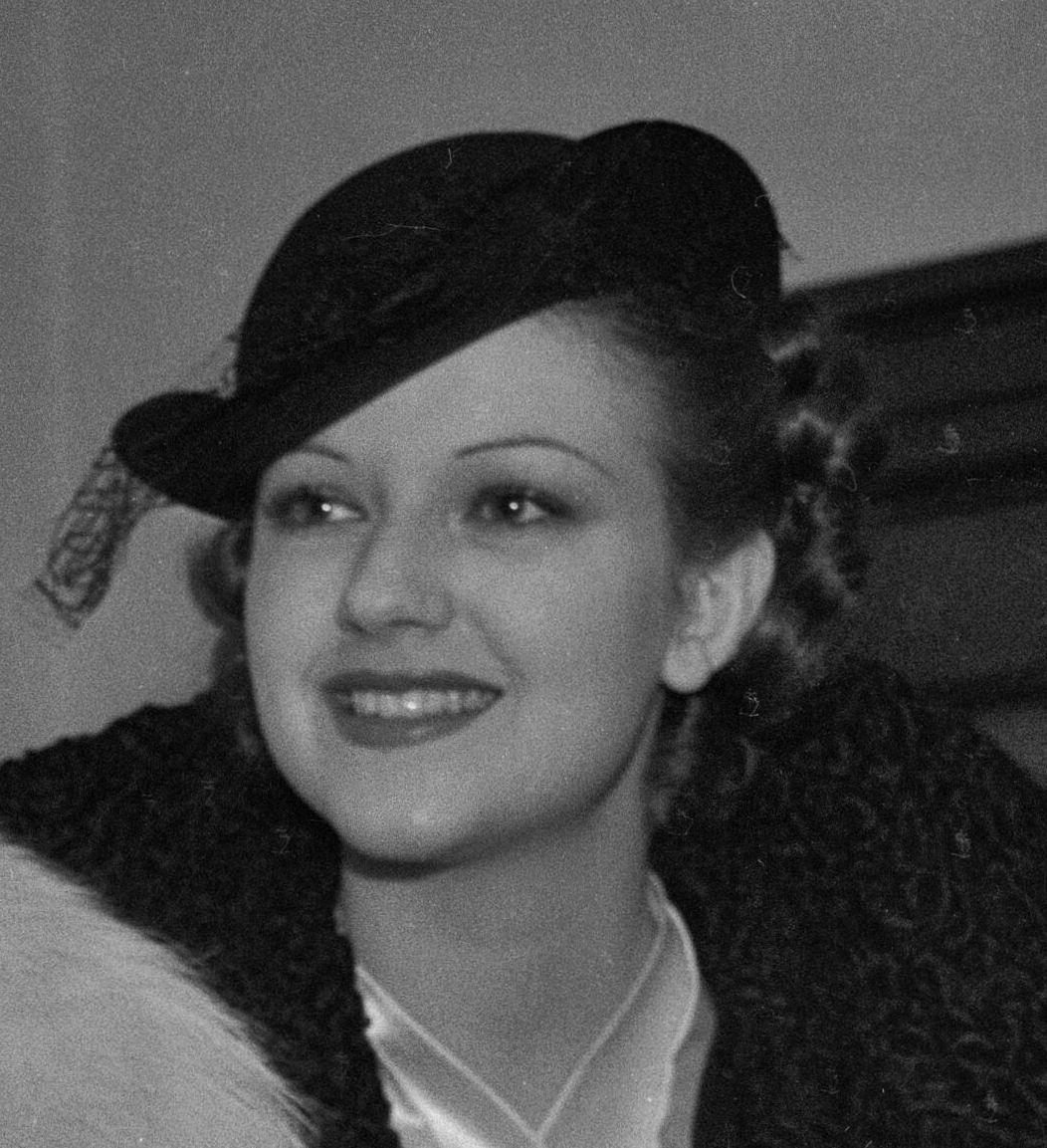
- Wood in 1935
- Born: June 4, 1917; Clarksville, Tennessee, US
- Died: February 8, 1988 (aged 70); Los Angeles, California, US
- Occupation: Actress
- Years active: 1933–1949
- Spouses: Alfred Huenergardt (m. 1940, divorced) Erle Henriksen (m. 1942)

Helen Wood (June 4, 1917 – February 8, 1988) was an American actress active in film and radio primarily during the 1930s. She is not to be confused with the actress and performer Helen [Ann] Wood (1935–1998), who later appeared in Deep Throat.

== Biography ==
Wood was born in Clarksville, Tennessee, to Edwin Wood (who worked in real estate and insurance) and Hazel Case. She had a younger sister, Mary Martha.

After winning a beauty contest at Clarksville's Capitol Theatre in 1933 as a teenager, Wood earned a trip to Hollywood, where she was cast in Roman Scandals (1933). She then returned to Clarksville to finish high school. Upon her return to Hollywood after graduation, she signed a contract with MGM.

She reportedly spent $4,000 on a vocal coach who helped her drop her Southern accent. She later signed at 20th Century Fox, where she was made to compete for parts against fellow actresses Rita Hayworth (then Margarita Cansino) and Dixie Dunbar. On-screen, she was frequently paired with actor Thomas Beck. Supposedly she had to back out of a big role due to an illness early on in her career.

She also worked in radio in the late 1930s.

== Personal life ==
In December 1940, Wood married Dr. Alfred Huenergardt; the marriage ended in divorce. In October 1942, she married Dr. Erle Henriksen. She died in Los Angeles on February 8, 1988.

== Selected filmography ==
- Roman Scandals (1933)
- Moulin Rouge (1934)
- Kid Millions (1934)
- Gold Diggers of 1935 (1935)
- Mary Jane's Pa (1935)
- In Caliente (1935)
- Anna Karenina (1935)
- She Married Her Boss (1935)
- The Goose and the Gander (1935)
- A Midsummer Night's Dream (1935)
- My Marriage (1936)
- Champagne Charlie (1936)
- High Tension (1936)
- Charlie Chan at the Race Track (1936)
- Sing, Baby, Sing (1936)
- Can This Be Dixie? (1936)
- Crack-Up (1936)
- Almost a Gentleman (1939)
- Sorority House (1939)
- The Pilgrimage Play (1949)
