= My Marriage =

1936 film by George Archainbaud

- Directed by: George Archainbaud
- Screenplay by: Frances Hyland
- Produced by: Sol M. Wurtzel
- Starring: Claire Trevor; Kent Taylor; Pauline Frederick; Paul Kelly; Helen Wood; Thomas Beck
- Cinematography: Barney McGill
- Edited by: Alex Troffey
- Production company: 20th Century Fox
- Distributed by: 20th Century Fox
- Release date: January 31, 1936
- Running time: 73 minutes
- Country: United States
- Language: English

My Marriage is a 1936 American drama film directed by George Archainbaud and written by Frances Hyland. The film stars Claire Trevor, Kent Taylor, Pauline Frederick, Paul Kelly, Helen Wood and Thomas Beck. The film was released on January 31, 1936, by 20th Century Fox.

== Cast ==
- Claire Trevor as Carol Barton
- Kent Taylor as John DeWitt Tyler III
- Pauline Frederick as Mrs. DeWitt Tyler II
- Paul Kelly as Barney Dolan
- Helen Wood as Elizabeth Tyler
- Thomas Beck as Roger Tyler
- Beryl Mercer as Mrs. Dolan
- Henry Kolker as Major Vaile
- Colin Tapley as Sir Philip Burleigh
- Noel Madison as Marty Harris
- Ralf Harolde as Jones
- Charles Richman as H.J. Barton
- Frank Dawson as Saunders
- Lynn Bari as Pat
- Barbara Blane as Doris
- Paul McVey as Detective
