= Animal Crackers in My Soup =

Song
- Composer: Ray Henderson
- Lyricists: Irving Caesar; Ted Koehler Josephine Drexel

"Animal Crackers in My Soup" is a song introduced by Shirley Temple in the film Curly Top (1935). The lyrics were written by Irving Caesar and Ted Koehler and the music by Ray Henderson; the sheet music was published by Sam Fox Publishing Company.

Numerous singles and albums including the Shirley Temple version of the song have been issued, including at least one CD with it as title track.

It was recorded by Don Bestor and his orchestra (Brunswick 7495) and Mae Questel, voice of Betty Boop and Olive Oyl, released a recording of the song in the 1930s.

Two members of The Irish Rovers, one of whom is dressed up like Temple, sing the song in one sketch as part of one of the 1971 episodes of The Irish Rovers Show. The song was performed by Elke Sommer on The Muppet Show in 1979. It was also on the Anne Murray album There's a Hippo in My Tub.

Another cover version appears on the 2002 album Maria Muldaur Presents - Animal Crackers In My Soup: Songs Of Shirley Temple. Barbra Streisand performed the first verse of this song in her "Color Me Barbra Medley" for the television special and album Color Me Barbra.

The song was covered by Joanie Bartels on her 1980 Sillytime Magic album, releasing it as a single, and was also on the video The Rainy Day Adventure and it also appeared on the compilation album The Stars of Discovery Music. The song is performed by Sammee Lee Jones (as a lookalike of Temple) in the 1971 film What's the Matter with Helen?.

An updated recording of the song was used as theme music for the 1985 Australian TV series Zoo Family.
