= Champagne Charlie (1936 film) =

1936 film by James Tinling

- Directed by: James Tinling
- Written by: Allen Rivkin; Gene Markey
- Produced by: Edward T. Lowe Jr.
- Starring: Paul Cavanagh; Helen Wood; Thomas Beck
- Cinematography: Daniel B. Clark
- Edited by: Nick DeMaggio
- Music by: Samuel Kaylin
- Production company: 20th Century Fox
- Distributed by: 20th Century Fox
- Release date: May 8, 1936
- Running time: 59 minutes
- Country: United States
- Language: English

Champagne Charlie is a 1936 American crime drama film directed by James Tinling and starring Paul Cavanagh, Helen Wood and Thomas Beck. It was produced and distributed by 20th Century Fox.

== Plot ==
"Champagne" Charlie Courtland is a smooth, sophisticated and highly unethical gambler, plying his trade among the rich and famous. Charlie's backers hope for a huge financial windfall when he begins to court beautiful young heiress Linda Craig.

== Cast ==
- Paul Cavanagh as Charlie Cortland
- Helen Wood as Linda Craig
- Thomas Beck as Tod Hollingsworth
- Minna Gombell as Lillian Wayne
- Herbert Mundin as Mr. James Augustus Fipps
- Noel Madison as Pedro Gorini
- Montagu Love as Ivan Suchine
- Delma Byron as Iris
- Alan Edwards as Valaroff
- Madge Bellamy as Woman in Cab
