= Charlie Chan at the Race Track =

1936 film by H. Bruce Humberstone

- Directed by: H. Bruce Humberstone
- Written by: Lou Breslow; Saul Elkins
- Produced by: John Stone
- Starring: Warner Oland
- Cinematography: Harry Jackson
- Music by: Samuel Kaylin
- Distributed by: 20th Century Fox
- Release date: August 7, 1936
- Running time: 70 minutes
- Country: United States
- Language: English

Charlie Chan at the Race Track is the 12th film in the 20th Century Fox-produced Charlie Chan series starring Warner Oland in the title role.

== Plot ==
When a prominent racehorse owner winds up dead-allegedly kicked to death by his prized stallion, Charlie Chan is called in to investigate. But when the indomitable detective discovers evidence of foul play, he's soon hot on the hooves of an international gambling ring with an evil plot to turn the racetracks of the world into a trifecta of terror!

== Cast ==
- Warner Oland as Charlie Chan
- Keye Luke as Lee Chan
- Helen Wood as Alice Fenton
- Thomas Beck as Bruce Rogers
- Alan Dinehart as George Chester
- Gavin Muir as Bagley
- Gloria Roy as Catherine Chester
- Jonathan Hale as Warren Fenton
- George Irving as Major Kent
- Max Wagner as Joe
- Paul Fix as Lefty
- John Rogers as Mooney
- Frankie Darro as Tip Collins
- Frank Coghlan Jr as Eddie Brill
- John H. Allen as Streamline Jones

== Critical reception ==
A review of the film in The New York Times described it as a "wholesome film [that] follows Hollywood's latest adaptation from Greek tragedy, dictated for all we know by the Hays office, of having its murders done offstage somewhere," that "the miscreants, (there are a lot of them) simply litter the shop with false clues," and reported that "The unswerving Mr. Chan leaves the sniffing of herring trails to his son, Lee, a singularly unhelpful character."

== See also ==
- List of films about horses
- List of films about horse racing
