= Tampico (film) =

1944 film by Lothar Mendes

- 1944 theatrical poster
- Directed by: Lothar Mendes
- Written by: Ladislas Fodor
- Screenplay by: Kenneth Gamet; Richard Macaulay; Fred Niblo Jr.
- Produced by: Robert Bassler
- Starring: Edward G. Robinson; Lynn Bari; Victor McLaglen
- Cinematography: Charles G. Clarke
- Edited by: Robert Fritch
- Music by: David Raksin
- Production company: 20th Century Fox
- Distributed by: 20th Century Fox
- Release date: April 10, 1944 (U.S.)
- Running time: 75 minutes
- Country: United States
- Language: English

Tampico is a 1944 drama/war film directed by Lothar Mendes and starring Edward G. Robinson, Lynn Bari, Victor McLaglen, Marc Lawrence, and Mona Maris. It was released by 20th Century Fox.

== Plot ==
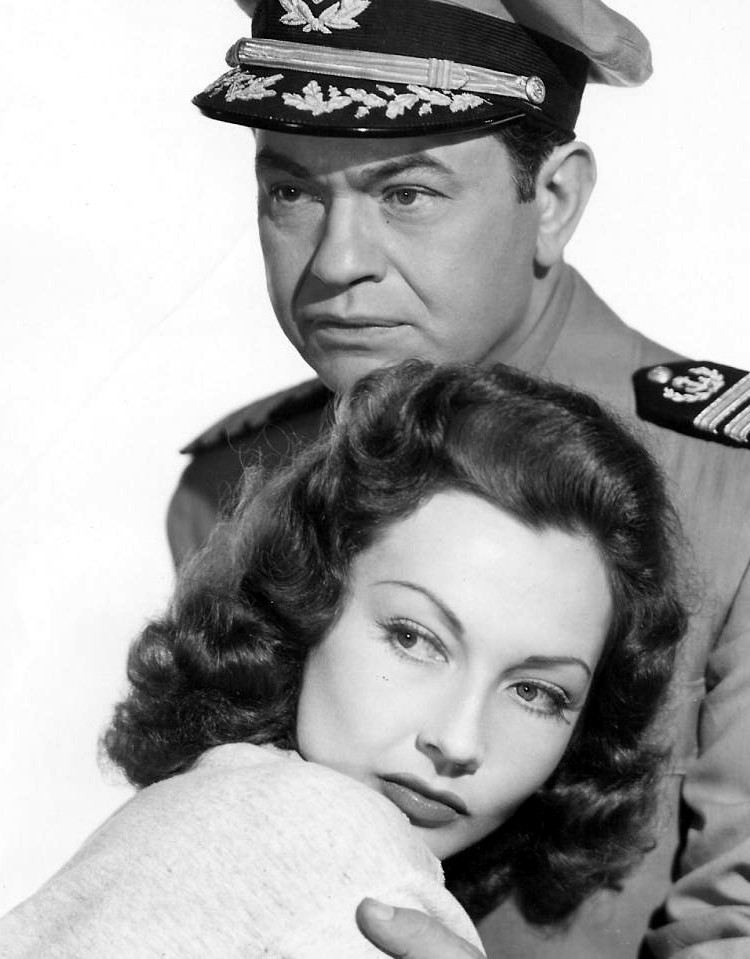
Lynn Bari with Edward G. Robinson

Capt. Bart Manson is the captain of an oil tanker during World War II, who rescues Katherine Hall when her ship is sunk by a German U-boat. The couple marry, but Manson's ship is subsequently sunk as well. Hall becomes a prime suspect for involvement as she was carrying no identification when rescued. However Manson later discovers that his First Mate Fred Adamson is in fact a German agent responsible for the sinking, and Hall is cleared of any culpability.

== Cast ==
- Edward G. Robinson as Capt. Bart Manson
- Lynn Bari as Katherine 'Kathy' Hall
- Victor McLaglen as Fred Adamson
- Robert Bailey as Second Mate Watson
- Marc Lawrence as Valdez
- Edward James Ballantine as Silhouette Man
- Mona Maris as Dolores Garcia
- Tonio Selwart as Kruger
- Ann Corcoran as Karla
