= George Hassell (disambiguation) =

George Hassell (1888–1928) was an American mass murderer.

George Hassell may also refer to:

- George Hassell (actor) (1881–1937), American stage and film actor
- George Hassell (footballer) (1923–2012), Australian rules footballer
