= Delma Byron =

American dancer and actress (1913–2006)

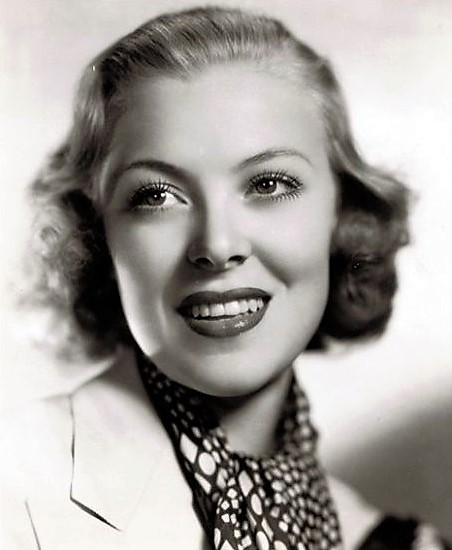
- Delma Byron
- Born: Sara Delma Bynum; July 31, 1913; Weakley County, Tennessee
- Died: May 29, 2006 (aged 92)
- Other names: Brook Byron; Sally Bynum; Sally Bynam
- Occupations: Actress, dancer
- Years active: 1935-1962

Sara Delma Byron (July 31, 1913 – May 29, 2006) was an American dancer and actress. She also acted under the names Sally Bynum, Sally Bynam and Brook Byron. It was under this name that she portrayed Sally Cato MacDougall in Auntie Mame.

== Career ==
The daughter of Sam and Minnie Pearl Harris Bynum, Byron was born in Weakley County, Tennessee but lived in Akron, Ohio as a teenager, attending Garfield High School.

She attended Murray College for one year. Leaving college, she became a dancer in a touring troupe The Band Box Revue. Later, she became a model, attracting attention from Hollywood as her picture appeared on magazine covers. In 1936, Byron received a stock contract from 20th Century Fox, giving her a chance in films.

Her Broadway credits include The Leading Lady (1948) and Up in Central Park (1945). As Sally Bynum', she performed in Life Begins at 8:40 (1934) and Roberta (1933) on Broadway. On radio, Byron portrayed Diane Pers in the soap opera Kate Hopkins, Angel of Mercy.

== Filmography ==
Year	Title	Role	Notes
1935	Professional Soldier	Gypsy Dancer	Uncredited
1936	Everybody's Old Man	Miss Martin	
1936	Champagne Charlie	Iris	Uncredited
1936	Dimples	Betty Loring	
1936	Laughing at Trouble	Mary Bradford	
1954	Lady in the Dark	Mother	TV movie
1958	Auntie Mame	Sally Cato MacDougall	

She also appeared on television in The Untouchables, Richard Diamond, Private Detective, M Squad and others.
