= China Girl (1942 film) =

1942 film by Henry Hathaway

- Theatrical release poster
- Directed by: Henry Hathaway
- Written by: Ben Hecht; Darryl F. Zanuck
- Produced by: Ben Hecht
- Starring: Gene Tierney; George Montgomery; Lynn Bari; Victor McLaglen
- Cinematography: Lee Garmes
- Edited by: James B. Clark
- Music by: Hugo Friedhofer; Alfred Newman
- Production company: 20th Century Fox
- Distributed by: 20th Century Fox
- Release date: December 9, 1942
- Running time: 96 minutes
- Country: United States
- Language: English
- Box office: $1.4 million (US rentals)

China Girl is a 1942 drama film which follows the exploits of an American newsreel photographer in China and Burma against the backdrop of World War II. The film stars Gene Tierney, George Montgomery, Lynn Bari and Victor McLaglen, and was directed by Henry Hathaway. It is also known as A Yank In China, Burma Road and Over The Burma Road.

== Plot ==
In Luzhou, China, news cameraman Johnny Williams is taken into custody by the Japanese military. He is offered $20,000 to take pictures of the Burma Road, a vital link for Allied supply that had been built to support the Chinese war effort. He is not interested.

Johnny is put back into his cell, together with a Canadian, "Major" Bull Weed, who claims to be serving as a Chinese irregular. His confederate, 'Captain' Fifi, smuggles a gun in during a faked tempestuous farewell, and the two men escape.

They rendezvous with Fifi, who says she saw a plane nearby at an abandoned airfield. Johnny, an ex-barnstormer expert at flying biplanes, pilots them all through a hail of Burmese anti-aircraft fire to safety in Mandalay. Upon their arrival, he bumps into his old pal, Captain Shorty Maguire, a mercenary pilot with the U.S. staffed "Flying Tigers" defending China against the Japanese.

Johnny is asked to join up, but again declines to take sides. He discovers that instead of grabbing his confiscated press credentials while fleeing Luchow, the document he picked up is something in Japanese. Bull manages to decipher just two words, and Johnny quickly loses interest upon sighting a beautiful woman nearby.

Haoli Young has just returned from New York, where she is in school at Vassar. She tells him that her father, Dr. Young, has a home in the city, and that she is selling off the last of her family's valuable possessions to fund a mission school he runs for orphans in Kunming. Johnny ends up walking there, and is introduced to him. Once alone, he presses a kiss on her, which is dispassionately received by the reserved Eurasian woman. Feeling jilted, he goes back to his hotel and picks up Fifi.

When he brings Fifi back to his room, Haoli is there waiting for him. He promptly drops Fifi, only to learn from Haoli that Fifi and Bull are Japanese agents, and, by association, Johnny is suspected of being one too. Johnny realizes that he has been played by the pair, but tricks them into replacing the camera equipment he needs to photograph the Burma Road - this time for a big payday from the Western press. He then tells them to get out of Mandalay or he will turn them in as Japanese agents.

Johnny stays in Mandalay, waiting to be flown over the Burma Road by his pal Shorty by tagging along on one of his solo reconnaissance flights. He meets with Haoli again and over a week of courting falls in love with her. However, just that fast she is gone with her father to Kunming, at the far end of the Burma Road. The shock sends Johnny on a bender.

Bull reports back to his Japanese commander and is ordered to retrieve the document Johnny accidentally had taken, evidently containing military plans for an upcoming campaign against the Burma Road. When Johnny wakes up in his hotel after his night out drinking, Fifi is there to warn him that Bull is coming for him. She has fallen in love with him and wants him to run away with her. She tells him that Kunming will be bombed by the Japanese shortly, which instead only sends Johnny racing there after Haoli.

He flies there with Shorty, arriving immediately after a terrible air raid which killed her father. Johnny helps save some children who were trapped in a toppled building. During the rescue, Haoli is also killed, sending Johnny mad with grief. He rushes up to the top of a building, mans a machine gun, and downs a Japanese fighter.

== Cast ==
- Gene Tierney as Haoli Young
- George Montgomery as Johnny Williams
- Lynn Bari as Captain Fifi
- Victor McLaglen as Major Bull Weed
- Alan Baxter as Flyer Bill Jones
- Sig Ruman as Jarubi
- Myron McCormick as Shorty McGuire
- Robert Blake as Chandu
- Ann Pennington as Sugar Fingers, the Entertainer
- Philip Ahn as Dr. Kai Young
- Tom Neal as Captain Haynes
- Paul Fung as Japanese Governor
- Lal Chand Mehra as Desk Clerk
- Kam Tong as Japanese Doctor
