= George Hassell (actor) =

English actor (1881–1937)

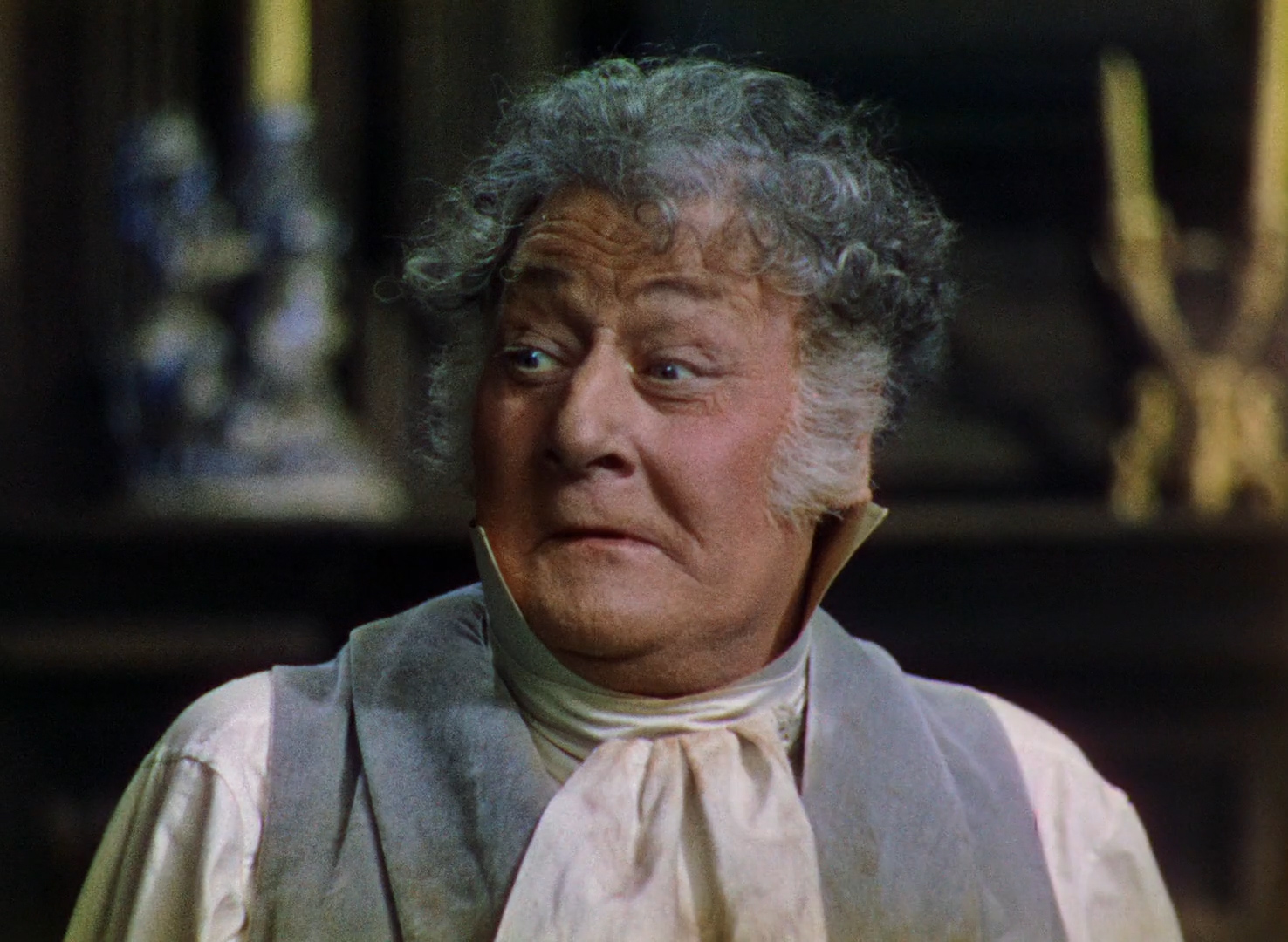
- George Hassell in Becky Sharp (1935)
- Born: Alfred Kenedon Jeffrys Halse; 4 May 1881; Birmingham, England
- Died: 17 February 1937 (aged 55); Chatsworth, California, U.S.
- Occupations: Stage & Film Actor
- Years active: 1915–1937

see also George Hassell (disambiguation)

George Hassell (born Alfred Kenedon Jeffrys Halse; 4 May 1881 – 17 February 1937) was an English actor who had roles in Captain Blood (1935), La Bohème (1926), and Becky Sharp (1935). He died of a heart attack in Chatsworth, California, age 55.

== Filmography ==
Year	Title	Role	Notes
1915	Old Dutch	Harry Bennett	
1926	La Bohème	Schaunard	
1935	Night Life of the Gods	Bacchus	
1935	The Flame Within	Mr. Rigby	
1935	Becky Sharp	Sir Pitt Crawley	
1935	Dressed to Thrill	Henri	
1935	Captain Blood	Governor Steed	
1936	Petticoat Fever	Captain Landry	
1936	The King Steps Out	Herlicka	
1936	A Son Comes Home	Captain	
1936	Girls' Dormitory	Dr. Wilfinger	
1936	White Hunter	Valentine Ponsonby-Smith	
1937	Woman-Wise	John De Witt	
1937	Wee Willie Winkie	Maj. MacMonachie	Uncredited
1937	Think Fast, Mr. Moto	Robert Hitchings Sr.	Uncredited, (final film role)
