= Can This Be Dixie? =

1936 film by George Marshall

- Directed by: George Marshall
- Written by: George Marshall; Lamar Trotti
- Produced by: Sol M. Wurtzel
- Starring: Jane Withers; Slim Summerville; Helen Wood; Thomas Beck; Sara Haden; Claude Gillingwater; Donald Cook
- Cinematography: Bert Glennon; Ernest Palmer
- Edited by: Louis R. Loeffler
- Music by: Emil Gerstenberger; Joe Glover; Samuel Kaylin; Gene Rose
- Distributed by: 20th Century Fox
- Release date: November 13, 1936
- Running time: 70 minutes
- Country: United States
- Language: English

Can This Be Dixie? is a 1936 American musical comedy film directed by George Marshall and featuring child star Jane Withers along with Slim Summerville and Helen Wood.

In 1937 and 1938, Withers became one of the top 10 box-office stars in the United States, despite her status as Fox's second-tier child star (behind Shirley Temple). On a shooting schedule that allowed 21 to 24 days per picture, she acquired the nickname "One-Take Withers", and produced four or five films a year.

The level of comedy can be assessed by the names of the characters, the names of the musical numbers ("Pick, Pick, Pickaninny," "Uncle Tom's Cabin is a Cabaret Now"), and the fact that Withers appeared in blackface. Some even more racially offensive material was challenged by co-star Hattie McDaniel and removed from the picture.

== Plot ==
Peg Gurgle, who, with her uncle Robert E. Lee Gurgle, runs a traveling musical patent medicine show through the deep south. When they encounter a plantation owner named Colonel Robert E. Lee Peachtree, their luck picks up when the Colonel buys a bottle of their elixir for each one of his plantation field hands. When the sheriff impounds their wagon, the Gurgles stay on with the Colonel and helps defend his mansion against Yankees and bankers.

== Cast ==
- Jane Withers as Peg Gurgle
- Slim Summerville as Robert E. Lee Gurgle
- Helen Wood as Virginia Peachtree
- Thomas Beck as Ulysses S. Sherman
- Sara Haden as Miss Beauregard Peachtree
- Claude Gillingwater as Col. Robert Peachtree
- Donald Cook as Longstreet Butler
- James Burke as Sheriff N.B.F. Rider
- Jed Prouty as Ed Grant
- Hattie McDaniel as Lizzie
- Troy Brown Sr. as Jeff Davis Brunch
- Robert Warwick as Gen. Beauregard Peachtree
- Billy Bletcher as John P. Smith Peachtree
- William Worthington as George Washington Peachtree
- Otis Harlan as Thoma Jefferson Peachtree
