= Woman-Wise =

1937 film by Allan Dwan

- Theatrical release poster
- Directed by: Allan Dwan
- Screenplay by: Ben Markson
- Produced by: Sol M. Wurtzel
- Starring: Rochelle Hudson; Michael Whalen; Thomas Beck; Alan Dinehart; Douglas Fowley; George Hassell
- Cinematography: Robert H. Planck
- Edited by: Alfred DeGaetano
- Production company: 20th Century Fox
- Distributed by: 20th Century Fox
- Release date: January 22, 1937
- Running time: 62 minutes
- Country: United States
- Language: English

Woman-Wise is a 1937 American crime film directed by Allan Dwan and written by Ben Markson. The film stars Rochelle Hudson, Michael Whalen, Thomas Beck, Alan Dinehart, Douglas Fowley and George Hassell. The film was released on January 22, 1937, by 20th Century Fox.

== Cast ==
- Rochelle Hudson as Alice Fuller
- Michael Whalen as Tracey Browne
- Thomas Beck as Clint De Witt
- Alan Dinehart as Richards
- Douglas Fowley as Stevens
- George Hassell as John De Witt
- Astrid Allwyn as 'Bubbles' Carson
- Chick Chandler as Bob Benton
- Pat Flaherty as Duke Fuller
