= Rawhide (1951 film) =

1951 film by Henry Hathaway

- Theatrical release poster
- Directed by: Henry Hathaway
- Written by: Dudley Nichols
- Produced by: Samuel G. Engel
- Starring: Tyrone Power; Susan Hayward
- Narrated by: Gary Merrill
- Cinematography: Milton R. Krasner
- Edited by: Robert L. Simpson
- Music by: Sol Kaplan; Lionel Newman
- Color process: Black and white
- Production company: Twentieth Century-Fox
- Distributed by: Twentieth Century-Fox
- Release date: March 25, 1951 (New York)
- Running time: 89 minutes
- Country: United States
- Language: English
- Box office: $1,950,000 (U.S. rentals)

Rawhide is a 1951 American Western film produced by Twentieth Century-Fox. It was directed by Henry Hathaway, produced by Samuel G. Engel from a screenplay by Dudley Nichols and stars Tyrone Power, Susan Hayward, Hugh Marlowe, Dean Jagger, Edgar Buchanan, Jack Elam and George Tobias. The music score was composed by Sol Kaplan, the song "A Rollin' Stone" was written by Lionel Newman, and the cinematographer was Milton R. Krasner. The film is unrelated to the 1959-1965 CBS television series of the same title.

== Plot ==
Tom Owens is the clean-cut and sophisticated gentleman son of J. C. Owens of the Overland Mail Company. His father wants Tom to learn the business from the ground up, so he sends Tom west to remote relay station Rawhide Pass to take lessons from stationmaster Sam Todd, whom he has known for more than 40 years. Tom is now eagerly anticipating his return to civilization in one week.

A strong-willed woman named Vinnie Holt and her very young niece Callie arrive on a coach on their way east. Holt's sister was killed in a bar brawl along with Callie's father Johnny back in Vacaville, California, and she is taking Callie to her paternal grandparents in the east. As her stage prepares to depart Rawhide, the U.S. Cavalry arrives from the east with the news that four convicts escaped from Huntsville prison, held up a stagecoach that had passed through Rawhide and killed the driver, who was Sam's friend. The convicts are after a gold shipment expected to pass through Rawhide the following day. The cavalry intends to escort Holt's coach on its way east, but children are not permitted to ride a coach into a dangerous situation, and when Holt refuses the driver's command to leave Callie at the station, she is forcibly removed from the coach by Owens, but she then insists on taking Owens' room for the night.

Holt takes Callie, along with Owens' gun, to the nearby hot springs for a bath. While they are gone, a man approaches the outpost on horseback. Todd and Owens are leery knowing that it could be one of the escaped convicts, so Owens approaches while Todd hides in the stable tack room with his rifle. The man flashes a deputy sheriff's badge from Huntsville, saying that he is hunting the escaped convicts, so Owens gives Todd the all-clear signal. However, they soon learn that the man is Rafe Zimmerman, the convict who had escaped from Huntsville the day before his scheduled hanging for the murder of his girlfriend and her lover. Zimmerman then signals the other three convicts to ride into town. They are hardcore outlaw Tevis, simpleton Yancy and obedient Gratz, all of whom were around Zimmerman when he made his prison break.

Holt and Callie return from bathing in time to hide and see Todd shot in the back by Tevis after Todd makes a break for the rifle that he had left in the stable. They are discovered when Callie cries, but Owens' gun is left under the horse trough. The convicts all assume that Holt is Owens' wife, as their items are in the same bedroom. When Holt hears this, she is indignant and wants to tell them that she has no connection to Owens, but Owens persuades her that her best chance of staying alive with the baby is to pretend to be his wife. Zimmerman knows that they need an official from the company there when the last coach passes through that night, as he will assure the cavalry to the east that all is well, and the best way to convince Owens to do this is to leave his wife and baby alone.

After the last coach passes, Owens grabs a kitchen knife, and he and Holt spend the night frantically attempting to bore a hole in the clay brick wall of the bedroom in which they are held. Before they can create a hole large enough to permit escape, the knife breaks. Dawn comes, and Owens is summoned to prepare the station for the stagecoach. While Holt is distracted, Callie crawls through the small hole. Fearing for Callie's safety, Holt screams to be released from the room. When Tevis opens the door, he forces himself on her. Owens hears this and tries to come to her aid, but is knocked unconscious by Zimmerman in the melee. Zimmerman thinks that he has wrested control of Tevis but turns his back on him to return to Owens, allowing Tevis to shoot him in the back. Gratz is also shot by Tevis while Yancy flees into hiding.

Owens regains consciousness but is shot running across the yard. He takes the gun from under the horse trough and is then engaged in a gunfight with Tevis as the next stage approaches. Callie wanders back into the yard and Tevis threatens to kill her if Owens will not surrender his gun and present himself to be killed. Owens complies, but as he walks to his sure death, Holt is able to recover Gratz's rifle and saves Owens by killing Tevis. The gold-filled stagecoach then arrives with Yancy aboard. When asked what has happened, Owens replies to the stage driver, "Learning the business, Jim. Just learning the business."

== Cast ==
- Tyrone Power as Tom Owens
- Susan Hayward as Vinnie Holt
- Edgar Buchanan as Sam Todd
- Hugh Marlowe as Rafe Zimmerman
- Jack Elam as Tevis
- George Tobias as Gratz
- Dean Jagger as Yancy
- Jeff Corey as Luke Davis
- James Millican as Tex Squires
- Louis Jean Heydt as Fickert
- Judy Ann Dunn as Callie

== Reception ==
In a contemporary review for The New York Times, critic Thomas M. Pryor wrote: "With only one set and a screen play by Dudley Nichols which covers a fitfully dramatic situation, director Henry Hathaway has turned out a surprisingly good entertainment. Mr. Hathaway's camera is confined to a small area, but it moves meaningfully and does much to create and sustain an atmosphere of tension. ... Although the action is sparse, Mr. Hathaway has expertly juggled the suspense elements of the script so that the picture generally holds one's attention. ... 'Rawhide' may not be a prize addition to the screen's vast Western library, but it is sufficiently different to warrant attention."
