= She Had to Eat =

1937 film by Malcolm St. Clair

- Theatrical release poster
- Directed by: Malcolm St. Clair
- Screenplay by: Samuel G. Engel
- Story by: James Edward Grant; M.M. Musselman
- Produced by: Samuel G. Engel
- Starring: Jack Haley; Rochelle Hudson; Arthur Treacher; Eugene Pallette; Douglas Fowley; John Qualen
- Cinematography: Barney McGill
- Edited by: Louis R. Loeffler
- Music by: Samuel Kaylin
- Production company: 20th Century-Fox
- Distributed by: 20th Century-Fox
- Release date: July 2, 1937
- Running time: 74 minutes
- Country: United States
- Language: English

She Had to Eat is a 1937 American comedy film directed by Malcolm St. Clair and written by Samuel G. Engel. The film stars Jack Haley, Rochelle Hudson, Arthur Treacher, Eugene Pallette, Douglas Fowley and John Qualen. It was released on July 2, 1937, by 20th Century-Fox.

== Plot ==
A gangster-comedy. Rochelle Hudson (Ann Garrison) is a gourmand whose vocation is freeloading. She forms an alliance with an Arizona gas station owner, Carter (Arthur Treacher), who bears a strong resemblance to a notorious criminal, "Baby Face Burns." As such, Carter is subjected to a number of misadventures, including his abduction by rival gangsters for ransom. A wealthy industrialist, who possesses his own railway carriage, embraces Carter as his offspring while he is inebriated. When he sobers, he has no recollection of his adoptive “son.”

== Cast ==
- Jack Haley as Danny Decker
- Rochelle Hudson as Ann Garrison
- Arthur Treacher as Carter
- Eugene Pallette as Raymond Q. Nash
- Douglas Fowley as Duke Stacey
- John Qualen as Sleepy
- Maurice Cass as Fingerprint Expert
- Wallis Clark as Ralph Wilkinson
- Lelah Tyler as Mrs. Cue
- Tom Kennedy as Pete
- Tom Dugan as Rusty
- Franklin Pangborn as Mr. Phoecian-Wylie
- Florence Gill as Singer (uncredited)
- Ruth Peterson as Waitress (uncredited)
- Sidney Bracey as Waiter (uncredited)
- Bud Geary as Policeman (uncredited)
