= White Hunter (film) =

1936 film by Irving Cummings

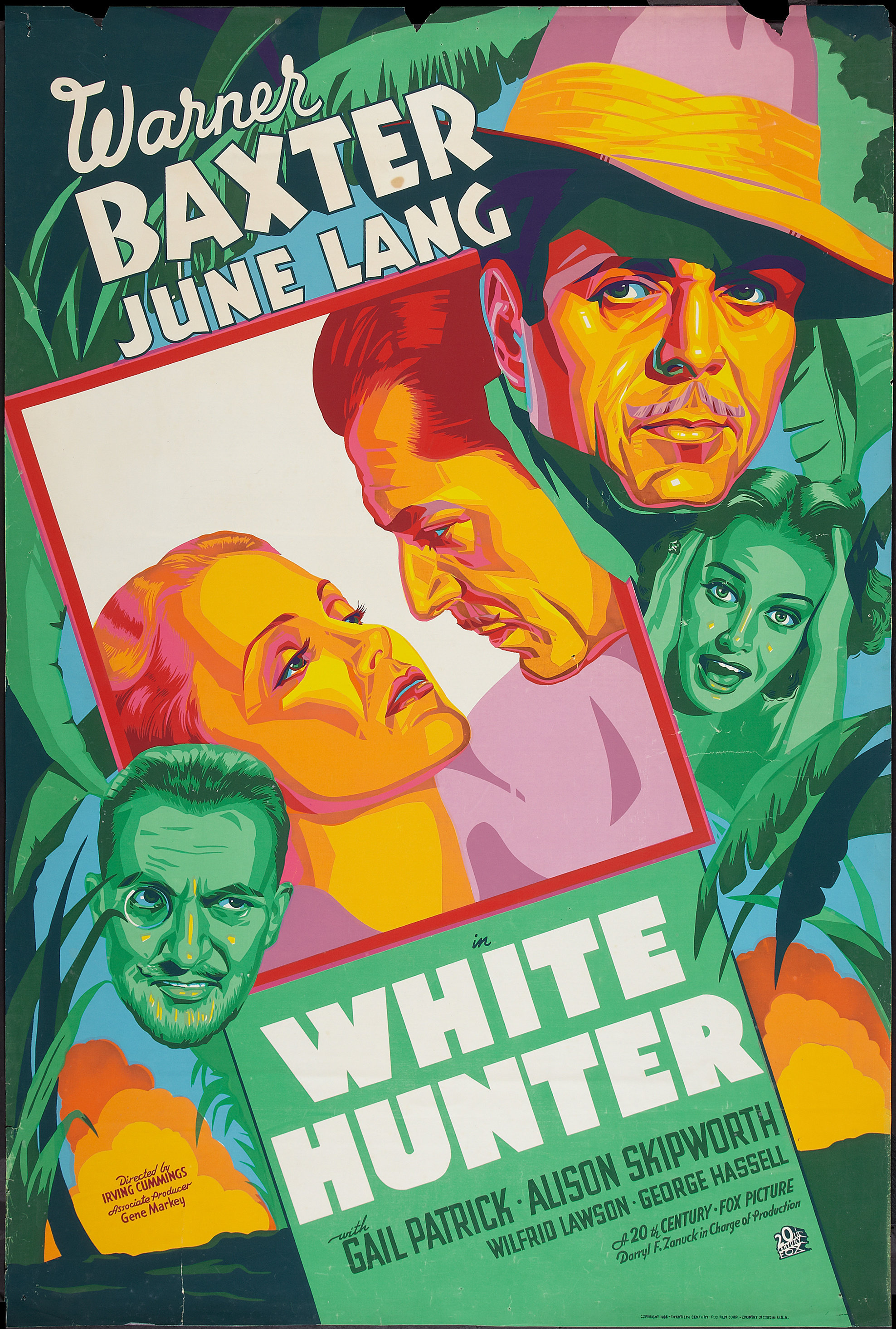
- Theatrical release poster
- Directed by: Irving Cummings
- Screenplay by: Sam Duncan; Kenneth Earl; Georg Wilhelm Pabst
- Story by: Gene Markey
- Produced by: Darryl F. Zanuck
- Starring: Warner Baxter; June Lang; Gail Patrick; Alison Skipworth; Wilfrid Lawson; George Hassell
- Cinematography: Chester A. Lyons
- Edited by: Allen McNeil
- Music by: Arthur Lange; Charles Maxwell
- Production company: 20th Century Fox
- Distributed by: 20th Century Fox
- Release date: November 25, 1936
- Running time: 65 minutes
- Country: United States
- Language: English

White Hunter is a 1936 American adventure film directed by Irving Cummings and written by Sam Duncan, Kenneth Earl and Georg Wilhelm Pabst. The film stars Warner Baxter, June Lang, Gail Patrick, Alison Skipworth, Wilfrid Lawson and George Hassell. The film was released on November 25, 1936, by 20th Century Fox.

== Plot ==
Safari guide is hired by the man who was responsible for his father's death.

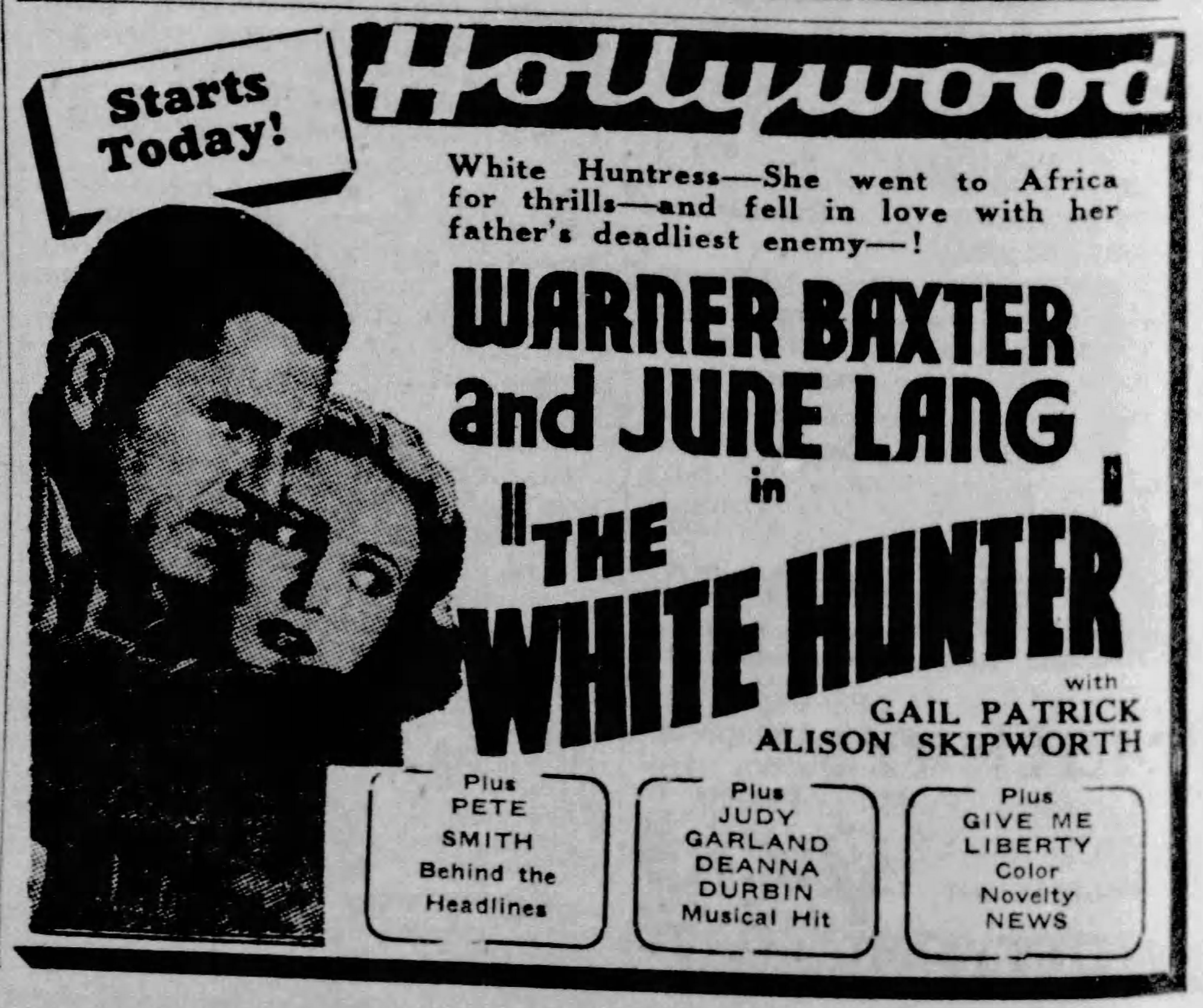
Ad for the film

== Cast ==
- Warner Baxter as Capt. Clark Rutledge
- June Lang as Toni Varek
- Gail Patrick as Helen Varek
- Alison Skipworth as Aunt Frederika
- Wilfrid Lawson as Michael Varek
- George Hassell as Valentine Ponsonby-Smith
- Ernest Whitman as Abdi
- Forrester Harvey as Pembrooke
- Willie Fung as Wong
- Olaf Hytten as Barton
- Ralph Cooper as Ali
- Will Stanton as Harry

== Critical reception ==
John T. McManus of the The New York Times described the film as "A forlorn safari in search of a plot."

In their March, 1937 edition, Modern Screen gave the film a one-star review and found very little to recommend it, commenting, "Before a background of obviously studio-manufactured jungle, Warner Baxter …. goes down to defeat at the hands of an impossible script." June Lang was described as managing "to look at all times as though she had just dropped into the jungle on her way home from the beauty parlor", Gail Patrick’s performance was described as "properly menacing" and Alison Skipworth was given credit for trying "in vain to lend comedy to the piece."
