= Crack-Up (1936 film) =

1936 film by Malcolm St. Clair

- 1936 theatrical poster
- Directed by: Malcolm St. Clair
- Screenplay by: Charles Kenyon; Sam Mintz
- Based on: Crack-Up; 1936 story in American Magazine by John F. Goodrich
- Produced by: Samuel G. Engel
- Starring: Peter Lorre; Brian Donlevy
- Cinematography: Barney McGill
- Edited by: Fred Allen
- Music by: Samuel Kaylin; Sidney Clare and Harry Akst (Song: "Top Gallants"); George P. Costello (sound) (credited as G.P. Costello); Harry M. Leonard (sound)
- Production company: 20th Century Fox
- Distributed by: 20th Century Fox
- Release dates: December 14, 1936 (New York City) (Note: Crack-Up has been variously listed as both a 1936 and 1937 release.); January 2, 1937 (U.S.)
- Running time: 65 minutes
- Country: United States
- Language: English

Crack-Up is a 1936 American drama film directed by Malcolm St. Clair. Peter Lorre plays a harmless, half-addled aircraft enthusiast who is actually a ruthless spy desperate to get his hands on the blueprints for an experimental aircraft for a trans-Atlantic flight. He faces off against Ace Martin, played by Brian Donlevy, the pilot of the aircraft, whose motives are spurred by feeling cheated by his own company. The supporting cast includes Helen Wood, Ralph Morgan and Thomas Beck.

== Plot ==
Although shot on a Hollywood sound stage, the dangerous repair of the "Wild Goose" used a full-size mock-up model of a futuristic airliner.

At the christening of the "Wild Goose," an experimental long-range aircraft designed for trans-Atlantic flights, a number of significant industry figures from the Fleming-Grant Airways Corporation are present. President John R. Fleming (Ralph Morgan) introduces the test pilots, Ace Martin (Brian Donlevy) and Joe Randall (Thomas Beck), along with Joe's fiancée, Ruth Franklin (Helen Wood). The eccentric Colonel Gimpy (Peter Lorre) convinces company people that he loves aviation and joins the group. He is really Baron Rudolph Maximilian Tagger, the head of a foreign spy ring (implied to be Nazi Germany, then in real life undertaking a massive secret aerial rearmament build-up to the future Second World War), who plans to steal plans for the company's new secret American "D.O.X." bomber plane design project.

Gimpy seeks out a disgruntled Ace Martin and offers him money to betray his employer. Ace uses Joe, his young protégé, to obtain the plans, telling him he had made the blueprints. The Baron's Operative #77 (J. Carrol Naish), secretly working for another spy organization, attempts to get the plans, offering Ace three times more money. The meeting between the two is watched by the Baron, forcing Ace to kill the spy and keep the plans to bargain directly with the Baron.

On the maiden flight of the "Wild Goose", Ace and Joe are flying to Berlin (an unusually long trip by air for that era) with the aircraft company president on board. When they are in the air, Colonel Gimpy reveals that he has stowed away to accompany them. A gas cap comes loose, jeopardizing the flight. Ace volunteers to climb out onto the wing and secure the gas cap.

At the U.S. War Department, officials tell Ruth that Joe has been unwittingly drawn into a spy operation. She radios the aircraft, now far off course further east over the Atlantic Ocean, convincing Joe to turn Ace in. Reacting angrily, he tries to shake Ace off the wing, but is restrained by the others. When Ace returns, a struggle over the controls leads to a burst of steam spraying over Ace's face, blinding him. The aircraft is forced to ditch in the ocean.

With death imminent, as water fills the cabin, Ace shoots the Baron and gives Joe the only life jacket, along with the experimental bomber plane blueprints, so that he will be rescued by a nearby steamer ship. The three doomed men left on board smoke a last cigarette as the "Wild Goose" sinks beneath the waves.

== Cast ==
- Peter Lorre as Colonel Gimpy (aka "The Chief", Baron Rudolph Maximilian Tagger)
- Brian Donlevy as Ace Martin
- Helen Wood as Ruth Franklin
- Ralph Morgan as John R. Fleming
- Thomas Beck as Joe Randall
- Kay Linaker as Mrs. Fleming
- Lester Matthews as Sidney Grant
- Earle Foxe as Operative #30
- J. Carrol Naish as Operative #77
- Gloria Roy as Operative #16
- Oscar Apfel as Alfred Knuxton
- Paul Stanton as Daniel D. Harrington
- Howard C. Hickman as Major White

== Production ==
Principal photography for Crack-Up took place from late September to late October 1936, primarily at the 20th Century Fox studios in Hollywood of Los Angeles, California. A newly developed Lockheed Model 10 Electra airplane from the Lockheed Aircraft Corporation manufacturing plant in nearby Burbank, California stood in for the experimental "Wild Goose" research aircraft portrayed in the 1936 film giving it a futuristic realism.

== Reception ==
In their March, 1937 edition, Modern Screen gave the film a one-star review and commented that it may appeal to "lovers of weird melodrama who aren’t too particular about plots and plausibility. Its main asset is a fine portrayal of Peter Lorre." It concluded with the assessment that, "It’s Peter Lorre’s picture; the rest of the players have little chance to demonstrate their wares."

Crack-Up was a low-budget B movie that was enhanced by the sinister presence of Lorre who "... plays his limited role with a refreshing sense of sardonic humor." Leonard Maltin's review opined, "Not-bad espionage tale, with Lorre highly amusing as a spy trying to secure plans for experimental airplane; Donlevy's the test pilot he tries to bribe." On the DVD release of Crack-Up, the reviewer for DVD Talk gave a positive recommendation: "A lot of Crack-Updoesn't make a lick of real-world sense, but in its own crazy way, the film is quite entertaining."

== See also ==
- Norman Cyril Jackson, who was awarded the Victoria Cross for a real-life incident of climbing out on the wing of an Avro Lancaster bomber of the British Royal Air Force to try to put out a fire during a Second World War bombing mission over occupied-France and Nazi Germany.
