= Everybody's Old Man =

1936 film by James Flood

- Theatrical release poster
- Directed by: James Flood
- Screenplay by: Patterson McNutt; A.E. Thomas
- Based on: Adopted Father by Edgar Franklin
- Produced by: Bogart Rogers
- Starring: Irvin S. Cobb; Rochelle Hudson; Johnny Downs; Norman Foster
- Cinematography: Barney McGill
- Edited by: Lloyd Nosler
- Music by: David Buttolph; Cyril J. Mockridge
- Production company: 20th Century Fox
- Distributed by: 20th Century Fox
- Release date: March 20, 1936
- Running time: 82 minutes
- Country: United States
- Language: English

Everybody's Old Man is a 1936 American comedy film directed by James Flood and starring Irvin S. Cobb, Rochelle Hudson, Johnny Downs and Norman Foster. The film was produced and distributed by 20th Century Fox. It was originally conceived as a starring vehicle for Will Rogers, who died in a plane crash the previous year. The screenplay was based on the short story The Adopted Father by Edgar Franklin, previously adapted into the 1933 film The Working Man by Warner Brothers.

== Synopsis ==
When his old friend, turner business rival, dies the curmudgeonly canned food tycoon William Franklin agrees to his wife's suggestion that he retire and turn over the business to his cocky nephew Ronald and undertake a tour around the world. In Paris the homesick Franklin accompanies an American taxi driver to a nightclub where he discovers Cynthia and Tommy, the spoiled children of his former rival leading a dissolute life. Returning to America Franklin begins to investigate the affairs of the rival company. He discovers that the manager of the Chicago factory is deliberately sabotaging the company's affairs in order to buy up the business on the cheap. Franklin has himself appointed legal guardian to Cynthia and Tommy in an effort to reform them. Taking control of their company, it is soon outperforming the Franklin's own business led by Ronald. Ultimately matters are settled by a love affair between Cynthia and Ronald and a merger of the two concerns.

== Cast ==
- Irvin S. Cobb as William Franklin
- Rochelle Hudson as Cynthia Sampson
- Johnny Downs as Tommy Sampson
- Norman Foster as Ronald Franklin
- Alan Dinehart as Frederick Gillespie
- Sara Haden as Susan Franklin
- Donald Meek as Finney
- Warren Hymer as Mike Murphy
- Maurice Cass as Dr. Phillips
- Charles Coleman as Mansfield
- Ramsay Hill as Earl of Spearford
- John Miltern as Larson
- Walter Walker as Haslett
- Frederick Burton as Aylesworth
- Hal K. Dawson as Jameson
- Delma Byron as Miss Martin
- Hilda Vaughn as Maid

== Bibliography ==
- Lawson, Anita. Irvin S. Cobb. Popular Press, 1984.
