= Samuel G. Engel =

American film producer (1904–1984)

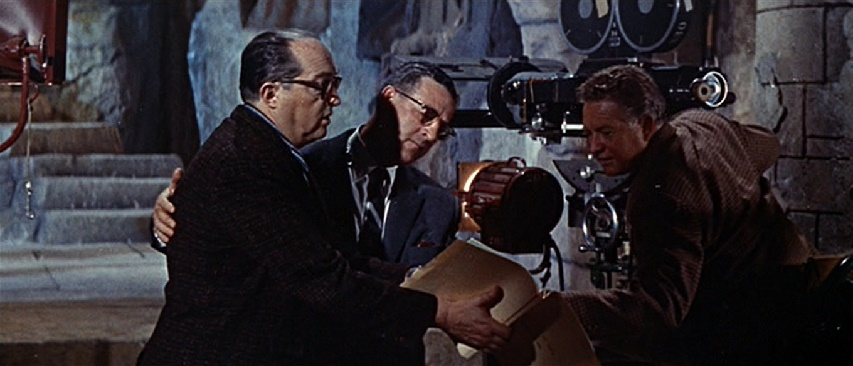
- Engel (center) with director Henry Koster and cinematographer Arthur Arling on the set of The Story of Ruth (1960)
- Born: Samuel Gamliel Engel; December 29, 1904; Woodridge, New York
- Died: April 7, 1984 (aged 79); Santa Cruz, California
- Education: Albany College of Pharmacy
- Occupations: Screenwriter, film producer and assistant director
- Relatives: Irving Engel

Samuel Gamliel Engel (December 29, 1904 – April 7, 1984) was a screenwriter and film producer from the 1930s until the 1960s. He wrote and produced My Darling Clementine (1946), Sitting Pretty (1948), The Frogmen (1951), Night and the City (1950), and Daddy Long Legs (1955).

== Biography ==
Born in Woodridge, New York (then Centreville), Samuel G.Engel gained a degree in pharmacology from the Albany College of Pharmacy in 1924. He owned a chain of drug stores in Manhattan with his brother Irving, before moving to Los Angeles in 1930.

Engel signed on as an assistant director at Warner Bros. in 1933, and joined the script department in 1931. In 1936, he was hired to be a producer at 20th Century Fox.

After serving with the OSS and US Navy in World War II, he continued as a film producer with 20th Century Fox until 1962, and continued as an independent producer until 1966.

Engel was president of the Screen Producers Guild from 1955 to 1958, and was instrumental in promoting its merger with the analogous guild of television producers to form the Producers Guild of America, and started the televising of the Academy Awards ceremonies as first vice-president of the Academy of Motion Picture Arts and Sciences.

Samuel G.Engel contributed to the creation of the theater arts department in UCLA.

== Personal life ==
Samuel G. Engel had a wife, Ruth, and two sons, Mark and Charles. He had a heart condition for many years before dying in 1984.

== Other roles ==
- Fellow of Brandeis University
- President of the Brandeis Institute

== Selected filmography ==
=== Screenwriter ===
- The Big Shakedown (1934)
- Sins of Man (1936)
- Crack-Up (1936)
- We're Going to Be Rich (1938)
- Johnny Apollo (1940)
- Earthbound (1940)
- Scotland Yard (1941)
- Private Nurse (1941)
- My Darling Clementine (1946)

=== Producer (or co-producer) ===
- Crack-Up (1936)
- My Darling Clementine (1946)
- Sitting Pretty (1948)
- The Street With No Name (1948)
- Mr. Belvedere Goes to College (1949)
- Come to the Stable (1949)
- Night and the City (1950)
- The Jackpot (1950)
- Rawhide (1951)
- Follow the Sun (1951)
- Belles on Their Toes (1952)
- Pony Soldier (1952)
- Daddy Long Legs (1955)
- Good Morning, Miss Dove (1955)
- A Man Called Peter (1955)
- Boy on a Dolphin (1957)
- The Story of Ruth (1960)
- The Lion (1962)
