= Curly Top =

- Theatrical release poster
- Directed by: Irving Cummings
- Screenplay by: Patterson McNutt; Arthur J. Beckhard
- Based on: Daddy-Long-Legs a 1912 novel by Jean Webster (uncredited)
- Produced by: Winfield Sheehan
- Starring: Shirley Temple; John Boles; Rochelle Hudson
- Cinematography: John F. Seitz
- Edited by: Jack Murray
- Music by: Ray Henderson; R.H. Bassett (uncredited); Hugo Friedhofer (uncredited); Arthur Lange (uncredited)
- Production company: Fox Film Corporation
- Distributed by: Fox Film Corporation
- Release date: July 26, 1935
- Running time: 75 minutes
- Country: United States
- Language: English

Curly Top is a 1935 American musical romantic comedy film directed by Irving Cummings and starring Shirley Temple, John Boles, and Rochelle Hudson.

== Plot ==
Elizabeth "Curly Top" Blair and her much-older sister Mary, whose late parents were stage performers, now live at Lakeside Orphanage for Girls with their pets, Spunky the Pony and Betsy the Duck. Being too old to be adopted, Mary cooks and cleans for her keep. The orphanage is run by the overly-strict superintendent Mrs. Higgins, under the direction of the ill-tempered senior trustee Mr. Wycoff, who insists upon rigid discipline and no play.

One rainy night, Elizabeth sneaks a soaking wet Spunky into the dormitory. Though sympathetic, the orphanage matron Henrietta Denham is forced to report the incident to Mrs. Higgins the next morning. As Elizabeth has already gotten in trouble for several instances of "unauthorized singing and dancing", Mrs. Higgins announces her intention to discipline Elizabeth by selling both Spunky and Betsy.

The same day, all of the trustees arrive to inspect the orphanage, including young lawyer Edward Morgan, who has recently inherited his position as trustee—and considerable wealth—from his late father. Morgan witnesses Elizabeth, accompanied by Mary on the piano, singing "Animal Crackers in My Soup" in the dining hall. Mr. Wycoff berates both Mrs. Higgins and Mary for allowing this "disorderly conduct", but Mary stands up to him. Morgan is impressed by the sisters' spunk and talent.

After witnessing Elizabeth doing an unflattering impression of him, Mr. Wycoff insists Elizabeth be sent to a public institution. Morgan immediately threatens to pull his funding, so Wycoff relents. After a conversation with Elizabeth, who quickly charms him, Morgan tells Mrs. Denham he will adopt the girl, on the condition that she be told he was hired to take care of her by the fictitious wealthy benefactor "Hiram Jones". His reason for the deception is that he has seen how the children at the orphanage are constantly forced to express gratitude for the most trivial things, and he does not want Elizabeth to feel she owes him anything. However, when the subject is broached with the Blair sisters, Elizabeth is hesitant to leave Mary, and Mary reveals she made a deathbed promise to her parents to never abandon Elizabeth.

Thinking the situation over at home, Morgan decides to go through with his plan, and he invites both of the Blair sisters to the summer home of "Mr. Jones" (really his own). There, Elizabeth quickly wins over the stuffy butler Reynolds, and Morgan's Aunt Genevieve. Morgan also allows Betsy and Spunky to move in, buying a cart so Spunky can pull the sisters around. The newly augmented family spends a wonderful summer together, capped by a benefit concert the sisters put on to buy playthings for the girls at the orphanage, as Mr. Wycoff had earlier refused to allow money to be spent on a playground.

Morgan begins to fall in love with Mary, but before he can propose to her, she is proposed to by pilot Jimmie Rogers, one of several young men and women she has been spending time with on the beach. Mistakenly believing Morgan is not interested in her, Mary accepts. Elizabeth, not wanting to move in with Jimmie and accidentally confusing the concepts of adoption and marriage, asks Morgan to marry her and Mary. Mary is mortified when she finds out, but admits she has broken her engagement, as she realized she did not really love Jimmie. She and Morgan become engaged, and he confesses there is no "Mr. Jones", as he has been the sisters' benefactor.

== Cast ==
- Shirley Temple as Elizabeth Blair, a young orphan
- John Boles as Edward Morgan, a wealthy lawyer and amateur songwriter
- Rochelle Hudson as Mary Blair, Elizbeth's elder sister
- Jane Darwell as Mrs. Henrietta Denham of Lakeside Orphanage
- Rafaela Ottiano as Mrs. Higgins, superintendent of Lakeside Orphanage
- Esther Dale as Genevieve Graham, Morgan's aunt
- Etienne Girardot as Mr. Wyckoff, a trustee of the orphanage
- Arthur Treacher as Reynolds, Morgan's butler
- Maurice Murphy as Jimmie Rogers, a young pilot
- Billy Gilbert as Morgan's cook (uncredited)
- Lynn Bari as one of Mary's friends on the beach (uncredited)

== Reception ==
Helen Brown Norden wrote in Vanity Fair that Temple "has great charm and a phenomenal ease which permit her to dominate even such an absurd situation and stupid dialogue as are forced on her in her latest picture, Curly Top." Maclean's critic Ann Ross was of the opinion that "Admirers of the screen's first child wonder will dote on Curly Top. People who find that all child performances on the screen, even Temple performances, stir up the wicked old Herod in them, had better stay away."

== Songs ==
- "Animal Crackers in My Soup" sung by Shirley Temple
- "It's All So New to Me" sung by John Boles
- "The Simple Things in Life" sung by Rochelle Hudson
- "When I Grow Up" sung by Shirley Temple
- "Curly Top" sung by John Boles
