= Otto Dyar =

American cinematographer (1892–1988)

- Born: July 25, 1892; Jacksonville, Oregon
- Died: December 26, 1988; Honolulu, Hawaii
- Occupation: Cinematographer
- Employers: Universal Film Manufacturing Company (1922); Paramount Famous Lasky Corporation (1927–1933); Fox Film Corporation (1935); Gaumont-British Picture Corporation (1935); Metro-Goldwyn-Mayer (1950–1953)

- self-portrait, while photographing Anna Mae Wong

Otto Dyar was an American cinematographer and stills photographer. He was the cinematographer for Human Hearts (1922), and later, a publicity and still photographer for Paramount (1927), Fox Film Corporation (1935), and Metro-Goldwyn-Mayer (1950–1953).

== Life ==
Otto Dyar was born July 25, 1892 in Jacksonville, Oregon and died December 26, 1988 in Honolulu, Hawaii.

"... Otto Dyar , who worked with me the first year. After the series was completed, Otto wanted to continue the arrangement so we rented half a small studio on Sunset Boulevard . I was still at Paramount so I could only work at night ..."—— John Engstead

== Career ==
Otto Dyar, was a Universal Film Manufacturing Company cinematographer for Human Hearts (1922), later, a Paramount Famous Lasky Corporation publicity and still photographer (1927), then for Gaumont-British Picture Corporation (1935), and Metro-Goldwyn-Mayer (1950–1953).

Otto Dyar, who started as a still photographer, soon turned to portrait work and eventually became one of Paramount's major photographers. He left his job at Paramount in 1933, partly because of a camera operator's strike, but went on ...

In 1927, John Engstead pleased his boss by arranging a photography session for actress Clara Bow with Dyar, using an outdoor setting, which was unusual at that time.

His dramatic glamour portraits had contrasty lighting, heavy diffusion, and a unique use of an arc light, not an incandescent, as his key light. At Paramount he photographed Clara Bow at the outset of her rise to stardom, Louise Brooks in her famous bob, and Marlene Dietrich for Shanghai Express. At the Fox Film Corporation, he shot Clara Bow’s portraits for Hoop-La, her final film. He later worked as a unit still photographer at M-G-M.

Dyar photographed unit, publicity and fashion layouts for Claudette Colbert, Clark Gable, Carole Lombard, Shirley Temple, William Powell, Elizabeth Taylor, Anna May Wong, Kay Francis, Madeleine Carroll, Nancy Carroll, Alice Faye, Clara Bow, Loretta Young, Mitzi Green, Gloria Swanson, Cary Grant, Tallulah Bankhead, Louise Brooks, Gary Cooper, and Fay Wray.

Dyar photographed William Boyd, Jackie Coogan, Paul Lukas, Richard "Skeets" Gallagher, Dorothy Hall and Claire Trevor.

Dyar photographed René Ray (Irene Lilian Creese) (later Countess of Midleton), Sessue Hayakawa, Will James Maurice Chevalier, Warner Baxter, Anna Mae Wong, Enid Stamp-Taylor, Lilian Harvey, Carole Lombard, Palm Springs Tennis Club, Elizabeth Taylor, Cary Grant,

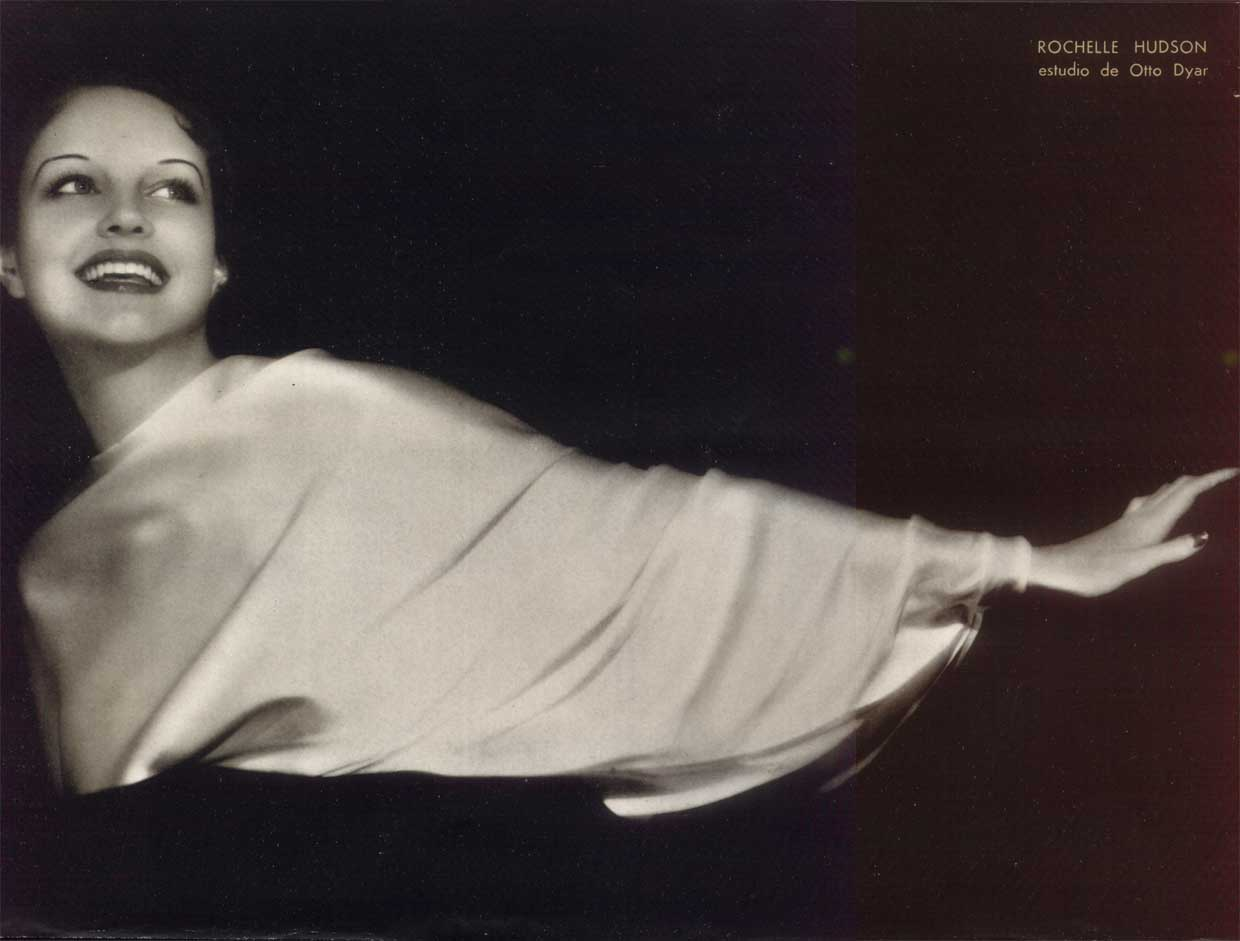

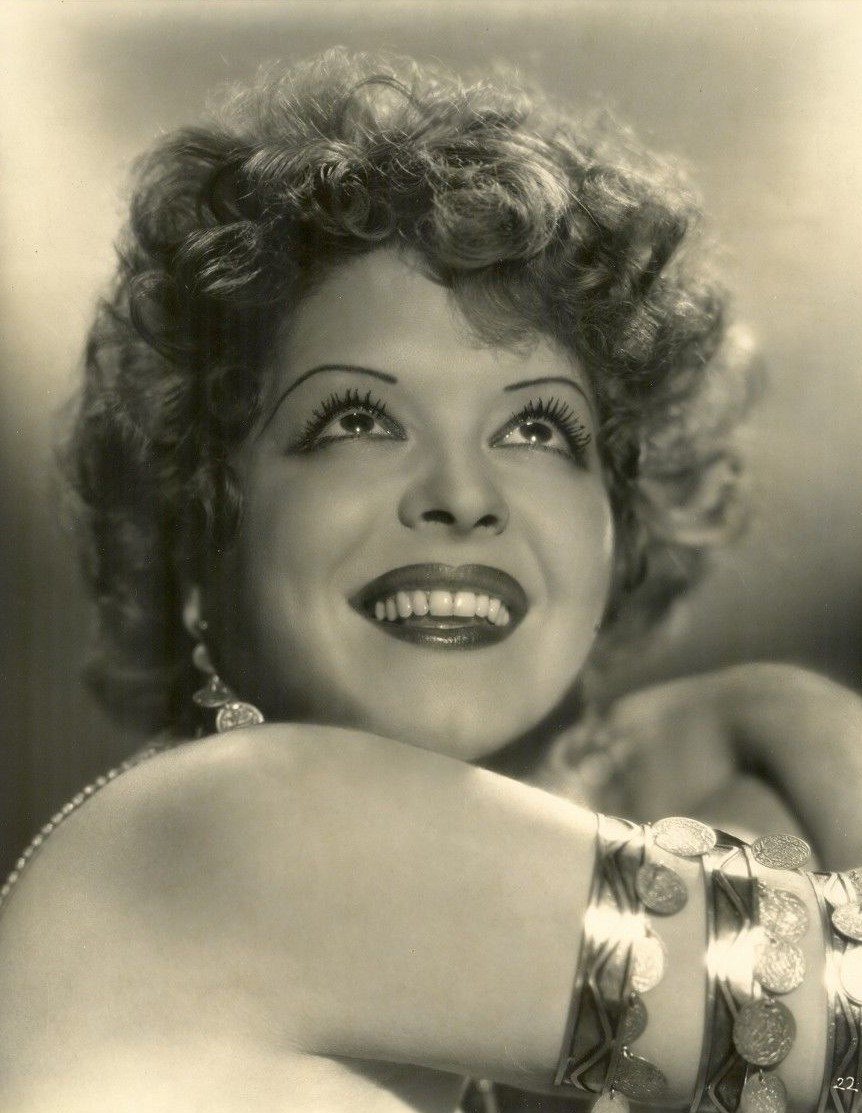

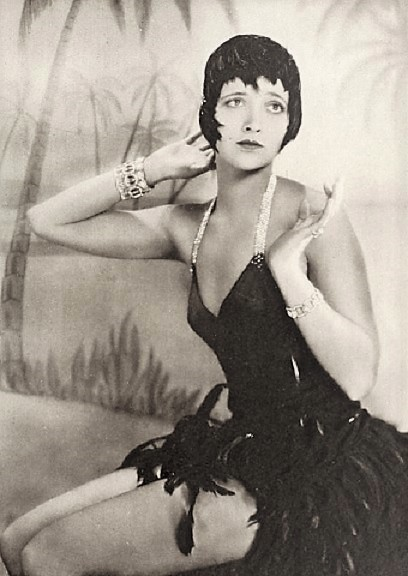

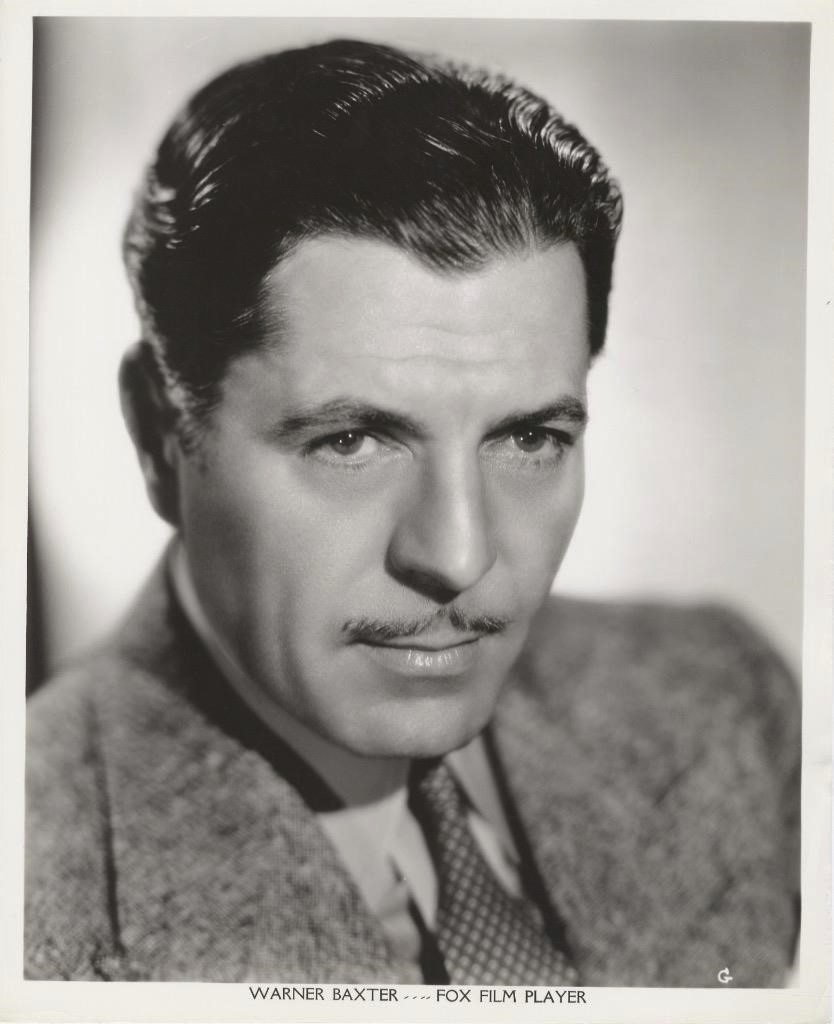

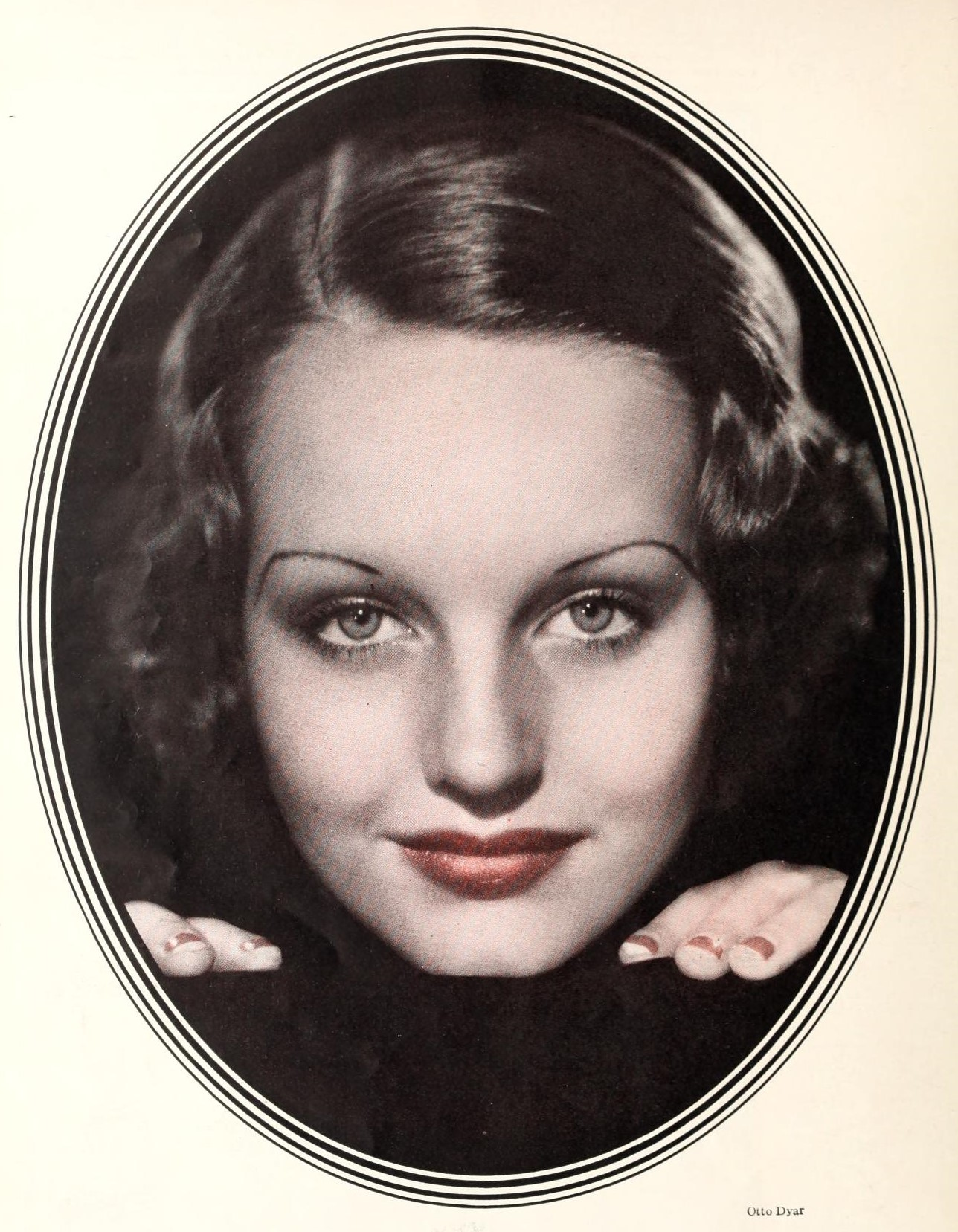

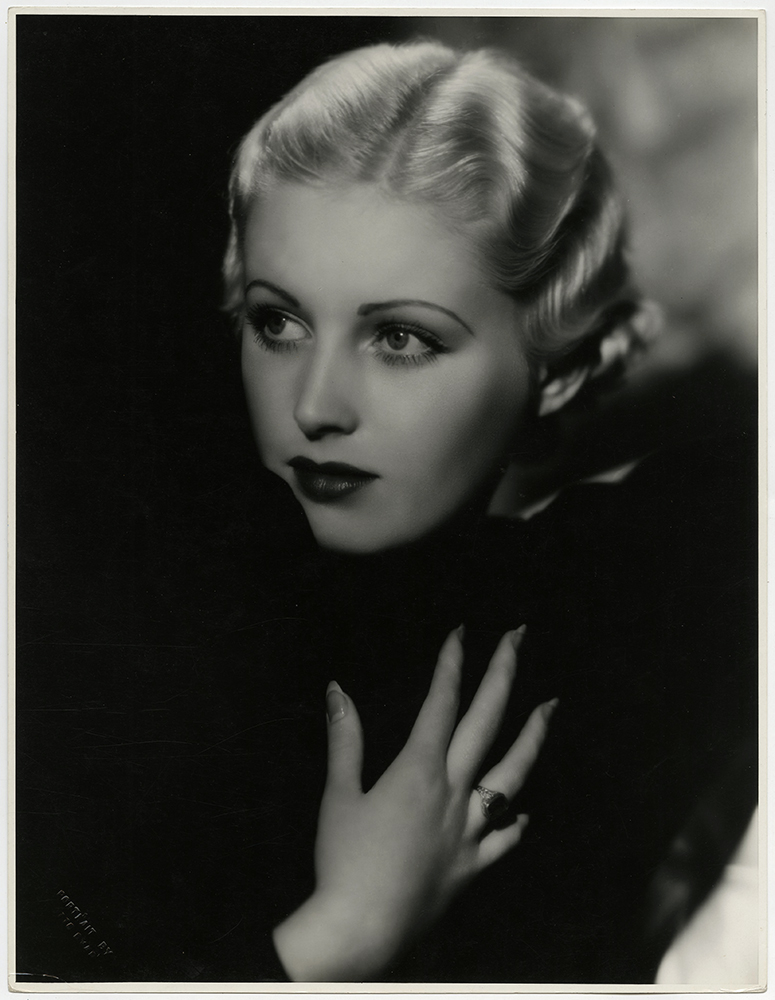

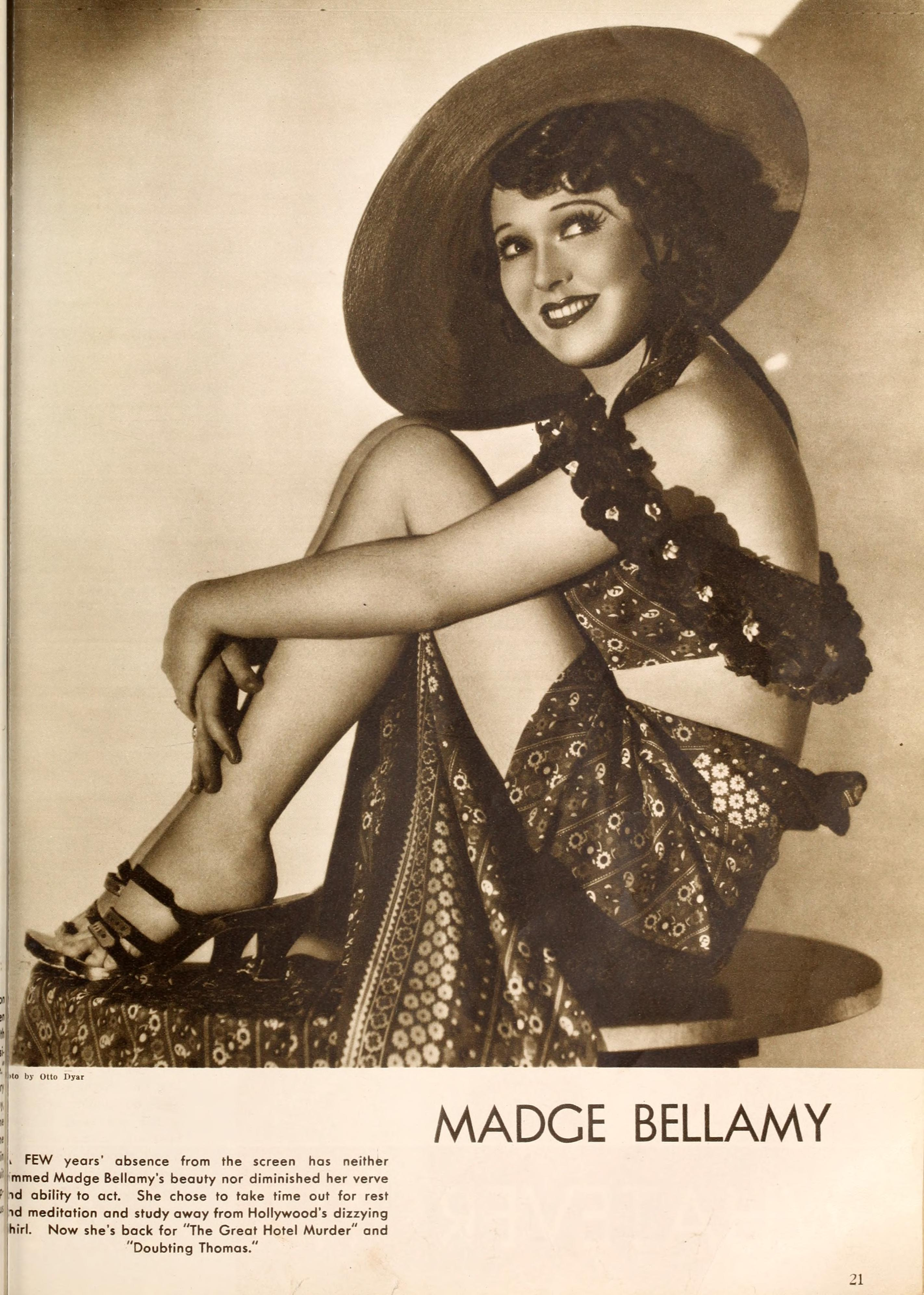

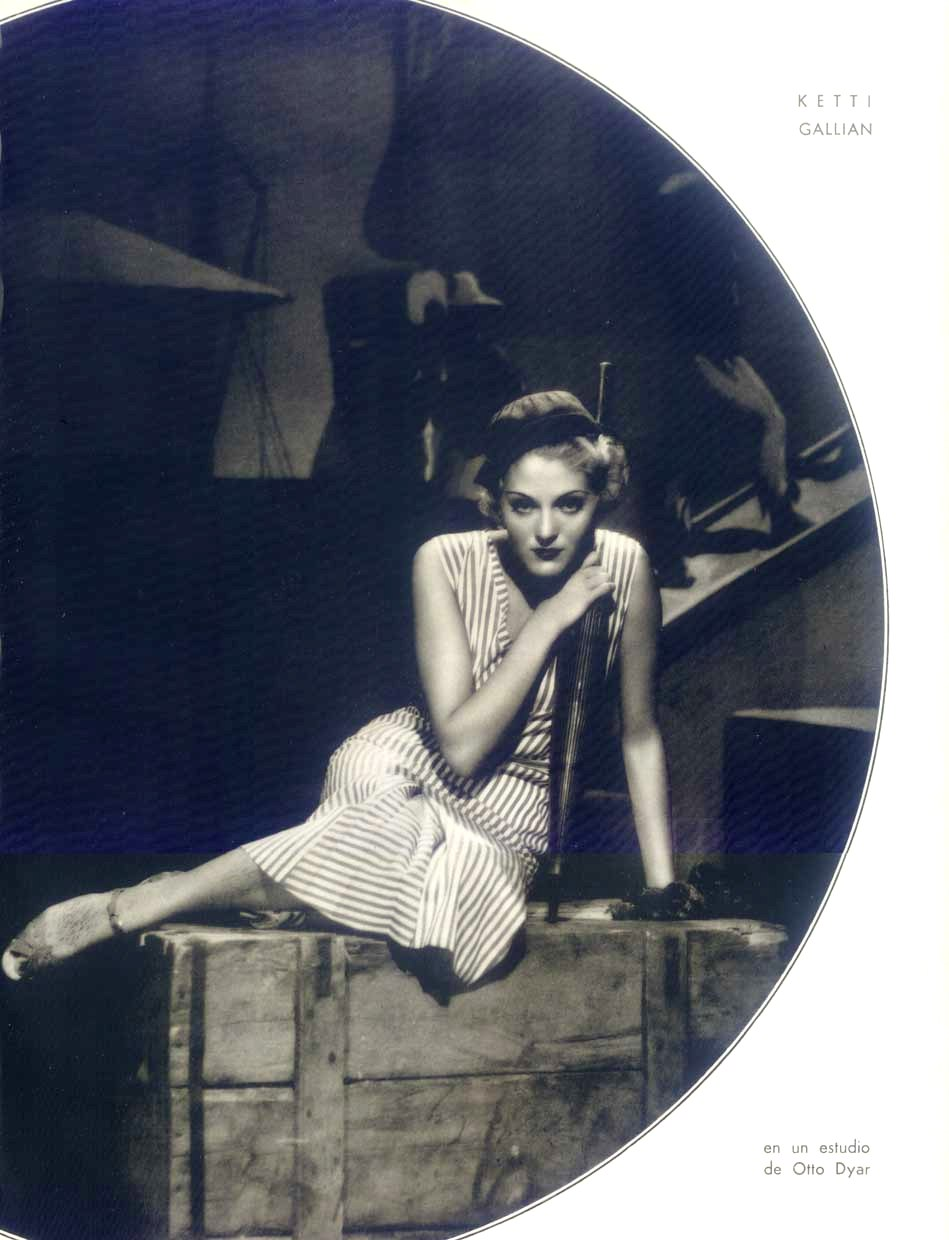

His work can be found at the J. Paul Getty Museum, Metropolitan Museum of Art, National Portrait Gallery, London, and other art museums.

Hollywood stills photographers like Dyar "were not mirroring life, but illusion; their subjects were not humans but gods – of love, of allure, of luxury, perfection incarnate from the golden age of Hollywood glamor" — John Kobal

"An interesting new kind of photography, done as easily with the two dollar camera in your own home as with the two hundred dollar instruments in the studio has been devised by Otto Dyar, clever young photographer of Hollywood." - Science and Invention, January 1930

Michael Balcon imported Otto Dyar (who had done so much to promote Clara Bow) from America to craft the image of his protégé Jessie Matthews for transatlantic audiences.

... Otto Dyar to sell First a Girl in 1935 , to see the immense difference made by an infusion of Hollywood knowhow . From that point on it is easy to imagine that she would be seriously touted as Ginger Rogers's successor in the arms of ...

… Willis of the Labor Department in a decision enjoining the International Photographers of the Motion Picture Industries from interfering with the right of plaintiff, Otto Dyar, "to apply for, …

International Photographers of the Motion Picture Industries had expelled Otto Dyar, a "still" camera man, legally and denied his plea for damages

"... Otto Dyar, whose fascination with the overhead lighting methods used in advertising photography gave him a distinctively different approach to imagery, found himself copping the stage-frame idea for several publicity campaigns. "
