= Thomas Beck (actor) =

American actor (1909–1995)

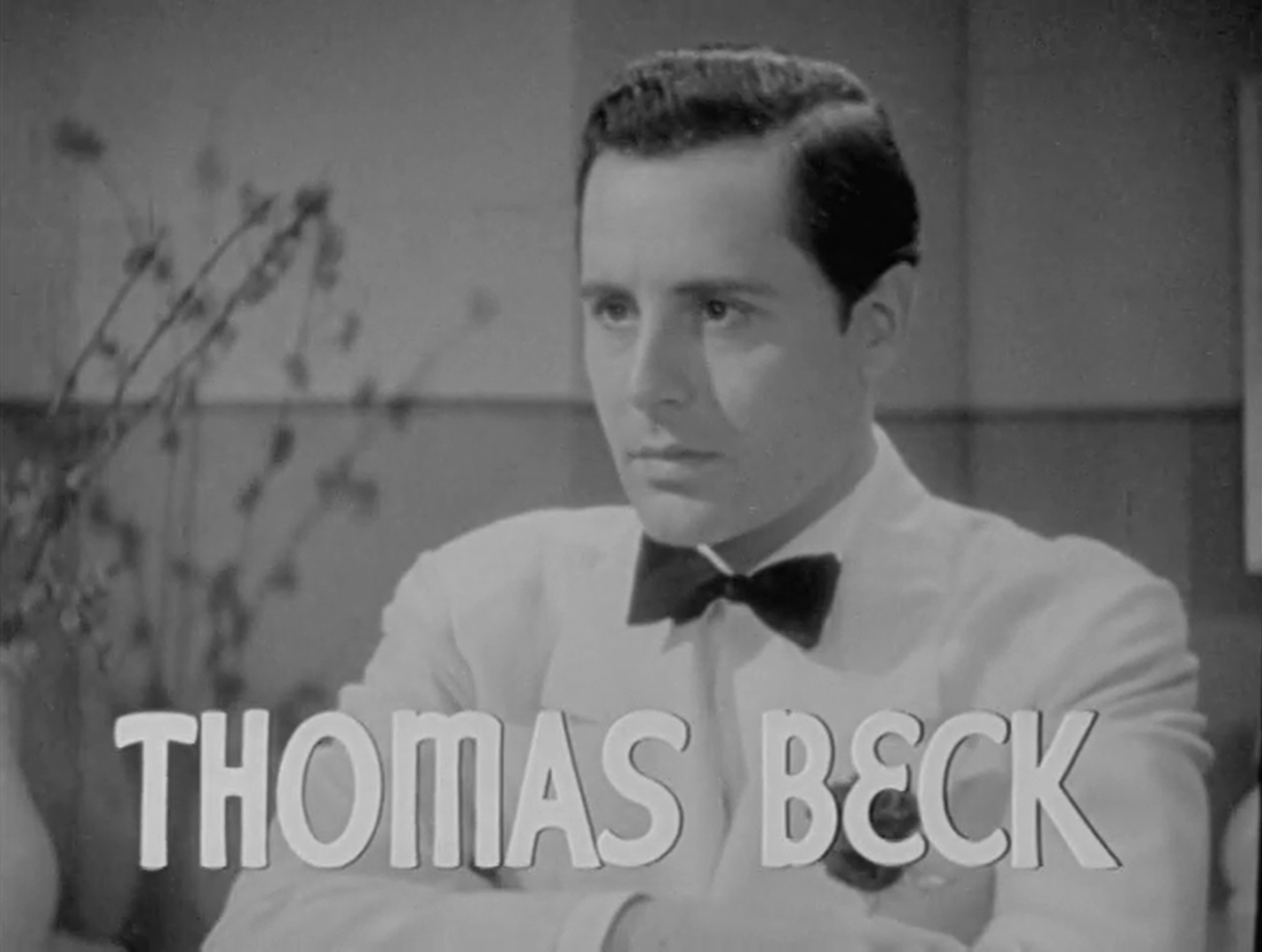
- Trailer for Think Fast, Mr. Moto (1937)
- Born: December 29, 1909; New York City, U.S.
- Died: September 23, 1995 (aged 85); Miami Shores, Florida, U.S.
- Resting place: Loudon Park Cemetery, Baltimore, Maryland
- Occupation: Actor
- Years active: 1934–1988

Thomas Beck (December 29, 1909 – September 23, 1995) was an American film and stage actor during the mid to late 1930s, who first attracted attention playing juvenile leads in several Charlie Chan and Mr. Moto films.

== Early life ==
Born in New York City, on December 29, 1909, Beck entered college with the intention of becoming a doctor but abandoned that career path for engineering.

Beck attended Johns Hopkins University, where his courses included Reserve Officers' Training Corps.

== Career ==
His first professional work was in a stock company and he later played on Broadway. His work interested film executives, who sent him to Hollywood. Beck featured in 28 films in his career, with notable roles in several Charlie Chan films: Charlie Chan in Paris (1935), Charlie Chan in Egypt (1935), Charlie Chan at the Race Track (1936), and Charlie Chan at the Opera (1936). He also worked opposite Will Rogers in Life Begins at 40 (1935), in which he played the spoiled son of a landowner; appeared as a French legionnaire in Under Two Flags (1936), played Pastor Schultz, the village priest, in Shirley Temple's 1937 film Heidi; and appeared opposite Temple's counterpart Jane Withers in Can This Be Dixie? (1936). He was seen to good advantage in two 1936 Fox motion pictures, in which he had leading roles: as a pilot in Peter Lorre's first American film, the espionage thriller Crack-Up and as a rich socialite in Champagne Charlie.

He also worked to promote the Screen Actors Guild to improve working conditions for actors, and when his career seemed ready to take off he suddenly left movie work in 1939 after the studio tried to reduce his wages. He then served in the Army, serving in the Pacific Theater during World War II, finishing as a major in 1945. He briefly returned to the theatre in 1946, appearing with Blanche Yurka in Temper the Wind, in New York City.

Beck joined the Army as a private in 1940. He was with the 608th Tank Destroyer Battalion until he graduated from Infantry Officer Candidate School at Fort Benning, Georgia. After graduation he became a lieutenant, Special Service Officer with the 98th Infantry Division at Camp Breckinridge, Kentucky.

== Death ==
Beck died on September 23, 1995, aged 85, in Miami Shores, Florida, after battling Alzheimer's disease and heart conditions.
