= Caribbean Mystery =

Caribbean Mystery may refer to:

- The Caribbean Mystery, 1945 American film based on 1933 novel Murder in Trinidad
- A Caribbean Mystery, 1964 Miss Marple British novel by Agatha Christie
- A Caribbean Mystery, 1983 American telefilm with Helen Hayes as Miss Marple
- A Caribbean Mystery, 1989 British telefilm with Joan Hickson as Miss Marple
- A Caribbean Mystery, 2013 episode of British TV series Agatha Christie's Marple with Julia McKenzie
