= Mr. Moto in Danger Island =

1939 film by Herbert I. Leeds

- Theatrical release poster
- Directed by: Herbert I. Leeds
- Written by: Peter Milne; John Reinhardt; George Bricker; Jack Jungmeyer; Edith Skouras
- Based on: Murder in Trinidad by John W. Vandercook characters by John P. Marquand
- Produced by: John Stone
- Starring: Peter Lorre; Jean Hersholt; Amanda Duff; Warren Hymer
- Cinematography: Lucien N. Andriot
- Edited by: Harry Reynolds
- Music by: Samuel Kaylin
- Production company: 20th Century Fox
- Distributed by: 20th Century Fox
- Release date: April 7, 1939
- Running time: 70 minutes
- Country: United States
- Language: English

Mr. Moto in Danger Island is a 1939 American mystery film directed by Herbert I. Leeds and starring Peter Lorre, Jean Hersholt and Amanda Duff. It is part of the Mr. Moto series of films.

The film was based on the 1933 novel Murder in Trinidad, but the setting was moved to Puerto Rico.

== Plot ==
Mr. Moto arrives in Puerto Rico to investigate the murder of an American agent, Graham, and uncovers a murderous smuggling ring. On the ship taking him to San Juan, he unwillingly acquires the services of a dim-witted, but good-hearted professional wrestler Twister McGurk after he teaches him jujutsu. Also travelling with Mr. Moto is Joan Castle, the daughter of the police commissioner Colonel Thomas Castle. Upon landing in San Juan, Mr. Moto is apparently ill with appendicitis. The ambulance that is to take him to the hospital is hijacked by the smugglers led by Captain Dahlen who plan to execute him, but McGurk arrives in time to save him. Mr. Moto was not ill as he claimed, and uses his jujutsu skills to defeat the would-be-assassins. Mr. Moto claimed to need an appendicitis operation in order to find out who is the leader of the smuggling ring. As only a few people around John Bentley, the governor of Puerto Rico, knew that he had reported that he needed an appendicitis operation, he deduces that one of them must the leader of the smuggling ring. Despite being old friends, there is much tension between Bentley and Colonel Castle over the latter's inability to solve the Graham murder case or to discover who the diamond smugglers are.

Upon learning that Graham had taken out several books from the library concerning a Blackbeard-like pirate known as Black Tyrant and his rumored hiding place in a nearby swamp, Mr. Moto decides that the diamond smugglers must be using the same swamp. Present at the library is the wealthy shipper and friend of the governor, Mr. Sutter. Moto and McGurk are fired upon when they visit the swamp. Upon Moto's return to San Juan, a hotel valet is killed when he tries to fill up Moto's bathtub, which has been rigged to electrocute whoever uses it. Evidence emerges that Colonel Castle is involved in the smuggling ring while Joan Castle overhears someone at the party talking on the phone to Captain Dahlen. Later at the same party, Bentley is murdered and Colonel Caste is found at the crime scene. The police commissioner, Gordon, accuses Colonel Castle of being the murderer, but Moto persuades Gordon to allow Castle to return home. The next day, Gordon, Moto and McGurk go to Castle's home and find that he and his daughter have disappeared. Moto says that the Castles have been kidnapped while Gordon believes they have fled, and orders Castle's arrest. A cable arrives saying that Mr. Moto is really the master criminal Shimura and the real Mr. Moto is in New York. Gordon then orders the arrest of Mr. Moto and McGurk, accusing them of being the murderers, but Moto's jujutsu skills allows him and McGurk to escape. After hiding from the police, Mr. Moto tells McGurk that he sent the cable himself in order to infiltrate the smuggling gang who have kidnapped Joan Castle.

After infiltrating the gang in their camp in the swamp, Mr. Moto finds the Castles have indeed been kidnapped. Moto is exposed as a double agent when Dahlen arrives at the camp, but he is able to escape with McGurk. Moto contacts Gordon and reveals his ruse. Moto leads the police on a raid and they pursue Captain Dahlen fleeing with Joan Castle on his boat. Despite Mr. Moto's orders to take Dahlen alive, Mr. Sutter shoots Dahlen. Moto has Dahlan taken to the hospital and announces that based on what the doctors have told him, Dahlen will reveal who his boss is at 8 pm. Just before 8 pm, Dahlen is stabbed. Moto reveals that Colonel Castle has been framed and the leader of the gang is Mr. Sutter who is caught throwing the knife into Dahlen. Moto states that Dahlen was not wounded, but killed by Sutter earlier that day, and he maintained the deception of Dahlan still being alive to force Sutter to reveal himself. With Sutter arrested, Joan declares her love for George Bentley, the governor's son, while McGurk thanks Moto for teaching him jujutsu. Moto tactfully tells McGurk his services will not be needed on his next case and demonstrates that McGurk still has much to learn about jujutsu.

== Main cast ==
- Peter Lorre as Mr. Moto
- Jean Hersholt as Sutter
- Amanda Duff as Joan Castle
- Warren Hymer as Twister McGurk
- Richard Lane as Commissioner Gordon
- Leon Ames as Commissioner Madero
- Douglass Dumbrille as La Costa
- Charles D. Brown as Col. Thomas Castle
- Paul Harvey as Gov. John Bentley
- Robert Lowery as Lt. George Bentley
- Eddie Marr as Capt. Dahlen
- Harry Woods as Grant
- Ray Walker as Ambulance Intern
- Ward Bond as Sailor Sam – Wrestler (uncredited)

== Production ==
The novel Murder in Trinidad had first been filmed in 1934 as starring Nigel Bruce.

It was originally going to be a Charlie Chan picture with a treatment written by John Reinhardt in 1938 called Chan in Trinidad. In September 1938, George Bricker wrote another treatment called Mr. Moto in Trinidad.

It was also known as Mr Moto in Trinidad, Mr Moto in Puerto Rico, and Mr Moto in Terror Island.

Filming started 25 November 1938 under the title, "Mr Moto in Puerto Rico". It was one of the few films not to be directed by Norman Foster' in this was Herbert Leeds did the job.

Antonio Moreno was originally to have played the role of "La Costa."

== Reception ==
The film came out in March 1939. The new York Times said the film has "some humour... a bit of action, but little suspense."

Fox later filmed the novel a third time, as The Caribbean Mystery (1945).

== End of series ==
In December 1938 Fox announced they would not give Lorre a new contract but that he still had four Moto films to make. However Lorre left the studio in July 1939, effectively ending the series.

== Home media ==
This film, along with Mr. Moto's Gamble, Mr. Moto's Last Warning, Mr. Moto Takes a Vacation and (as a DVD extra) The Return of Mr. Moto, was released on DVD in 2007 by 20th Century Fox as part of The Mr. Moto Collection, Volume Two.

== Bibliography ==
- Backer, Ron. Mystery Movie Series of 1930s Hollywood. McFarland, 2012.
