= Thank You, Mr. Moto =

Thank You, Mr. Moto may refer to:

- Thank You, Mr. Moto (novel), a 1936 spy novel by John P. Marquand
- Thank You, Mr. Moto (film), a 1937 film adaptation
