= Elizabeth Curzon Hoxie House =

- Interactive map of the Elizabeth Curzon Hoxie House area

General information
- Architectural style: Vernacular Victorian
- Location: Newburyport, Massachusetts, United States, 78 Curzon Mill Road
- Coordinates: 42°49′12″N 70°56′10″W
- Construction started: 1859
- Owner: 1859 – unknown Elizabeth Curzon Hoxie

Technical details
- Floor count: 3

Elizabeth Curzon Hoxie House is a historic home located in Newburyport, Massachusetts, United States. It was built in 1859 for Elizabeth Curzon Hoxie (1822–1898), a great-aunt of novelist John P. Marquand, and is a two-story Vernacular Victorian-style brick dwelling.

There is a wooden addition at the rear of the home whose date is unknown.

Elizabeth Curzon Hoxie was a housekeeper. Her husband was John Anson Hoxie.
