= The Late George Apley =

1937 novel by John Phillips Marquand

The novel's first edition, published in 1937 by Little, Brown and Company

The Late George Apley is a 1937 novel by John Phillips Marquand. It is a satire of Boston's upper class in the late 19th and early 20th centuries. The title character is a Harvard University-educated WASP living on Beacon Hill in downtown Boston. The book is an epistolary novel, made up mostly of letters to and from the title character. It is subtitled "A Novel in the Form of a Memoir", because the letters and other personal documents are quoted by another character, Apley's biographer.

The book was acclaimed as the first "serious" work by Marquand, who had previously been known for his Mr. Moto spy novels and other popular fiction. It was a bestseller and won the Pulitzer Prize for the Novel in 1938. An article in The New Yorker decades later called the book the "best-wrought fictional monument to the nation's Protestant elite that we know of."

The narrative begins in the early 1930s. Wealthy Bostonian John Apley engages a somewhat pompous literary man to produce a truthful book about his recently deceased father, George. This writer, named Willing, specializes in flowery, sanitized tributes to local luminaries, and he is disturbed by the young man's request for frankness, especially since George Apley was his good friend, but he reluctantly agrees.

Willing moves chronologically through Apley's 66 years of life, using letters from his late subject's personal papers. He frequently interjects his own comments, declaring his admiration for Apley the public-spirited citizen and bemoaning the disclosure of "scandalous" information about the man and his family. Willing, a comic character in his own right, longs for the old days in Boston, when subjects such as love affairs, alcoholism, mental illness and crime were kept out of the papers if they involved prominent people, and respectability was more important than personal happiness.

The image of George Apley that emerges in the course of the novel is alternately hilarious and poignant, and ultimately sympathetic. Apley is revealed as a man who was deeply conflicted about his status among Boston's elite, sometimes feeling imprisoned in his privileged world, but sometimes passionately defending the old order.

In 1944, the novel was adapted as a Broadway play, and in 1947, it was made into a feature film starring Ronald Colman. In 1955, 20th Century Fox produced a TV series starring Raymond Massey and Joanne Woodward that ran until 1957.
