= Edith Skouras =

American screenwriter active 1938-1940

- Born: Edith Helen Skouras; June 6, 1911; Salt Lake City, Utah, USA
- Died: June 21, 2015 (aged 104); Santa Barbara, California, USA
- Education: Hosmer Hall
- Occupation: Screenwriter
- Spouse: Jack Jungmeyer Jr.
- Parent: Charles Skouras
- Relatives: George Skouras (uncle); Spyros Skouras (uncle)

Edith Skouras (June 6, 1911 – June 21, 2015) was an American screenwriter who primarily worked in Hollywood in the 1930s.

== Biography ==
Edith was born in Salt Lake City, Utah, to Charles Skouras and Florence Souders. The family spent time in Missouri, where Charles and his brothers built a theater business and Edith attended Hosmer Hall. After the extended family moved further west, her father eventually became head of Fox West Coast Theaters, which he ran with Edith's uncles. Edith married Jack Jungmeyer Jr., an assistant film producer at 20th Century Fox, in 1938. The pair often collaborated on projects together. She died in Santa Barbara, California, in 2015.

== Selected filmography ==
- Manhattan Heartbeat (1940)
- On Their Own (1940)
- High School (1940)
- Mr. Moto in Danger Island (1939)
- Always Goodbye (1938)
