= Paul Harvey (actor) =

American actor (1882–1955)

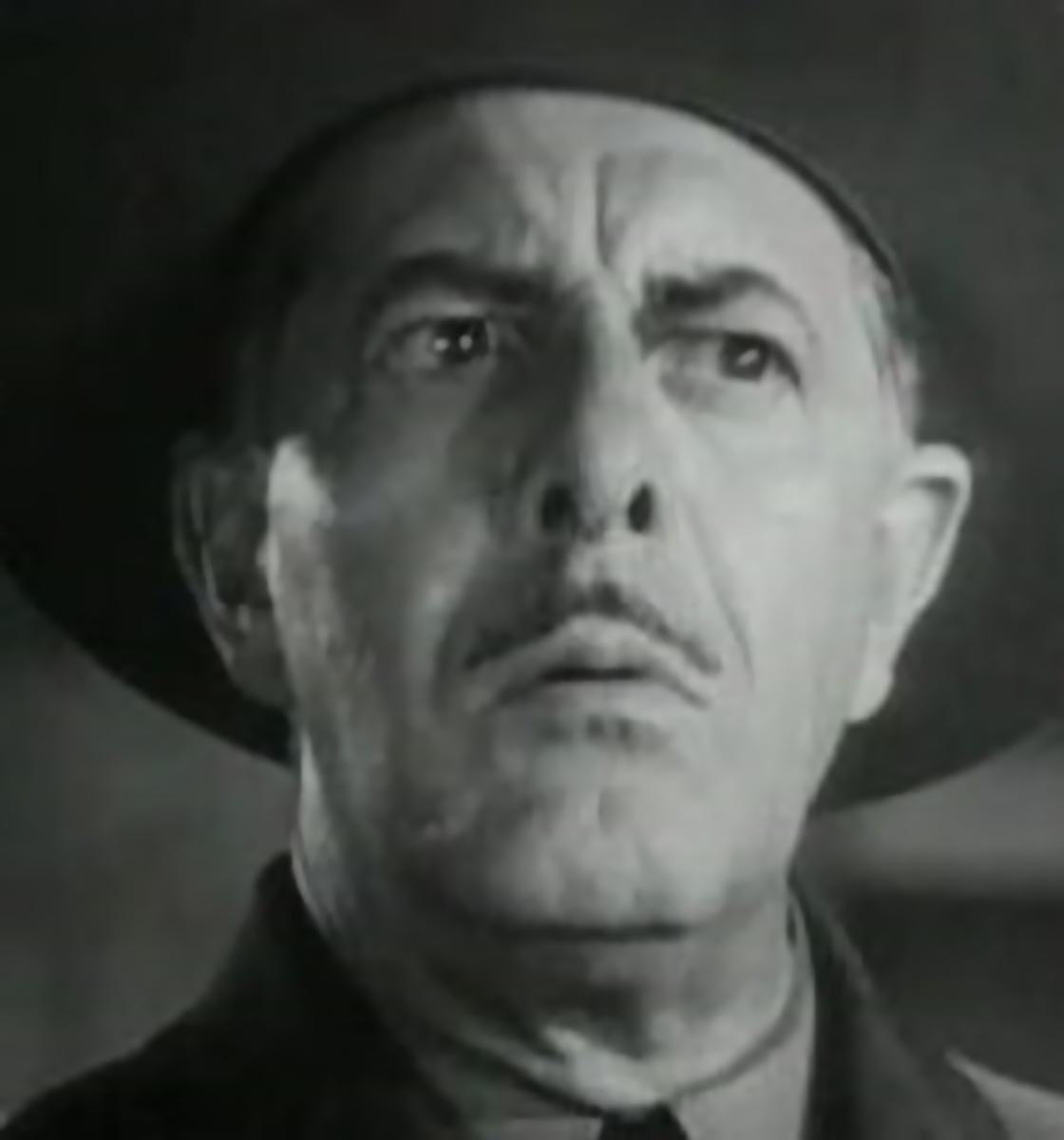
- Harvey in Yellowstone (1936)
- Born: Roy Paul Harvey; September 10, 1882; Sandwich, Illinois, U.S.
- Died: December 5, 1955 (aged 73); Los Angeles, California, U.S.
- Resting place: Forest Lawn Memorial Park, Glendale, California
- Occupation: Actor
- Years active: 1915–1955
- Spouse: Merle Stanton

Roy Paul Harvey (September 10, 1882 – December 5, 1955) was an American character actor who appeared in at least 177 films.

== Biography ==
Primarily a character actor, Harvey began his career on stage and in silent films. He appeared in the Broadway and original film versions of The Awful Truth, then had supporting roles in many Hollywood films, often portraying dignified executives or pompous authority figures.

He was a vacationing businessman whose car is commandeered by fugitive killer Humphrey Bogart in the 1936 crime drama The Petrified Forest and the minister who marries Spencer Tracy's daughter Elizabeth Taylor in the 1950 comedy Father of the Bride and baptizes her baby in its sequel. In the thriller Side Street, Harvey played a married man forced to pay $30,000 in blackmail money after having an affair, and was the pompous judge scandalized by Charles Coburn's senior antics in Has Anybody Seen My Gal.

Besides his numerous films, Harvey appeared in 1950s television series such as I Love Lucy, December Bride, My Little Margie, Father Knows Best and The George Burns and Gracie Allen Show before his death from a coronary thrombosis in 1955. He was buried in Forest Lawn Memorial Park, Glendale, California.

== Selected filmography ==
Year	Title	Roles	Notes
1915	The Pearl of the Antilles	Col. Henry Richmond	
1918	Men Who Have Made Love to Me	The Literary Man	
1929	The Awful Truth	Dan Leeson	
1932	The Wiser Sex	Blaney	
1933	Advice to the Lovelorn	Gaskell	
1934	The House of Rothschild	Solomon Rothschild	
1934	Looking for Trouble	James Regan	
1934	The Last Gentleman	One of Judd's Creditors	(uncredited)
1934	Born to Be Bad	Attorney Brian	
1934	Charlie Chan's Courage	J.P. Madden / Jerry Delaney	
1934	Hat, Coat, and Glove	The Prosecuting Attorney	
1934	Handy Andy	Charlie Norcross	
1934	She Was a Lady	Jeff Dyer	
1934	The Affairs of Cellini	Emissary	
1934	Kid Millions	Shiek Mulhulla	
1934	The President Vanishes	Skinner	
1934	Broadway Bill	James Whitehall	
1934	A Wicked Woman	Ed Trice	
1935	The Whole Town's Talking	'J.G.' Carpenter	
1935	I'll Love You Always	Sandstone	
1935	Four Hours to Kill!	Capt. Seaver	
1935	Goin' to Town	Donovan	
1935	Alibi Ike	Lefty Crawford	
1935	Broadway Melody of 1936	Scully	Managing Editor
1935	Thanks a Million	Maxwell	
1936	Rose of the Rancho	Boss Martin	
1936	The Petrified Forest	Mr. Chisholm	
1936	August Weekend	George Washburne	
1936	The Walking Dead	Blackstone	
1936	The Witness Chair	Prosecuting Attorney Martin	
1936	Private Number	Perry Winfield	
1936	The Return of Sophie Lang	Insp. Parr	
1936	Postal Inspector	Police Lt. Ordway	(uncredited)
1936	Yellowstone	Chief Ranger Radell	
1936	The General Died at Dawn	American Husband	(uncredited)
1936	Mad Holiday	Chief Gibbs	(uncredited)
1936	The Plainsman	Yellow Hand	
1936	Three Men on a Horse	Clarence Dobbins	
1936	Mind Your Own Business	Brannigan	
1937	Black Legion	Billings	
1937	23 1/2 Hours Leave	Gen. Markley	
1937	The Soldier and the Lady	Tsar	
1937	The Devil Is Driving	Sam Mitchell	
1937	On Again-Off Again	Mr. Applegate	
1937	Big City	District Attorney Gilbert	
1937	My Dear Miss Aldrich	Mr. Sinclair	
1937	High Flyers	Horace Arlington	
1938	Algiers	Janvier	
1938	A Slight Case of Murder	Mr. Whitewood	
1938	Love on a Budget	Emory Fisher	
1938	Rebecca of Sunnybrook Farm	Cyrus Bartlett	
1938	The Higgins Family	Ollie Thornwald	
1938	I'll Give a Million	Corcoran	
1938	If I Were King	Burgundian Herald	
1938	The Sisters	Caleb Ammon	
1938	There's That Woman Again	Stone	
1938	Charlie Chan in Honolulu	Inspector Rawlins	
1939	Mr. Moto in Danger Island	Gov. John Bentley	
1939	Never Say Die	Jasper Hawkins	
1939	The Gorilla	A.P. Conway	
1939	The Forgotten Woman	Charles Courtenay	
1939	News Is Made at Night	Inspector Melrose	
1939	They Shall Have Music	Heifetz' Manager	
1939	Stanley and Livingstone	Colonel Grimes	
1939	Meet Dr. Christian	John Hewitt	
1939	Two Thoroughbreds	Horse Owner	
1940	Brother Rat and a Baby	Sterling Randolph	
1940	High School	James Wallace	
1940	Dr. Ehrlich's Magic Bullet	Defense Attorney	(uncredited)
1940	The Marines Fly High	Col. Hill	
1940	Typhoon	Dea's father	
1940	Sailor's Lady	Captain	
1940	Maryland	Buckman	
1940	Manhattan Heartbeat	Dr. Bentley	
1940	Arizona	Solomon Warner	
1940	Behind the News	Dist. Atty. Hardin S. Kelly	
1941	High Sierra	Mr. Baughman	
1941	Ride on Vaquero	Colonel Warren	
1941	Out of the Fog	Judge Moriarty	
1941	Puddin' Head	Mr. Harvey	
1941	Law of the Tropics	Alfred King Sr	
1941	Great Guns	Gen. Taylor	
1941	You Belong to Me	Barrows	
1941	Three Girls About Town	Fred Chambers	
1941	Rise and Shine	Orville Turner	
1941	Mr. District Attorney in the Carter Case	Dist. Atty. Winton	
1941	You're in the Army Now	General Philpot	
1941	Remember the Day	Sen. Phillips	
1942	A Tragedy at Midnight	Landeck	
1942	Blondie's Blessed Event	William Lawrence	(uncredited)
1942	The Man Who Wouldn't Die	Dudley Wolff	
1942	Moonlight Masquerade	John Bennett Sr	
1942	You Can't Escape Forever	Maj. Turner	
1942	Heart of the Golden West	James Barrabee	
1943	Thank Your Lucky Stars	Dr. Kirby	(uncredited)
1943	The Man from Music Mountain	Arthur Davis	
1943	Mystery Broadcast	Arthur J. Stanley	
1944	Four Jills in a Jeep	General	(uncredited)
1944	Henry Aldrich Plays Cupid	Senator Tom Caldicott	
1944	Jamboree	P.J. Jarvis	
1944	In the Meantime, Darling	Maj. Gen. B.R. Garnett	(uncredited)
1944	Thoroughbreds	John Crandall	
1945	The Horn Blows at Midnight	Hotel Manager Thompson	
1945	Pillow to Post	J.R. Howard, Coast Oil Well Supply	(uncredited)
1945	The Chicago Kid	Carter	
1945	Midnight Manhunt	Mr. McAndrews	Night Editor (uncredited)
1945	The Southerner	Ruston	
1945	Mama Loves Papa	Mr. McIntosh	
1945	State Fair	Simpson	(uncredited)
1945	Swingin' on a Rainbow	Thomas Marsden	
1945	Don't Fence Me In	Gov. Thomas	
1945	Spellbound	Dr. Hanish	
1946	Up Goes Maisie	Mr. J.G. Nuboult	
1946	Gay Blades	J.M. Snively	
1946	Blondie's Lucky Day	Jonathan Butler Sr	
1946	They Made Me a Killer	District Attorney Booth	
1946	A Night in Casablanca	Mr. Smythe	
1946	Do You Love Me	Artemis Hilliard	(scenes deleted)
1946	In Fast Company	Patrick McCormick	
1946	Easy to Wed	Curtis Farwood	
1946	The Bamboo Blonde	Patrick Ransom Sr	
1946	Shadow of a Woman	Howard K. Brooks, Chief of Detectives	(uncredited)
1946	Heldorado	C.W. Driscoll	
1946	That Brennan Girl	Judge	(uncredited)
1947	The Beginning or the End	Lieut. General Wilhelm D. Styer	
1947	The Late George Apley	Julian H. Dole	(uncredited)
1947	Danger Street	Turlock	
1947	Out of the Blue	Mr. Holliston	
1947	High Barbaree	John Case	
1947	Living in a Big Way	Judge	(uncredited)
1947	Wyoming	Judge Sheridan	
1948	The Judge Steps Out	John Struthers II	(uncredited)
1948	Call Northside 777	Martin Burns	
1948	Lightnin' in the Forest	Judge Waterman	
1948	Speed to Spare	Al Simmons	
1948	Blondie's Reward	John D. Dickson	
1948	Give My Regards to Broadway	Mr. Boyd	(uncredited)
1948	Waterfront at Midnight	Commissioner Ryan	
1948	The Babe Ruth Story	Bagley	(scenes deleted)
1948	A Southern Yankee	Plaza Hotel Manager	(uncredited)
1948	Smugglers' Cove	Terrence Mahoney Esq	
1948	Family Honeymoon	Chancellor Fenster	
1949	John Loves Mary	Gen. Biddle	
1949	Down to the Sea in Ships	Capt. John Briggs	
1949	Duke of Chicago	Chester Cunningham	
1949	Make Believe Ballroom	George Wilcox	(uncredited)
1949	Mr. Belvedere Goes to College	Dr. Keating	
1949	Take One False Step	Mr. Arnspiger	
1949	The Fountainhead	Opera Businessman	(uncredited)
1949	The Girl from Jones Beach	Jim Townsend	
1949	Special Agent	Mr. Travis - Rancher	(uncredited)
1950	Unmasked	Harry Jackson	
1950	When Willie Comes Marching Home	Brig. Gen. Lamson	(uncredited)
1950	Side Street	Emil Lorrison	
1950	The Yellow Cab Man	Pearson Hendricks	
1950	Riding High	Whitehall	
1950	A Ticket to Tomahawk	Mr. Bishop	(uncredited)
1950	Father of the Bride	Reverend Galsworthy	
1950	The Lawless	Chief of Police Blake	
1950	The Skipper Surprised His Wife	Brendon Boyd	
1950	Three Little Words	Al Masters	
1950	Stella	Ralph Denny	(uncredited)
1950	The Milkman	D.A. Abbott	
1950	The Flying Missile	Gen. Benton, USA	
1951	Up Front	Col. Akeley	
1951	Father's Little Dividend	Rev. Galsworthy	
1951	Thunder in God's Country	Carson Masterson	
1951	The Great Caruso	Opera Benefit Master of Ceremonies	(uncredited)
1951	Excuse My Dust	Cyrus Random Sr	
1951	Let's Go Navy!	Lt. Cmdr. O. Tannen	
1951	The Tall Target	Minor Role	(uncredited)
1952	Here Come the Nelsons	Samuel T. Jones	
1952	The First Time	Leeming	
1952	Skirts Ahoy!	Old Naval Officer in Theatre	(uncredited)
1952	Has Anybody Seen My Gal	Judge Wilkins	
1952	Dreamboat	Lawyer D.W. Harrington	
1952	April in Paris	Secretary Robert Sherman	
1953	The Girl Who Had Everything	Senator Drummond	(uncredited)
1953	Remains to Be Seen	Mr. Bennett	
1953	Here Come the Girls	Mr. Newbold	(uncredited)
1953	Calamity Jane	Henry Miller	
1954	Sabrina	Dr. Calaway	(uncredited)
1955	Three for the Show	Col. Harold J. Wharton	
1955	High Society	Henry Baldwin	
1956	The Ten Commandments	Royal Physician	(uncredited)
