= Last Laugh, Mr. Moto =

Novel by John P. Marquand

Last Laugh, Mr Moto is a 1942 Mr Moto novel by John P. Marquand.

Marquand had not written a Moto novel for a number of years. He wrote one again in 1941, prior to the Japanese attack on Pearl Harbor. After the US declared war on Japan, there was some talk the novel would not be published. However it was decided that Moto was "sufficiently foiled" in his secret service activities in the novel and at the end instead of triumphing he was left "holding the bag". So the novel was published in January 1942.

== Plot ==
Bob Bolles, a beachcomber and former US officer, gets involved in a plot on Mercator Island in the Caribbean.

== Reception ==
The New York Times called it a "thrilling story told with all the artistry at Mr Marquand's command".
