= City of Chance =

1940 film

- Theatrical release poster
- Directed by: Ricardo Cortez
- Screenplay by: John Larkin; Barry Trivers
- Produced by: Sol M. Wurtzel
- Starring: Lynn Bari; C. Aubrey Smith; Donald Woods; Amanda Duff; June Gale; Richard Lane
- Cinematography: Lucien N. Andriot
- Edited by: Norman Colbert
- Music by: Samuel Kaylin
- Production company: 20th Century Fox
- Distributed by: 20th Century Fox
- Release date: January 13, 1940
- Running time: 56 minutes
- Country: United States
- Language: English

City of Chance is a 1940 American crime drama film directed by Ricardo Cortez and written by John Larkin and Barry Trivers. The film stars Lynn Bari, C. Aubrey Smith, Donald Woods and Amanda Duff. The film was released on January 13, 1940, by 20th Century Fox. The executive producer for the film was Sol M. Wurtzel.

== Plot ==
Steve Walker is a gambler in New York City high society who owns an illegal gambling house. A young Texan woman, Julie, arrives in New York and enters the casino and immediately takes a liking to him. Steve soon finds out that they were childhood sweethearts when she was a small girl known as "Pugnose" in Boonville, Texas. Despite her charm, Steve and The Judge immediately notice that she is intelligent and become suspicious of her intentions. Overhearing that a couple are due to be married but want to keep it a secret, Julie, who is a newspaper reporter, tries to contact her newspaper editor and inform them of the marriage, but Steve directs her call to his office and pretends to be the editor.

Julie overhears the woman due to be married being threatened by Baron Joseph. Julie intrudes and encounters Lois in Steve's office where Steve and The Judge confront Lynn and tell her that they know she is a reporter who has been sent to help shut his place down. The Judge informs Walker that he thinks Lynn is in love with him and the two amuse themselves by keeping her away from the telephone, which Julie becomes wise to.

Later on, Julie overhears a woman saying that she will interfere with a game with loaded dice and set up Steve. She tries to warn Steve, who playfully pushes her away, though Julie interferes at the start of the game and reveals the dice to Steve. In Steve's office, Julie is overpowered by intruder Charlie Nevins and sets off an alarm which leads to Steve and The Judge resorting to trickery to enter the office and confront him. The Judge rings Lois and tells her that everything will be fine with the Baron. Lynn tells The Judge that she wants Steve to quit the casino due to the constant danger he is in, and to return to Texas to live with her. Finally, Julie gets through to her editor to tip him off shortly before a raid by the police. Fortunately Steve had just sold the casino to rival gangster Marty Connors before the police raid, who is arrested. The Judge, making his fortune from the sale, enjoys a trip on the SS Queen.

== Cast ==
- Lynn Bari as Julie Reynolds
- C. Aubrey Smith as The Judge
- Donald Woods as Steve Walker
- Amanda Duff as Lois Carlyle Blane
- June Gale as Molly
- Richard Lane as Marty Connors
- Robert Lowery as Ted Blaine
- Alexander D'Arcy as Baron Joseph
- George Douglas as Muscles
- Harry Shannon as Passline
- Eddie Marr as Charlie Nevins
- Robert Allen as Fred Walcott
- Charlotte Wynters as Mrs. Helen Walcott
- Nora Lane as Mrs. Dorothy Grainger
