= Louise McNair =

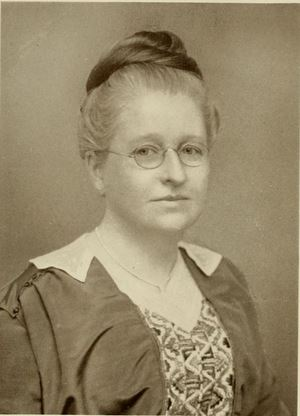
Louise McNair, Kajiwara Photo

Louise McNair (1869-1956) was a mathematics teacher and the headmistress of Hosmer Hall school for girls in St. Louis.

== Biography ==
Louise McNair was born in 1869 in St. Louis, the daughter of Charles A. McNair and Louise Donohoe (d. March 10, 1903), of Glasgow, Missouri. Charles A. McNair (1831-1907) was engaged in the iron business in St. Louis; his children were: Elizabeth McNair (1856-1857), Edwin Alonzo McNair (1858-1914), Emma Belle McNair, Louise McNair. The musician McNair Ilgenfritz was Louise McNair's nephew.

McNair was a student of Mary Institute, and after graduating there she taught three years in Hosmer Hall, and then attended Wellesley College, class of 1896. At Wellesley she was schoolmates with Sarah Chamberlin Weed and Elizabeth B. Hardee, who killed themselves in a suicide pact at the Laurens' School, the fashionable boarding school for girls they founded in the Fenway district of Boston.

Returning to school after her course at Wellesley McNair again taught Mathematics at Hosmer until the death of Martha Matthews, when she accepted the position of principal in 1903.

McNair was appointed to be the headmistress of Hosmer Hall where she had previously taught. The school was founded in 1884 by Clara G. Shepard and Martha H. Matthews, and, at a later date, was incorporated under the laws of Missouri. In 1896 Matthews assumed control of the school when it moved to its location at Washington and Pendleton Avenues.

Upon the death of Matthews in 1907, the management was transferred to Louise McNair, who was closely identified with the school. Hosmer Hall was founded a few months after Miss Cuthbert's School closed, which was one of the early schools for young girls.

McNair was the secretary of the Wednesday Club for many years, acted as treasurer and a member of the executive board, and also leader of the poetic section of the club when first founded. For several years she served as secretary of the Contemporary Club.

Louise McNair later became faculty member emeritus of Bennett College, in Millbrook, New York.

== Hosmer Hall ==
The aim of Hosmer Hall was to fit girls for the responsibilities and opportunities of later life and to develop the highest type of American womanhood.

Founded at a time when college education for women was in its initial stage, Hosmer Hall laid stress upon fitting its pupils to enter the leading women's colleges. McNair was often asked why should a girl spend time in learning mathematics and Latin in college, studies which they rarely ever put to practical uses. She believed very strongly that those subjects were of value because they gave a fine mental training. McNair believed that school work should be difficult, also that the knowledge gained from mathematics could be obtained in no other way. She believed that a girl could make a better loaf of bread by knowing Latin and mathematics. McNair said that we could start children with was a trained mind then they were prepared for whatever must be done.

She believed in children attending school full-time, and that school should be the primary focus for children while attending. Her views on extracurricular activities for children emphasized the importance of building skills- she noted a particular difference between girls learning societal norms as before and going downtown to matinees. Her goal was to train young girls' minds, in order to let them do their own thinking. After the girls graduated school, she wanted her students to have the skills necessary to make a difference, which was successful in several cases. Notable alumnae of Hosmer Hall school included Sara Teasdale, Caroline Risque, Zoe Akins, Berenice Wyer, all of whom became notable women in St. Louis.

The number of resident pupils was limited to thirty. It was the intention of the school each year to have the household composed keen students. Graduates from the school were admitted on certificate and did commendable work at Wellesley College, Smith College, Vassar College, Wells College, Mount Holyoke College, University of Michigan, University of Nebraska, University of Missouri, Washington University in St. Louis and other institutions of similar standing. Instruction in instrumental music was given by the Kroeger School of Music. The director, Ernest Kroeger, had an international reputation as a teacher, composer and concert pianist, and his assistants were all trained musicians. Hosmer Hall was bought by the state as a junior school in 1936 and although it was rebuilt in 1965 the site is still used for education.

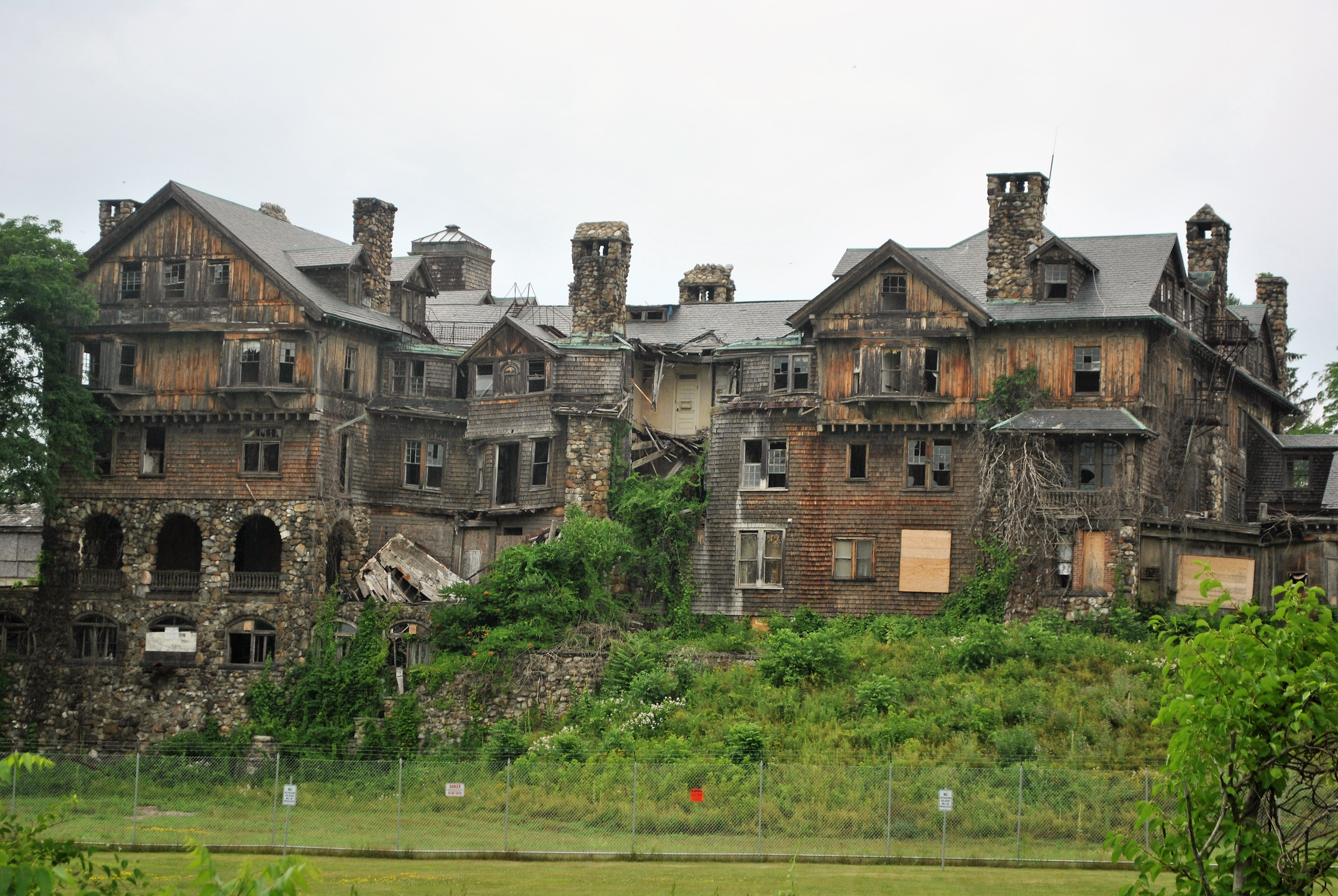
Halcyon Hall, Bennett College, in 2016

== Personal life ==
She was friends with Lillie Rose Ernst who was the first woman to become assistant superintendent of instruction in the St. Louis public school system

She died in 1956 and is buried at Bellefontaine Cemetery, Saint Louis.
