= Mr. Moto Is So Sorry =

1938 book by John P. Marquand

- Author: John P. Marquand
- Language: English
- Genre: Adventure novel, Spy fiction
- Publication date: 1938
- Publication place: United States
- Media type: Print
- Preceded by: Think Fast, Mr. Moto
- Followed by: Last Laugh, Mr. Moto

Mr. Moto Is So Sorry was originally published in serial form in the Saturday Evening Post from July 2 to August 13, 1938, and was first published in book form in 1938. It is the fourth of six Mr. Moto novels and can also be found in the omnibus Mr. Moto's Three Aces published in 1939.

The Moto novels are spy fiction and adventure novels set in the Orient, which in the 1930s was considered mysterious and exotic. Mr. Moto is a spy for the Imperial Japanese government and often deals with people who are accidentally involved in his work.

Marquand traveled to China to gather information and atmosphere for his Moto novels. Millicent Bell, Marquand’s biographer, states: “In Mr. Moto Is So Sorry, Marquand went back once more to his memories of 1934, and his hero’s journey duplicates Marquand’s own arrival in China, although there is considerably more melodramatic incident along the fictional journey.”

== Plot ==
Calvin Gates, an American, is traveling through Japan to mainland Asia. He boards a train which will eventually take him to Mongolia to join a scientific expedition. On the train is Sylvia Dillaway, a sketch artist, also on her way to the Gilbreth Expedition. Accompanying her is Boris, her Russian guide. When Mr. Moto appears, Boris becomes agitated and gives Dillaway a cigarette case made of silver inlaid with gunmetal, bearing a scenic design.

Later at a stopover Boris is killed in Gates’ hotel room. Mr. Moto comes in to clean things up and tells Gates that he knows of his past and why he is traveling to Mongolia. Gates is on the run from the police because his uncle believes that he stole money from his business. Moto asks about the cigarette case and realizes that Dillaway must have it. Moto wants the cigarette case to get to where it is headed, so he leaves the case with Dillaway.

Knowing that the cigarette case is dangerous, Gates plots with Dillaway to make it seem like the case was stolen from her hotel room. Moto, however, suspects Gates and has him searched at a train stop. Gates and Dillaway continue on their journey with the cigarette case.

At the next stop Captain Hamby comes on board. He was sent by Gilbreth to escort Dillaway to Ghuru Nor where the expedition is. However, his actual mission is to get the cigarette case to his Russian allies. The case includes a coded message meant for the Russian Army. He thinks the Japanese want to stop the message but doesn’t understand why Mr. Moto would want the message to get through.

After a misunderstanding, Gates no longer wants anything to do with this business and gives the cigarette case to Dillaway. He leaves the train in Peking and is immediately picked up by Major Ahara of the Japanese Army, who wants to stop the cigarette case from getting to the Russians. Gates is rescued by Moto who explains how the Russian Army is poised to take Inner Mongolia but is waiting for the message which will tell when the Japanese Army will move toward Ghuru Nor. However, he does not explain why he wants the message to get through.

Gates goes along with Moto and they fly to Kalgan to meet Dillaway and Hamby. Gates finds Dillaway and Dr. Gilbreth captive by Hamby in the compound of a caravan trader named Holtz. Hamby is negotiating the sale of the cigarette case between the Russians and the Japanese for Prince Wu, ruler of Ghuru Nor.

Moto is brought in and reveals that he wanted the Russians to know the Japanese Army’s plans to judge the strength and conviction of the Russians. Major Ahara is convinced that Moto is a traitor and is killed by Hamby when he tries to escape. The Russian spy Shirov, who was present to negotiate for the case, agrees with Moto that one should die depending on how the Russian Army takes the news of the Japanese Army’s plans.

Gates negotiates for his life and the lives of the expedition while they await the Russian Army’s reply. Shirov kills himself when told they will do nothing against the Japanese Army. At Moto’s suggestion, Prince Wu has Hamby killed because he killed Ahara. Moto and Japan win the rights to the Mongolian trade routes, thereby moving deeper into China.

== Characters ==
- Calvin Gates – An American from New York City
- Sylvia Dillaway - An American artist from the Mid-West
- Mr. I. A. Moto - Imperial spy for the Japanese government
- Boris - Russian guide and spy
- Captain Sam Hamby - Former Australian Army officer, currently working for Prince Wu
- Major Ahara - Japanese Army officer
- General Shirov - Russian spy and the brother to Boris
- Prince Wu - Ruler of Ghuru Nor
- Holtz - German trader in charge of the camel trade routes

== Themes ==
The West (and America in particular) is portrayed as an outsider who know nothing of what is going on in the East. Gates and Dillaway, the two Americans are oblivious to the machinations of the Japanese and the Russian armies as they wrestle for control of China. Millicent Bell, Marquand’s biographer said that Gates is,

…a man under a cloud, whose mission to China is purely personal, and who is so indifferent to politics that he allows himself to be thought a Japanese spy.

Moto feels a kinship towards Americans, often referring to his time spent there. Though Moto does not always understand their actions or motivations he is able to manipulate Gates into fitting his plans. Major Ahara, Moto’s political opposite, does not like America and looks forward to the day they go to war. These multiple factions within the Japanese government are often referred to in Marquand’s Moto novels and figure in making Mr. Moto’s job difficult by giving him many fronts to fight against. This duality may have given the pre-WWII reading audience a chance to see the Japanese as multi-dimensional people at a time when Japan was still mysterious.
