= The Late George Apley (film) =

1947 film by Joseph L. Mankiewicz

- Theatrical release poster
- Directed by: Joseph L. Mankiewicz
- Screenplay by: Philip Dunne
- Based on: The Late George Apley by John P. Marquand
- Produced by: Fred Kohlmar
- Starring: Ronald Colman; Vanessa Brown; Richard Haydn; Charles Russell; Richard Ney
- Cinematography: Joseph LaShelle
- Edited by: James B. Clark
- Music by: Cyril J. Mockridge
- Production company: 20th Century-Fox
- Distributed by: 20th Century-Fox
- Release date: March 20, 1947
- Running time: 98 minutes
- Country: United States
- Language: English

The Late George Apley is a 1947 American romantic comedy film about a stuffy, upper-class Bostonian who is forced to adjust to a changing world. It starred Ronald Colman in the title role and was based on John P. Marquand's novel of the same name and the subsequent play by Marquand and George S. Kaufman. A 45-minute adaptation starring Raymond Massey and Joanne Woodward was made in 1955, and aired as an episode of The 20th Century Fox Hour on CBS television.

== Plot ==
It is 1912, and George Apley (Ronald Colman) is a stuffy, self-satisfied member of Boston's upper class, supremely confident of the superiority of his hometown and his family. He is fond of quoting Ralph Waldo Emerson at every opportunity. For 18 years, he has hosted Thanksgiving dinners at his home, but the dinner that opens the film marks an irrevocable change. His comfortable, predictable world is overturned when he learns, to his horror, that both his son and his daughter have fallen in love with non-Bostonians instead of with the partners Mr. Apley and the family have arranged. Son John, always intended for his cousin Agnes, a shy girl who adores him, has fallen for Myrtle, the daughter of a successful manufacturer who lives in Worcester. Daughter Eleanor is in love with Howard Boulder, a lecturer at Harvard who eventually loses his position through George's interference. Among Boulder's offenses, besides coming from New York and attending Yale, is his teaching that Emerson was, for his time, a radical (which George has accepted by the end of the film). George really begins to see himself through others' eyes when he is rejected for president of the bird-watching club because of his refusal to allow an undesirable relative to be buried in the family plot and because of his actions to separate the young lovers.

Mrs. Apley divulges to Agnes that George had once been in love with a vivacious local Irish girl, and was sent abroad to recover. When he returned, they were married and, she says, found some happiness. Roger Newcombe, George's brother-in-law and friend, reminds George of how he felt all those years ago when he was separated from the girl he loved. George tries to change, and he invites Myrtle's father to his club to discuss planning the careful introduction of their family to Boston society in preparation for announcing John and Myrtle's engagement. But Myrtle's father surprises him by saying that he knows his daughter and he knows John, and neither would be happy living in the other's world. He plans to send Myrtle away to California for a year or two, to forget.

Time passes, and Eleanor returns from her own long trip abroad in time to be a bridesmaid at John and Agnes' wedding. Eleanor is afraid that Howard has forgotten her, not knowing that George has stopped their letters. Eleanor and Agnes talk during the fitting of Agnes' wedding dress, a family heirloom that smothers her in antique lace. A forlorn Agnes, who knows about Myrtle, confesses her lack of confidence, and Eleanor tells her to “fight.” Agnes vows that she can at least give John a good-looking wife, and she convinces George to take her shopping in New York City. George is persuaded to let her buy the charming modern clothes she desires, and the day seems a success until they meet Howard Boulder and his friends on the street. Boulder, who is bitter at the loss of Eleanor, introduces George to his friends with scathing sarcasm.

At the wedding, John is nervous because he hasn't seen Agnes and is afraid she will not show up. George takes Eleanor out to the street in front of the church, where Howard is waiting. George gives them the steamship tickets that were for John and Agnes' honeymoon and tells them the captain of the ship will marry them. Eleanor embraces him, and the lovers drive away. Back in the church, everyone is ready to begin. Agnes comes down the aisle, a vision in a lovely gown and a tulle veil that sets off her beautifully dressed dark hair. John beams; George and Catherine link arms and smile at their son's happiness.

Despite the film's title, unlike in the book and play, George Apley does not die in the film.

== Cast ==
- Ronald Colman as George Apley
- Vanessa Brown as Agnes Willing, fiancée of Apley's son
- Richard Haydn as Horatio Willing, George's cousin
- Charles Russell as Howard Boulder, a visiting lecturer who falls in love with Apley's daughter
- Richard Ney as John Apley, George's son
- Percy Waram as Roger Newcombe, George's brother-in-law
- Mildred Natwick as Amelia Newcombe, George's forceful sister
- Edna Best as Catherine Apley, George's wife
- Nydia Westman as Jane Willing
- Peggy Cummins as Eleanor Apley, George's daughter

== Reception ==
The New York Times reviewer Bosley Crowther panned the film, writing "The Late George Apley has been botched on the screen -- but good!" Ben Sachs of the Chicago Reader was less severe, stating "The movie wears its literary origins on its sleeve; virtually all the action is dialogue driven, and that dialogue tends to be dry and rhetorical...Few Hollywood filmmakers had his [Joseph L. Mankiewicz's] flair for staging verbose conversation; this remains effervescent and visually elegant even when the material verges on stodginess."
