= Amanda Duff =

American actress

- Born: March 6, 1914; Fresno, California, United States
- Died: April 6, 2006 (aged 92); San Francisco, California; United States
- Occupation: Actress
- Spouse: Philip Dunne (1939-1992, his death)
- Children: 3 daughters

Amanda Duff (March 6, 1914 - April 6, 2006) was an American actress on stage and in films.

== Biography ==
Duff was born in Fresno, California, on March 6, 1914, and grew up in Santa Barbara, California. She went on to study music at Mills College and later to study piano in New York City.

=== Early years ===
She was discovered by the playwright Robert E. Sherwood who cast her in a Broadway production of Tovarich (1936). She played Helene DuPont, a daughter of a rich family.

Duff's films included The Devil Commands (1941) and Mr. Moto in Danger Island (1939).

In 1939, she married screenwriter and film director Philip Dunne. They had three daughters.

=== Later life ===
After Duff retired from acting, she took up photography. Her work was recognized when the presentation "Glimpses of the USA" at the American National Exhibition in Moscow in 1959 include some of her photographs of American children.

On April 6, 2006, Duff died of cancer in San Francisco, California, at age 92. She was survived by three daughters, a brother, and two grandchildren.

== Filmography ==
- Just Around the Corner (1938)
- Mr. Moto on Danger Island (1938)
- The Three Musketeers (1939, uncredited)
- Hotel for Women (1939)
- The Escape (1939)
- City of Chance (1940)
- Star Dust (1940, uncredited)
- The Devil Commands (1941)
