= Just Around the Corner (1938 film) =

1938 US musical comedy film by Irving Cummings

- Theatrical release poster
- Directed by: Irving Cummings
- Screenplay by: Ethel Hill; J. P. McEvoy; Darrell Ware
- Based on: Lucky Penny by Paul Gerard Smith
- Produced by: Darryl F. Zanuck; David Hempstead
- Starring: Shirley Temple; Charles Farrell; Bert Lahr; Bill Robinson
- Cinematography: Arthur C. Miller
- Edited by: Walter Thompson
- Music by: Harold Spina
- Distributed by: 20th Century Fox
- Release date: November 11, 1938
- Running time: 68 minutes
- Country: United States
- Language: English

Just Around the Corner is a 1938 American musical comedy film directed by Irving Cummings, and written by Ethel Hill, Darrell Ware and J. P. McEvoy, based on the novel Lucky Penny by Paul Gerard Smith. The film stars Shirley Temple as young Penny Hale, who must cope with the consequences after her architect father is forced by circumstances to accept a job as a janitor. It was the fourth and last cinematic song and dance pairing of Temple and Bill Robinson.

== Plot ==
Penny Hale is attending a private girls' school when she is informed that her enrollment has ended and she will be heading home to live with her widowed father, Jeff Hale. She accepts this revelation as good news, unaware that her father, a prominent architect, is in dire financial straits and can no longer afford Penny's tuition. Furthermore, Jeff has lost his penthouse apartment and his car, but he has secured a menial job in the building as its custodian so he and Penny will still have a home: Jeff and Penny now reside in a small basement dwelling. Although Jeff is humbled by this downturn in his career, the always optimistic Penny looks upon this change of life as an adventure. Penny often runs afoul of Waters, an overly officious apartment employee, who tries to keep her out of places in the building she once frequented when her father was wealthy.

Jeff is romantically linked with Lola, the niece of the disagreeable woman who now occupies his old apartment. Lola's uncle, Samuel Henshaw, is a major financier who once employed Jeff to design a major building project, but discontinued it. Penny also befriends Lola's brother Milton, a somewhat pampered and effete boy. Penny assists him in shedding his prim and snobbish appearance, cutting off his prominent curls, in an attempt to make him look more like a "he-man."

A discouraged Jeff explains to Penny that the United States is mired in the Great Depression because Uncle Sam is being pestered by too many people who want his money. He shows her a newspaper cartoon that illustrates this idea. Penny discovers that Samuel Henshaw is referred to as "Uncle Sam" by his niece and nephew and does bear a strong resemblance to the symbolic Uncle Sam in the newspaper cartoon. Penny amusingly believes Samuel Henshaw is actually Uncle Sam. Henshaw considers re-hiring Jeff and assigning him to a project in far-off Borneo to keep him away from Lola.

Shortly thereafter Penny sees Henshaw being accosted by a group of pushy reporters. She helps drive them away with a few well-placed kicks to their shins. Penny tells Henshaw she sympathizes with him because of all the people who are trying to siphon money from "Uncle Sam." The irascible Henshaw takes a liking to Penny. She eventually decides to stage a benefit for Henshaw, charging a nickel apiece for a show that features a song-and-dance performance by her and Corporal Jones, the apartment building's doorman. This action impresses Samuel Henshaw so much that he announces the building project that he had earlier abandoned will be restarted with Jeff in charge. Jeff and Lola plan to be married.

== Cast ==
- Shirley Temple as Penny Hale
- Joan Davis as Kitty
- Charles Farrell as Jeff Hale
- Amanda Duff as Lola Ramsby
- Bill Robinson as Corporal Jones
- Bert Lahr as Gus
- Franklin Pangborn as Waters
- Cora Witherspoon as Aunt Julia Ramsby
- Claude Gillingwater Sr. as Samuel G. Henshaw
- Bennie Bartlett as Milton Ramsby

== Production ==
The relationship between the Temples and Fox head Darryl F. Zanuck took an irreparable turn during production. Temple's mother Gertrude, unhappy with the script and cast, scheduled a strained meeting with Zanuck to express her frustrations. Dissatisfied with his response, she went to studio chairman Joseph Schenck, who supported Zanuck and refused to take the matter up with him. Direct communication eventually broke down, signaling the beginning of a chain of events that eventually led to Temple's parents opting out of her contract in 1940.

Zanuck brought in Charles Farrell for what was hoped to be a comeback role. Director Irving Cummings tracked down Farrell at a racquetball club, catching him completely by surprise with the offer. The comeback attempt never materialized, however, as his career would be over by the end of the decade. Temple's dog Ching-Ching II was brought in as an extra for $5. When the script called for her to bathe him in one scene, Temple managed to negotiate an extra $2.50.
