= Manhattan Heartbeat =

1940 film

- Theatrical release poster
- Directed by: David Burton
- Screenplay by: Clark Andrews; Harold Buchman; Jack Jungmeyer; Edith Skouras
- Based on: Bad Girl by Viña Delmar
- Produced by: Sol M. Wurtzel
- Starring: Robert Sterling; Virginia Gilmore; Joan Davis; Edmund MacDonald; Don Beddoe; Paul Harvey
- Cinematography: Virgil Miller
- Edited by: Alex Troffey
- Music by: Cyril J. Mockridge
- Production company: 20th Century Fox
- Distributed by: 20th Century Fox
- Release date: July 12, 1940
- Running time: 72 minutes
- Country: United States
- Language: English

Manhattan Heartbeat is a 1940 American drama film directed by David Burton and written by Clark Andrews, Harold Buchman, Jack Jungmeyer and Edith Skouras. It is based on the 1928 novel Bad Girl by Viña Delmar. The film stars Robert Sterling, Virginia Gilmore, Joan Davis, Edmund MacDonald, Don Beddoe and Paul Harvey. The film was released on July 12, 1940, by 20th Century Fox.

== Plot ==
Johnny Farrell is an airplane mechanic who has to test aircraft in order to make some extra money to support his relationship.

== Cast ==
- Robert Sterling as Johnny Farrell
- Virginia Gilmore as Dottie Haley
- Joan Davis as Edna Higgins
- Edmund MacDonald as Spike
- Don Beddoe as Preston
- Paul Harvey as Dr. Bentley
- Irving Bacon as Sweeney
- Mary Carr as Grandma in Music Store
- Ann Doran as Shop Girl's Friend
- James Flavin as Truck Driver
- Edgar Dearing as Policeman
- Jan Duggan as Wife
- Harry Tyler as Husband
- Steve Pendleton as Tony
- Edward Earle as Official
- Murray Alper as Mechanic
- Dick Winslow as Bus Driver
- George Reed as Porter
- Louise Lorimer as Nurse
- Ruth Warren as Nurse
- Emmett Vogan as Doctor
- Lenita Lane as Bentley's Nurse
