= Murder in Trinidad (novel) =

1933 novel

- Author: John Vandercook
- Language: English
- Series: Bertram Lynch
- Genre: Mystery
- Publisher: The Crime Club
- Publication date: 1933
- Publication place: United States
- Media type: Print
- Followed by: Murder in Fiji

Murder in Trinidad is a 1933 mystery novel by the British-born American writer John Vandercook. It was the first in series of four novels by Vandercook featuring Bertram Lynch, a British investigator working for the League of Nations. It was followed by Murder in Fiji in 1936 and two further entries in the 1950s. The novels are narrated by Robert Deane, a professor of history from Yale who Lynch befriends on board ship.

== Synopsis ==
Lynch is called to Trinidad, a British colony, to investigate opium smugglers based on the island. The previous man on the job has been killed, and Lynch and his new friend Deane go undercover to infiltrate the criminal's base in the middle of a swamp. Lynch also uncovers the truth about the murder of a past governor of the island several years before.

== Film adaptations ==
In 1934 it was adapted by Fox Film Corporation into a film of the same title starring Nigel Bruce. 20th Century Fox, the successor studio, used it as the basis for two more films: Mr. Moto in Danger Island (1939) part of the Mr. Moto series starring Peter Lorre and The Caribbean Mystery (1945) featuring James Dunn.

== Bibliography ==
- Backer, Ron. Mystery Movie Series of 1930s Hollywood. McFarland, 2012.
- Goble, Alan. The Complete Index to Literary Sources in Film. Walter de Gruyter, 1999.
