= The Devil Commands =

1941 film

- Theatrical poster
- Directed by: Edward Dmytryk
- Screenplay by: Robert Hardy Andrews; Milton Gunzburg
- Based on: The Edge of Running Water by William Sloane
- Produced by: Wallace MacDonald
- Starring: Boris Karloff; Amanda Duff; Richard Fiske
- Cinematography: Allen G. Siegler
- Edited by: Al Clark
- Music by: Morris Stoloff
- Production company: Columbia Pictures
- Distributed by: Columbia Pictures
- Release date: February 3, 1941
- Running time: 65 minutes
- Country: United States
- Language: English

The Devil Commands is a 1941 American horror film directed by Edward Dmytryk and starring Boris Karloff, Amanda Duff and Richard Fiske. The working title of the film was The Devil Said No. In it, a man obsessed with contacting his dead wife falls in with a sinister phony medium. The Devil Commands is one of the many films from the 1930s and 1940s in which Karloff was cast as a mad scientist with a good heart. It was one of the last in line of the low-budget horror films that were produced before Universal Studios' The Wolf Man. The story was adapted from the novel The Edge of Running Water by William Sloane.

== Plot ==
Dr. Julian Blair is engaged in unconventional research on human brain waves when his wife Helen is tragically killed in an auto accident. The grief-stricken scientist becomes obsessed with redirecting his work into making contact with the dead and is not deterred by dire warnings from his daughter Anne, his research assistant Richard, or his colleagues that he is delving into forbidden areas of knowledge. He moves his laboratory to an isolated New England mansion where he continues to try to reach out to his dead wife. He is aided in his experiments by his mentally-challenged servant Karl and abetted by the obsessive Mrs. Walters, a phony medium, who believes in his work and seems to exert a sinister influence over him. When their overly curious housekeeper discovers the truth about their experiments, her death brings the local sheriff in to investigate the strange goings on.

== Cast ==
- Boris Karloff as Dr. Julian Blair
- Richard Fiske as Dr. Richard Sayles
- Amanda Duff as Anne Blair
- Anne Revere as Mrs. Walters
- Ralph Penney as Karl
- Dorothy Adams as Mrs. Marcy
- Walter Baldwin as Seth Marcy
- Kenneth MacDonald as Sheriff Ed Willis
- Shirley Warde as Helen Blair

== Reception ==
From retrospective reviews, Tony Rayns reviewed the film in Sight & Sound as part of the Karloff at Columbia Blu-ray set. Rayns compared the film to The Black Room, The Man They Could Not Hang, The Man With Nine Lives, Before I Hang, and The Boogie Man Will Get You noting that the stand out of the set was The Devil Commands with "Karloff denouncing fake spiritualists and seeking a scientific way to contact his beloved late wife."

== See also ==
- Boris Karloff filmography
