= Your Turn, Mr. Moto =

1935 novel by John P. Marquand

- Author: John P. Marquand
- Language: English
- Genre: Spy novel
- Publisher: Little Brown & Co
- Publication date: 1935
- Publication place: United States
- Media type: Print
- Pages: 281

Your Turn, Mr. Moto (originally published under the title No Hero and later as Mr. Moto Takes a Hand) is a 1935 spy novel by John P. Marquand and the debut novel in the Mr. Moto series.

The story was first serialized in the Saturday Evening Post.

The New York Times said Marquand tells his story "superlatively well."

== Main characters ==
- K.C. (Casey) Lee - Former Naval Aviator, now known for his flying exploits. He is in a downturn in his professional and personal life.
- Mr. Moto - An agent for the Japanese government.
- Sonya Karaloff - White Russian, initially working with Mr. Moto.
- Commander Jim Driscoll - An old wartime friend of Casey Lee, currently working for Naval Intelligence.
- Ma - A former servant and interpreter for Sonya Karaloff's father.
- Wu Lai-fu - Influential and powerful leader in the Chinese underworld.
- Sam Bloom - Old wartime friend of Casey Lee, currently working as a flight instructor in China.

== Plot ==
Casey Lee has travelled to Japan on the promise of flying a promotional flight across the pacific. When this is cancelled, he drunkenly rants about his opinions about various subjects, including his dislike of his homeland, the United States of America.

This results in Sonya Karaloff influencing him to listen to an offer by Mr. Moto to fly across the Pacific in a Japanese plane. This is only to lure them into their real purpose, to have Casey act as a spy for Japan.

During a trip by ship to Shanghai, Casey has several encounters that reveal there are other people with interest in whatever it is that Mr Moto wants. When it appears that Casey is hiding a message that Mr Moto needs, it becomes obvious that they plan to kill him. This motivates Casey to jump through a porthole to try to swim to shore.

Casey is picked up by a small boat, and upon uttering the name "Wu Lai-fu" he is taken to the crimelord's home. For reasons unclear to Casey, after some questioning he is sent away and told to leave China soon.

Casey has another encounter with his friend Jim Driscoll to try to explain the recent events and how they may be linked to America's interests. This meeting goes results in an argument.

Casey meets up with Sonya at a nightclub and is ambushed. When he escapes with Sonya, they find the secret message and agree to fly to a remote village in China to recover a chemical formula. After arriving in the town and securing the formula there is a disagreement between Casey and Sonya regarding what to do with it. In the end it is destroyed, just before Mr Moto appears.

In the end, Casey and Sonya appear to be leaving China to have a life together.
