= High School (1940 film) =

- Theatrical release poster
- Directed by: George Nicholls, Jr.
- Screenplay by: Jack Jungmeyer; Edith Skouras; Harold Tarshis
- Produced by: Sol M. Wurtzel
- Starring: Jane Withers; Joe Brown Jr. Lloyd Corrigan; Claire Du Brey; Lynne Roberts; Paul Harvey; Cliff Edwards; Lillian Porter; John Kellogg
- Cinematography: Lucien N. Andriot
- Edited by: Harry Reynolds
- Music by: Gene Rose
- Production company: 20th Century Fox
- Distributed by: 20th Century Fox
- Release date: January 26, 1940
- Running time: 74 minutes
- Country: United States
- Language: English

High School is a 1940 American teen comedy film directed by George Nicholls, Jr. and written by Jack Jungmeyer, Edith Skouras, and Harold Tarshis. The film stars Jane Withers as a spirited 13-year-old tomboy who is sent from her widowed father's ranch to learn at Thomas Jefferson High School in San Antonio, Texas, where she alienates her fellow students with her arrogant and know-it-all personality. The script draws from the real-life activities of the high school's JROTC, band, and "Lassos" girls pep squad.

== Plot ==
Growing up on her widower dad's ranch, Jane Wallace has become a big-mouthed tomboy. After she pranks her tutors for the umpteenth time, James Wallace decides to send her off to San Antonio to the Thomas Jefferson High School run by his brother, Henry, who is none too pleased that his niece, known for her high-handed shenanigans, is coming.

Accompanied by her father's cowhand Jeff Jefferson, Jane shows up at the school and is greeted with a royal welcome when the students mistake Jeff for Franklin Jefferson, an honored descendant of the school's founder who is also arriving that day. Jane alienates her freshman classmates with her cocky attitude and the girls, led by Cuddles Dixon, decide to put her in her place. During the welcoming ceremony on the school field, Cuddles humiliates Jane, and continues to devise schemes to embarrass her. Meanwhile, Jane's uncle decides to humble her by bumping her up to the sophomore class, where she smoothly answers the teacher's quiz questions when no one else does. What she doesn't know is that the class had been trying to protect star football player "Slats" Roberts, a less than stellar student, who subsequently flunks the test and is barred from playing in a big game the next day. Everyone blames Jane for the team's defeat, and when Jane tries out for the "Lasso Girls", she is the only girl not selected.

Jane packs her bags to return home in frustration, but Slats' older sister, Carol, takes pity on her and suggests that she tutor Slats as a way to make up for her missteps. Slats, who has a crush on Jane, does well on the next test and is allowed back on the team, which wins the next game. Jane also helps Carol get the attention of Tommy, an ROTC student whom Cuddles has also set her sights on. Then Jane overhears a conversation in the principal's office which reveals that Slats is under suspicion by the police for aiding a gang of stolen-car thieves in his work at an automobile repair shop. Jane goes to warn Slats but the criminals arrive and haul her off to a side room while they interrogate Slats. Jane escapes by knocking out her captor with a mechanized pulley and runs back to the school, where she rallies the entire ROTC unit to come rescue Slats. The students brawl with the criminals until the police come. In the final scene, Carol and Tommy appear at the ROTC ball as the major and major's lady, and Jane is accepted by the other girls into the "Lasso Girls". She and Slats do the jitterbug.

== Cast ==
- Jane Withers as Jane Wallace
- Joe Brown Jr. as Slats Roberts
- Paul Harvey as James Wallace
- Lloyd Corrigan as Dr. Henry Wallace
- Cliff Edwards as Jeff Jefferson
- Claire Du Brey as Miss Huggins
- Lillian Porter as Cuddles Dixon
- Lynne Roberts as Carol Roberts
- John Kellogg as Tommy Lee
- Margaret Brayton as Miss Witherspoon
- Marvin Stephens as Bill
- Johnnie Pirrone Jr. as Terry
- Mary McCarty as Mary
- Emma Dunn as Mrs. O'Neill
- Joan Leslie as Patsy
- Betty Brian as One of the Brian Sisters
- Gwen Brian as One of the Brian Sisters
- Doris Brian as One of the Brian Sisters

== Production ==
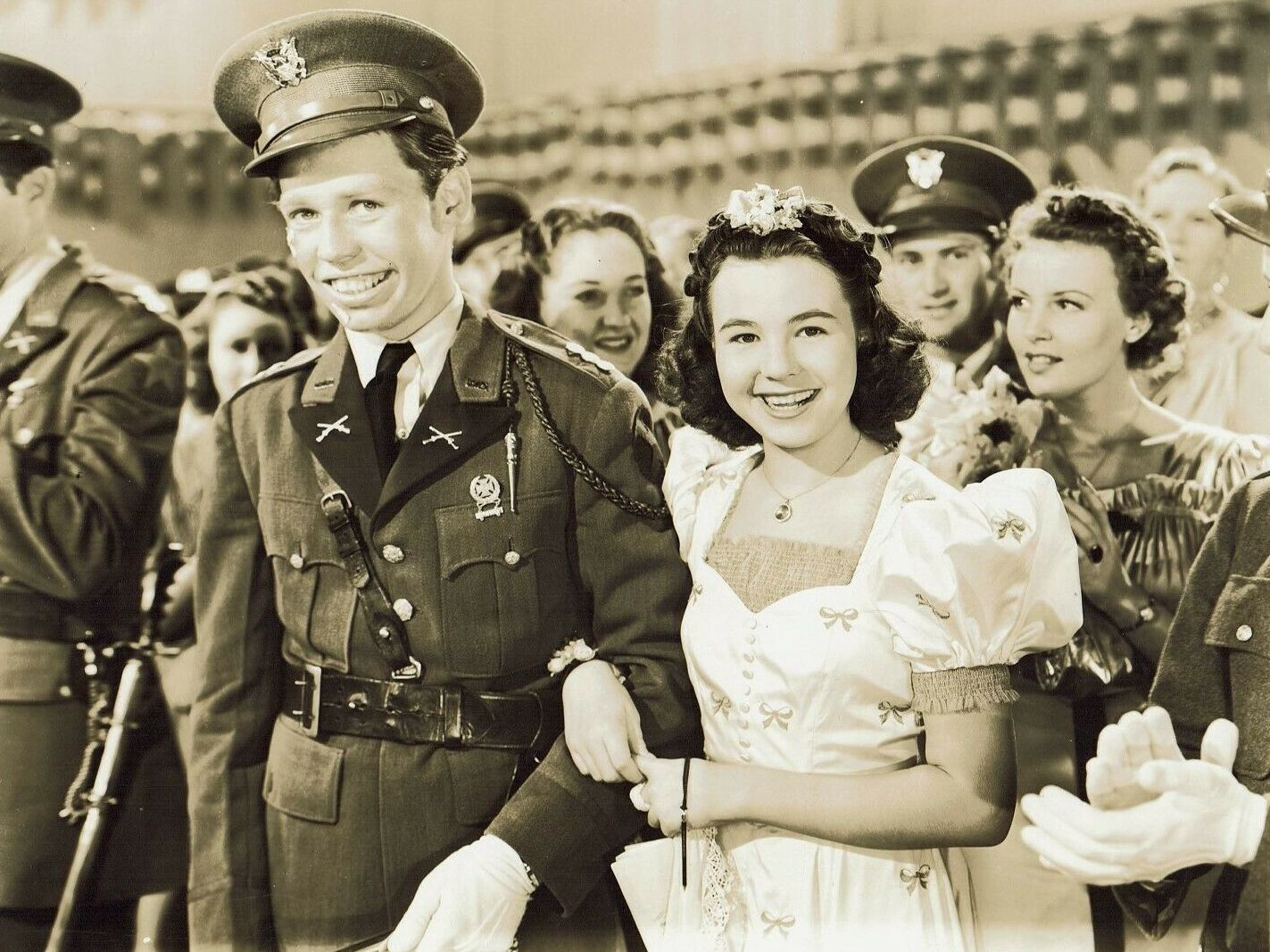
Jane Withers and Joe Brown Jr. in the final scene

=== Development ===
Executive producer Sol Wurtzel jumpstarted the project after reading a March 7, 1938, article about Thomas Jefferson High School of San Antonio, Texas, in Life magazine. (Note: The San Antonio Express News credits the idea to Darryl Zanuck who read the article.) The article illustrated the school's many extracurricular activities, including an ROTC unit and a 150-girl pep squad known as the "Lassos". Wurtzel also envisioned the film as the first in a series of films featuring Jane Withers in school settings, with this film coinciding with the actress's own matriculation into high school. The project had the working title of The Texas Kid.

The original opening scene, which had Withers "riding a cow-pony and 'bull-dogging' a steer", was rewritten to feature Withers singing and dancing instead. The change was made in response to a review of Withers' fan mail, in which eight out of ten letters called for her to sing and dance more in her films. Withers and Cliff "Ukulele Ike" Edwards performed the traditional cowboy song "The Old Chisholm Trail" with new lyrics by Sidney Clare. As an aside, The Atlanta Constitution noted that in Withers's first stage performance at age three, she had impersonated "Ukulele Ike".

Sam Garrett, a world champion roper, coached Withers and the fictional members of the "Lasso Girls" on the "art of lasso-twirling".

=== Casting ===
According to contemporary press releases, "many of the teenage actors won their roles in the picture after being filmed at Withers' thirteenth birthday party". Withers herself had made a 16mm film of her guests and showed it to producer John Stone, who was assigned the job of casting "types" for the film. Joe Brown Jr. was reportedly signed after being spotted by Wurtzel on a billboard advertisement for motor oil; he was also a skilled jitterbug dancer. Marion Reese, a member of the real "Lassos" pep squad, doubled for Withers in the film.

=== Music ===
The film features the songs "The Old Chisholm Trail", a traditional melody with new lyrics by Sidney Clare, and "Il bacio" ("The Kiss") by Luigi Arditi.

=== Filming ===
Filming took place from August 7 to the beginning of September, 1939. Exterior shots were taken at Thomas Jefferson High School, while other scenes were filmed in Torrance, California. According to Frank Thompson, author of Texas Hollywood: Filmmaking in San Antonio Since 1910, Withers did not film her scenes on location, but performed against a rear-projection screen; scenes of her in front of the school were filmed by a body double.

== Release ==
The film was released on January 26, 1940.

== Critical reception ==
The Jackson Sun called High School "a remarkably good comedy" as well as an "authentic...picture of American high school life".

The Evening News noted that Withers "graduates to adolescence" in this film. This review complimented her for dancing and singing "passably well"; it also said she "is developing a modest flair for low comedy". It also predicted a positive future for Joe Brown Jr., in teenage films, writing: "Anything but handsome, young Mr. Brown possesses the other virtues of acting ability and a decided infectious personality".

The New York Daily News also observed the physical change in Withers, writing: "From a chubby lass of last year, she is stretching into a svelt and lissom sub-deb". While Withers performs with "her usual exuberance", this review acknowledged Brown's "freckle-faced, open-mouthed, slow-thinking" character for providing "a good foil for the sharpness and vivacity of the young star".
