= Murder in Trinidad =

1934 film by Louis King

- Directed by: Louis King
- Written by: Seton I. Miller
- Based on: Murder in Trinidad by John Vandercook
- Produced by: Sol M. Wurtzel
- Starring: Nigel Bruce; Heather Angel; Victor Jory; Murray Kinnell
- Cinematography: Barney McGill
- Edited by: Alfred DeGaetano
- Music by: David Buttolph
- Production company: Fox Film Corporation
- Distributed by: Fox Film Corporation
- Release date: May 16, 1934
- Running time: 74 minutes
- Country: United States
- Language: English

Murder in Trinidad is a 1934 American pre-Code mystery film directed by Louis King and starring Nigel Bruce, Heather Angel, Victor Jory, and Murray Kinnell. It was produced and distributed by Fox Film. It is based on the 1933 novel Murder in Trinidad by John Vandercook, which provided the loose inspiration for the later films Mr. Moto in Danger Island (1939) and The Caribbean Mystery (1945).

== Plot ==
Bertram Lynch, a seemingly slow-witted detective, is called in by the Governor of Trinidad to investigate stolen Brazilian diamonds that are being smuggled through the island. When the Governor is then murdered, Lynch leads the search for the culprit with the assistance of Joan, the girlfriend of the Governor's nephew.

== Cast ==
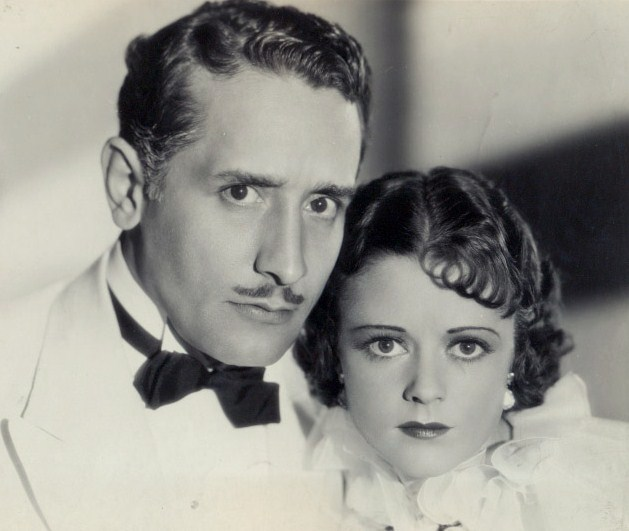
Victor Jory and Heather Angel.

- Nigel Bruce as Bertram Lynch
- Heather Angel as Joan Cassell
- Victor Jory as Howard Sutter
- Murray Kinnell as Colonel Bruce Cassell
- Douglas Walton as Gregory Bronson
- J. Carrol Naish as Duval
- Claude King as Sir Ellery Bronson - Governor
- Pat Somerset as Inspector Henley
- Francis Ford as Davenant
- John Davidson as Gookol Moah
- Noble Johnson as Queechie
- Harvey Clark as Getchel
- Perry Ivins as Doctor Barnett
- Paul Panzer as Paolo
- Allan Sears as Hunter
- Arthur Shirley as Customs Doctor
- Maidel Turner as Hysterical Woman
- Jesse Graves as Library Custodian
- Jean Fenwick as Telephone Operator

== Bibliography ==
- Backer, Ron. Mystery Movie Series of 1930s Hollywood. McFarland, 2012.
- Goble, Alan. The Complete Index to Literary Sources in Film. Walter de Gruyter, 1999.
- Solomon, Aubrey. The Fox Film Corporation, 1915-1935: A History and Filmography. McFarland, 2011.
