= The Escape (1939 film) =

American crime film by Ricardo Cortez

- Theatrical release poster
- Directed by: Ricardo Cortez
- Screenplay by: Robert Ellis; Helen Logan
- Produced by: Sol M. Wurtzel
- Starring: Kane Richmond; Amanda Duff; June Gale; Edward Norris; Henry Armetta; Frank Reicher
- Cinematography: Edward Cronjager
- Edited by: Fred Allen
- Production company: 20th Century Fox
- Distributed by: 20th Century Fox
- Release date: October 6, 1939
- Running time: 63 minutes
- Country: United States
- Language: English

The Escape is a 1939 American crime film directed by Ricardo Cortez and written by Robert Ellis and Helen Logan. The film stars Kane Richmond, Amanda Duff, June Gale, Edward Norris, Henry Armetta and Frank Reicher. The film was released on October 6, 1939, by 20th Century Fox.

== Cast ==
- Kane Richmond as Eddie Farrell
- Amanda Duff as Juli Peronni
- June Gale as Annie Qualen
- Edward Norris as Louie Peronni
- Henry Armetta as Guiseppi Peronni
- Frank Reicher as Dr. Shumaker
- Scotty Beckett as Willie Rogers
- Leona Roberts as Aunt Mamie Qualen
- Rex Downing as Tommy Rogers
- Jimmy Butler as Jim Rogers
- Roger McGee as Swat
- Richard Lane as David Clifford
- Jack Carson as Chet Warren
- Matt McHugh as Pete
- Helen Ericson as Helen Gardner
