= To Walk the Night =

1937 novel by William Sloane

To Walk the Night is a 1937 novel by William Sloane.

== Plot ==
Berkeley "Bark" M. Jones is returning from the house of Dr Lister, the father of Bark's friend Jerry Lister. Jerry has committed suicide, and Bark explains why.

Two years earlier, the two men had returned to university to visit Professor LeNormand, who they had known as students. As they entered his observatory, they saw LeNormand burning to death in a mysterious fire that doesn't burn the chair he is sitting in. As they investigate his death, they meet the beautiful though uncanny Selena, who had married LeNormand just three months earlier.

Jerry falls in love with Selena, which unsettles Bark. Jerry and Selena move to New York, and plan to marry. Selena is brilliantly intelligent but ignorant of all art and culture. A detective investigating LeNormand's death reveals that just before his marriage, a mentally disabled girl matching Selena's appearance had gone missing.

Jerry and Selena move to the Southwestern desert. Jerry finally deciphers LeNormand's equations, and realizes Selena's true nature: an alien who can inhabit human bodies. Devastated, he shoots himself in the head.

At Dr Lister's house, Selena arrives. She explains that she killed LeNormand by mistake, trying to erase the knowledge from his brain. She says she does not need to kill Bark or Dr Lister, because no one will believe them without LeNormand's and Bark's equations, which she has destroyed.

== Reception ==
Groff Conklin described To Walk The Night as "a subtle, moving story of mood and character, written in the great tradition of British fantasy, even though the author is an American." Anthony Boucher praised the same novel for its "rich warm character-drawing, disturbing subtlety, [and] splendid sense of vast beauty in the midst of terror." P. Schuyler Miller ranked it as "one of the great classics of modern science fiction." Hartford Courant reviewer George W. Earley praised it as "a wondrous blending of science and occultism guaranteed to unnerve the most blasé of readers."

Author Robert Bloch included To Walk the Night on his list of favourite horror novels.

To Walk the Night and the Edge of Running Water were published together as The Rim of Morning in 1964, and reissued in 2015 with an introduction by Stephen King. King wrote, "They are good stories and can be read simply for pleasure, but what makes them fascinating and takes them to a higher level is their complete (and rather blithe) disregard of genre boundaries."
