= William Sloane (writer) =

American novelist and publisher (1906–1974)

- Born: August 15, 1906; Plymouth, Massachusetts, U.S.
- Died: September 25, 1974 (aged 68); New City, New York, U.S.
- Education: Princeton University

William Milligan Sloane III (August 15, 1906 – September 25, 1974) was an American writer of fantasy and science fiction literature, and publisher. Sloane is known best for his novel To Walk the Night.

From 1955 until his death in New City, New York, Sloane was the director of the Rutgers University Press in New Jersey. Before then, he had spent more than 25 years working for several other publishers. He formed his own publishing company, William Sloane Associates, in 1946. William Morrow & Company acquired the company in 1952.

== Early life ==
Sloane was born in Plymouth, Massachusetts, attended The Hill School and graduated from Princeton University in 1929.

== Personal life ==
Sloane married Julia Margaret Hawkins in 1929. They had three children: William Curtis Sloane (born 1932), Jessie Miranda Sloane (born 1935), and Julie Ann Sloane (born 1945).

== Critical reception ==
Groff Conklin described To Walk The Night as "a subtle, moving story of mood and character, written in the great tradition of British fantasy, even though the author is an American." Anthony Boucher praised the same novel for its "rich warm character-drawing, disturbing subtlety, [and] splendid sense of vast beauty in the midst of terror." P. Schuyler Miller ranked it as "one of the great classics of modern science fiction." Hartford Courant reviewer George W. Earley praised it as "a wondrous blending of science and occultism guaranteed to unnerve the most blasé of readers."

Author Robert Bloch included To Walk the Night on his list of favourite horror novels.

To Walk the Night and The Edge of Running Water were published together as The Rim of Morning in 1964, and reissued during 2015 with an introduction by Stephen King. King wrote, "They are good stories and can be read simply for pleasure, but what makes them fascinating and takes them to a higher level is their complete (and rather blithe) disregard of genre boundaries."

== Works ==
- Back Home (1931), a ghost play in one act
- Runner in the Snow (1931), a play of the supernatural in one act
- Crystal Clear (1932), a fantasy play
- Ballots for Bill (1933), co-authored by William Ellis Jones
- The Silence of God (1933), a play for Christmas in one act
- Art for Art's Sake (1934)
- The Invisible Clue (1934), written under the name William Milligan
- Gold Stars for Glory (1935)
- To Walk the Night (1937), a science fiction novel with horror elements
- The Edge of Running Water (1939), a science fiction novel with horror elements; adapted as the motion picture The Devil Commands
- Space, Space, Space: Stories About the Time When Men Will Be Adventuring to the Stars (1953), a collection edited by Sloane
- Stories for Tomorrow: An Anthology of Modern Science Fiction (1954), a collection edited by Sloane ISBN 4-87187-302-1
- The Craft of Writing (1979), edited by Julia H. Sloane
