= Hotel for Women =

1939 film by Gregory Ratoff

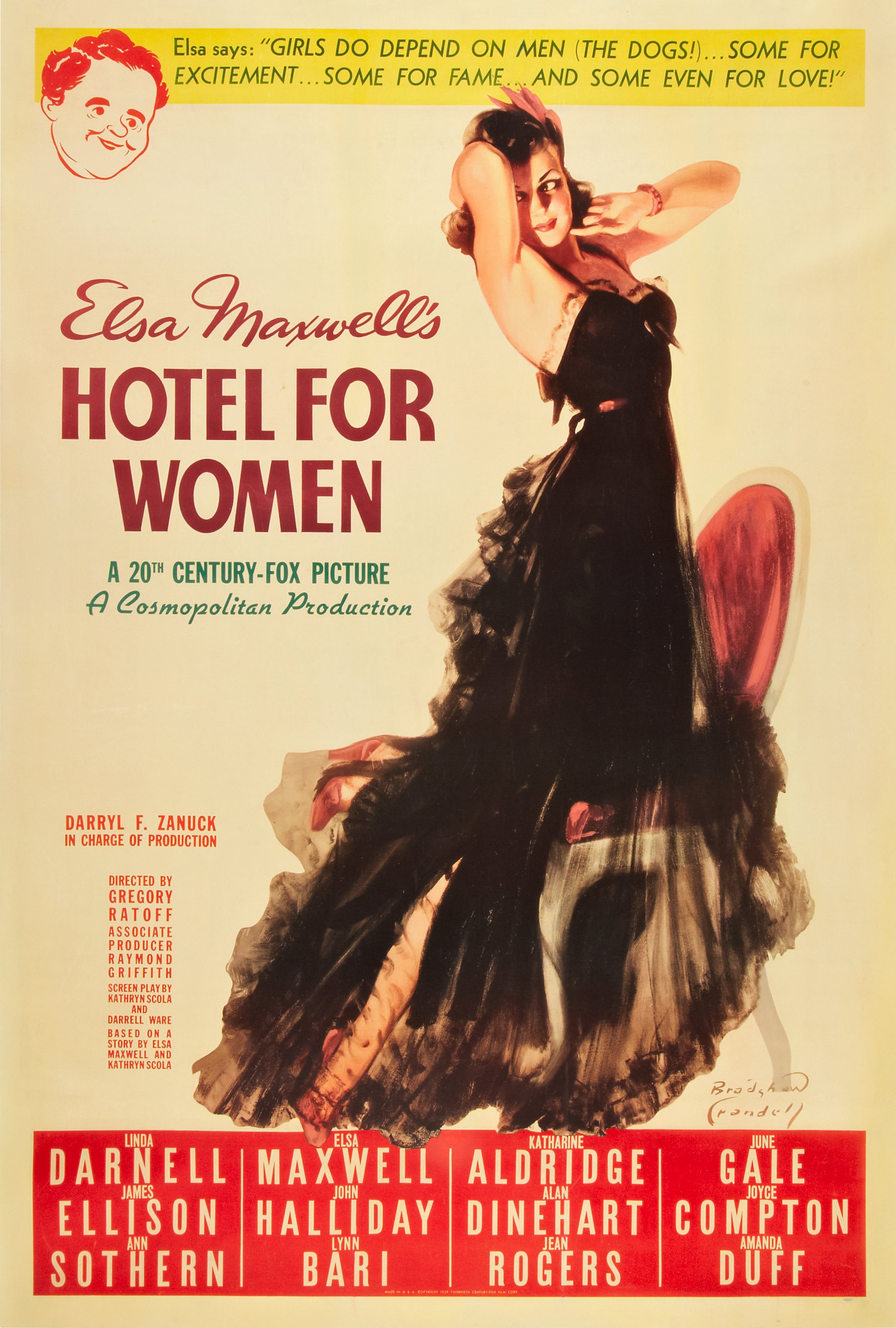
- Poster by Bradshaw Crandell
- Directed by: Gregory Ratoff
- Written by: Elsa Maxwell; Kathryn Scola; Darrell Ware
- Produced by: Raymond Griffith; Darryl F. Zanuck
- Starring: Ann Sothern; Linda Darnell; James Ellison
- Cinematography: J. Peverell Marley
- Edited by: Louis R. Loeffler
- Music by: David Buttolph; Cyril J. Mockridge
- Production company: Cosmopolitan Productions
- Distributed by: 20th Century-Fox
- Release date: August 4, 1939
- Running time: 83 minutes
- Country: United States
- Language: English

Hotel for Women (or Elsa Maxwell's Hotel for Women) is a 1939 American drama film directed by Gregory Ratoff and starring Ann Sothern, Linda Darnell, and James Ellison. It was Darnell's screen debut. As work published in 1939, it will enter the American public domain in 2035 following its renewal in 1967.

== Plot ==
When she is jilted by her boyfriend, a young woman is encouraged to become a model by the women at the hotel where she is staying.

== Cast ==
- Linda Darnell as Marcia Bromley
- James Ellison as Jeff Buchanan
- Ann Sothern as Eileen Connelly
- Jean Rogers as Nancy Prescott
- Lynn Bari as Barbara Hunter
- June Gale as Joan Mitchell
- Joyce Compton as Emeline Thomas
- Elsa Maxwell as Mrs. Tilford
- John Halliday as John Craig
- Kay Aldridge as Melinda Craig
- Alan Dinehart as Stephen Gates
- Sidney Blackmer as McNeil
- Amanda Duff as Receptionist
- Ruth Terry as Craig's Receptionist
- Chick Chandler as Ben Ritchie

== Production ==
The film's sets were designed by the art directors Richard Day and Joseph C. Wright.

== Bibliography ==
- Davis, Ronald L. Hollywood Beauty: Linda Darnell and the American Dream. University of Oklahoma Press, 2014.
