= The Caribbean Mystery =

1945 film by Robert D. Webb

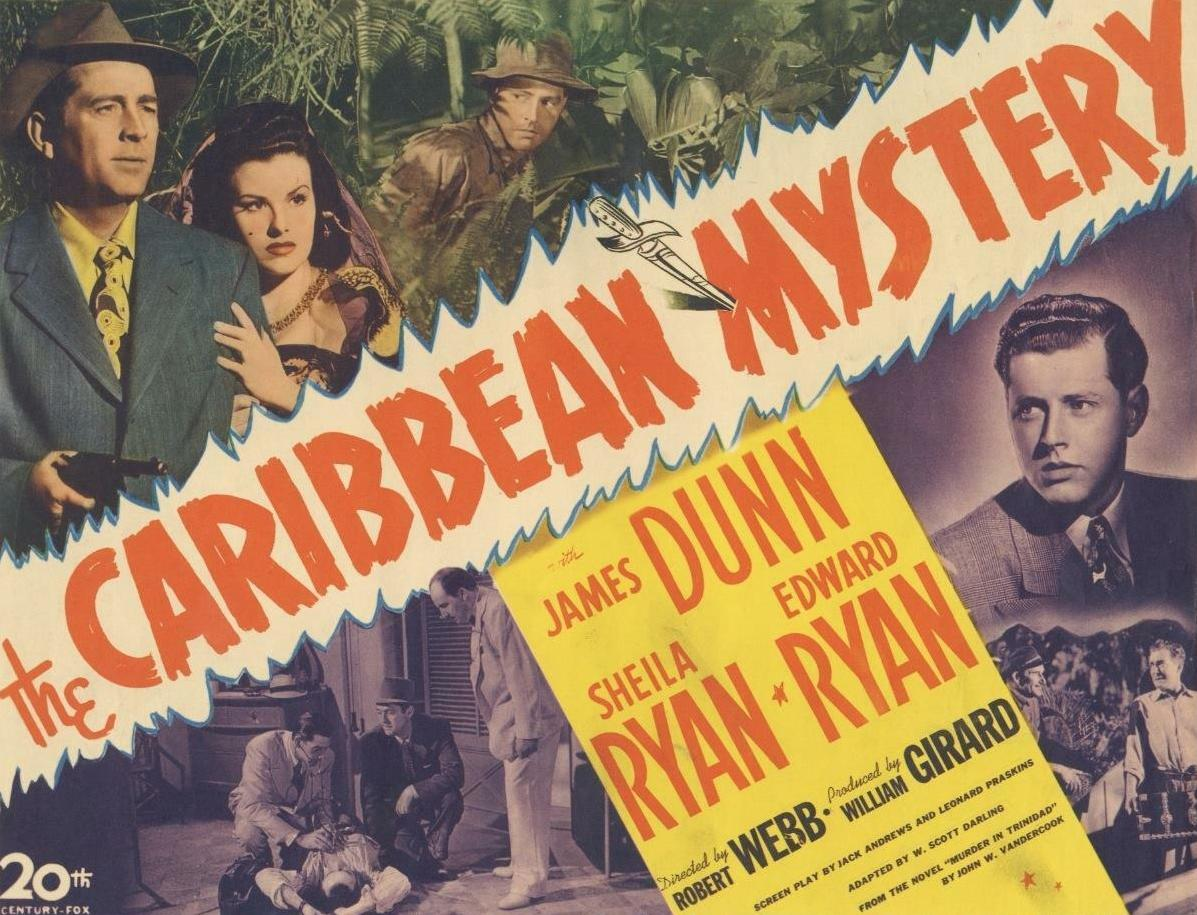
- Lobby card
- Directed by: Robert D. Webb
- Written by: Scott Darling (as W. Scott Darling) (adapted by)
- Screenplay by: Jack Andrews; Leonard Praskins
- Based on: Murder in Trinidad by John W. Vandercook
- Produced by: William Girard
- Starring: James Dunn; Sheila Ryan; Edward Ryan
- Cinematography: Clyde De Vinna
- Edited by: John W. McCafferty
- Music by: David Buttolph
- Color process: Black and white
- Production company: 20th Century Fox
- Distributed by: 20th Century Fox
- Release date: June 1945
- Running time: 65 minutes
- Country: United States
- Language: English

The Caribbean Mystery is a 1945 American film noir mystery film which marked the directorial debut of Robert D. Webb. It is the third film adaptation of the 1933 novel Murder in Trinidad by John W. Vandercook to be produced by 20th Century Fox. Starring James Dunn, Sheila Ryan, and Edward Ryan. the plot finds a Brooklyn detective summoned to a Caribbean island to solve the disappearance of eight geologists who had visited an alligator-infested swamp. The lead role was rewritten especially for Dunn after his successful film comeback in A Tree Grows in Brooklyn (1945), also produced by 20th Century Fox.

== Plot ==
Eight geologists employed by the United Oil Company have disappeared after visiting an alligator-infested swamp in the Caribbean rumored to contain pirate gold. The police commissioner calls in an American detective, Mr. Smith, to solve the case. The island's officials – the governor, the police commissioner, the police lieutenant, and the physician/coroner – are unimpressed with Smith's wise-cracking Brooklyn persona, and Smith in turn makes fun of their belief that quicksand and alligators killed the geologists, especially after he shows them the hole in his hat caused by a bullet he received while touring the swamp. Smith expresses his nervousness over an ornamental dagger displayed in the governor's office. Soon Smith's assistant, Gates, is found dead in his hotel room.

Smith receives an anonymous telephone message telling him to be in his room at midnight. A few minutes before twelve, he hears whistling from the garden, goes to the door, and narrowly misses a dagger being thrown at him. He leaves the dagger in his room to inquire at the reception desk, but when he returns, the dagger is gone. At midnight, Mrs. Jean Gilbert, the hotel's hostess, comes to his room. She tells Smith that Gates had befriended her during his visit and gave her a treasure map to give to Smith should something happen to him. She explains that the swamp completely encircles the island, making it inaccessible to the many who have come over the years to search for pirate gold. Smith escorts her to the hallway and watches her enter her room, then hears a bloodcurdling scream and finds her dead with the same dagger in her heart.

The police commissioner, Colonel Lane, and his daughter Linda appear to have been kidnapped to the island. Smith enlists the help of the governor's son, who is in love with Linda, and they wander in the swamp for two days trying to find the island. To attract attention, Smith fires his pistol; the pair are found and taken to a village run by Captain Van den Bark, who welcomes them and sends them off with his aide who has orders to kill them. Smith manages to wound the aide with his own gun and escapes into the swamp while Van den Bark sends men out to search for them. Meanwhile, Van den Bark and his aide pack up all the pirate gold they have extracted from the swamp and prepare to leave the island. They are caught in the act by Smith, who escapes the dagger-throwing aide and puts him away.

Smith leads Lane, Linda, the governor's son, and Van den Bark out to Van den Bark's launch and prepares to depart. He gives his gun to Lane to stand guard over Van den Bark, but Lane shoots him. Smith pretends that Van den Bark is not fatally wounded, and they return to the administration office. Smith then sets up an elaborate ruse with a doctor at the hospital, having Van den Bark's body placed on a bed in clear sight of the garden. Smith watches from the bushes as all the island officials come to the hospital, and sees the physician/coroner throw a dagger at Van den Bark to kill him. The physician then admits to his own smuggling operation of pirate gold and his murdering the geologists who interfered with it. The case solved, Smith and the governor's son engage in a friendly game of darts.

== Cast ==
- James Dunn as Mr. Smith
- Sheila Ryan as Mrs. Jean Gilbert
- Edward Ryan as Gerald McCracken Jr.
- Jackie Paley as Linda Lane
- Reed Hadley as Dr. Rene Marcel
- Roy Roberts as Capt. Van den Bark
- Richard Shaw as Lt. Bowman Hall
- Daral Hudson as Hartshorn
- William Forrest as Col. Lane
- Roy Gordon as Gov. Gerald McCracken Sr.
- Virginia Walker as Adelaide Marcel

== Production ==
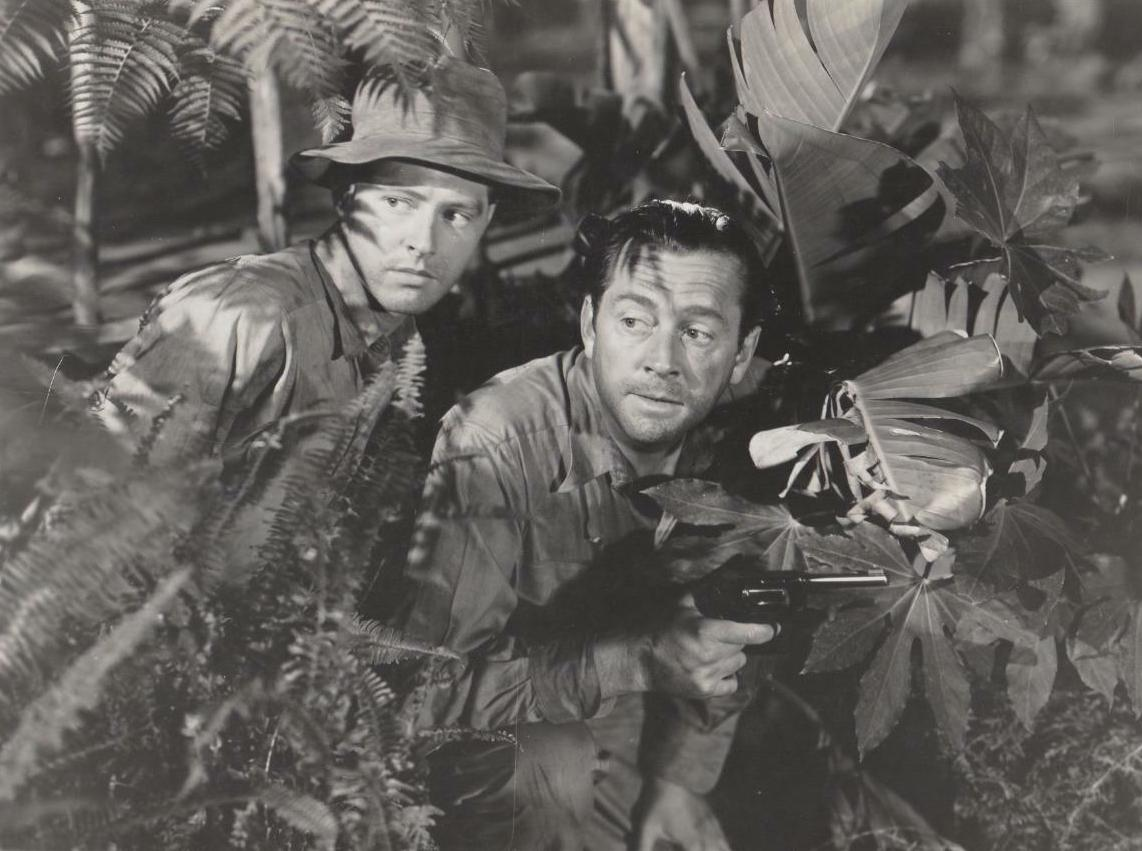
Edward Ryan (l.) and James Dunn in a publicity still

=== Development ===
The Caribbean Mystery was the third film adaptation of the 1933 novel Murder in Trinidad by John W. Vandercook to be produced by 20th Century Fox. The previous versions were 1934's Murder in Trinidad and 1939's Mr. Moto in Danger Island.

The Caribbean Mystery was produced under the working titles Zombies of the Swamp and The Voodoo Mystery. It was the directorial debut for Robert D. Webb, formerly an assistant director at 20th Century Fox.

=== Casting ===
The original script had a lead character named Wyeth, with Reed Hadley slated to play the role. However, studio executives had the role rewritten for James Dunn after seeing the latter's comeback performance in the 1945 film A Tree Grows in Brooklyn. The character was renamed Smith and characterized as a wise-cracking detective from Brooklyn to capitalize on Dunn's association with the latter film. In addition, the script was peppered with references to Brooklyn landmarks and expressions – such as Dunn's character calling himself "a flatfoot from Flatbush" – to reinforce the connection. Dunn reportedly lost 17 lb (7.7 kg) to play the part.

According to an Associated Press report, a 350 lb (160 kg) alligator named Ben was used in the swamp scenes. This marked the 435th film appearance for the reptile, which began appearing in films in 1909, reportedly at the age of 214. The alligator, trained by Tom Reed, earned $100 a day (equivalent to $1,788 in 2025) for its services.

=== Filming ===
Filming took place from mid-January to mid-February 1945.

== Release ==
The Caribbean Mystery was released in September 1945. It had its New York premiere in mid-August.

== Critical reception ==
The Harrisburg Telegraph singled out James Dunn as "the top performer in the cast in his part as the easy-going, wise-guy detective who has his employers wondering how he ever acquired a reputation as a master sleuth". This review also noted "a good deal of suspense and not a few thrills, including a knifing and a few shootings". The Brooklyn Daily Eagle credited Robert Webb's direction for maintaining the suspense, while noting that the film "has very little novelty, … but it is a walloping good murder story".

The Rock Island Argus, however, was unimpressed with Dunn's performance. This review also regretted the swift demise of Sheila Ryan, whom it called the "most attractive member of the cast".

The Philadelphia Inquirer roundly condemned the acting, directing, and screenwriting, categorizing the film as an "amateurish mish-mash about quicksands, killers and buried pirate gold on an unidentified island down in the Caribbean". This review contends that Dunn, who had just made a brilliant comeback in A Tree Grows in Brooklyn, "surely deserved something better", but credits him for taking the film's deficiencies "in stride like the veteran he is".

In a contemporary review, TV Guide gave the film 2 out of 4 stars and called it "A short, taut, well-done thriller".
