= John Vandercook =

American writer

John Womack Vandercook (April 22, 1902 – January 6, 1963) was a British-born American writer of mystery and travel books as well as a radio commentator.

== Early life ==
Son of John Filkin Vandercook, who was the first president of the United Press Association and Margaret Vandercook, a well-known author of children's literature (most notably the Camp Fire Girls series). John W. Vandercook was born in London, where his father was working at the time, but grew up in Delaware County, New York. He graduated from St. Paul's School (New York) in Garden City, Long Island and attended Yale University for one year.

== Professional life ==
In the 1920s, Vandercook worked as a journalist with newspapers including the Columbus, Ohio Citizen, and the Baltimore Post. He was later an assistant editor for Mcfadden Publications and feature editor for New York Graphic.

Vandercook's radio career began in 1940, when he joined National Broadcasting Company. For NBC he covered World War II campaigns in North Africa and Italy. Three days after the D-Day invasion, Vandercook landed in France. He later worked for the American Broadcasting Company radio for several years.

Vandercook's first book was published in 1926. He went to write a dozen more, many of them based on his world travels. Vandercook's 1933 novel Murder in Trinidad was turned into a film of the same title starring Nigel Bruce. Two other movies, 1939's Mr. Moto in Danger Island and 1945's The Caribbean Mystery, were based on his novels.

== Personal life and death ==
Vandercook was married to Margaret Metzger, who died in 1935. He later married Jane H. T. Perry, and they divorced. He married Iris Flynn in New York city on October 31, 1946. He died in Delhi Hospital in Delhi, New York on January 6, 1963.

== Works ==
- Tom-Tom (1926)
- Black Majesty: The Life of Christophe, King of Haiti (1928)
- Murder in Trinidad (1933)
- The Fools' Parade (1930)
- Murder in Fiji (1936)
- Dark Islands (1937)
- Caribbee Cruise, A Book of the West Indies (1938)
- King Cane: An Epic of Sugar (1939)
- Empress of the Dusk; A Life of Theodora of Byzantium (1940)
- Great Sailor: A Life of the Discoverer, Capt. James Cook (1951)
- Murder in Haiti (1956)
- Murder in New Guinea (1959)
