= Mr. Moto =

Fictional Japanese secret agent

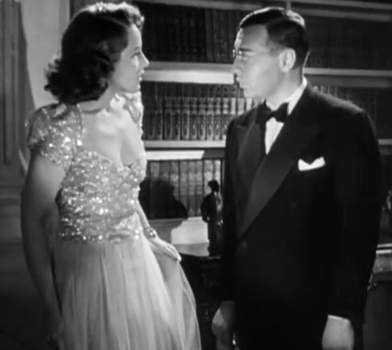
- Peter Lorre as Moto with Jayne Regan in Thank You, Mr. Moto (1937)
- First appearance: Your Turn, Mr. Moto
- Last appearance: Stopover: Tokyo
- Created by: John P. Marquand
- Portrayed by: Peter Lorre; Henry Silva; James Monk

In-universe information
- Gender: Male
- Occupation: Secret agent spy detective
- Nationality: Japanese

Mr. Moto is a fictional Japanese secret agent created in a series of spy and adventure novels by the American author John P. Marquand. He appeared in six novels published between 1935 and 1957, which were set in 1930s China on the eve of the Second Sino-Japanese War. He became even more widely known from Hollywood films and a radio series. Marquand created the character for The Saturday Evening Post, which was seeking stories with an Asian hero after the death of Charlie Chan's creator Earl Derr Biggers.

Although Marquand presented Mr. Moto as a "good guy", later writers objected that he reinforced prevailing racial and ethnic stereotypes. Mr. Moto appeared in other media in ways that are quite different from the novel. Eight motion pictures starred Peter Lorre between 1937 and 1939, 23 radio shows starring James Monks broadcast in 1951, a 1965 film starring Henry Silva, and a 2003 comic book produced by Moonstone Books, later reprinted as Welcome Back, Mr. Moto.

== Character in the novels ==
In Marquand's novels, the character calls himself I.A. Moto, and some other characters believe this to be a fairly obvious alias, since "moto" is usually the second part of a Japanese surname, as in Hashimoto. Though Mr. Moto is shrewd, tough and ruthless against his enemies, to most people in most situations he appears to be a harmless eccentric who sometimes calls himself stupid. The main characters in the novels are Westerners who encounter Mr. Moto in the course of their adventures in exotic lands and gradually come to realize what a formidable character he is.

In the first five novels, set in the era of expansionist Imperial Japan, Mr. Moto is an agent of the empire. In the final novel, set in the 1950s inside Japan, he is a senior intelligence official in the pro-Western Japanese government.

=== Physical description ===
He is physically described in Think Fast, Mr. Moto:

Mr. Moto was a small man, delicate, almost fragile. … He was dressed formally in a morning coat and striped trousers. His black hair was carefully brushed in the Prussian style. He was smiling, showing a row of shiny gold-filled teeth, and as he smiled he drew in his breath with a polite, soft sibilant sound.

This basic description carries through most of the novels, with a slightly different description in Right You Are, Mr. Moto, set 20 years later than the other novels. In this novel he is described as "middle aged", and his hair as being "grayish and close-clipped." In two novels, Marquand describes Mr. Moto's build as "chunky".

He is often described as wearing formal evening clothes that are impeccably tailored. On occasion his sartorial style is somewhat misguided such as in Mr. Moto Is So Sorry when he appears in black-and-white checked sports clothes with green and red golf stockings. When his outfits are commented upon, Mr. Moto makes excuses. In Stopover: Tokyo, he is said to have the imposing dignity of his samurai forebears when dressed in traditional Japanese clothing.

=== Speech ===
In the prewar novels, Moto speaks a faintly comic English, with elaborate 'Oriental'-style politeness, with misuse of the definite and indefinite articles. In Stopover: Tokyo, the final novel, he works directly with U.S. intelligence agents and speaks to them in perfect English.

=== Personal life ===
Mr. Moto rarely discusses his personal life but in Think Fast, Mr. Moto he talks about his many talents.

Yes, I can do many, many things. I can mix drinks and wait on table, and I am a very good valet. I can navigate and manage small boats. I have studied at two foreign universities. I also know carpentry and surveying and five Chinese dialects. So very many things come in useful.

In Mr. Moto Is So Sorry he states that one of the foreign universities was in the United States where he studied anthropology. It is noted in this novel that he has enough knowledge of the United States to distinguish regional accents.

The novels generally involve a romance between the main character (often a disenfranchised expatriate American) and a mysterious woman. While Mr. Moto often despairs of the hero's attempts at saving the girl, he notes in Mr. Moto Is So Sorry that he himself is not immune to their charms.

"So often", he said, "I have seen such gracious ladies disrupt political combinations." He sighed and still stared at the ceiling seemingly lost in memory. "Such a lovely girl in Washington – I was so much younger then. She sold me the navy plans of a submarine. The price was thirty thousand yen. When the blueprints came, they were of a tugboat. Such a lovely lady. Such a lovely lady in Tokyo. She took me to see the goldfish in her garden, and there were the assassins behind the little trees. Not her fault, but theirs that I am still alive – they were such poor shots. I do not understand lovely ladies, but I still trust them sometimes."

=== Politics ===
While he is a devoted servant of the Emperor, he is often at odds with the Japanese military. He believes in the manifest destiny of the Japanese expansion into China, but, unlike the military, wants to achieve this slowly and carefully. Millicent Bell in her biography of John P. Marquand notes how this may have influenced the audience:

There is political significance, too, in the calculated appeal to American readers of the ever resourceful Mr. Moto, the representative of Eastern subtlety combined with Western efficiency, who emerges as a gentleman of wit and charm. This characterization had to survive some anti-Japanese sentiment that followed Japan's invasion of China in 1937. Up to 1939 it may have seemed possible, especially to those Americans unaware of or indifferent to the atrocities of the Japanese military in China, that Japan would be moderate and reasonable in its expansion in the Far East and that the Mr. Motos would defeat the Japanese military fanatics. Pearl Harbor ended American neutrality and American hopes for Japanese moderation, but not before Marquand's Moto series had become one of the most popular fictions ever to be run in an American magazine.

== Novels ==
- Your Turn, Mr. Moto (aka No Hero and Mr. Moto Takes a Hand (British edition)) (1935) – Originally serialized in the Saturday Evening Post in 1935 under the title No Hero.
- Thank You, Mr. Moto (1936) – Originally serialized in the Saturday Evening Post in 1936. An expatriate American gets involved in intrigue in Peking when he tries to save an American woman from unscrupulous art dealers. Moto tries to save them both from a military takeover of Peking.
- Think Fast, Mr. Moto (1937) – Originally serialized in the Saturday Evening Post in 1936. The heir to an American banking firm is sent to Honolulu to clear up a family matter involving a gambling house. Moto is also drawn to Hawaii to stop money being channeled into China to support revolutionaries.
- Mr. Moto Is So Sorry (1938) – Originally serialized in the Saturday Evening Post in 1938. An American on the run from authorities encounters Moto on a train journey through China. Moto is on his way to a life-or-death showdown with Russian spies and draws the hapless American into the situation when a secret message accidentally falls into the possession of a beautiful woman.
- Last Laugh, Mr. Moto (1942) – Originally serialized in Collier's Weekly in 1941 under the title Mercator Island. After Pearl Harbor the character of Moto was "interned for the duration" by the author. This novel, set in the Caribbean, had already been written prior to Pearl Harbor and was published afterward.
- Right You Are, Mr. Moto (aka Stopover: Tokyo and The Last of Mr. Moto) (1957) – This Cold War tale, different in several ways from its predecessors, was originally serialized in the Saturday Evening Post in 1956 and 1957 under the title Rendezvous in Tokyo. The original book was called Stopover: Tokyo and subsequent editions were called The Last of Mr. Moto and finally Right You Are, Mr. Moto.

=== Anthologies/"omnibus" ===
- Mr. Moto's Three Aces (1939) reprints Thank You, Mr. Moto; Think Fast, Mr. Moto; and Mr. Moto Is So Sorry.
- Thank You, Mr. Moto and Mr. Moto Is So Sorry from The Saturday Evening Post, published by The Curtis Publishing Company, Indianapolis, Indiana, 1977
- Mr. Moto: Four Complete Novels (1983) reprints Your Turn, Mr. Moto; Think Fast, Mr. Moto; Mr. Moto Is So Sorry; and Right You Are, Mr. Moto.

== Character in the films ==
Between 1937 and 1939 eight motion pictures were produced by 20th Century Fox starring Peter Lorre as Mr. Kentaro Moto.

Unlike in the novels, Moto is the central character, a detective with Interpol, wears glasses (and has no gold teeth), and is a devout Buddhist (and friendly with the Chinese monarchy). He is impeccably dressed in Western suits. The stories are action-oriented due to Moto's skill with judo (only hinted at in the novels) and due to his tendency to wear disguises.

In early 1938, there was some press talk that Moto would be turned into a Korean due to controversy over Japanese foreign policy, but this did not happen. By April there was talk the series would soon wind up.

=== Abilities ===
In the film Mr. Moto's Last Warning a list is shown which describes him as:

- Age 35–40
- Jiu-jutsu and judo expert
- Uses various disguises
- International police
- Adept at stage illusion/magic
- Usually works alone
- Able to walk silently
- Known to use doubles

Throughout the films, other abilities have been noted:

- Ventriloquism
- Juggling
- Able to speak at least four languages (English, Mandarin, German, and Japanese)
- Devout Buddhist who knows traditional chants and religious rites
- Composes haiku
- Draws caricatures
- Plays the shamisen
- Knows how to cure a hangover

=== Occupation ===
The motion picture Mr. Moto is described as an agent for Interpol.

In the first film, Think Fast, Mr. Moto, he reveals that he is the managing director of the Dai Nippon Trading Company and had decided to investigate the smuggling activities that were harming his business. He claims to be a detective "only as a hobby." In the second film, Thank You, Mr. Moto, the definition of his occupation/hobby begins to get murky. He tells a woman that he is an importer whose hobby is detective work, but only after showing her his identification which indicates he is a Confidential Agent for the International Association of Importers. However, in a climactic chase sequence he flashes a badge at a guard and says that he is from the International Police (understood as Interpol).

In subsequent films Mr. Moto works for private organizations such as the Diamond Syndicate (Danger Island) as well as for world governments (Mr. Moto's Last Warning and Mr. Moto Takes a Chance)-- but only when it is in Japan's interests.

As a member of the International Police, he garners respect from local police around the world. In London, Shanghai, and San Francisco he is given full cooperation for his investigations. In Mr. Moto's Last Warning he works side by side with British Secret Service agents and in Mr. Moto Takes a Chance he is spying for an unknown government agency. He is known for his close relationship to the Chinese Royal Family.

=== Personal life ===
Mr. Moto's personal life is rarely touched upon. In Think Fast, Mr. Moto he tells Bob Hitchings that he went to Stanford University, graduating in 1921 as an honorary member. There, he set a pole vaulting record and was a member of the fraternity Alpha Omega.

In the movies, Mr. Moto travels a great deal and manages to have his cat, Chunkina, along for the journey. Besides his cat, the women in his life include Lela Liu (played by Lotus Long in the film Think Fast, Mr. Moto), a hotel telephone operator whom he asks out on a date, and who proves to be an agent who helps him in his investigation. In Mysterious Mr. Moto, an agent, Lotus Liu (also played by Lotus Long, credited as Karen Sorrell), pretends to fall for his charms so they can be alone to compare notes in their investigation. Like his literary counterpart, Kentaro Moto believes that a "Beautiful girl is only confusing to a man", but has been known to use a woman's emotions to aid his cause. In Thank You, Mr. Moto, he tells the disillusioned Madame Tchernov, "I am so grateful for your suspicious nature. It is not the first time a woman's jealousy has been fatal to the man she loved."

Mr. Moto is charming and polite (even to rude or obnoxious people). He is respectful of other cultures, but sometimes makes wry comments. For instance, in Think Fast, Mr. Moto, he derails the drunken American's party tricks with a little judo. After putting the tipsy Bob Hitchings to bed, he sadly shakes his head and says, "Strange people these Americans."

Mr. Moto's religion is never stated; but in Thank You, Mr. Moto, when his friend Prince Chung (played by Phillip Ahn) dies, it becomes clear Mr. Moto is a devout Buddhist, as he chants expertly before the statue of the Buddha while holding the prince in his arms.

The family crest or mon on Mr. Moto's yukata, as seen in the films Thank You, Mr. Moto and Mr. Moto Takes a Vacation, is three bars in a circle. This is similar to the Maruno uchini mitsuhikiryō (丸の内に三引両), the mon of the Sakuma clan who served under Oda Nobunaga. This would imply that Moto is from a samurai family.

=== Other films ===
A film version of Stopover Tokyo, made in 1957, stars Robert Wagner as an American spy. This film eliminated Moto's character altogether. It disregards the plot of Marquand's novel, and was not a commercial or critical success.

In 1965 Mr. Moto's character was revived in a low-budget Robert Lippert production filmed in England starring Henry Silva. In Mr. Moto Returns, a.k.a. The Return of Mr. Moto, Mr. I.A. Moto is a member of Interpol. The very tall Silva conveyed an almost James Bond-like playboy character; in the fight scenes it is obvious that he is not proficient in martial arts. He speaks in a lazy 'Beatnik' manner. Nowhere in the film is it mentioned that Moto is Japanese. He is referred to as an "Oriental" and, oddly, in the trailer, Moto is referred to as a "swinging Chinese cat". It is only when disguised as a Japanese oil representative, Mr. Takura, that a stereotypical portrayal of a Japanese businessman is given.

== Filmography ==
Title	Star	Director	Released	Plot	Notes	Distributor
Think Fast, Mr. Moto	Peter Lorre	Norman Foster	1937	Mr. Moto works to stop a secret smuggling operation.	Based on Marquand's novel of the same name.	20th Century Fox
Thank You, Mr. Moto	Peter Lorre	Norman Foster	1937	In disguise again as a Mongolian trader in the Gobi desert, Moto makes his way to Peking where he tries to obtain ancient scrolls that lead the way to the treasure of Genghis Khan. At the end, he fulfills an obligation to his dying friend and destroys the scrolls so no one can ever violate the treasure.	Loosely based on Marquand's novel of the same name.	20th Century Fox
Mr. Moto's Gamble (aka Mr. Moto's Diary)	Peter Lorre	James Tinling	1938	Moto is now famous enough as a detective to be giving a class in criminology in San Francisco. While at a boxing match, Moto is drawn into a murder investigation.	Originally intended for the Charlie Chan series starring Warner Oland; re-written to make it a Moto film, but Keye Luke, as Chan's son Lee, remained.	20th Century Fox
Mr. Moto Takes a Chance	Peter Lorre	Norman Foster	1938	Undercover as an archeologist in Thailand, Moto is trying to learn who is heading a revolutionary army smuggling guns and explosives into the tiny village of Tong Moi.	Original story.	20th Century Fox
Mysterious Mr. Moto	Peter Lorre	Norman Foster	1938	Posing as a Japanese murderer, Moto escapes from Devil's Island with a member of the League of Assassins to find out not only who is their next victim but to identify the mysterious man at the top.	Original story.	20th Century Fox
Mr. Moto's Last Warning	Peter Lorre	Norman Foster	1939	In Port Said, Egypt, Moto tries to stop the French Naval Fleet from being destroyed by secret agents bent on starting a war between the British and the French.	Original story.	20th Century Fox
Mr. Moto in Danger Island	Peter Lorre	Herbert I. Leeds	1939	Diamond smugglers are working out of Puerto Rico and Moto is sent to investigate and discover their secret lair.	Based on the novel Murder in Trinidad by John W. Vandercook	20th Century Fox
Mr. Moto Takes a Vacation	Peter Lorre	Norman Foster	1939	While pretending to be vacationing in San Francisco, Moto is actually keeping an eye on the crown of the Queen of Sheba, surefire bait for the master thief known as Metaxa.	Original story.	20th Century Fox
The Return of Mr. Moto	Henry Silva	Ernest Morris	1965	Moto leaves his Hawaiian home to solve a case in London involving an ex-Nazi.	Original story.	20th Century Fox

== Character in the radio program ==
From May to October 1951, the NBC Radio Network produced and aired 23 half-hour episodes starring James Monks as Mr. I.A. Moto, international secret agent. Mr. Moto is an American of Japanese descent born in San Francisco but retaining his international connections.

The show focused on Mr. Moto's fight against Communism although occasionally he solved more mundane mysteries such as murder and blackmail.

=== Radio program episode list ===
1. A Force Called X07 – aired May 20, 1951
2. Smoke Screen – aired May 27, 1951
3. Blackmail – aired June 3, 1951
4. The Dead Land – aired June 10, 1951
5. The Kurlioff Papers (broadcast on the West Coast) – aired June 13, 1951 and The Bazaloff Papers (broadcast on the East Coast) – aired June 17, 1951
6. The Victim – aired June 24, 1951
7. Project 77 – aired July 1, 1951
8. Sabotage – aired July 8, 1951
9. Escape – aired July 15, 1951
10. The Wheel of Life
11. The Yellow Robe or the Lama's Amah
12. The Voronzoff Necklace
13. Waltzing Matilda
14. The Beauty and the Avenger
15. The Shen Tsung Fan
16. The Three Numbers
17. The Unhappy Firebug
18. The Blue Cigarettes
19. The Kants of Kailuaneohe
20. The Schraum Method – aired Oct. 1, 1951
21. The Crooked Log – aired Oct. 7, 1951
22. The Strange Elopement of Professor Sloan – aired Oct. 13, 1951
23. The Dry Martini – aired Oct. 20, 1951

=== Parodies and satires ===
Peter Lorre brought the character of Mr. Moto to many comedy radio programs.

- Camel Caravan Oct. 24, 1938 on CBS. Eddie Cantor, host. Peter Lorre as Mr. Moto investigates the disappearance of guest Martha Raye.

- Royal Gelatin Hour Aug. 10, 1939 on NBC. Rudy Vallée, host. Peter Lorre as Mr. Moto in a mystery sketch.

- George Jessel's Celebrity Program Aug. 16, 1939 on NBC. George Jessel, host. Peter Lorre as Mr. Moto in a mystery sketch.

- Texaco Star Theater Oct. 4, 1939 on CBS. Ken Murray, host. Peter Lorre as Mr. Moto in a mystery sketch.

- Texaco Star Theater Jan. 3, 1943 on CBS. Fred Allen, host. Peter Lorre as Mr. Moto in "The Missing Shot or Who Killed Balsam Beamish?" Mr. Moto vs. One Long Pan.

- Texaco Star Theater June 4, 1944 on CBS. Fred Allen, host. Peter Lorre as Mr. Moto in "More Murder on the Fred Allen Program."

- Porky's Movie Mystery (1939) Features Porky Pig as the detective "Mr. Motto."

The slangy and whimsical song "Java Jive", a 1940 song by Milton Drake and Ben Oakland that was a standard for the Ink Spots, namechecks the detective in a nonsensical couplet: "I love java, sweet and hot / Whoops Mister Moto, I'm a coffee pot".

The Bel-Airs, an early and influential surf rock band, are best known for their 1961 instrumental hit "Mr. Moto" which has been covered by a variety of other muscians and bands such as The Ventures and Agent Orange

The character of Joe Jitsu from The Dick Tracy Show was based on Mr. Moto.

== See also ==
- Portrayal of East Asians in Hollywood
- Charlie Chan
- Mr. Wong
