= Thank You, Mr. Moto (novel) =

Novel by John P. Marquand

- First edition
- Author: John P. Marquand
- Language: English
- Series: Mr Moto
- Genre: Spy, Adventure novel
- Publisher: Little Brown & Co
- Publication date: 1936
- Publication place: United States
- Media type: Print
- Pages: 278
- Preceded by: Your Turn, Mr. Moto
- Followed by: Think Fast, Mr. Moto

Thank You, Mr. Moto, is a novel of spy fiction by John P. Marquand. It was originally published in serial form in the Saturday Evening Post from February 8 to March 14, 1936, and was first published in book form on 15 May 1936.

It is the second of six Mr. Moto novels and can also be found in the omnibus Mr. Moto's Three Aces published in 1939.

The Moto novels are set in the Orient, which in the 1930s was still considered mysterious and exotic. Mr. Moto is an Imperial spy for the Japanese government and often has to deal with people who accidentally get involved in his work.

== Plot summary ==
An expatriate American, Tom Nelson, has been living in Beiping (modern day Beijing) for some time and believes that he understands the Oriental mind. When he meets Eleanor Joyce he thinks that she is getting involved in matters way over her head when she agrees to meet with Major Jamison Best, a British ex-Army officer who sells stolen Chinese artifacts and art treasures.

After dinner with Best, Nelson tries to make sense of Best's cryptic conversation concerning a Chinese bandit chief named Wu Lo Feng and the possibility of trouble brewing in the city. On leaving dinner, he runs into Joyce whom he tries to persuade to not get involved in any scheme Best has going. She doesn't listen to him but later he finds her wandering around outside of Best's house, distraught.

The next day Major Best is found dead, killed by a bolt from a Chinese crossbow. Mr. Moto is investigating the murder and he tells Nelson not to get involved. Nelson doesn't listen to him and goes to warn Joyce since she was the last to see Best alive. Nelson soon discovers that Moto has made Best's murder seem like a suicide.

When he returns home someone tries to kill Nelson with a Chinese crossbow. Moto arrives and Nelson thinks he is the murderer. Cool and calm despite having a gun pointed at him, Moto once again warns Nelson not to interfere and offers him a chance to escape Peking on the next steamer. When Moto leaves, Nelson discovers that Wu Lo Feng is there ready to kill him.

After escaping, Nelson goes to Joyce's hotel to convince her to leave. She refuses and Nelson sees that she has an ancient Chinese scroll that Best mentioned and that a curio dealer, Pu had offered to him.

Nelson and Joyce take the scroll to Prince Tung, a friend of Nelson's. Nelson discovers that Joyce is a museum buyer sent to Peking to buy a set of eight ancient scrolls. Tung is shocked to discover that someone has promised all eight scrolls to Joyce since seven of them are in his private vault. The situation becomes dire when Wu's men arrive and kidnap Nelson, Joyce and Tung. Soon after they arrive at their prison, an abandoned temple, Mr. Moto is brought in as yet another prisoner. Moto explains the situation to them.

A rival military faction in Japan believes that their country is not advancing fast enough. These militant Japanese led by Mr. Takahara have hired Wu Lo Feng to cause a military disturbance in the city. Major Best was to raise money for the campaign by selling the eight scrolls that were stolen from Prince Tung. Best double-crossed Wu by selling information to Mr. Moto, and so was killed.

Wu Lo Feng arrives with Takahara to finalize their plans for the uprising. Nelson, Tung and Moto are certain to be killed but are philosophical about their plight. However, Joyce makes an unexpected move and grabs Wu's gun. They all escape after tying up Takahara and Wu. Moto organizes the police to stop the uprising and they all retire to Nelson's home. Tung admonishes Nelson for not killing Wu since he is sure to retaliate. When Moto arrives he admits that he liquidated both Takahara and Wu to guarantee everyone's safety. They all profusely thank Mr. Moto.

== Characters ==
- Tom Nelson – An American lawyer who has been living in Peking for several years.
- Eleanor Joyce – An American museum buyer who had traveled to Peking to acquire a set of eight ancient silk scrolls depicting the landscape of China.
- Mr. Moto – a Japanese Secret Service agent.
- Prince Tung – a friend of Nelson's, who is descended from an old Manchu family.
- Major Jamison Best – A British ex-military man who is in Peking to sell Chinese art and artifacts.
- Wu Lo Feng – A Chinese bandit chief who, for the right price, will use his army to create chaos in Peking.
- Takahara – A militant Japanese politician who wants to see Japan advance into China at a faster rate.

== Themes ==
Marquand's Moto books are all generally about a clash of cultures between Asia and the West. In this novel, however, Nelson represents both the American and the Chinese way of thinking. Written in the first person from his point of view, Nelson admires the Chinese but is constantly reminded that he will never be part of their culture. Sometimes Nelson is praised by this Chinese friend Prince Tung for displaying the proper Chinese way of acting, and sometimes he is chastised for being too illogical, too Western. However, it was Eleanor Joyce's highly illogical action of grabbing the bandit's gun that ultimately saves their lives.

Nelson and Joyce's romance and the Chinese scrolls are just minor complications set against the larger backdrop of Sino-Japanese relations. Moto, as a conservative member of the Japanese Government, is there to see that Japan advances at a slow and reasonable rate. Takahara represents the more militant Japanese who do not mind leaving chaos in their wake.

But, the ever-polite Moto wants to maintain a balance between the old and the new. In one scene Prince Tung, representing China's past and Mr. Moto, representing its future, politely share a cup of tea. Nelson, the Western outsider, watches from a distance but doesn't participate.

Americans at the time may have been uncertain about the Japanese expansion into China but Marquand gives Moto the opportunity to defend the actions of his country:

A disturbance happens, anywhere in China, and my nation is always blamed for it. It is hard; very, very hard. Did not your own great country seize a large part of Mexico in the past century, Mr. Nelson? And what of Britain's colonizing efforts? The British Empire has always held out a helping hand to distressed and backward nations. Yet if my own poor country tries in the most altruistic way to settle even the smallest Chinese difficulty, there are notes of protest and inflammatory passages in the press.

Ultimately, however, Mr. Moto is a decent man who goes out of his way to make sure the Americans remain safe.

The historian Michael Schneider observed that Mr. Moto novels show Japanese expansionism in a light that might appeal to many Americans and Mr. Moto as a “moderate” in the spectrum of Japanese politics. Chinese culture is shown as ancient and exotic, but Schneider concludes that it is "difficult to see the novels as doing anything more than buttressing prevailing racial and ethnic stereotypes."

== Reception ==
The novel was praised for its "vitality and vividness" and "swift action".

== Film adaptation ==
This novel was used as the basis for the movie Thank You, Mr. Moto starring Peter Lorre and produced in 1937 by 20th Century Fox. The film is only loosely based on the novel, retaining only a few character names and very little of the overall plot.
