= Berenice Wyer =

American classical composer

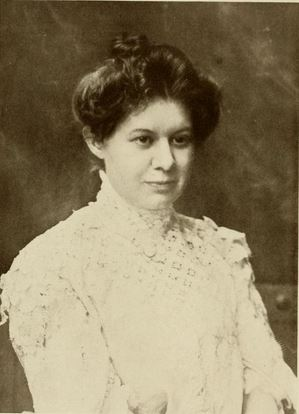
- Photo from Notable Women of St. Louis, 1914, credited to Kajiwara
- Born: Annie Berenice Crumb; October 5, 1873; North Windham, Connecticut, United States
- Died: January 29, 1960 (aged 86); Brookline, Massachusetts
- Education: Forest Park University, Hosmer Hall
- Known for: pianist, musical compositions
- Notable work: Paolo and Francesca from Stephen Phillips, "The Sky Above The Roofing Lies" from Paul Verlaine and "Tropic Memories" from Charles Baudelaire
- Spouse: Harry Gage Wyer

Annie Berenice Crumb Wyer (October 5, 1873 – January 29, 1960) was an American pianist, composer, and lecturer. Wyer composed for both piano and organ, and wrote art song and works for violin. She collaborated with Ethan Allen Taussig in performances of spoken recitation accompanied by the piano.

== Early life ==
Annie Berenice Crumb was born in North Windham, Connecticut, on October 5, 1873, to Ellen V. (née Peck) and Desevignè Starks Crumb, but spent most of her childhood in Missouri.

Crumb attended successively Forest Park University and Hosmer Hall (under Louise McNair), her musical education during all this time being under the guidance of Ernest Kroeger, and included piano playing, harmony, counterpoint, and exercises in writing in the strict forms, including canon and fugue. She then supplemented her education in later years by a systematic study of musical form, history, biography and folklore music.

After five years of study in St. Louis, Crumb went to New York, where she became one of two pupils of Franz Rummel, one of the greatest pianists of his day. When Rummel traveled to Holland and Germany for a concert tour, she went to Boston and became a pupil of Carl Baermann, a leading pianist and teacher.

== Career ==
After four years of studying under Baermann, Berenice Crumb made her debut at Steinert Hall in Boston, giving a piano recital. The critics were unanimous in recognizing her work as that of a high-class artist, including an old friend of Baermann, who had initially refused an invitation to attend as he "never listen[ed] to pupils' recitals", but was ultimately persuaded to come and later informed Baermann, "This young lady is a genius. I kiss her finger tips." A tour abroad followed the recital in Boston, with a year's study under Heinrich Barth in Berlin.

In May 1904, Wyer performed at the piano at the General Federation of Women's Club, in St. Louis.

In 1911 Wyer lectured before the Piano Club of Kirkwood and gave lecture recitals in St. Louis. In addition to piano performances, she collaborated with Ethan Allen Taussig in performances of spoken recitation accompanied by the piano. Their repertoire included several of the best known works in this field, including Richard Strauss's melodrama Enoch Arden for narrator and piano—the piece that inspired Wyer to create her own works in this genre—as well as shorter works such as "King Robert of Sicily", "The Witches' Song", and "Bergliot". Wyer's first such composition was Miles Standish, using the text by Henry Wadsworth Longfellow. It was initially advertised as being a new work by "Felix Weidelmann", but Wyer's authorship was revealed during its premiere. The work's success was such that the pair was soon invited to perform at the St. Louis College Club, Shurtleff College (Alton), the Wednesday Club, and for an entertainment in honor of the National Federation of Women's Clubs.

Wyer set the tragedy Paolo and Francesca by Stephen Phillips—based on the historical characters of Francesca da Rimini and her lover and married brother-in-law, Paolo Malatesta—to music in 1914; she characterized the composition as a "Cantillation for Reader with Piano accompaniment", and also incorporated three songs for baritone. It was subsequently produced in New York and Chicago, among other venues. This work, like her earlier "Miles Standish", was built upon the leitmotif idea, with each principal character being given a musical phrase, which recurs under different guises as the emotions vary in the progress of the story.

Wyer also composed for both piano and organ, as well as works for violin and for voice and piano. As of 1922, they were unpublished. Her solo piano compositions included "Concert Etude in D flat", the ballades "Chivalric Poem" and "Of Romance", and a Ballade in C-sharp minor that won the Prize for a Piano Composition in the 1916 St. Louis Art League Music Competition; organ works included "Etude in D minor", "Lento Assai", and "Meditation". Her works for violin included "Serenade", "Spring Fantasie", and "Twilight in the Garden". Wyer's art songs with piano accompaniment encompassed "I Have a Rendezvous With Death", "Requiescat", "To Ships", "Remembrance", "The Mocking Bird", plus a setting from Paul Verlaine's "The Sky Above the Roofing Lies" and one from Charles Baudelaire's "Tropic Memories".

== Personal life and family ==
Back home from her European tour, on June 11, 1901, Berenice Crumb married Dr. Harry Gage Wyer (June 27, 1870, Woburn, Massachusetts – January 15, 1961, Brookline, Massachusetts), the son of Edwin F. Wyer and Abbie A. Farrar, of Kirkwood, Missouri. Dr. Wyer was a general practitioner who first attended Phillips Academy, Andover and then graduated from Harvard Medical School (class 1896, A.B.; M.D. 1900), and was a resident at St. Louis's hospital. Crumb and Wyer met in Boston while attending college, and after finishing her musical course in Boston she returned to St. Louis to do concert work for two years. Wyer followed her and they married in St. Louis. They had three children, Beatrice (later Holder), born June 1902; Richard F., born November 1904 (Harvard, Class of 1928); and Harold E. (November 13, 1913 – December 21, 2013) (Bowdoin College, Class of 1937).

The Wyers were living in Brookline, Massachusetts, when Berenice died on January 29, 1960.

During World War I, Harry Gage Wyer became an Army Medical Corps Major as surgeon. After the war, Dr. Wyer went to work at William Beaumont Hospital, El Paso, Texas. Wyer was Professor of Military Science and Tactics at Harvard Medical School in 1927, giving courses on medicomilitary subjects for students who were candidates for the Medical Officers Reserve Corps. In 1941 Dr. Wyer was professor of Medico-Military Science at University of Vermont. In 1941, Maj. Harry Gage Wyer, who at 71 years old was one of the Army's oldest company commanders, received the praise of his superior officer for the "fine spirit which has fired American medical officers since the war independence." Wyer, who at the time was living in Brookline, returned to active duty for World War II when Army examiners reported him fit. He became a commander of Company B, declining an office assignment. He ended the war as Lieutenant Colonel.

The Harold and Faith Wyer Scholarship Fund, established in 2007 in support of scholarships to Bowdoin undergraduates, was founded by Judith L. Wyer (died 2013), in honor of her parents, Harold and Faith B. Wyer (1918–2009). Harold Wyer was a commercial broadcaster and while in the U.S. Navy during World War II was a member of the Naval Reserve Radio Division. Later he worked for General Electric Co. and Bethlehem Steel Co.
