= John P. Marquand =

American novelist (1893–1960)

- Born: John Phillips Marquand; November 10, 1893; Wilmington, Delaware, U.S.
- Died: July 16, 1960 (aged 66); Newburyport, Massachusetts, U.S.
- Education: Harvard University (BA)
- Occupation: Novelist
- Spouses: Christina Sedgwick (m. 1922; div. 1935) Adelaide Hooker (m. 1937; div. 1958)
- Children: 5
- Writing career
- Pen name: J.P. Marquand

John Phillips Marquand (November 10, 1893 – July 16, 1960) was an American writer. Originally best known for his Mr. Moto spy stories (starting with Your Turn, Mr. Moto in 1935), he achieved popular success and critical respect for his satirical novels, winning a Pulitzer Prize for The Late George Apley in 1938. One of his abiding themes was the confining nature of life in America's upper class and among those who aspired to join it. Marquand treated those whose lives were bound by these unwritten codes with a characteristic mix of respect and satire.

== Early life and education ==
Marquand was born on November 10, 1893, in Wilmington, Delaware, the son of Philip Marquand and his wife Margaret née Fuller. His mother was a great-niece of 19th-century transcendentalist and feminist Margaret Fuller. Marquand was also a cousin of Buckminster Fuller. He grew up in Newburyport, Massachusetts, where his forebears had lived, raised by his three maiden aunts, while his parents lived in a number of other cities as his father pursued his career.

Marquand attended Newburyport High School, where he won a scholarship that enabled him to attend Harvard College, where his family had a long tradition of attendance. As an impecunious public school graduate in the heyday of Harvard's Gold Coast, however, he was seen as an unclubbable outsider.

After being turned down by the Harvard Crimson, Harvard's student newspaper, Marquand succeeded in being elected to the editorial board of the humor magazine, the Harvard Lampoon.

== Career ==
=== Boston Evening Transcript ===
After graduating from Harvard in 1915, Marquand was hired by The Boston Evening Transcript, working initially as a reporter and later on the Transcript's bi-weekly magazine section.

=== World War I ===
While he was a student at Harvard, Marquand joined Battery A of the Massachusetts National Guard, which, in 1916, was activated. In July 1916, Marquand was sent to the Mexican border. Later, like many of his classmates, he served in World War I, where he was engaged in combat in France.

=== Writing career ===
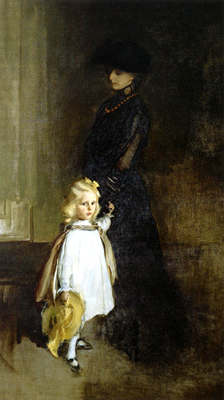
Mrs. Alexander Sedgwick and Daughter Christina, a 1902 portrait by Cecilia Beaux

Marquand's life and work reflected his ambivalence about American society and especially the power of its old-line elites. Being rebuffed by fashionable Harvard did not discourage his social aspirations. In 1922, he married Christina Sedgwick, niece of Atlantic Monthly editor Ellery Sedgwick. In 1925, Marquand published his first book, Lord Timothy Dexter, an exploration of the life and legend of 18th-century Newburyport eccentric Timothy Dexter (1763–1806).

By the mid-1930s, he was a prolific and successful writer of fiction for slick magazines like the Saturday Evening Post. Some of these short stories were of an historical nature as had been Marquand's first two novels, The Unspeakable Gentleman and The Black Cargo, which were later characterized by Marquand as "costume fiction", to which he stated that an author "can only approximate provided he has been steeped in the tradition". By the mid-1930s, Marquand abandoned "costume fiction".

In the late 1930s, Marquand began producing a series of novels on the dilemmas of class, most of which centered on New England, and some of which were partially set in Clyde, Massachusetts, a fictional seaside community based strongly on Marquand's home town of Newburyport.

The first of these novels, The Late George Apley (1937), a satire of Boston's upper class, won the Pulitzer Prize for the Novel in 1938. Other Marquand novels exploring New England and class themes include Wickford Point (1939), H.M. Pulham, Esquire (1941), and Point of No Return (1949). The last is especially notable for its satirical portrayal of Harvard anthropologist W. Lloyd Warner, whose Yankee City study attempted (and in Marquand's view, dismally failed) to describe and analyze the manners and mores of Newburyport.

Marquand was a part-time war correspondent during World War II. The war's huge impact on American citizens and families is an element in his later novels. Several characters in these novels are motivated by a sense of duty to aid the war effort, though they are past draft age and unsure of the value of their contribution.

For all of his ambivalence about America's elite, Marquand ultimately succeeded in joining it and in embodying its characteristics. He forgave the upper crust classmates who snubbed him as a Harvard student, relationships he satirized in H.M. Pulham, Esq and The Late George Apley. He was invited to join all the prestigious social clubs in Boston, including Tavern and Somerset, and those in New York City, including the Century Association.

Through his second marriage to Adelaide Ferry Hooker, he became linked to the Rockefeller family. Her sister, Blanchette, was married to John D. Rockefeller III. He maintained luxury homes in Newburyport and in the Caribbean.

== Personal life ==
Marquand was married twice and had five children. He married Christina Sedgwick in 1922, and they had two children: son John Jr and daughter Christina Jr. Marquand and Sedgwick divorced in 1935. The following year, Marquand married Adelaide Ferry Hooker, a descendant of Connecticut Colony founder Thomas Hooker. They had three children together, two sons and a daughter, before divorcing in 1958.

== Death ==
On July 16, 1960, Marquand died in Newburyport, Massachusetts, of a heart attack in his sleep at the age of 66. He is buried in Sawyer Hill Burying Ground in Newburyport.

== Novels ==
=== Mr Moto novels ===
- No Hero. Boston, Little Brown, 1935; as Mr. Moto Takes a Hand, London, Hale, 1940; as Your Turn, Mr. Moto, New York, Berkley, 1963
- Thank You, Mr. Moto. Boston, Little Brown, 1936; London, Jenkins, 1937
- Think Fast, Mr. Moto. Boston, Little Brown, 1937; London, Hale, 1938
- Mr. Moto Is So Sorry. Boston, Little Brown, 1938; London, Hale, 1939
- Last Laugh, Mr. Moto. Boston, Little Brown, 1942; London, Hale, 1943
- Stopover Tokyo. Boston, Little Brown, and London, Collins, 1957; as The Last of Mr. Moto, New York, Berkley, 1963; as Right You Are, Mr. Moto, New York, Popular Library, 1977

=== Other crime novels ===
- Ming Yellow. Boston, Little Brown, and London, Lovat Dickson, 1935
- Don't Ask Questions. London, Hale, 1941
- It's Loaded, Mr. Bauer. London, Hale, 1949

=== Literary novels ===
- The Unspeakable Gentleman. New York, Scribner, and London, Hodder and Stoughton, 1922
- The Black Cargo. New York, Scribner, and London, Hodder and Stoughton, 1925
- Warning Hill. Boston, Little Brown, 1930.
- The Late George Apley. Boston, Little Brown, 1937
- Wickford Point. Boston, Little Brown, 1939
- H.M. Pulham, Esq.. Boston, Little Brown, and London, Hale, 1942
- So Little Time. Boston, Little Brown, 1943; London, Hale, 1944
- Repent in Haste. Boston, Little Brown, 1945
- B.F.'s Daughter. Boston, Little Brown, 1946; as Polly Fulton, London, Hale, 1947
- Point of No Return. Boston, Little Brown, and London, Hale, 1949
- Melville Goodwin, USA. Boston, Little Brown, 1951; London, Hale, 1952
- Sincerely, Willis Wayde. Boston, Little Brown, and London, Hale, 1955
- Women and Thomas Harrow. Boston, Little Brown, 1958; London, Collins, 1959

The Late George Apley, Wickford Point, H.M. Pulham, Esquire, So Little Time, Repent in Haste and B.F.'s Daughter were published as Armed Services Editions during World War II.

Do Tell Me, Doctor Johnson was privately printed in small numbers, 1928 (one story, 47 pages). A search of the Readers' Guide to Periodical Literature indicates that Marquand had 111 short stories published in various magazines, mostly in the Saturday Evening Post, from 1921 through 1947, of which 18 appear in Four of a Kind, Haven's End and Thirty Years.

=== Collections and short stories ===
- Four of a Kind, 1923
- Haven's End. Boston, Little Brown, 1933; London, Hale, 1938
- Thirty Years, 1954
- Life at Happy Knoll, 1957
