= Henry Sharp (cinematographer) =

American cinematographer

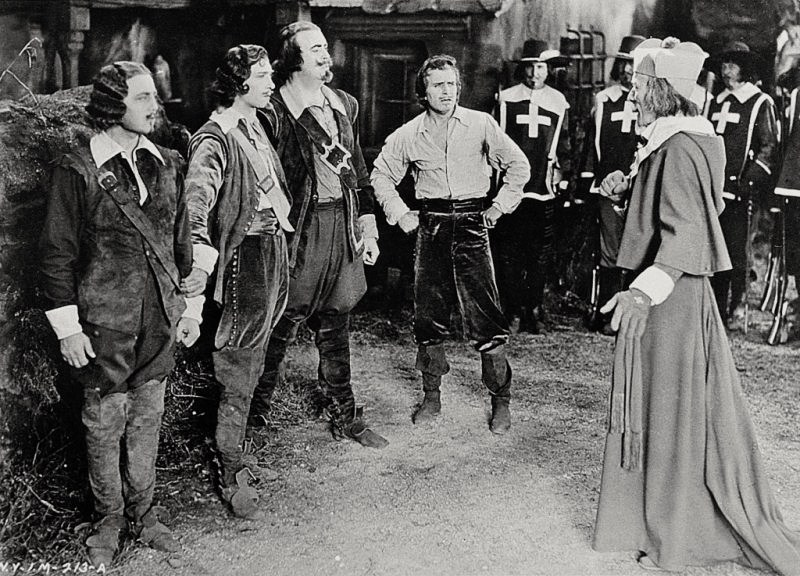
- Born: Henry Thomas Sharp; May 13, 1892; Los Angeles, California, U.S.
- Died: August 6, 1966 (aged 74); Los Angeles, California, U.S.
- Occupation: Cinematographer
- Spouse: Jean Thayer (m. 1937)

Henry Sharp was an American cinematographer who worked in Hollywood from the 1920s through the 1950s. He was known for his work with actor Douglas Fairbanks.

== Biography ==
Sharp was born in Los Angeles, California, to Thomas Sharp and Charlotte Bailey. He began working as a cinematographer by 1920, and by 1930, had become Douglas Fairbanks' cameraman of choice. He accompanied Fairbanks on a trip around the world, filming their travels. He was in a plane crash in 1935 in Missouri which put him in the hospital for three months. After he recovered he married his nurse, Jean Thayer.

== Selected filmography ==
- Homespun Folks (1920)
- The Hottentot (1922)
- The Third Alarm (1922)
- Soul of the Beast (1923)
- Judgment of the Storm (1924)
- The Marriage Cheat (1924)
- A Girl of the Limberlost (1924)
- Barbara Frietchie (1924)
- While the City Sleeps (1928)
- Brotherly Love (1928)
- The Sins of the Children (1930)
- The Murder Trial of Mary Dugan (1931)
- The Strange Case of Clara Deane (1932)
- The Devil Is Driving (1932)
- Song of the Eagle (1933)
- The Lemon Drop Kid (1934)
- The Accusing Finger (1936)
- Campus Confessions (1938)
- His Exciting Night (1938)
- Sudden Money (1939)
- Dr. Cyclops (1940)
- Broadway Limited (1941)
- Henry Aldrich, Editor (1942)
- The Hidden Hand (1942)
- The Mysterious Doctor (1943)
- Ministry of Fear (1944)
- National Barn Dance (1944)
- Tomorrow, the World! (1944)
- The Man in Half Moon Street (1945)
- What Next, Corporal Hargrove? (1945)
- Woman Who Came Back (1945)
- The Glass Alibi (1946)
- The Fabulous Suzanne (1946)
- It Happened on Fifth Avenue (1947)
- High Tide (1947)
- Perilous Waters (1948)
- Strike It Rich (1948)
- Daughter of the West (1949)
- The Lawton Story (1949)
- Wonder Valley (1953)
- The Young Land (1959)
