= Don Castle =

American actor (1917–1966)

- Born: September 29, 1917; Beaumont, Texas, U.S.
- Died: May 26, 1966 (aged 48); Hollywood, California, U.S.
- Resting place: Chapel Of The Pines Crematory
- Occupation: Actor
- Years active: 1938-1957

Don Castle (Born Marion Goodman, Jr. September 29, 1917 – May 26, 1966) was an American film actor of the 1930s, 40s & 50s.

== Biography ==
Son of Marion Emanuel Goodman Sr. and Lucille Jeantelle-Viterbo, Castle was born in Beaumont, Texas. He went to the University of Texas where he was roommates with Jack Wrather.

Castle’s resemblance to Clark Gable started his acting career as a stage actor.

He then moved to films, ultimately signing with Paramount Pictures however World War II stalled his career. Castle was drafted into the Army Air Force, during which he made training films for the First Motion Picture Unit.

Upon returning to Hollywood, Castle found many of his fans had turned to Alan Ladd. He bumped into Wrather again who had become bored with the oil business.

Wrather decided to set up as a movie producer, making The Guilty (1947) starring Castle and Wrather's new wife Bonita Granville. Around this time Castle also starred in a series of noir-esque B films notably ‘Roses are Red,’ ‘Lighthouse,’ ‘The Invisible Wall’ & ‘I Wouldn’t Be in Your Shoes.’

In the 1950s Castle & his wife Zetta Castle opened a celebrity hideaway boarding house called ‘Castle’s Red Barn’ in Palm Springs, California.

Wrather tapped Castle again later in the 1960s to become a television producer for his beloved Lassie television program.

In May 1966, Castle was found in his North Hollywood, CA. apartment dead of an apparent medication overdose aged 48.

== Partial filmography ==
- Love Finds Andy Hardy (1938) - Dennis Hunt
- Rich Man, Poor Girl (1938) - Frank
- Young Dr. Kildare (1938) - Dr. Bates (uncredited)
- Men in Fright (1938, Short) - Hospital Orderly (uncredited)
- Out West with the Hardys (1938) - Dennis Hunt
- Fast and Loose (1939) - Desk Clerk (uncredited)
- These Glamour Girls (1939) - Jack
- Thunder Afloat (1939) - Radio Operator (uncredited)
- Nick Carter, Master Detective (1939) - Ed - 1st Hurt Worker (uncredited)
- I Take This Woman (1940) - Ted Fenton
- Northwest Passage (1940) - Richard Towne (uncredited)
- The Ghost Comes Home (1940) - 'Spig'
- Susan and God (1940) - Theater Usher (uncredited)
- We Who Are Young (1940) - Accountex Clerk Making Pass (uncredited)
- Strike Up the Band (1940) - Charlie (uncredited)
- You're the One (1941) - Tony Delmar
- Power Dive (1941) - Doug Farrell
- World Premiere (1941) - Joe Bemis
- Tombstone, the Town Too Tough to Die (1942) - Johnny Duane
- Wake Island (1942) - Pvt. Cunkle (uncredited)
- Star Spangled Rhythm (1942) - Worker - 'Swing Shift' Number (uncredited)
- The Searching Wind (1946) - David
- Lighthouse (1947) - Sam Wells
- Born to Speed (1947) - Mike Conroy
- Seven Were Saved (1947) - Lt. Pete Sturdevant
- The Guilty (1947) - Mike Carr
- High Tide (1947) - Tim 'T.M.' Slade
- The Invisible Wall (1947) - Harry Lane
- Roses Are Red (1947) - Robert A. Thorne / Don Carney
- Perilous Waters (1948) - Willie Hunter
- Madonna of the Desert (1948) - Joe Salinas
- Who Killed Doc Robbin (1948) - George - Defense Attorney
- I Wouldn't Be in Your Shoes (1948) - Thomas J. 'Tom' Quinn
- Strike It Rich (1948) - William 'Tex' Warren
- Stampede (1949) - Tim McCall
- Motor Patrol (1950) - Officer Ken Foster
- The Big Land (1957) - Tom Draper
- Gunfight at the O.K. Corral (1957) - Drunken Cowboy (final film role)
