= Guilty of Treason =

1950 film

- Directed by: Felix E. Feist
- Written by: Emmet Lavery
- Produced by: Robert Golden; Jack Wrather
- Starring: Charles Bickford; Bonita Granville; Paul Kelly; Richard Derr
- Cinematography: John L. Russell
- Edited by: Walter A. Thompson
- Music by: Emil Newman; Hugo Friedhofer
- Production company: Freedom Productions
- Distributed by: Eagle-Lion Films
- Release date: February 20, 1950
- Running time: 86 minutes
- Country: United States
- Language: English

Guilty of Treason is a 1950 American drama film directed by Felix E. Feist and starring Charles Bickford, Bonita Granville and Paul Kelly. Also known by the alternative title Treason, it is an anti-communist and anti-Soviet film about the story of József Mindszenty, a Roman Catholic cardinal from Hungary. Mindszenty opposed the Nazi occupation of his country during World War II as well as the later communist regime. Because of his outspoken opposition to communism, Mindszenty was arrested and tortured. After his release, he took refuge in the American embassy in Budapest for many years, maintaining his support for the Hungarians who wanted an end to the Russian occupation.

== Plot ==
A journalist who has just returned from Budapest, where he witnessed the treason trial of Cardinal József Mindszenty, delivers a speech to members of the Overseas Press Club. He tells the story of Stephanie Varna, a young teacher who takes a moral stand against communism despite her love for a Russian officer.

== Cast ==
- Charles Bickford as Joszef Cardinal Mindszenty
- Bonita Granville as Stephanie Varna
- Paul Kelly as Tom Kelly
- Richard Derr as Colonel Aleksandr Melnikov
- Roland Winters as Commissar Belov
- Berry Kroeger as Colonel Timar
- John Banner as Doctor Szandor Deste
- Alfred Linder as Janos
- Thomas Browne Henry as Colonel Gabriel Peter
- Nestor Paiva as Matyas Rakosi
- Morgan Farley as Doctor
- Lisa Howard as Soviet Official
- Elisabeth Risdon as Mindszenty's mother

== Production ==
The film was inspired by the book As We See Russia written by members of the Overseas Press Club.

Warner Bros. had originally planned to produce the film but buckled to the pressure of communist sympathizers and dropped the project. Producers Jack Wrather, Robert Golden and Edward Golden then teamed with writer Emmet Lavery to form Freedom Productions, which ultimately produced the film. The company faced resistance finding a distribution partner, again opposed by the communist influence in Hollywood, but the producers signed a deal with the Anglo-American company Eagle-Lion Films.

Mindszenty's story was portrayed again in the 1955 British film The Prisoner.

== Bibliography ==
- Shaw, Tony. Hollywood's Cold War. Edinburgh University Press, 2007.
