= You're in the Army Now =

1941 film by Lewis Seiler

- Promotional Movie Poster 1941
- Directed by: Lewis Seiler
- Written by: George Bentley and Paul Gerard Smith
- Produced by: Benjamin Stoloff
- Starring: Jimmy Durante; Phil Silvers; Jane Wyman; Regis Toomey
- Cinematography: Arthur L. Todd
- Edited by: Frank Magee
- Music by: Howard Jackson
- Production company: Warner Bros. Pictures
- Distributed by: Warner Bros. Pictures
- Release date: December 25, 1941 (United States)
- Running time: 79 minutes
- Country: United States
- Language: English

You're in the Army Now is a 1941 American comedy film directed by Lewis Seiler and starring Jimmy Durante, Phil Silvers, Jane Wyman and Regis Toomey. It was produced and distributed by Warner Bros. Pictures. It features the longest kiss in film history to date (lasting three minutes and five seconds), a record that lasted until 1988. The film's copyright was renewed in 1969.

== Synopsis ==
Two vacuum cleaner salesmen are drafted into the army. Fast-talking Homer tries to convince their new colonel that the cavalry regiment needs to be mechanized and tries to arrange a deal on some tanks. Meanwhile, the colonel's daughter begins a romance with one of the captains in the unit.

== Cast ==
Characters	Actors
Homer 'Jeeper' Smith	Jimmy Durante
Breezy Jones	Phil Silvers
Bliss Dobson	Jane Wyman
Capt. Joe Radcliffe	Regis Toomey
Colonel Dobson	Donald MacBride
Sgt. Madden	Joe Sawyer
Brig. Gen. Damon P. Winthrop	Clarence Kolb
Gen. Philpot	Paul Harvey
Capt. Austin	George Meeker
Lt. Col Rogers	Paul Stanton
Sgt. Thorpe	William Haade
Army doctor	John Maxwell
Della	Etta McDaniel

== See also ==
- 1941 in film
- You're in the Navy Now, a 1951 comedy film

== Bibliography ==
- Fetrow, Alan G. Feature Films, 1940-1949: A United States Filmography. McFarland, 1994.
