= The National Barn Dance =

1944 film

- Directed by: Hugh Bennett
- Screenplay by: Lee Loeb; Hal Fimberg
- Story by: Lee Loeb; Hal Fimberg
- Produced by: Walter MacEwen
- Starring: Jean Heather; Charles Quigley; Robert Benchley; Mabel Paige; Charles Dingle; Pat Buttram
- Cinematography: Henry Sharp
- Edited by: Everett Douglas
- Music by: Gil Grau; John Leipold; Rudy Schrager
- Production company: Paramount Pictures
- Distributed by: Paramount Pictures
- Release date: September 24, 1944
- Running time: 76 minutes
- Country: United States
- Language: English

The National Barn Dance is a 1944 American comedy film directed by Hugh Bennett and written by Lee Loeb and Hal Fimberg. The film stars Jean Heather, Charles Quigley, Robert Benchley, Mabel Paige, Charles Dingle and Pat Buttram. The film was released on September 24, 1944, by Paramount Pictures.

== Plot ==
The story presents a fictionalized origin of the popular radio series National Barn Dance, which aired from 1924 to 1968.

In Chicago, Johnny Burke pitches an idea to the Mitcham Advertising Agency: use a hillbilly group from Midvale to promote Garvey Soup on the radio. Mitcham throws Johnny out, but the determined promoter travels south to Midvale to recruit talent.

Johnny attends a barn dance in Midvale, and meets a group of performers: Lulu Belle and Scotty, Joe Kelly, Pat Buttram, the Dinning Sisters, and the Hoosier Hot Shots. Pretending to be Mitcham's employee, he signs them all to a contract.

Johnny returns to Chicago with the performers, but Mitcham isn't interested in hillbilly music. Johnny comes up with a scheme: pose as servants in Mitcham's house, and play music during a dinner party with the Garveys. The plan works: Mrs. Garvey is delighted with the music, and tells Mitcham to hire the performers.

== Cast ==
- Jean Heather as Betty
- Charles Quigley as Johnny Burke
- Robert Benchley as J.B. Mitcham
- Mabel Paige as Mrs. Garvey
- Charles Dingle as Mr. Garvey
- Pat Buttram as Pat Buttram
- Joe Kelly as Joe Kelly
- Myrtle Wiseman as Myrtle Wiseman (Lulu Belle)
- Scotty Wiseman as Scotty Wiseman
- The Dinning Sisters as Sister Singing Act
- The Hoosier Hotshots as The Hoosier Hotshots
- Frank Kettering as Frank
- Paul Trietsch as Hezzie
- Charles Ward as Gabe
- Ken Trietsch as Ken
- Luther W. Ossenbrink as Arkie
- National Barn Dance Troupe as Troupe Performers
