= Lighthouse (1947 film) =

1947 film directed by Frank Wisbar

- Directed by: Frank Wisbar
- Written by: Robert B. Churchill; Don Martin
- Produced by: Frank Gilbert; George Moskov
- Starring: Don Castle; June Lang; John Litel
- Cinematography: Walter Strenge
- Edited by: Robert Jahns
- Music by: Ernest Gold
- Production company: Sunset Productions
- Distributed by: Producers Releasing Corporation
- Release date: January 10, 1947
- Running time: 62 minutes
- Country: United States
- Language: English

Lighthouse is a 1947 American drama film directed by Frank Wisbar and starring Don Castle, June Lang and John Litel. A low-budget independent production, it was distributed by Producers Releasing Corporation. Some location shooting took place on the coast around San Pedro.

== Plot ==
Connie Armitage falls in love with lighthouse keeper Sam Wells, and happily tells her best friend that they are to be married, but when she makes a surprise visit to the lighthouse, the head keeper, Hank, innocently reveals that Sam is already married. Connie then marries the much older Hank on the rebound. The three all live together in the close confines of an isolated lighthouse. Sam tries it on with Connie, but she is starting to develop real feelings for her husband. Furious that Connie refuses to fall for more of his lies, Sam is determined to sabotage Connie and Hank's relationship - at any cost.

== Cast ==
- Don Castle as Sam Wells
- June Lang as Connie Armitage
- John Litel as Hank Armitage
- Marion Martin as JoJo - The Blonde
- Charles Wagenheim as Quimby - Insurance Adjustor
- Richard Bailey as Henry Simmons
- John Elliott as Justice of the Peace

== Bibliography ==
- Nicolella, Henry. Frank Wisbar: The Director of Ferryman Maria, from Germany to America and Back. McFarland, 2018.
