= Jack Wrather =

American businessman (1918–1984)

- Born: John Devereaux Wrather Jr. May 24, 1918; Amarillo, Texas, U.S.
- Died: November 12, 1984 (aged 66); Santa Monica, California, U.S.
- Resting place: Holy Cross Cemetery, Culver City
- Education: University of Texas at Austin (BA)
- Occupations: Television producer, entrepreneur, businessman
- Spouses: Molly O'Daniel (m. 1941; div. 1945) Bonita Granville (m. 1947)
- Children: 4

John Devereaux Wrather Jr. (May 24, 1918 – November 12, 1984), was an entrepreneur and petroleum businessman who became a television producer and later diversified by investing in broadcast stations and resort properties. He is best known for producing The Lone Ranger, Sergeant Preston of the Yukon, and Lassie television series in the 1950s as well as marrying actress Bonita Granville.

== Biography ==
Wrather was born in Amarillo, Texas on May 24, 1918 to Mazie (Cogdell) and John Devereaux Wrather. They moved to Tyler, where he grew up and graduated from the local high school in 1935. He graduated cum laude with a Bachelor of Arts degree from The University of Texas at Austin in 1939. He worked in the oilfields of East Texas as a wildcatter and pipeline walker as his college summer job. When his father became ill in the early 1940s, he took over as president of his father's oil company, Overton Refining Company.

=== First marriage and military service ===
On July 31, 1941, he married Molly O'Daniel, the daughter of Democratic Governor and later U.S. Senator Wilbert Lee "Pappy" O'Daniel. They had two children before divorcing in 1945. Wrather served in the U.S. Marine Corps Reserve during World War II (1942–1945) in three campaigns, had the rank of Captain, and commanded a Marine air group in the Philippines.

=== Film business ===
After the war, he met his old roommate, actor Don Castle, who was struggling in Hollywood, and bought the film rights to Cornell Woolrich's short story "Two Men in a Furnished Room" and set up Jack Wrather Pictures Inc. to film it (as The Guilty (1947)), starring Castle and Wrather's new wife Bonita Granville. He bought a home in Hollywood and by 1955, he had produced six more movies, including High Tide, Perilous Waters, Strike It Rich and Guilty of Treason. The films were produced for Eagle-Lion Films, Warner Bros., Monogram/Allied Artists and United Artists.

He and Granville had two children.

Wrather purchased 70% of television station KOTV in Tulsa, Oklahoma from fellow oil millionaire George Cameron. The other 30% was owned by station manager Maria Helen Alvarez and commercial manager John Hill. Wrather knew nothing about the management of a station and offered to increase Alvarez and Hill to 50% of the stock in exchange for their services.

Hill wanted to move on to real estate, so Wrather agreed to purchase his shares and increase Alvarez to 50% owner in the new Wrather-Alvarez Television and Wrather-Alvarez Broadcasting companies.

Wrather-Alvarez went on to purchase the San Diego television and radio stations KFMB-TV and KFMB in 1953 and New York City radio station WNEW in 1955. Television station KOTV was sold in 1954 when Alvarez relocated to the San Diego station. Wrather-Alvarez also owned WJDW-TV in Boston, and donated it in 1965 to the WGBH Educational Foundation, which operates it as the PBS station WGBX-TV.

Wrather-Alvarez also financed and owned the Disneyland Hotel in Anaheim. Walt Disney asked Wrather to build the hotel when Disney exhausted his credit line building the Disneyland theme park. The hotel was completed in 1955, and immediately shared the success of Disneyland. When Disney later attempted to buy the hotel, Wrather refused to sell.

In 1954, Wrather-Alvarez purchased the complete rights to the Lone Ranger character and took over production of the television series (1954–1957). The corporation also purchased the Lassie television series in 1956 and the Sergeant Preston of the Yukon television series in 1957.

The Wrather-Alvarez relationship did not end well. Wrather discovered that "Miss" Alvarez had married former partner John Hill when he had been "bought out" and his shares given to Alvarez. Wrather unsuccessfully sued Alvarez and Hill for fraud. In 1958, Wrather bought Alvarez's shares of Wrather-Alvarez and became sole owner of its television and hotel assets. The Wrather-Alvarez holdings were distributed into the separate companies Wrather Hotels, Lone Ranger Inc., Lone Ranger Television, Lone Ranger Pictures, and Lassie Television.

The Independent Television Corporation was formed as a joint venture between Jack Wrather and the British Incorporated Television Company in 1958. In September 1958, Independent Television Corporation purchased TPA for $11,350,000. The company operated primarily as a distribution service for syndicating television shows produced by Wrather or the British ITC company. Wrather later (about 1959–60) sold his shares of Independent Television Corporation to ITC. He was also the founder of Los Angeles public television station KCET.

Wrather is known as the man that "sued the mask off the Lone Ranger". When a new theatrical movie version of the Lone Ranger was being produced during the late 1970s, Wrather obtained a court order requiring Clayton Moore to quit making public appearances as the Lone Ranger. This resulted in a great deal of negative publicity, and The Legend of the Lone Ranger, released in 1981, was not well received. Before Wrather died, he gave Moore permission to resume making public appearances in costume.

=== Other investments ===
Wrather further diversified his holdings by building or buying resort hotels and other properties throughout the United States.

In addition to the Disneyland Hotel, he owned the Twin Lakes Lodge in Las Vegas, the L'Horizon Hotel in Palm Springs, California, the Balboa Bay Club & Resort in Newport Beach, and the Inn at the Park in Anaheim. In the 1970s, there was talk of the Disneyland-Alweg monorail being expanded to stop at the Inn at the Park, but it never came to fruition. The Inn at the Park has changed ownership frequently, and is currently operated as the Sheraton Park Hotel at the Anaheim Resort.

In 1957, Wrather purchased the Muzak corporation, a company providing "elevator music" for business environments. The company owned an extensive library of easy listening music and one of the world's largest recording plants. Wrather sold the company in 1972.

In the early 1980s, Wrather purchased, restored and made tourist attractions of the Spruce Goose and the RMS Queen Mary in Long Beach, California.

Over the years, he created or purchased many companies for his businesses and investments, including Evansville Refining Co., Overton Refining Co., Jack Wrather Pictures, Inc., Freedom Productions Corporation, Western States Investment Corporation, Wrather-Alvarez Broadcasting, Inc., General Television Corporation, Jack Wrather Productions, Wrather Hotels, Lone Ranger Inc., Lone Ranger Television, Lone Ranger Pictures, Lassie Television, the Muzak Corporation, and the A.C. Gilbert Company. In 1961, he combined his various holdings into the Wrather Corporation.

=== Death and aftermath ===
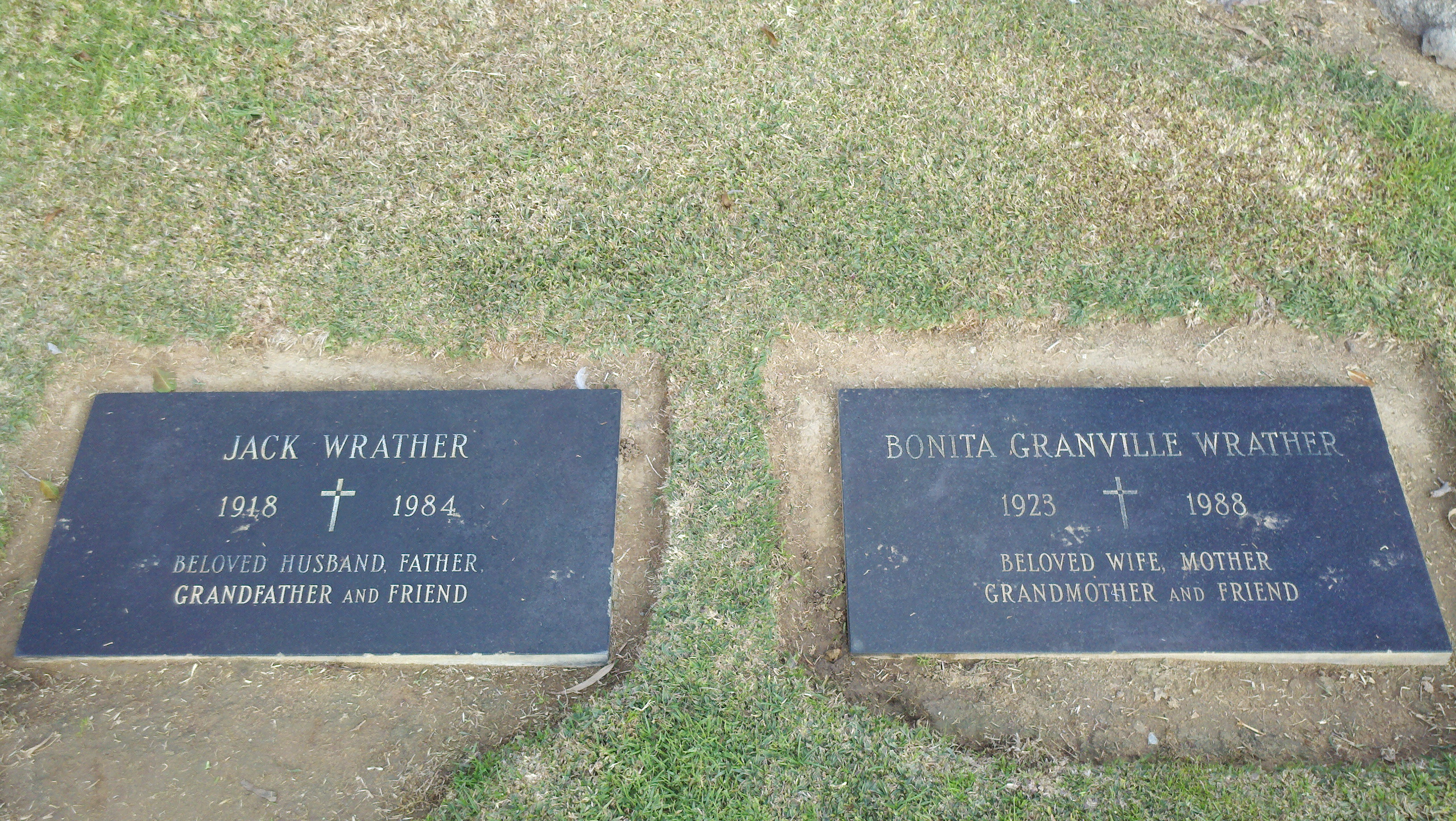
Wrather's grave, next to that of his wife Bonita Granville, at Holy Cross Cemetery, Culver City, California

Wrather died of cancer at age 66 on November 12, 1984, at St. John's Hospital in Santa Monica, California. His funeral was held at the Roman Catholic Church of the Good Shepherd in Beverly Hills and he was buried at the Holy Cross Cemetery, in Culver City, California.

Disney finally acquired the Disneyland Hotel in 1987, when it purchased half share ownership in the Wrather Corporation and the other half in 1988. Disney has retained the hotel but sold off most of the other assets. Most of the Wrather franchises are now owned by DreamWorks Classics.

Various documents related to Wrather, Bonita Granville, and the Wrather company are archived at Loyola Marymount University as part of its Center for the Study of Los Angeles collection, and at the Harry Ransom Center.

== Filmography ==
=== Films ===
- The Guilty (1947)
- High Tide (1947)
- Perilous Waters (1948)
- Strike it Rich (1948)
- Guilty of Treason/Treason (1950)
- The Lone Ranger and the Lost City of Gold (1958)
- The Magic of Lassie (1978)
- The Legend of the Lone Ranger (1981)

=== TV shows ===
- The Lone Ranger (1949–57)
- Lassie (1957–74)
- Sergeant Preston of the Yukon (1955–58)
