= The Bill Goodwin Show (radio program) =

1947 old-time radio situation comedy

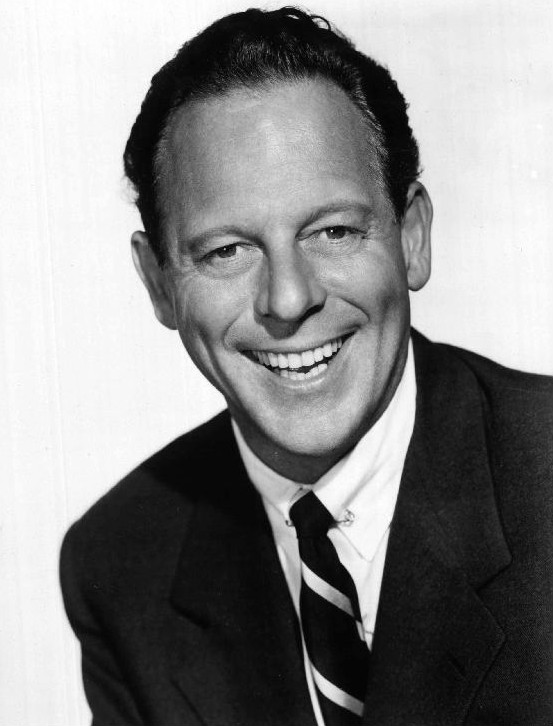
- Bill Goodwin
- Other names: Leave It to Bill
- Genre: Situation Comedy
- Running time: 30 minutes
- Country of origin: United States
- Language: English
- Syndicates: CBS
- Starring: Bill Goodwin
- Directed by: Larry Burns
- Produced by: Larry Burns
- Original release: April 26 – December 13, 1947

The Bill Goodwin Show is an old-time radio situation comedy in the United States. It was broadcast on CBS April 26, 1947 – December 13, 1947. In October 1947, the program's name was changed to Leave It To Bill.

== Format ==
The Bill Goodwin Show centered around "a hotshot insurance salesman" who was "an eager-beaver civic-improvement volunteer, with genius for landing behind eight-balls."

== Personnel ==
Bill Goodwin, usually known as an announcer, became an actor to star in this program. Other regulars heard on the program and their roles are indicated in the table below.

Character	Actor
Phillipa	Peggy Knudsen
Mr. Hendricks	Jim Backus
Groggins	Bill Johnstone
Dinwiddie sisters	Elvia Allman; Noreen Gammill
Dolores	Mary Jane Croft
Helen	Shirley Mitchell

Source: On the Air: The Encyclopedia of Old-Time Radio

Larry Burns was the director and producer.

== 1957 program ==
Goodwin had another radio program a decade later. The 55-minute Bill Goodwin Show was broadcast on NBC radio beginning March 25, 1957. It was carried by 95 of the network's affiliates and sponsored by Schick razors. This program was a variety show with Robert Linn and the Hi-Fi's quartet providing music and David Ketchum doing comedy. Howard Blake produced, directed, and wrote for the series. Other writers were Fred Fox, David Gregory, and Glenn Wheaton.

A review of the premiere episode in the trade publication Variety complimented the musical performances but said that Ketchum's comedy lacked humor. It described the talk portions of the episode as "limp and forced", suggesting that the show would benefit from "good pruning of the chatter and sharper writing".
