= Rudy Schrager =

Austro-Hungarian born American composer (1900–1983)

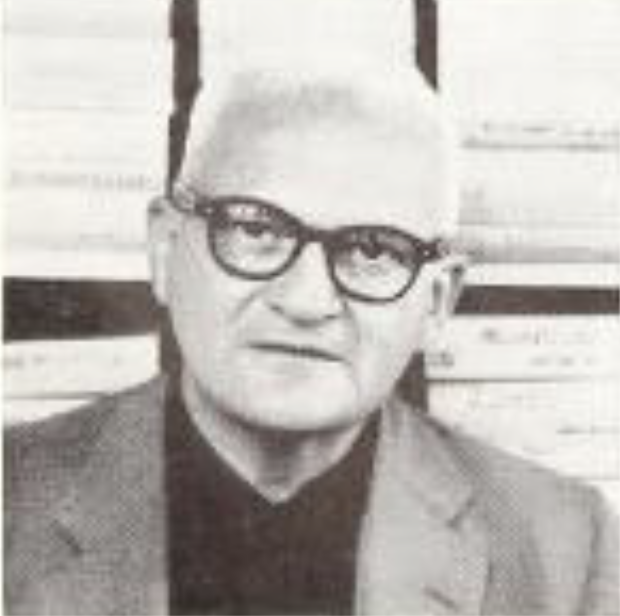
- Rudy Schrager in 1963
- Born: Rudolph Noachim Schrager; August 28, 1900; Czernowitz, Bukovina, Austria-Hungary
- Died: August 24, 1983 (aged 82); Los Angeles, California, United States
- Occupations: composer, conductor, pianist, organist
- Spouse(s): Glendora Glendon (divorced); Dorothy Morrison (divorced); Louise Barnes (divorced)
- Children: Susan Schrager (known as Mother Sudha Puri)

Rudolph "Rudy" Noachim Schrager (28 August 1900 – 24 August 1983) was an Austro-Hungarian-born American composer, conductor, pianist, and organist. A native of Czernowitz, Bukovina, he immigrated to the United States with his parents when he was approximately 12 years old and spent his teenage years living in The Bronx. He was educated at Stuyvesant High School in Manhattan, the University of Southern California in Los Angeles, and the Hochschule für Musik in Berlin. He lived most of his life in L. A. and worked as a composer and conductor for radio, television, and film. His first film score was for the 1936 screwball comedy My Man Godfrey (1936) which he co-composed with Charles Previn. He was a prolific film composer during the 1940s into the year 1950; crafting works both alone and with others for most of the studios in Hollywood.

After 1950 Shrager predominantly worked in television after being appointed music director of Lux Video Theatre which he led for much of the 1950s. He had previously worked on the radio program that series was adapted from, Lux Radio Theatre, from 1936 until the creation of the TV series. He was also known for his work as the pianist, organist, and composer for the radio drama Box 13 (1948–1949). In his later career he worked as a staff composer for Four Star Television. His other TV work included contributions to many American Western shows. He won a Western Heritage Award in 1965 for his work as a composer for the television series Rawhide.

== Early life and education ==
The son of Morris Schrager and Rose A. Schrager (nee Brambier), Rudy Schrager was born on 28 August 1900 in Czernowitz, Bukovina, Austria-Hungary (now Chernivtsi, Ukraine). He immigrated with his family to the United States in 1912 where they settled in The Bronx at a home on Beck St. He attended Stuyvesant High School in Manhattan, and became a naturalized American citizen.

Schrager earned Bachelor of Music degrees in organ performance and music theory from the University of Southern California in 1926. After graduating he worked as the in-house organist at the Raymond Theatre in Pasadena, California in 1926; playing the accompaniments to silent films and entertaining audiences with regular organ recitals. In 1927 he was a conductor for vaudeville shows at the Ritz Theatre in Los Angeles. In the early 1930s he pursued further music studies in Germany with Franz Schreker at the Hochschule für Musik in Berlin.

== Later life and career ==
In 1932 Schrager was the conductor for Harold Hecht's musical revue Hullabaloo which was staged at the Pasadena Community Playhouse under the direction of Paul Gerard Smith.

Schrager co-wrote his first film score with Charles Previn; creating the music for the Universal Pictures screwball comedy film My Man Godfrey (1936). This was followed by three scores crafted for films released by 20th Century Fox in 1939: Stanley and Livingstone, Swanee River, and Hollywood Cavalcade. These were written in collaboration with multiple other composers. Schrager also played the piano for music recorded for the latter film; serving as Al Jolson's accompanist.

Schrager's most prolific years as a film score composer were between 1942 and 1950 when he created scores to over 20 films for a variety of Hollywood studios. For Monogram Pictures he wrote the scores to Private Snuffy Smith (1942), Sweethearts of the U.S.A. (1944), The Guilty (1947), High Tide (1947), and Perilous Waters (1948). For Producers Releasing Corporation he wrote the scores to Career Girl (1944) and Dixie Jamboree (1944). For Columbia Pictures he wrote the scores to Gunfighters (1947) and Coroner Creek (1948). For Allied Artists Pictures he wrote the score to Strike It Rich (1948), and for United Artists he wrote the scores to Sleep, My Love (1948), The Great Dan Patch (1949), and The Iroquois Trail (1950).

Shraeger also wrote the scores to several films for Paramount Pictures; including Take It Big (1944), The National Barn Dance (1944), People Are Funny (1946), Tokyo Rose (1946), Swamp Fire (1946), Fear in the Night (1947), and The Eagle and the Hawk (1950). For 20th Century Fox he wrote the scores to Deadline for Murder (1946), Strange Journey (1946), Dangerous Years (1947), and Roses Are Red (1947). He created only one score for RKO Pictures; writing for the film The Green Promise (1949). He also assisted Charlie Chaplin in composing the score for the film Monsieur Verdoux (1947) and was credited as that film's music arranger and music director.

Schrager also worked in radio. He was responsible for performing and composing the music for the 1940s radio drama Box 13 starring Alan Ladd. He was a longtime composer and conductor for the radio program Lux Radio Theatre where he began working in 1936. He also worked in that capacity for its associated television program Lux Video Theatre during the 1950s; serving as music director of that program since its inception in 1950.

Schrager was a staff composer for Four Star Television. He composed music for the television programs The Detectives (1959), Peter Loves Mary (1960–1961), The Tom Ewell Show (1961), The Gertrude Berg Show (1961–1962), Target: The Corruptors! (1961–1962), The Dick Powell Theatre (1961–1963), The Lloyd Bridges Show (1962–1963), Saints and Sinners (1962–1963), and Summer Playhouse (1964). In his later career he became known for his work in American Western television series. He won a Western Heritage Award in 1965 for his work as the composer for television series Rawhide (1964–1965). Other Western programs that he composed music for included Johnny Ringo (1959–1960), Wanted Dead or Alive (1959–1961), The Westerner (1960), Gunsmoke (1964–1965), and The Big Valley (1966).

== Personal life ==
He married his first wife Glendora Glendon on August 31, 1934. Glendora was the daughter of actor J. Frank Glendon. Their marriage ended in divorce, and Glendora married her second husband, Bob Gary Gregory, in 1940. Rudy married his second wife, Dorothy Morrison, on March 13, 1941. Their daughter Susan was born a year later. Susan became an educational psychologist, educator, and a spiritual leader with the Temple of the Universal Spirit in Los Angeles. She is now known as Mother Sudha Puri and is connected to the Vedanta Centre in Cohasset, Massachusetts. Rudy's third marriage to Louise Barnes also ended in divorce.

== Death and collection of his papers ==
Schrager died in Los Angeles, California on 24 August 1983. The American Heritage Center at the University of Wyoming has an archive of his papers.

== Filmography ==
- My Man Godfrey (1936)
- Stanley and Livingstone (1939)
- Swanee River (1939)
- Hollywood Cavalcade (1939)
- Private Snuffy Smith (1942)
- Career Girl (1944)
- Take It Big (1944)
- Dixie Jamboree (1944)
- Sweethearts of the U.S.A. (1944)
- The National Barn Dance (1944)
- People Are Funny (1946)
- Tokyo Rose (1946)
- Deadline for Murder (1946)
- Strange Journey (1946)
- Swamp Fire (1946)
- The Guilty (1947)
- Dangerous Years (1947)
- Gunfighters (1947)
- Fear in the Night (1947)
- High Tide (1947)
- Roses Are Red (1947)
- Strike It Rich (1948)
- Sleep, My Love (1948)
- Coroner Creek (1948)
- Perilous Waters (1948)
- The Great Dan Patch (1949)
- The Green Promise (1949)
- The Sundowners (1950)
- The Iroquois Trail (1950)
- The Eagle and the Hawk (1950)
- High Lonesome (1950)
- The 30 Foot Bride of Candy Rock (1959)
- The Last Voyage (1960)
