= The Iroquois Trail =

1950 American film by Phil Karlson

- Theatrical release poster
- Directed by: Phil Karlson
- Written by: Richard Schayer
- Based on: The Leatherstocking Tales by James Fenimore Cooper
- Produced by: Bernard Small
- Starring: George Montgomery; Brenda Marshall
- Cinematography: Henry Freulich
- Edited by: Kenneth Crane
- Music by: Rudy Schrager
- Production company: Edward Small Productions
- Distributed by: United Artists
- Release date: June 16, 1950
- Running time: 86 minutes
- Country: United States
- Language: English
- Budget: $400,000 (est.)

The Iroquois Trail is a 1950 American Western film directed by Phil Karlson starring George Montgomery and Brenda Marshall. It is set during the French-Indian War. It is an adaptation of James Fenimore Cooper's 1826 work The Last of the Mohicans, with significant alterations. As with the book, one of the major plot lines is based on the siege of Fort William Henry and the subsequent massacre.

== Plot ==
In 1757 the French around Montreal are poised to move south. A young American volunteer in the British Army, Sergeant Tom Cutler, is sent northwards carrying a dispatch which orders the garrison of Fort Williams to reinforce the vulnerable Crown Point outpost. Cutler is murdered on the way by two men acting as British scouts, one of whom is an Ogane, a French-allied Huron posing as a Mohawk. Crown Point is not relieved in time and falls to the French.

Returning home after two years away, Sergeant Cutler's elder brother Nat "Hawkeye" Cutler and his companion, a Delaware Indian Chief Sagamore, investigate the killing of Tom, who is now wrongly believed by the authorities to have been a traitor. Nat and Sagamore enlist as scouts for the reinforcements being sent out to Fort Williams. They escort the British Captain West carrying important despatches, and Marion Thorne, the daughter of the Fort's commander. They foil an attempt by Ogane to betray them to the Hurons and bring them safety to Fort Williams. However, their apparent insubordination leaves their commander suspicious of their loyalty.

General Montcalm is being supplied with information by a spy inside the Fort, which is carried out to him by Ogane. Montcalm ambushes a force of American infantry and advances with the French Army to lay siege to the Fort. Hawkeye is able to expose the traitor as Captain Brownwell, a French-born officer serving as quartermaster to the British forces, but is too late to stop further information passing out to Montcalm. Aware that the Fort is indefensible, Montcalm offers it favorable peace terms. This outrages Ogane who wants vengeance against the Anglo-Americans, and he leads his Hurons in a night attack in which they kill many of the Fort's defenders. Marion Thorne is kidnapped by Ogane who wants her as his wife.

Hawkeye, Captain West and Sagamore follow the Hurons and rescue Marion. They are then pursued by Ogane until they reach the shelter of the Ottawa tribe, rivals of the Hurons. The Ottawa leader suggests they can go free if one of them can defeat Ogane in single combat. Hawkeye fights and kills Ogane, and they are allowed to return home. Hawkeye is appointed as chief scout to the British forces as they prepare a fresh offensive for the following year.

== Cast ==
- George Montgomery as Nat "Hawkeye" Cutler
- Brenda Marshall as Marion Thorne
- Glenn Langan as Capt. Jonathan West
- Monte Blue as Sagamore
- Paul Cavanagh as Col. Eric Thorne
- Sheldon Leonard as Ogane
- Reginald Denny as Capt. Brownell
- Dan O'Herlihy as Lt. Blakeley
- John Doucette as Sam Girty
- Stanley Blystone as Major (uncredited)

== Production ==
Filming began June 1949.

== Bibliography ==
- Barker, Martin & Sabin, Roger. The Lasting of the Mohicans. University Press of Mississippi, 1995.
