= Madonna of the Desert =

1948 film by George Blair

- Theatrical release poster
- Directed by: George Blair
- Screenplay by: Albert DeMond
- Story by: Frank Wisbar
- Produced by: Stephen Auer
- Starring: Lynne Roberts; Don "Red" Barry; Don Castle; Sheldon Leonard; Paul Hurst; Roy Barcroft
- Cinematography: John MacBurnie
- Edited by: Harry Keller
- Music by: Mort Glickman
- Production company: Republic Pictures
- Distributed by: Republic Pictures
- Release date: February 23, 1948
- Running time: 60 minutes
- Country: United States
- Language: English

Madonna of the Desert is a 1948 American crime film directed by George Blair and written by Albert DeMond. The film stars Lynne Roberts, Don "Red" Barry, Don Castle, Sheldon Leonard, Paul Hurst and Roy Barcroft. The film was released on February 23, 1948 by Republic Pictures.

== Plot ==
An unscrupulous art collector offers to buy a historic priceless statue and spurned. He devises a plan to steal but an ex con beats him to it but only temporarily.

== Cast ==
- Lynne Roberts as Monica Dale
- Don "Red" Barry as Tony French
- Don Castle as Joe Salinas
- Sheldon Leonard as Nick Julian
- Paul Hurst as Pete Connors
- Roy Barcroft as Buck Keaton
- Paul E. Burns as Hank Davenport
- Betty Blythe as Mrs. Brown
- Grazia Narciso as Mama Baravelli
- Martin Garralaga as Papa Baravelli
- Frank Yaconelli as Peppo
- Maria Genardi as Mrs. Pasquale
- Renee Donatt as Maria Baravelli
- Vernon Cansino as Enrico
