= Jean Heather =

American actress (1921–1995)

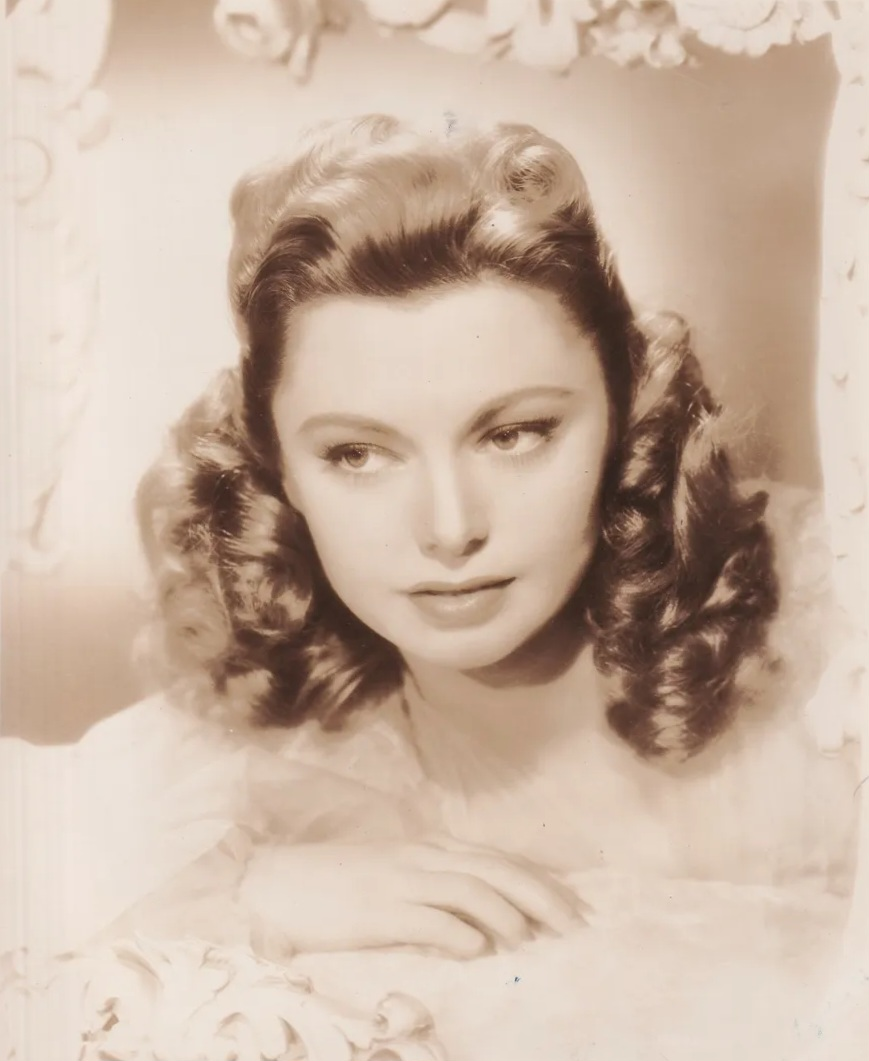
- Born: Jean Heatherington; February 21, 1921; Omaha, Nebraska, U.S.
- Died: October 29, 1995 (aged 74); Los Angeles, California, U.S.
- Occupation: Actress
- Years active: 1942–1949
- Spouse: Arthur F. Meier (m. 1944; died 1985)

Jean Heather (born Jean Heatherington; February 21, 1921 – October 29, 1995) was an American actress who appeared in eight feature films during the 1940s.

== Early years ==
Born Jean Heatherington on February 21, 1921, Heather was the only child of Dewey and Florence Heatherington. She was born in Omaha. After she and her parents moved to Oakland, California, she graduated from Oakland High School. She began her collegiate studies at the University of California at Berkeley before studying at Oregon State University, 1940 to 1941. She transferred to the University of Washington in 1942. She was an initiate of the Alpha Theta chapter of Alpha Delta Pi at the University of Washington.

== Career ==
Following her college graduation, Heather signed a contract with Paramount. She acted in two Oscar-nominated movies in 1944: the crime drama Double Indemnity, in which she played Lola Dietrichson, a young woman convinced that her stepmother Phyllis (Barbara Stanwyck) is responsible for the murder of her father, and Going My Way, where she played a runaway teenager assisted by Father O'Malley (Bing Crosby).

Heather's acting career was cut short by an automobile accident in December 1947, in which she was thrown from her car onto the pavement and suffered severe facial lacerations.

== Personal life and death ==
Heather married United States Military Academy graduate Arthur Ferdinand Meier on July 5, 1944, in Glendale, California. Meier later became a corporate executive. After 41 years of marriage, Meier died in 1985 from pulmonary disease. He also worked in entertainment as a performer, writer, director, and producer, using the stage name John Stockton. Heather died ten years later. Both were cremated and their ashes scattered in the Pacific Ocean.

== Filmography ==
Year	Title	Role	Notes
1942	Holiday Inn	4 July Dancer	Uncredited
1944	Going My Way	Carol James	
1944	Double Indemnity	Lola Dietrichson	
1944	Our Hearts Were Young and Gay	Frances Smithers	
1944	The National Barn Dance	Betty	
1945	Murder, He Says	Elany Fleagle	
1945	Duffy's Tavern	Jean Heather	
1946	The Well Groomed Bride	Wickley	
1947	The Last Round-up	Carol Taylor	
1949	Red Stallion in the Rockies	Cynthia "Cindy" Smith	(final film role)
