= Strange Journey (film) =

1946 film directed by James Tinling

- Directed by: James Tinling
- Written by: Irving Elman; Charles Kenyon
- Produced by: Sol M. Wurtzel
- Starring: Paul Kelly; Osa Massen; Hillary Brooke
- Cinematography: Benjamin H. Kline
- Edited by: William F. Claxton
- Music by: Rudy Schrager
- Production company: Sol M. Wurtzel Productions
- Distributed by: 20th Century Fox
- Release date: October 3, 1946
- Running time: 65 minutes
- Country: United States
- Language: English

Strange Journey is a 1946 American drama film directed by James Tinling and starring Paul Kelly, Osa Massen and Hillary Brooke.

== Plot ==
On an isolated island, a reformed gangster and his wife battle a group of Nazi agents attempting to get their hands on uranium deposits.

== Cast ==
- Paul Kelly as Lucky Leeds
- Osa Massen as Christine Jenner
- Hillary Brooke as Patti Leeds
- Lee Patrick as Mrs. Lathrop
- Bruce Lester as Roger Blythe
- Gene Roth as Hansen
- Kurt Katch as Horst
- Fritz Leiber as Prof. Jenner
- Larry J. Blake as Karl
- Joseph Crehan as Thompson
- Louise Franklin as Nellie
- Daniel De Jonghe as German
- Peter Michael as German
- Kurt Neumann as German

== Bibliography ==
- Phillips, Alastair & Vincendeau, Ginette. Journeys of Desire: European Actors in Hollywood. British Film Institute, 2006.
