= Sheldon Leonard =

American actor and producer (1907–1997)

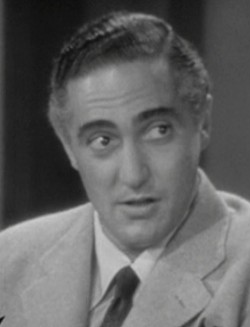
- Leonard in the trailer for Another Thin Man (1939)
- Born: Sheldon Leonard Bershad; February 22, 1907; New York City, U.S.
- Died: January 11, 1997 (aged 89); Beverly Hills, California, U.S.
- Education: Syracuse University
- Occupations: Actor; producer; director; writer
- Years active: 1934–1994
- Spouse: Frances Bober (m. 1931)
- Children: 2

Sheldon Leonard Bershad (February 22, 1907 – January 11, 1997) was an American film and television actor, producer, director, and screenwriter.

== Early life ==
Sheldon Leonard Bershad was born in Manhattan, New York City, the son of middle-class Jewish parents Frank Bershad and Anna Levit. He graduated from Syracuse University in 1929.

== Career ==
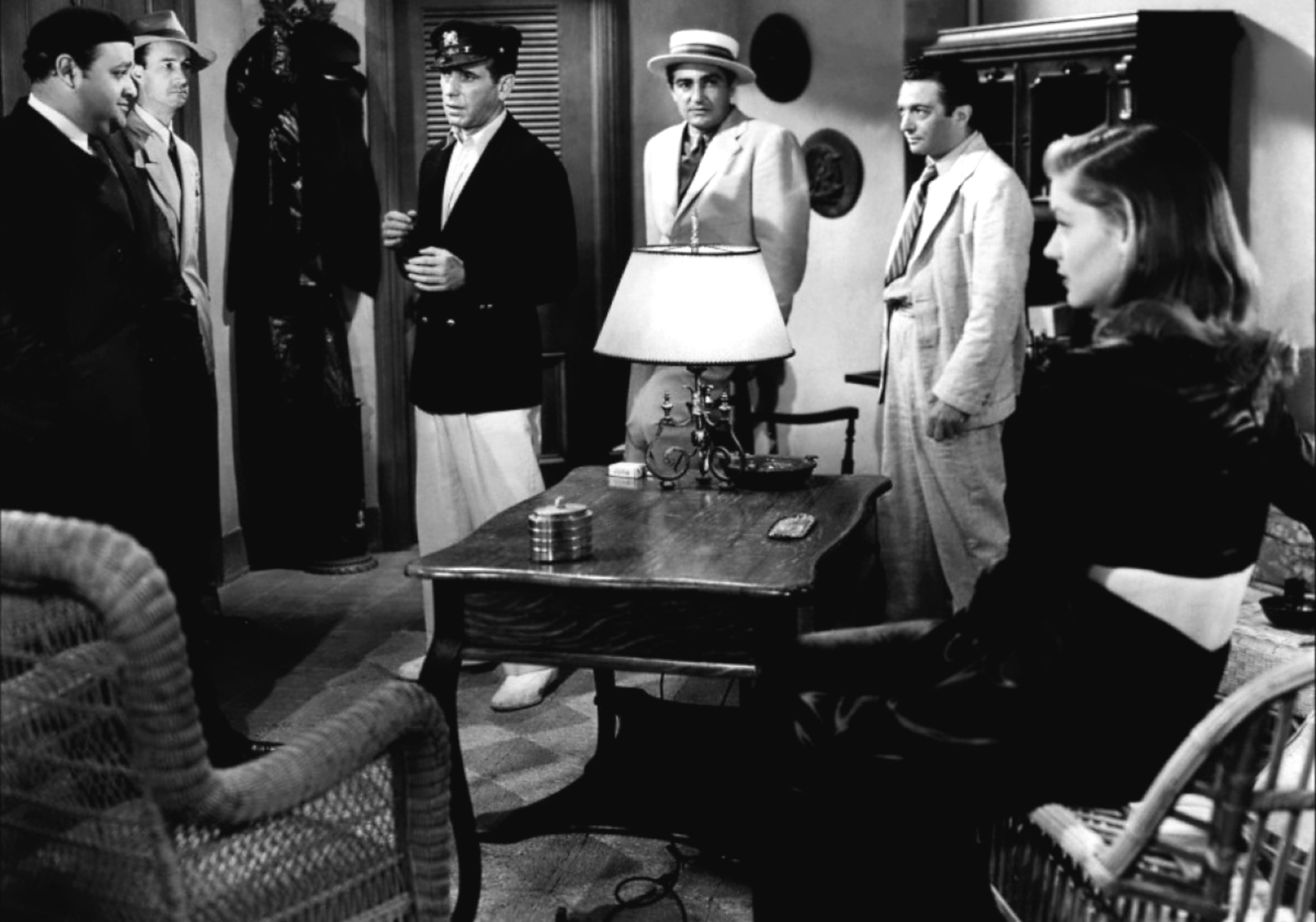
Dan Seymour, Aldo Nadi, Humphrey Bogart, Sheldon Leonard, Marcel Dalio and Lauren Bacall in To Have and Have Not (1944)

=== Film ===
As an actor, Leonard specialized in playing supporting characters, especially gangsters or "heavies". His trademark was his especially thick New York accent, usually delivered from the side of his mouth. His breakthrough role was in Another Thin Man (1939), in which he played a soft-spoken but dangerous murder suspect. From then on he was typecast as smooth gangsters or streetwise guys in such movies as It's a Wonderful Life (1946; as bartender Nick), To Have and Have Not (1944), Guys and Dolls (1955), and Open Secret (1948). He was a favorite of director Frank Capra, who asked him to play an executive mobster in his 1961 movie Pocketful of Miracles. Leonard became so associated with tough-guy parts that he was occasionally cast against type, as a law-enforcement officer, in movies like Street of Chance (1942) and Decoy (1946). He even played a pirate in Captain Kidd (1945).

=== Radio ===
On radio from 1945 to 1955, Leonard played an eccentric racetrack tout on The Jack Benny Program and later in the TV series of the same name. His role was to hail Benny in railroad stations, on street corners, or in department stores ("Hey, Bud. C'mere a minute."), ask Benny what he was about to do, and then proceed to try to argue him out of his course of action by resorting to inane and irrelevant racing logic. As "The Tout", he never gave out information on horse racing, unless Jack demanded it. One excuse the tout gave was, "Who knows about horses?"

Leonard also appeared regularly on The Phil Harris-Alice Faye Show, as 'Grogan,' a criminal thug, who sometimes takes it upon himself to "help" Phil Harris.

Leonard was part of the cast of voice actors on the Damon Runyon Theatre radio show (1948–1949). He was part of the ensemble cast of the Martin and Lewis radio show. He also appeared frequently on Dragnet and The Adventures of the Saint, often playing gangsters and heavies, but also sometimes in more sympathetic roles. Leonard was also a regular on the radio comedy series The Adventures of Maisie in the 1940s. During the 1950s, Leonard provided the voice of lazy, fat cat Dodsworth in two Warner Bros. Merrie Melodies cartoons directed by Robert McKimson.

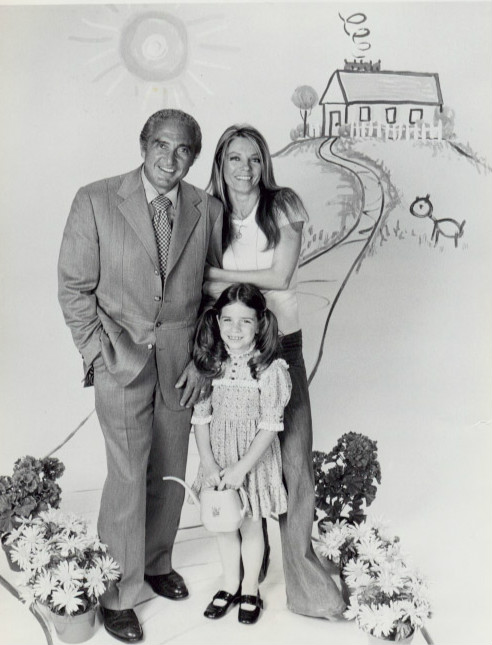
Leonard, Sheree North and Quinn Cummings in Big Eddie, 1975

In the adventure movie The Iroquois Trail (1950), Leonard played against type in the significant role of Chief Ogane, a Native American warrior, who pursues and fights the frontiersman Nat "Hawkeye" Cutler (George Montgomery) in a climactic duel to the death with knives.

=== Producer ===
Though he never entirely abandoned acting, by the mid-1950s Leonard was much more likely to be found behind the camera than in front of it, as he transitioned from a character actor into a successful TV producer (often in partnership with Danny Thomas), and also a frequent TV episode director. Leonard's hits as a producer included The Danny Thomas Show (aka Make Room for Daddy) (1953–1964), where midway through that series run, he had a recurring role as Danny's agent, Phil Brokaw; The Andy Griffith Show (1960–1968); Gomer Pyle, U.S.M.C. (1964–1969); and I Spy (1965–1968). Thanks to his many years in show business, Leonard had cultivated a quick, shrewd capacity for pinpointing strengths and flaws in prospective projects. It was Leonard who recognized that a sitcom pilot, Head of the Family, was structurally sound but miscast. He felt that actor–writer Carl Reiner was too overbearing as the lead, and insisted that the script be refilmed with up-and-coming comic Dick Van Dyke. The result was The Dick Van Dyke Show (1961–1966).

Sheldon Leonard also directed several TV series episodes, including four of the first eight episodes of the TV series Lassie (1954). Leonard also provided the voice of Linus the Lionhearted in a series of Post Crispy Critters cereal TV commercials in 1963–1964, which led to a Linus cartoon series that aired on Saturday (and later, Sunday) mornings on CBS (1964–1966) and ABC (1967–1969). He also was briefly the star of his own television show Big Eddie (1975), where he played the owner of a large sports arena. The show lasted for only ten episodes.

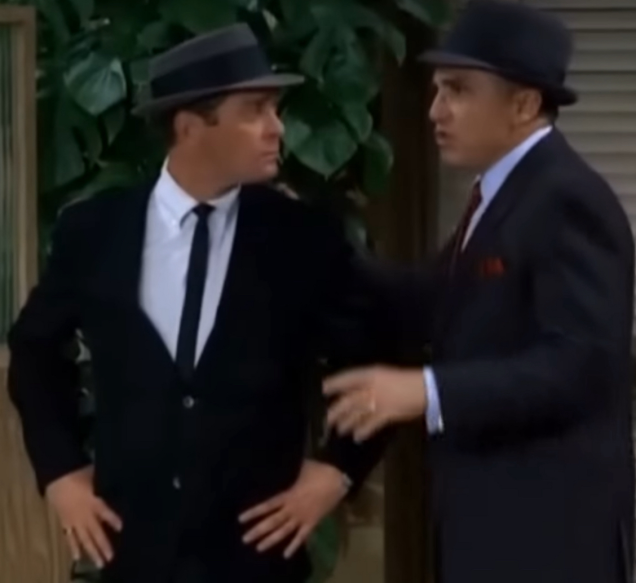
Leonard (right) with Fred Stromsoe in The Lucy Show, 1967

The character of Andy Taylor was introduced in a 1960 episode of The Danny Thomas Show, which led to the series The Andy Griffith Show. Leonard is informally credited with developing the practice of using an episode of a series as a backdoor pilot episode for new series, in which a guest star is introduced as a new character with the intention of using this character as the basis for a new show. Leonard introduced the Andy Griffith spin-off Mayberry R.F.D. as the summer replacement for the Griffith show, so it would have a pre-sold audience during the regular season. He was the executive producer on Gomer Pyle, U.S.M.C., and had an appearance on the show as a Hollywood producer who has to do 34 takes on a movie scene before Sergeant Carter gets it right ("A Star Is Not Born").

Leonard also has the distinction (along with author Mickey Spillane) of being one of the first two Miller Lite spokesmen. Using his trademark accent, he told the audience, "I was at first reluctant to try Miller Lite, but then I was persuaded to do so by my friend, Large Louis." One of his last acting roles was a guest appearance on the TV series Cheers, in which he played Sid Nelson, the proprietor of "The Hungry Heifer", Norm Peterson's favorite eating establishment.

== Death ==
Leonard died at his home in Beverly Hills, California, on January 11, 1997, at age 89. He was buried at Hillside Memorial Park Cemetery in Culver City, California.

== Legacy ==
Bill Cosby, whom Leonard cast in I Spy, described Leonard as "my last father" when he dedicated an episode of Cosby to both Leonard and his slain son Ennis Cosby. Bill Cosby included an impersonation of Sheldon Leonard in one track of his 1966 hit comedy album Wonderfulness. The track "Niagara Falls" describes Sheldon Leonard's honeymoon at Niagara Falls.

In "Monkees Marooned", the eighth episode of the second season of The Monkees, a character named Leonard Sheldon, and speaking with Leonard's accent, approaches Peter Tork on the street, much like "The Tout" and persuades Tork to trade his guitar for a treasure map.

Leonard's name served as an eponym for the characters Sheldon Cooper and Leonard Hofstadter in the 2007–2019 American sitcom The Big Bang Theory because the writers were fans of his work.

== Selected filmography ==
Actor

- The People's Enemy (1935) as Third Department of Justice Representative
- Ouanga (1936) as LeStrange, the Overseer
- Another Thin Man (1939) as Phil Church
- Tall, Dark and Handsome (1941) as Pretty Willie Williams
- Private Nurse (1941) as John Winton
- Buy Me That Town (1941) as Chink Moran
- Week-End in Havana (1941) as Boris
- Married Bachelor (1941) as Johnny Branigan
- Rise and Shine (1941) as Menace
- Born to Sing (1942) as Pete Detroit
- Tortilla Flat (1942) as Tito Ralph
- Pierre of the Plains (1942) as Clairou
- Street of Chance (1942) as Detective Joe Marruci
- Lucky Jordan (1942) as Slip Moran
- City Without Men (1943) as Monk LaRue
- Taxi, Mister (1943) as Gangster Louis Glorio / The Frisco Ghost
- Hit the Ice (1943) as 'Silky' Fellowsby
- Passport to Suez (1943) as Johnny Booth
- Harvest Melody (1943) as Chuck
- Klondike Kate (1943) as 'Sometime' Smith
- Timber Queen (1944) as Smacksie Golden
- Uncertain Glory (1944) as Henri Duval
- Trocadero (1944) as Mickey Jones
- Gambler's Choice (1944) as Chappie Wilson
- To Have and Have Not (1944) as Lt. Coyo
- The Falcon in Hollywood (1944) as Louie Buchanan
- Zombies on Broadway (1945) as Ace Miller
- Crime, Inc. (1945) as Capt. Ferrone
- Radio Stars on Parade (1945) as Lucky Maddox
- River Gang (1945) as Peg Leg
- Why Girls Leave Home (1945) as Chris Williams
- Captain Kidd (1945) as Cyprian Boyle
- Frontier Gal (1945) as 'Blackie' Shoulders
- The Gentleman Misbehaves (1946) as Trigger Stazzi
- Her Kind of Man (1946) as Felix Bender
- Rainbow Over Texas (1946) as Kirby Haynes
- Somewhere in the Night (1946) as Sam
- Bowery Bombshell (1946) as Ace Deuce Baker
- The Last Crooked Mile (1946) as Ed 'Wires' MacGuire
- Decoy (1946) as Police Sgt. Joe Portugal
- It's a Wonderful Life (1946) as Nick, the bartender
- Sinbad the Sailor (1947) as Auctioneer
- Violence (1947) as Fred Stalk
- The Hal Roach Comedy Carnival (1947) as Louie, in 'Fabulous Joe'
- The Fabulous Joe (1947) as Louie
- The Gangster (1947) as Cornell
- Open Secret (1948) as Detective Sgt. Mike Frontelli
- Alias a Gentleman (1948) as Harry Bealer
- If You Knew Susie (1948) as Steve Garland
- Madonna of the Desert (1948) as Nick Julian
- Jinx Money (1948) as Lippy Harris
- Joe Palooka in Winner Take All (1948) as Hermon
- Shep Comes Home (1948) as 'Swifty' Lewis
- Two Knights from Brooklyn (1949) as Louis Glorio / The Frisco Ghost (archive footage)
- Daughter of the Jungle (1949) as Dalton Kraik
- My Dream Is Yours (1949) as Fred Grimes
- Take One False Step (1949) as Pacciano
- The Iroquois Trail (1950) as Chief Ogane
- Abbott and Costello Meet the Invisible Man (1951) as Morgan
- Behave Yourself! (1951) as Shortwave Bert
- Come Fill the Cup (1951) as Lennie Garr
- Here Come the Nelsons (1952) as Duke
- Kiddin' the Kitten (1952) as Dodsworth (voice)
- Young Man with Ideas (1952) as Rodwell 'Brick' Davis
- Sock-a-Doodle-Do (1952) as Kid Banty (voice)
- Breakdown (1952) as Nick Sampson
- Stop, You're Killing Me (1952) as Lefty
- A Peck o' Trouble (1953) as Dodsworth (voice)
- The Diamond Queen (1953) as Mogul
- Money From Home (1953) as Jumbo Schneider
- Guys and Dolls (1955) as Harry the Horse
- Pocketful of Miracles (1961) as Steve Darcey
- Maude (1977) Waiter
- The Brink's Job (1978) as J. Edgar Hoover
- Murder, She Wrote (1990) as Bulldog Kowalski in episode "The Big Show of 1965"

Producer

- The Danny Thomas Show (1953–1964). He also appeared onscreen as Phil Brokaw (1957–1961).
- The Andy Griffith Show (1960–1968).
- The Dick Van Dyke Show (1961–1966). He also appeared onscreen in the season 3 episode "Big Max Calvada".
- Gomer Pyle, U.S.M.C. (1964–1969). He also appeared onscreen in the season 5 episode "A Star is Not Born".
- I Spy (1965–1968).
- Accidental Family (1967–1968)
- My World and Welcome to It (1969–1970)
- From a Bird's Eye View (1970–1971)
- Shirley's World (1971–1972)
- I Spy Returns (1994)

Director

- It's Always Jan
- The Andy Griffith Show
- The Danny Thomas Show
- The Dick Van Dyke Show
- My Favorite Martian (pilot only)
- I Spy
- Lassie (4 episodes, Season 1: 1954)
