= Red Stallion in the Rockies =

1949 film by Ralph Murphy

- Theatrical release poster
- Directed by: Ralph Murphy
- Screenplay by: Tom Reed; Francis Rosenwald
- Story by: Tom Reed
- Produced by: Aubrey Schenck
- Starring: Arthur Franz
- Cinematography: John Alton
- Edited by: Norman Colbert
- Music by: Lucien Cailliet
- Production company: Aubrey Schenck Productions
- Distributed by: Eagle-Lion Films
- Release date: May 2, 1949 (United States)
- Running time: 85 minutes
- Country: United States
- Language: English

Red Stallion in the Rockies is a 1949 American Cinecolor Western film directed by Ralph Murphy and starring Arthur Franz.

== Plot ==
Stranded circus men save a mare-happy trick horse hunted by Colorado ranchers.

== Cast ==
- Arthur Franz as Thad Avery
- Jean Heather as Cynthia "Cindy" Smith
- Jim Davis as Dave Ryder
- Ray Collins as Matthew "Matt" Simpson
- Wallace Ford as "Talky" Carson
- Leatrice Joy as Martha Simpson
- James Kirkwood as Judge Hardy
- Dynamite as The Red Stallion

== See also ==
- List of films about horses
