= Peggy Knudsen =

American actress (1923–1980)

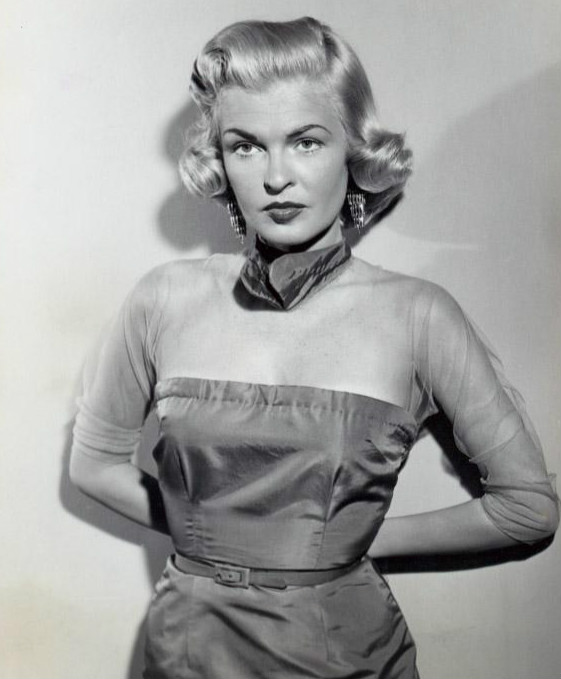
- Knudsen in 1956
- Born: Margaret Ann Knudsen; April 22, 1923; Duluth, Minnesota, U.S.
- Died: July 11, 1980 (aged 57); Encino, California, U.S.
- Years active: 1940–1965
- Spouse(s): Adrian P. Samish (1942–1946; divorced); Jim Jordan (1949–1960; divorced); Francis S. Kellstrom (1962–1962; divorced)
- Children: 3

Margaret Ann "Peggy" Knudsen (April 22, 1923 – July 11, 1980) was an American character actress.

== Early life ==
She was born Margaret Ann Knudsen in Duluth, Minnesota. Her father was Conrad Knudsen, Duluth's fire chief. Her ancestors were Irish and Norwegian.

== Career ==
=== Stage ===
Knudsen made her Broadway debut in My Sister Eileen (1940), succeeding Jo Ann Sayers, who had originated the role. The show's producer saw Knudsen working in a stage door canteen and chose her to take over the role. It was Knudsen's only New York stage credit.

=== Film ===
Knudsen began her film career in 1946 in A Stolen Life opposite Bette Davis. (In a February 15, 1948, newspaper column, entertainment writer Louella Parsons quoted Knudsen saying, "My first picture was Shadow of a Woman with Helmut Dantine. I played his ex-wife." That same year, she appeared in bit parts in several films including The Big Sleep and Humoresque with Joan Crawford. In 1948, Knudsen ventured into a different genre of film, doing comedy instead of drama and leaving Warner Bros. to do freelance work. She also took vocal lessons from Kay Thompson. Despite appearing in big budget features with established stars, Knudsen's career never took off and she was relegated to smaller roles in B movies. Her last film role was in the 1957 film Istanbul with Errol Flynn.

=== Radio ===
Knudsen played Lois Graves in the radio version of Junior Miss, Karen Adams in Woman in White. and Phillipa on The Bill Goodwin Show.

=== Television ===
Knudsen played April Adams in the comedy So This Is Hollywood on NBC (1955). She also had roles in pilots for two programs – Do Not Disturb and Howie – which did not develop into series. In the 1950s and 1960s, Knudsen appeared in guest-starring roles on several television shows. She made two guest appearances on Perry Mason in 1958–1959; one as Sheila Bowers in "The Case of the Gilded Lily," and Marie Chapman in "The Case of the Spurious Sister." Other television appearances included Alfred Hitchcock Presents, The Millionaire, Tombstone Territory, The Life and Legend of Wyatt Earp (as 'Kansas Lily'), Pete and Gladys and three times on Bat Masterson (as "Louisa Carey" in 1959, as "Katie" in 1960 and as "Lottie Tremaine" in 1961). After appearing in an episode of The Adventures of Ozzie & Harriet in 1965, Knudsen retired from acting.

== Personal life and death ==
Knudsen's first marriage was to Adrian Samish, a radio executive. The two eloped after Knudsen's June 1942 performance in My Sister Eileen and went to Media, Pennsylvania, to marry. They divorced in 1946. On June 15, 1949, Knudsen married Jim Jordan Jr. in Los Angeles. They had three daughters together. Jordan was the son of Jim and Marian Jordan, better known as Fibber McGee and Molly. The couple divorced in 1960. On February 12, 1962, Knudsen married Francis S. Kellstrom, an electrical contractor. They separated that July and were divorced October 22, 1962.

She suffered from crippling arthritis for most of her later years and was cared for by her close friend, actress Jennifer Jones. Her grandson is the Hollywood screenwriter John Orloff. On July 11, 1980, Knudsen died of cancer in Encino, California, aged 57.

== Recognition ==
For her contribution to the television industry, Knudsen has a star on the Hollywood Walk of Fame at 6262 Hollywood Boulevard.

== Filmography ==
- A Stolen Life (1946) - Diedre
- Two Guys from Milwaukee (1946) - Juke-Box Voice (voice, uncredited)
- The Big Sleep (1946) - Mona Mars
- Shadow of a Woman (1946) - Louise Ryder
- Never Say Goodbye (1946) - Nancy Graham
- Humoresque (1946) - Florence Boray
- The Unfaithful (1947) - Claire
- Stallion Road (1947) - Daisy Otis
- Roses Are Red (1947) - Martha McCormack
- My Wild Irish Rose (1947) - Eileen - Leading Lady (uncredited)
- Perilous Waters (1948) - Pat Ferris
- Half Past Midnight (1948) - Sally Ferris, alias Sally Parker
- Trouble Preferred (1948) - Dale Kent
- Copper Canyon (1950) - Cora
- Unchained (1955) - Elaine
- Betrayed Women (1955) - Nora Collins
- Good Morning, Miss Dove (1955) - Billie Jean Green
- The Bottom of the Bottle (1956) - Ellen Miller
- Hilda Crane (1956) - Nell Bromley
- Istanbul (1957) - Marge Boyle

=== Television ===
- Your Show Time (1 episode, 1949)
- Racket Squad (1 episode, 1951) - Julie
- Mr. and Mrs. North (2 episodes, 1953) - Elsie Dargon / Sally Kovack
- The Pepsi-Cola Playhouse (1 episode, 1954)
- City Detective (1 episode, 1955) - Denise
- The Loretta Young Show (1 episode, 1955) - Madeleine
- So This is Hollywood (Unknown episodes, 1955) - April Adams
- Alfred Hitchcock Presents (1956) (Season 1 Episode 19: "The Derelicts") - Herta Cowell
- The Millionaire (1 episode, 1956) - Irene Borden
- The Gale Storm Show (1 episode, 1956) - Flo
- Panic! (1 episode, 1957) - Kit Dutton
- The Joseph Cotten Show (1 episode, 1957) - Mona
- The Ford Television Theatre (1 episode, 1957) - Susan Davenport
- The Thin Man (1 episode, 1957) - Blonde / Sandra Storm
- The Life and Legend of Wyatt Earp (1 episode, 1958) - Lilly Reeve
- The Real McCoys (1 episode, 1958) - Miss Eberle
- Tombstone Territory (1 episode, 1959) - Amy Ward
- Perry Mason (2 episodes, 1958–1959) - Marie Chapman / Sheila Bowers
- Tightrope (1 episode, 1959) - Helen Stevens
- General Electric Theater (1 episode, 1960) - Irene Martin
- Pete and Gladys (1 episode, 1960) - Mrs. Valenti
- Bat Masterson (3 episodes, 1959–1961) - Lottie Tremaine / Katie / Louisa Carey
- The Wonderful World of Disney (1 episode, 1961) - Nellie
- The Adventures of Ozzie and Harriet (3 episodes, 1960–1965) - Mrs. Frazer / Mrs. Kelley / Mrs. Masters (final appearance)
