= John Reinhardt (director) =

American actor and screenwriter (1901–1953)

- Born: 24 February 1901; Vienna, Austria-Hungary
- Died: 6 August 1953 (aged 52); West Berlin, West Germany
- Occupations: Director, screenwriter, actor
- Years active: 1928–1953

John Reinhardt (1901–1953) was an Austrian actor, screenwriter, and film director. He worked for a number of years in Mexico, where he directed the 1948 American Cold War thriller Sofia. He was married to American screenwriter Elizabeth Reinhardt.

== Selected filmography ==
=== Actor ===
- The Climax (1930)
- The Dance Goes On (1930)
- Six Hours to Live (1932)

=== Director ===
- El día que me quieras (1935)
- Captain Calamity (1936)
- Tengo fe en ti (1940)
- The Guilty (1947)
- High Tide (1947)
- For You I Die (1947)
- Sofia (1948)
- Open Secret (1948)
- Chicago Calling (1951)
- Mailman Mueller (1953)
- They Call It Love (1953)

=== Screenwriter ===
- The River Pirate (1928)
- Primavera en otoño (1933)
- Nothing More Than a Woman (1934)
- Prescription for Romance (1937)
- Rascals (1938)
- Tower of Terror (1941)

== Bibliography ==
- Shapiro, Jerome F. Atomic Bomb Cinema: The Apocalyptic Imagination on Film. Routledge, 2013.
