= Roses Are Red (film) =

1947 film by James Tinling

- Directed by: James Tinling
- Written by: Irving Elman
- Produced by: Sol M. Wurtzel
- Starring: Don Castle; Peggy Knudsen; Patricia Knight
- Cinematography: Benjamin H. Kline
- Edited by: Frank Baldridge
- Music by: Rudy Schrager
- Distributed by: 20th Century Fox
- Release date: November 10, 1947 (United States)
- Running time: 67 minutes
- Country: United States
- Language: English

Roses Are Red is a 1947 American film noir crime drama film directed by James Tinling, featuring film stars Don Castle and Peggy Knudsen.

The film features an early performance by Jeff Chandler as a gangster.

== Cast ==
- Don Castle as Robert A. Thorne/Don Carney
- Peggy Knudsen as Martha McCormack
- Patricia Knight as Jill Carney
- Joe Sawyer as Police Lt. Rocky Wall
- Edward Keane as Jim Locke
- Jeff Chandler as John Jones aka The Knuckle
- Charles McGraw as Duke Arno
- Charles Lane as Lipton
- Paul Guilfoyle as George "Buster" Cooley
- Douglas Fowley as Ace Oliver
- James Arness as Ray (credited as James Aurness)
