= Regis Toomey =

American actor (1898–1991)

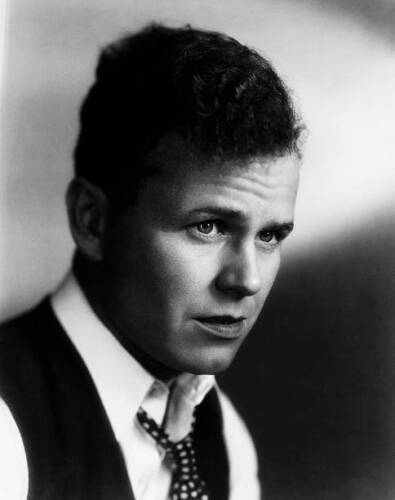
- Born: John Francis Regis Toomey; August 13, 1898; Pittsburgh, Pennsylvania, U.S.
- Died: October 12, 1991 (aged 93); Los Angeles, California, U.S.
- Education: University of Pittsburgh
- Occupation: Actor
- Years active: 1929–1987
- Spouse: Kathryn Scott Toomey (m. 1925; died 1981)
- Children: 2

John Francis Regis Toomey (August 13, 1898 – October 12, 1991) was an American film and television actor.

== Early life ==
Born in Pittsburgh, Pennsylvania, he was one of four children of Francis X. and Mary Ellen Toomey, and attended Peabody High School. He initially pondered a law career, but acting won out and he established himself as a musical stage performer.

== Career ==
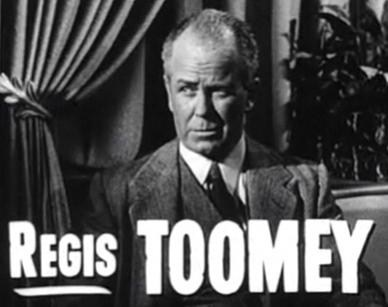
Trailer for Cry Danger (1951)

Educated in dramatics at the University of Pittsburgh, where he became a brother of Sigma Chi, Toomey began as a stock actor and eventually made it to Broadway. Toomey was a singer on stage until throat problems (acute laryngitis) while touring in Europe stopped that aspect of his career. In 1929, he appeared in his first films, starting out as a leading man, but finding more success as a character actor, sans his toupee.

In 1941, Toomey appeared in You're in the Army Now, with Jane Wyman. In the same year, Toomey appeared in Meet John Doe where he makes a key speech in front of Gary Cooper.

In 1956, Toomey was cast as the Reverend Arnold Grumm in the episode "Lifeline" of the religion anthology series Crossroads. Toomey appeared in a number of episodes of Richard Diamond, Private Detective as Lt. McGough.

About this time, he appeared on the NBC Western series The Tall Man, starring Barry Sullivan and Clu Gulager. He also made two guest appearances on Perry Mason, including the role of murderer Sam Crane in the 1960 episode "The Case of the Loquacious Liar", and as Andy Grant in the 1965 episode "The Case of the 12th Wildcat".

From 1963 to 1966, Toomey was one of the stars of the ABC crime drama Burke's Law, starring Gene Barry. He played Sergeant Les Hart, one of the detectives assisting the murder investigations of the millionaire police captain Amos Burke. Toomey also appeared in the CBS western series Rawhide episode "Incident of the Tinkers Dam" as TJ Wishbone. He guest-starred on dozens of television programs, including the popular "Shady Deal at Sunny Acres" episode of ABC's Maverick.

In 1968, after the death of Bea Benaderet, who played Kate Bradley, Toomey played a transitional role in the CBS series Petticoat Junction. Appearing as Dr. Stuart, who cared for the citizens of Hooterville, the character decided to take on a partner in his medical practice. Dr. Janet Craig, played by June Lockhart, was introduced as the new female lead for the show in the episode "The Lady Doctor".

== Death ==
Toomey died at age 93 on October 12, 1991, while in residence at the Motion Picture & Television Country House and Hospital, in Woodland Hills, California.

== Selected filmography ==
- Alibi (1929) as Danny McGann
- The Wheel of Life (1929) as Lt. MacLaren
- Illusion (1929) as Eric Schmittlap
- Rich People (1929) as Jef MacLean
- Street of Chance (1930) as 'Babe' Marsden
- Framed (1930) as Jimmy McArthur
- Crazy That Way (1930) as Robert Metcalf
- The Light of Western Stars (1930) as Bob Drexell
- Shadow of the Law (1930) as Tom Owens
- Good Intentions (1930) as Richard Holt
- A Man from Wyoming (1930) as Jersey
- Other Men's Women (1931) as Jack
- Scandal Sheet (1931) as Regan
- Finn and Hattie (1931) as Henry Collins
- The Finger Points (1931) as Charlie 'Breezy' Russell
- Kick In (1931) as Chick Hewes
- Murder by the Clock (1931) as Officer Cassidy
- Graft (1931) as Dustin Hotchkiss
- 24 Hours (1931) as Tony 'Sicily' Bruzzi
- Touchdown (1931) as Tom Hussey
- Under Eighteen (1931) as Jimmie Slocum
- Shopworn (1932) as David Livingston
- Midnight Patrol (1932) as John Martin
- The Crowd Roars (1932) as Dick Wilbur (uncredited)
- They Never Come Back (1932) as Jimmy Nolan
- A Strange Adventure (1932) as Detective-Sergeant Mitchell
- The Penal Code (1932) as Robert Palmer
- State Trooper (1933) as Michael Rolph
- Soldiers of the Storm (1933) as Brad Allerton
- Laughing at Life (1933) as Pat Collins / Mc Hale
- She Had to Say Yes (1933) as Tommy Nelson
- Big Time or Bust (1933) as Jimmy Kane
- What's Your Racket? (1934) as Bert Miller
- Picture Brides (1934) as Dave Hart
- Murder on the Blackboard (1934) as Detective Smiley North
- She Had to Choose (1934) as Jack Berry
- Redhead (1934) as Scoop
- Red Morning (1934) – John Hastings
- Shadow of Doubt (1935) as Reed Ryan
- Great God Gold (1935) as Phil Stuart
- G Men (1935) as Eddie Buchanan
- One Frightened Night (1935) as Tom Dean
- Manhattan Moon (1935) as Eddie
- Shadows of the Orient (1935) as Inspector Bob Baxter
- Reckless Roads (1935) as Speed Demming
- Bars of Hate (1935) as Ted Clark
- Skull and Crown (1935) as Bob Franklin
- Bulldog Edition (1936) as Jim Hardy
- Midnight Taxi (1937) as Hilton
- The Lady Escapes (1937) as American Reporter (uncredited)
- Big City (1937) as Fred Hawkins
- Back in Circulation (1937) as Buck
- Submarine D-1 (1937) as Tom Callan
- The Invisible Menace (1938) as Lt. Matthews
- Island in the Sky (1938) as Joe – Reporter (uncredited)
- Blind Alibi (1938) as Doctor Wilson – Veterinarian (uncredited)
- Hunted Men (1938) as Donovan (uncredited)
- Passport Husband (1938) as G-Man (uncredited)
- Illegal Traffic (1938) as Windy
- His Exciting Night (1938) as Bill Stewart
- Smashing the Spy Ring (1938) as Ted Hall
- Pirates of the Skies (1939) as Pilot Bill Lambert
- The Mysterious Miss X (1939) as Jack Webster
- Wings of the Navy (1939) as First Flight Instructor
- Society Smugglers (1939) as Johnny Beebe
- Street of Missing Men (1939) as Jim Parker
- Confessions of a Nazi Spy (1939) as Tom - in Coffee Shop (uncredited)
- Union Pacific (1939) as Paddy O'Rourke
- Trapped in the Sky (1939) as Lt. Gary
- Indianapolis Speedway (1939) as Dick Wilbur
- Hidden Power (1939) as Mayton
- Thunder Afloat (1939) as Ives
- The Phantom Creeps (1939) as Jim Daly
- His Girl Friday (1940) as Sanders
- Northwest Passage (1940) as Webster
- 'Til We Meet Again (1940) as Freddy
- North West Mounted Police (1940) as Constable Jerry Moore
- Arizona (1940) as Grant Oury
- The Lone Wolf Takes a Chance (1941) as Wallace (uncredited)
- Meet John Doe (1941) as Bert
- The Devil and Miss Jones (1941) as 1st Policeman
- A Shot in the Dark (1941) as William Ryder
- Reaching for the Sun (1941) as Interne
- The Nurse's Secret (1941) as Inspector Tom Patten
- Dive Bomber (1941) as Tim Griffin
- Law of the Tropics (1941) as Tom Marshall
- New York Town (1941) as Jim Martin (uncredited)
- They Died with Their Boots On (1941) as Fitzhugh Lee
- You're in the Army Now (1941) as Captain Radcliffe
- Bullet Scars (1942) as Dr. Steven Bishop
- I Was Framed (1942) as Bob Leeds
- The Forest Rangers (1942) as Frank Hatfield
- Tennessee Johnson (1942) as Blackstone McDaniel
- Tornado (1943) as Narrator (uncredited)
- Destroyer (1943) as Lt. Cmdr. Clark
- Adventures of the Flying Cadets (1943) as Capt. Ralph Carson
- Jack London (1943) as Scratch Nelson
- Phantom Lady (1944) as Detective
- Follow the Boys (1944) as Dr. Henderson
- Song of the Open Road (1944) as Connors
- Raiders of Ghost City (1944, Serial) as Captain Clay Randolph [Chs. 1–6]
- The Doughgirls (1944) as Timothy Walsh as FBI Agent
- Dark Mountain (1944) as Steve Downey
- When the Lights Go On Again (1944) as Bill Regan as Reporter
- Murder in the Blue Room (1944) as Inspector McDonald
- Betrayal from the East (1945) as Agent Posing - 'Sgt. Jimmy Scott'
- Strange Illusion (1945) as Dr. Vincent
- Spellbound (1945) as Det. Sgt. Gillespie
- Follow That Woman (1945) as Barney Manners
- Mysterious Intruder (1946) as James Summers
- The Big Sleep (1946) as Chief Inspector Bernie Ohls
- Her Sister's Secret (1946) as Bill Gordon
- Sister Kenny (1946) as New York Reporter (uncredited)
- Child of Divorce (1946) as Ray Carter
- The Thirteenth Hour (1947) as Don Parker
- The Guilty (1947) as Detective Heller
- The Big Fix (1947) as Lt. Brenner
- High Tide (1947) as Inspector O'Haffey
- Magic Town (1947) as Ed Weaver
- The Bishop's Wife (1947) as Mr. Miller
- Reaching from Heaven (1948) as Pastor
- I Wouldn't Be in Your Shoes (1948) as Police Inspector Clint Judd
- Raw Deal (1948) as Police (uncredited)
- Station West (1948) as Goddard
- The Boy with Green Hair (1948) as Mr. Davis
- Mighty Joe Young (1949) as John Young
- Come to the Stable (1949) as Monsignor Talbot
- The Devil's Henchman (1949) as Tip Banning
- Beyond the Forest (1949) as Sorren
- Dynamite Pass (1950) as Dan Madden
- Undercover Girl (1950) as Hank Miller
- Again Pioneers (1950) as Dave Harley
- Mrs. O'Malley and Mr. Malone (1950) as Reporter in Light Jacket (uncredited)
- Frenchie (1950) as Carter
- Tomahawk (1951) as Smith (uncredited)
- Cry Danger (1951) as Cobb
- Navy Bound (1951) as Capt. Charles Danning
- Show Boat (1951) as Sheriff Ike Vallon (uncredited)
- The Tall Target (1951) as Insp. Tim Reilly (uncredited)
- The People Against O'Hara (1951) as Fred Colton, Police Sound Man
- The Battle at Apache Pass (1952) as Dr. Carter
- My Six Convicts (1952) as Dr. Gordon
- Just for You (1952) as Mr. Hodges
- My Pal Gus (1952) as Farley Norris
- Never Wave at a WAC (1953) as Gen. Ned Prager
- It Happens Every Thursday (1953) as Mayor Hull
- Son of Belle Starr (1953) as Tom Wren
- Island in the Sky (1953) as Sgt. Harper
- Main Street to Broadway (1953) as Desk Sergeant (uncredited)
- Take the High Ground! (1953) as Chaplain (uncredited)
- The Nebraskan (1953) as Col. Markham
- The High and the Mighty (1954) as Tim Garfield
- Drums Across the River (1954) as Sheriff Jim Beal
- The Human Jungle (1954) as Det. Bob Geddes
- Guys and Dolls (1955) as Arvide Abernathy
- Top Gun (1955) as Jim O'Hara
- Great Day in the Morning (1956) as Father Murphy
- Three for Jamie Dawn (1956) as 'Murph'
- Dakota Incident (1956) as Minstrel
- Curfew Breakers (1957) as Coach Bettger
- Sing, Boy, Sing (1958) as Rev. Easton
- Joy Ride (1958) as Miles
- Shady Deal at Sunny Acres (1958) as Ben Granville
- The Hangman (1959) as Orderly (uncredited)
- Warlock (1959) as Skinner
- Guns of the Timberland (1960) as Sheriff Taylor
- The Last Sunset (1961) as Milton Wing
- The Big Bankroll (1961) as Bill Baird
- Voyage to the Bottom of the Sea (1961) as Dr. Jamieson
- The Errand Boy (1961) as Studio Exec with the Baron
- Man's Favorite Sport? (1964) as Bagley
- The Night of the Grizzly (1966) as Cotton Benson
- Gunn (1967) as The Bishop
- Change of Habit (1969) as Father Gibbons
- The Out-of-Towners (1970) as Pilot on Airliner to New York
- Cover Me Babe (1970) as Michael
- The Carey Treatment (1972) as Sanderson the Pathologist
- The Phantom of Hollywood (1974, TV Movie) as Joe
- Won Ton Ton, the Dog Who Saved Hollywood (1976) as Burlesque Stagehand
- C.H.O.M.P.S. (1979) as Chief Patterson
- Evil Town (1987) as Doc Hooper
