= Strike It Rich (1948 film) =

1948 film directed by Lesley Selander

- Directed by: Lesley Selander
- Written by: Francis Rosenwald; Henry J. Staudigl
- Produced by: Jack Wrather
- Starring: Rod Cameron; Bonita Granville; Don Castle
- Cinematography: Henry Sharp
- Edited by: William H. Ziegler
- Music by: Rudy Schrager
- Production company: Jack Wrather Productions
- Distributed by: Allied Artists Pictures
- Release date: December 1, 1948
- Running time: 81 minutes
- Country: United States
- Language: English

Strike It Rich is a 1948 American comedy film directed by Lesley Selander and starring Rod Cameron, Bonita Granville and Don Castle.

It was partly shot on location around Lindale, Texas.

== Cast ==
- Rod Cameron as Duke Massey
- Bonita Granville as Julie Ann Brady
- Don Castle as William 'Tex' Warren
- Stuart Erwin as Delbart Lane
- Lloyd Corrigan as Matt Brady
- Ellen Corby as Mrs. Annie Harkins
- Emory Parnell as Carlton
- Harry Tyler as 'Pop' Jonathan
- Virginia Dale as Mabel
- William Haade as Bull
- Edward Gargan as Mack - the Bartender
- Robert Dudley as Pop - the Postmaster

== Bibliography ==
- Martin, Len D. The Allied Artists Checklist: The Feature Films and Short Subjects of Allied Artists Pictures Corporation, 1947-1978. McFarland & Company, 1993.
- Stephens, Michael L. Art Directors in Cinema: A Worldwide Biographical Dictionary. McFarland, 1998.
