= Half Past Midnight =

1948 film by William F. Claxton

- Theatrical release poster
- Directed by: William F. Claxton
- Written by: Arnold Belgard
- Produced by: Sol M. Wurtzel
- Starring: Kent Taylor; Peggy Knudsen
- Cinematography: Benjamin H. Kline
- Edited by: Frank Baldridge
- Music by: Darrell Calker
- Distributed by: 20th Century Fox
- Release date: March 1948
- Running time: 69 minutes
- Country: United States
- Language: English

Half Past Midnight is a 1948 American comedy murder mystery film. It was William F. Claxton's first directed feature after eight years as a film editor.

== Plot ==
Kent Taylor plays a man who meets a dancer in a nightclub. She's implicated in a killing, and he's drawn into escaping from the police with her through Chinatown as they seek the real murderer.

== Cast ==
- Kent Taylor as Wade Hamilton
- Peggy Knudsen as Sally Ferris / Sally Parker
- Joe Sawyer as Detective Nash
- Walter Sande as Detective MacDonald
- Martin Kosleck as Cortez
- Mabel Paige as Hester Thornwall
- Gil Stratton as Chick Patrick
- Jean Wong as Blossom Gow
- Jane Everett as Carlotta Evans
- Damian O'Flynn as Murray Evans
- Richard Loo as Lee Gow
- Tom Dugan as Bus Tour Guide
- Jean De Briac as Nightclub Headwaiter
- Willie Best as Nightclub Janitor
- Victor Sen Yung as Hotel Porter
