= Perilous Waters =

1948 film directed by Jack Bernhard

- Theatrical release poster
- Directed by: Jack Bernhard
- Screenplay by: Richard Wormser; Francis Rosenwald
- Based on: Quest of William Hunter by Leon Ware
- Produced by: Jack Wrather
- Starring: Don Castle; Audrey Long; Peggy Knudsen; Samuel S. Hinds; Gloria Holden; John Miljan
- Cinematography: Henry Sharp
- Edited by: Stewart S. Frye
- Music by: Rudy Schrager
- Production company: Monogram Pictures
- Distributed by: Monogram Pictures
- Release date: February 14, 1948
- Running time: 66 minutes
- Country: United States
- Language: English

Perilous Waters is a 1948 American drama film directed by Jack Bernhard and written by Richard Wormser and Francis Rosenwald. The film stars Don Castle, Audrey Long, Peggy Knudsen, Samuel S. Hinds, Gloria Holden and John Miljan. The film was released on February 14, 1948 by Monogram Pictures.

== Cast ==
- Don Castle as Willie Hunter
- Audrey Long as Judy Gage
- Peggy Knudsen as Pat Ferris
- Samuel S. Hinds as Dana Ferris
- Gloria Holden as Mrs. Ferris
- John Miljan as Carter Larkin
- Walter Sande as Franklin
- Stanley Andrews as Capt. Porter
- Cy Kendall as The Boss
- Gene Garrick as Fred
- George Ramsey as Bart
- Mike Killian as Brooks
- Julian Rivero as Fisherman
