= The Last Round-Up (1947 film) =

1947 film by John English

- Directed by: John English
- Screenplay by: Jack Townley
- Story by: Jack Townley; Earle Snell
- Produced by: Armand Schaefer
- Starring: Gene Autry; Champion
- Cinematography: William Bradford
- Edited by: Aaron Stell
- Music by: Mischa Bakaleinikoff (uncredited); Joseph Dubin (uncredited); Paul Sawtell (uncredited)
- Color process: Black and white
- Production company: Gene Autry Productions
- Distributed by: Columbia Pictures
- Release date: November 5, 1947
- Running time: 77 minutes
- Country: United States
- Language: English

The Last Round-Up is a 1947 American Western film, directed by John English and starring Gene Autry and Champion.

== Plot ==
A rancher tries to convince an Indian tribe to relocate, so their land can be used to provide water for Kansas City.

== Cast ==
- Gene Autry as Gene Autry
- Champion as Champ, Gene's Horse
- Jean Heather as Carol Taylor
- Ralph Morgan as Charlie Mason
- Carol Thurston as Lydia Henry
- Mark Daniels as Matt Mason
- Robert Blake as Mike Henry (as Bobby Blake)
- Russ Vincent as Jeff Henry
- The Texas Rangers as Singing Quartette

== See also ==
- List of American films of 1947

== Bibliography ==
- Holly George-Warren. Public Cowboy No. 1: The Life and Times of Gene Autry. Oxford University Press, 2009.
