= The Guilty (1947 film) =

1947 film by John Reinhardt

- Theatrical film poster
- Directed by: John Reinhardt
- Screenplay by: Robert Presnell Sr.
- Based on: "He Looked Like Murder"; 1941 story in Detective Fiction Weekly by Cornell Woolrich
- Produced by: Jack Wrather
- Starring: Bonita Granville; Don Castle; Regis Toomey
- Cinematography: Henry Sharp
- Edited by: Jodie Copelan
- Music by: Rudy Schrager
- Distributed by: Monogram Pictures
- Release date: March 2, 1947 (United States)
- Running time: 71 minutes
- Country: United States
- Language: English
- Budget: $120,000

The Guilty is a 1947 American film noir directed by John Reinhardt, based on Cornell Woolrich's short story "He Looked Like Murder". The film was produced by oil millionaire Jack Wrather, the husband of lead actress Bonita Granville.

== Plot ==
Mike Carr and Johnny Dixon are roommates. After many months Mike returns to his old neighborhood and goes into Tim McGinnis’ bar to wait for Estelle Mitchell, a woman he hasn't seen since soon after her twin sister Linda was murdered. He sits down and starts having flashbacks of the events around Linda's death.

Johnny had been dating Estelle until he discovered that she was seeing other men. He dumped her and began a relationship with her sweet twin, Linda.

Due to a head injury he had suffered during the war, Johnny experienced regular nervous breakdowns. He and Mike served in the army together and, being roommates, Mike nursed him through these.

Johnny and Linda were very much in love, but Estelle wanted him back and was determined to break up the happy couple. In the meantime, she was seeing Mike, who had a hard time resisting her vampy style.

But the twins both wanted Johnny, and one night they got into a fight over him, after which Linda went to see Johnny. Estelle tried to intercept and get to Johnny's first.

Mike sees Estelle arrive before Linda and stops her from coming between the two lovers. However, when Mike returns to his apartment alone a couple of hours later, Estelle telephones Mike from her home, at her mother's request, to say that Linda never came home and has been reported missing.

Mike finds Johnny, drunk and distraught. He begs Mike to verify his alibi - that Linda had left his and Mike's place after an argument with Johnny, and that he heard Linda whistle for, and then saw her get into, a taxi.

When the police arrive at the scene they find a buckle from Linda's trench-coat on Johnny's apartment floor and, after finding Linda's body in the apartment building, they take Johnny in for questioning.

Searching for clues in the men's room of McGinnis' bar, Mike finds another buckle outside its window. He goes to Johnny and suggests the possibility that Johnny's memory might have failed him the night of the murder. While they are talking, the police arrive to arrest Johnny and he panics. Mike helps his friend by letting him escape out the back.

In order to persuade Mike to give Johnny up, Detective Heller takes Mike to the morgue to show him Linda's body. Heller then recounts the horrible details of Linda's death: After being choked, Linda was pushed, still alive, into the chute of the trash incinerator, and when he was unable to fit her in the tight space, the murderer shoved her in and broke her neck. The murderer then pulled her out and put her in a barrel on the roof.

Mike is disgusted by this, but still doesn't believe his friend murdered Linda. After disarming Johnny (who bought had bought a revolver with money Mike had given him to get by on while in hiding) he convinces him to come forward and clear his name. As they arrive home, Estelle is waiting for them with an older, possessive man named Alex Tremholt, who has been renting a room at the Mitchells' since the twins were young.

While they are there, Mike hears a woman whistle for a taxi, and realizes it must be the same one Johnny heard the night of the murder. Mike gives Tremholt the revolver and leaves to check on the whistler. When Tremholt insists on calling the police to arrest Johnny, he manages to escape once more. Detective Heller arrives and suspects Tremholt of having a long-standing, unrequited love for Estelle and of killing the innocent Linda, whom he mistook for Estelle, the object of his desire. With the truth being revealed, Mike hurries off to tell Johnny he is in the clear and cuts him down after nearly hanging himself.

Back in the present, Estelle shows up at McGinnis' and Mike drags her to his old apartment and insinuates that she committed the murder. When he enters the flat, however, Heller is waiting to arrest him. The detective reveals that Jake, the apartment janitor, recently found Linda's necklace in the incinerator chute with Mike's fingerprints all over it. It turns out that Mike killed Linda, believing she was Estelle. After telling Mike that he only held Tremholt to fool Mike he was in the clear, Heller accompanies him down the stairs and past Estelle into the night.

== Cast ==
- Bonita Granville as Estelle Mitchell/Linda Mitchell
- Don Castle as Mike Carr
- Regis Toomey as Detective Heller
- John Litel as Alex Tremholt
- Wally Cassell as Johnny Dixon
- Thomas E. Jackson as Tim McGinnis
- Netta Packer as Mrs. Mitchell

== Production ==
Jack Wrather was on vacation in Los Angeles where he met his old roommate, Castle, who was struggling in Hollywood after World War II. They wired author Woolrich asking how much the film rights were for his short story, "He Looked Like Murder". Following Woolrich's response, Wrather set up Jack Wrather Productions. Filming was completed in eight days.

== Reception ==
=== Box office ===
The film was successful, generating a more than 200% return to Wrather.

=== Critical response ===
In a 2004 review film critic Dennis Schwartz gave the film a somewhat positive review, writing, "John Reinhardt economically directs a crisp crime thriller from the screenplay by Robert R. Presnell Sr. that is based on the short story "He Looked Like Murder" by Cornell Woolrich. Though the surprise ending is hardly convincing or for that matter original (Robert Siodmak's The Dark Mirror covered the same territory of identical twins in a superior fashion), and the acting was rather stiff, nevertheless this cheapie Monogram flick always kept me interested in the twisty plot and was quite engaging as it adequately covered the film noir conventions of following the dark sides of the main characters."
