= Thunder Afloat =

1939 film by George B. Seitz

- Directed by: George B. Seitz
- Written by: Ralph Wheelwright; Harvey S. Haislip
- Screenplay by: Harvey S. Haislip; Wells Root
- Produced by: J. Walter Ruben
- Starring: Wallace Beery; Chester Morris; Virginia Grey
- Cinematography: John F. Seitz
- Edited by: Frank E. Hull
- Music by: David Snell; Edward Ward
- Distributed by: Metro-Goldwyn-Mayer
- Release date: September 15, 1939
- Running time: 95 minutes
- Country: United States
- Language: English
- Budget: $1,000,000 (estimated)

Thunder Afloat is a 1939 World War I naval film starring Wallace Beery and Chester Morris. The movie was directed by George B. Seitz.

== Plot ==
Wallace Berry as Pop Thorson

In the 1910s, Pop Thorson (Wallace Beery) is the owner/operator of a tug boat in a New England seaside town. His adult daughter Susan (Virginia Grey) normally lives with him on the tugboat. However, at the start of the film, Pop's tugboat has sunk in the shallow water of the dock.

Rocky Blake (Chester Morris) is a rival tugboat owner in the town. Pop believes, without any proof, that Rocky sabotaged his tug to keep him from winning a lucrative contract to move barges of military supplies. Rocky denies the allegation. Susan loves her father and likes Rocky. She does not want them to fight.

As the United States has now entered World War I, the United States Navy is recruiting men for anti-submarine warfare. Susan and Pop trick Rocky into enlisting in the Navy by pretending Thorson is going to enlist himself. Thorson then gets the Navy contract. After refloating his tug boat, Pop is towing a barge when he encounters a German U-boat. The Germans force the barge and tug crews into their lifeboats, then sinks the two vessels.

When Pop reaches port, he immediately enlists in the Navy. Due to his experience and the war emergency, the Navy immediately commissions him an ensign and gives him command of a sub chaser. To his dismay, Pop discovers that Rocky, now a lieutenant in charge of the sub chaser squadron, is his superior officer. Thorson does not take well to naval discipline, particularly from Rocky. He respects Thorson's experience and tries to teach him how to behave, but has little time. Pop is not listening.

The Navy then orders Rocky to take his squadron off the coast of Southeastern Massachusetts to search for the U-boat. The weather forecast for the patrol area is for thunderstorms. However, Thorson believes that the U-boat is going to shelter on the leeward side of Nantucket Island. Eager to get the U-boat that sank his tugboat, Pop disobeys orders and heads to Nantucket.

Reaching the island, Pop finds the U-boat on the surface and attacks him. The U-boat dives and releases some oil, making Pop think that it has been destroyed. The inexperienced Thorson breaks off his attack. Before the leaving the area, the U-boat torpedoes a lightship, making it clear that it was not damaged. A cable then breaks on Pop's vessel and tangles in the propeller. Thorson jumps into the water to free it, but suffers a concussion. Arriving on the scene, Rocky jumps into the ocean and rescues Pop. A few days later, back at the base, Pop is court-martialed for disobeying orders. The Naval court demotes him to ordinary seaman confines him to shore duty. A devastated Pop decides to desert from the Navy and flee to Canada.

However, Rocky stops Pop just in time and offers him an alternative. He will now join the crew of a decoy ship that is outfitted like an ordinary fishing schooner. Its crew will pretend to be fishermen. Its mission is to lure the U-boat into a trap; the decoy ship has a concealed radio to summon the sub chasers as needed.

The decoy ship then joins a fishing fleet out at sea. When they spot the U-boat, the crew transmits the news to the sub chaser squadron. The Germans board the decoy, but after discovering the radio, they quickly return to the U-boat so that it can dive. With his captain's agreement, Pop orders the decoy ship to try to ram the U-boat. However, the maneuver is unsuccessful and the U-boat sinks the decoy ship with its deck gun.

The Germans haul Pop out of the ocean into captivity. The U-boat then dives to the seabed. As they wait silently, Pop locks himself inside a compartment and starts banging on the hull with a wrench. This alerts the listening sub chasers to the U-boat location. The sub chasers then launch depth charges to hit the U-boat. It is severely damaged and forced to surface. The American sailors board the U-boat, take the German crew prisoner and free Pop.

At the end of the film, the Navy is holding a ceremony to give Pop the Congressional Medal of Honor for heroism. They restore him to the rank of ensign, and again put him in command of a sub chaser.

== Production ==
The submarine sequences were shot with the cooperation of the U. S. Navy at Annapolis, Maryland, and around the Coronado Islands off San Diego, California. Scenes were also filmed at San Pedro, California.

== Cast ==
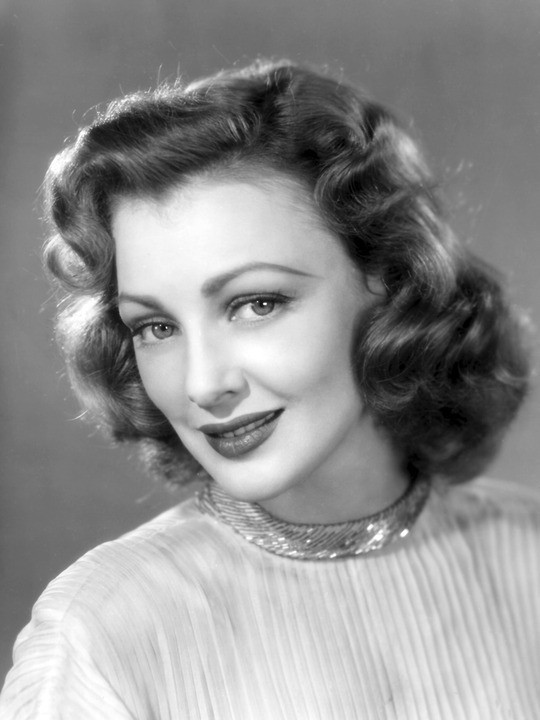
Virginia Grey as Susan Thorson

- Wallace Beery as Pop Thorson
- Chester Morris as Rocky Blake
- Virginia Grey as Susan Thorson
- Douglass Dumbrille as District Commander
- Carl Esmond as U-boat Captain
- Clem Bevans as Cap Finch
- John Qualen as Milo
- Regis Toomey as Ives
- Leon Ames as Recruiting Officer
