= Lea Jacobs =

American film historian (born 1957)

- Born: January 12, 1957 (age 69); Passaic, New Jersey, U.S.
- Occupation: Historian
- Awards: Guggenheim Fellowship (2002)

Academic background
- Education: University of California, San Diego; University of California, Los Angeles
- Thesis: Reforming the fallen woman cycle: strategies of film censorship, 1930-1940 (1986)

Academic work
- Sub-discipline: American film
- Institutions: University of Wisconsin–Madison

Lea Jacobs (born January 12, 1957) is an American film historian, author of The Wages of Sin (1991), Theatre to Cinema (1997), The Decline of Sentiment (2008), Film Rhythm After Sound (2015) and John Ford at Work (2025). She is professor emeritus of film at the University of Wisconsin–Madison, Department of Communication Arts.

== Biography ==
Lea Jacobs was born on January 12, 1957, in Passaic, New Jersey. After obtaining a BA in University of California, San Diego in 1977, she did graduate studies at the University of California, Los Angeles, obtaining an MA in 1981 and PhD in 1986. Her doctoral dissertation, Reforming the fallen woman cycle: strategies of film censorship, 1930-1940, was supervised by Janet Bergstrom.

After working at the Rockefeller Foundation as a postdoctoral fellow from 1987 to 1988, Jacobs joined the University of Wisconsin–Madison, as an assistant professor of communication arts. She was promoted to associate professor in 1994 and full professor in 1999, eventually becoming professor emeritus. She was a 1994 fellow of UW Madison's Institute for Research in the Humanities, a 2002 Guggenheim fellow, and a 2010-2011 American Council of Learned Societies Fellow. In 2013, she became Associate Vice-chancellor for Arts and Humanities at UW Madison.

As an academic, Jacobs focuses on American film. She has written four books: The Wages of Sin (1991) on the evolution of fallen women cinema due to Hollywood censorship; Theatre to Cinema (1997; co-authored with Ben Brewster), on the relationship between stage visual effects and their early film counterparts; The Decline of Sentiment (2008), on the change of values in 1920s American film; and Film Rhythm After Sound (2015), on the history of film technology during the transition between silent film and sound. Her next book, John Ford at Work, examines the career of John Ford in relation to evolving film technology, will be released in October 2025.

In 2002, she was awarded a Guggenheim Fellowship for "a study of the decline of sentiment in American silent film." In addition to film history, she has also taught animation history at UW Madison.

== Bibliography ==
- The Wages of Sin (1991)
- Theatre to Cinema (1997)
- The Decline of Sentiment (2008)
- Film Rhythm After Sound (2015)
- John Ford at Work (2025)
