= High Tide (1947 film) =

1947 American film noir by John Reinhardt

- Theatrical release poster
- Directed by: John Reinhardt
- Screenplay by: Robert Presnell Sr.
- Based on: the story "Inside Job" by Raoul Whitfield
- Produced by: Jack Wrather
- Starring: Lee Tracy; Don Castle; Julie Bishop
- Cinematography: Henry Sharp
- Edited by: Stewart S. Frye; William H. Ziegler
- Music by: Rudy Schrager
- Production company: Wrather Productions
- Distributed by: Monogram Pictures
- Release date: September 13, 1947 (United States)
- Running time: 72 minutes
- Country: United States
- Language: English

High Tide is a 1947 American film noir directed by John Reinhardt. The film features Lee Tracy, Don Castle and Julie Bishop.

== Plot ==
The editor of a newspaper hires a former employee-turned-private-investigator to protect him during a power struggle. The private eye discovers the truth and the two men end up in a precarious situation after the editor's actions catch up with him and his plans backfire.

== Cast ==
- Lee Tracy as Hugh Fresney
- Don Castle as Tim 'T.M.' Slade
- Julie Bishop as Julie Vaughn
- Anabel Shaw as Dana Jones
- Douglas Walton as Clinton Vaughn
- Regis Toomey as Inspector O'Haffey
- Francis Ford as Pop Garrow
- Anthony Warde as Nick Dyke
- Argentina Brunetti as Mrs. Cresser
- Wilson Wood as Cleve Collins
- George Ryland as Doctor at Shooting Scene

== Film restoration ==
In 2013 the UCLA Film and Television Archive, funded by the Film Noir Foundation, restored the film. The restored print was screened April 13, 2013, at the American Cinematheque's "Noir City: Hollywood" festival.
