= Edward Cronjager filmography =

Edward Cronjager (March 21, 1904 – June 15, 1960) was an American cinematographer. His film career began in 1925, with Womanhandled, and ended in 1961 with The Devil's Partner, although he died over a year prior to the film's opening in Atlanta. Within this 35-year career, Cronjager was the director of photography on 117 feature films (listed here), as well as many short films. On every film he was the cinematographer, or a co-cinematographer.

== Filmography ==
Year	Film	Director	Actors	Other cinematographers	Production company	Notes
1925	Womanhandled	Gregory La Cava	Richard Dix		Famous Players–Lasky	
1926	Let's Get Married	Gregory La Cava	Richard Dix		Famous Players–Lasky	
1926	The Quarterback	Fred Newmeyer	Richard Dix		Famous Players–Lasky	
1926	Say It Again	Gregory La Cava	Richard Dix		Famous Players–Lasky	
1927	The Gay Defender	Gregory La Cava	Richard Dix		Famous Players–Lasky	
1927	Knockout Reilly	Malcolm St. Clair	Richard Dix		Famous Players–Lasky	
1927	Man Power	Clarence Badger	Richard Dix		Famous Players–Lasky	
1927	Paradise for Two	Gregory La Cava	Richard Dix		Famous Players–Lasky	
1927	Shanghai Bound	Luther Reed	Richard Dix		Famous Players–Lasky	
1928	Easy Come, Easy Go	Frank Tuttle	Richard Dix		Famous Players–Lasky	
1928	Just Married	Frank Strayer	James Hall; Lila Lee		Famous Players–Lasky	
1928	Moran of the Marines	Frank Strayer	Richard Dix		Famous Players–Lasky	
1928	Sporting Goods	Malcolm St. Clair	Richard Dix		Famous Players–Lasky	
1928	Warming Up	Fred Newmeyer	Richard Dix		Famous Players–Lasky	
1928	What a Night!	Edward Sutherland	Bebe Daniels		Famous Players–Lasky	
1929	Redskin	Victor Schertzinger	Richard Dix		Famous Players–Lasky	
1929	Fashions in Love	Victor Schertzinger	Adolphe Menjou		Famous Players–Lasky	
1929	Fast Company	A. Edward Sutherland	Evelyn Brent; Jack Oakie		Famous Players–Lasky	
1929	The Love Doctor	Melville Brown	Richard Dix		Famous Players–Lasky	
1929	Nothing But the Truth	Victor Schertzinger	Richard Dix		Famous Players–Lasky	
1929	The Wheel of Life	Victor Schertzinger	Richard Dix		Famous Players–Lasky	
1930	He Knew Women	Hugh Herbert; Lynn Shores	Lowell Sherman		RKO Radio Pictures	
1930	Lovin' the Ladies	Melville Brown	Richard Dix		RKO Radio Pictures	
1930	Seven Keys to Baldpate	Reginald Barker	Richard Dix		RKO Radio Pictures	
1930	Shooting Straight	George Archainbaud	Richard Dix		RKO Radio Pictures	
1931	Cimarron	Wesley Ruggles	Richard Dix; Irene Dunne		RKO Radio Pictures	7 Oscar nominations, including Cronjager for Best Cinematography
1931	The Public Defender	J. Walter Ruben	Richard Dix		RKO Radio Pictures	
1931	Secret Service	J. Walter Ruben	Richard Dix		RKO Radio Pictures	
1931	Young Donovan's Kid	George Archainbaud	Richard Dix; Jackie Cooper		RKO Radio Pictures	
1932	The Lost Squadron	George Archainbaud	Richard Dix; Mary Astor		RKO Radio Pictures	
1932	Bird of Paradise	King Vidor	Dolores del Río; Joel McCrea	Clyde DeVinna; Lucien Andriot	RKO Radio Pictures	
1932	The Conquerors	William A. Wellman	Richard Dix; Ann Harding		RKO Radio Pictures	
1932	Hell's Highway	Rowland Brown	Richard Dix		RKO Radio Pictures	
1932	Roar of the Dragon	Wesley Ruggles	Richard Dix		RKO Radio Pictures	
1932	Girl Crazy	William A. Seiter	Bert Wheeler; Robert Woolsey	J. Roy Hunt	RKO Radio Pictures	
1933	Diplomaniacs	William A. Seiter	Bert Wheeler; Robert Woolsey		RKO Radio Pictures	
1933	Ann Vickers	John Cromwell	Irene Dunne; Walter Huston	David Abel	RKO Radio Pictures	
1933	Sweepings	John Cromwell	Lionel Barrymore		RKO Radio Pictures	
1933	No Other Woman	J. Walter Ruben	Irene Dunne; Charles Bickford		RKO Radio Pictures	
1933	Professional Sweetheart	William A. Seiter	Ginger Rogers		RKO Radio Pictures	
1933	If I Were Free	Elliott Nugent	Irene Dunne		RKO Radio Pictures	
1934	Strictly Dynamite	Elliott Nugent	Jimmy Durante; Lupe Vélez		RKO Radio Pictures	
1934	Kentucky Kernels	George Stevens	Bert Wheeler; Robert Woolsey		RKO Radio Pictures	
1934	Down to Their Last Yacht	Paul Sloane	Mary Boland		RKO Radio Pictures	
1934	Spitfire	John Cromwell	Katharine Hepburn; Robert Young		RKO Radio Pictures	
1935	Jalna	John Cromwell	Kay Johnson; David Manners; C. Aubrey Smith		RKO Radio Pictures	
1935	The Nitwits	George Stevens	Bert Wheeler; Robert Woolsey		RKO Radio Pictures	
1935	Enchanted April	Harry Beaumont	Ann Harding		RKO Radio Pictures	
1935	In Person	William A. Seiter	Ginger Rogers		RKO Radio Pictures	
1935	Roberta	William A. Seiter	Irene Dunne; Fred Astaire; Ginger Rogers		RKO Radio Pictures	
1936	Yellow Dust	Wallace Fox	Richard Dix		RKO Radio Pictures	
1936	The Texas Rangers	King Vidor	Fred MacMurray; Jack Oakie		Paramount Pictures	
1936	Special Investigator	Louis King	Richard Dix		RKO Radio Pictures	
1936	Three Married Men	Edward Buzzell	Roscoe Karns; William Frawley; Lynne Overman		Paramount Pictures	
1937	One in a Million	Sidney Lanfield	Sonja Henie; Adolphe Menjou		Twentieth Century-Fox	Sonja Henie's film debut
1937	Thin Ice	Sidney Lanfield	Sonja Henie; Tyrone Power		Twentieth Century-Fox	
1937	Wife, Doctor and Nurse	Walter Lang	Loretta Young; Warner Baxter; Virginia Bruce		Twentieth Century-Fox	
1937	Wake Up and Live	Sidney Lanfield	Walter Winchell; Ben Bernie; Alice Faye		Twentieth Century-Fox	
1938	Gateway	Alfred Werker	Don Ameche; Arleen Whelan		Twentieth Century-Fox	
1938	Rascals	H. Bruce Humberstone	Jane Withers		Twentieth Century-Fox	
1938	Island in the Sky	Herbert I. Leeds	Gloria Stuart; Michael Whalen		Twentieth Century-Fox	
1938	Keep Smiling	Herbert I. Leeds	Jane Withers		Twentieth Century-Fox	
1939	The Escape	Richard Cortez	Kane Richmond; Amanda Duff; June Gale		Twentieth Century-Fox	
1939	Winner Take All	Otto Brower	Tony Martin; Gloria Stuart		Twentieth Century-Fox	
1939	Heaven with a Barbed Wire Fence	Ricardo Cortez	Jean Rogers; Raymond Walburn; Marjorie Rambeau; Glenn Ford; Nicholas Conte		Twentieth Century-Fox	
1939	The Gorilla	Allan Dwan	Jimmy Ritz; Harry Ritz; Al Ritz		Twentieth Century-Fox	
1939	While New York Sleeps	H. Bruce Humberstone	Michael Whalen; Jean Rogers; Chick Chandler	Lucien Andriot	Twentieth Century-Fox	
1939	Chicken Wagon Family	Herbert I. Leeds	Jane Withers		Twentieth Century-Fox	
1939	Everything Happens at Night	Irving Cummings	Sonja Henie		Twentieth Century-Fox	
1939	Too Busy to Work	Otto Brower	Jed Prouty		Twentieth Century-Fox	
1940	The Gay Caballero	Otto Brower	Cesar Romero		Twentieth Century-Fox	
1940	I Was an Adventuress	Gregory Ratoff	Zorina	Leon Shamroy	Twentieth Century-Fox	
1940	Youth Will Be Served	Otto Brower	Jane Withers		Twentieth Century-Fox	
1940	Girl in 313	Richard Cortez	Florence Rice; Kent Taylor; Lionel Atwill; Katharine Aldridge		Twentieth Century-Fox	
1940	City of Chance	Ricardo Cortez	Lynn Bari; C. Aubrey Smith; Donald Woods; Amanda Duff	Lucien Andriot	Twentieth Century-Fox	
1940	Young People	Allan Dwan	Shirley Temple; Jack Oakie; Charlotte Greenwood	Arthur Miller	Twentieth Century-Fox	
1941	I Wake Up Screaming	H. Bruce Humberstone	Betty Grable; Victor Mature; Carole Landis		Twentieth Century-Fox	
1941	Rise and Shine	Allan Dwan	Jack Oakie; George Murphy; Linda Darnell; Walter Brennan; Milton Berle		Twentieth Century-Fox	
1941	A Very Young Lady	Harold Schuster	Jane Withers		Twentieth Century-Fox	
1941	Sun Valley Serenade	H. Bruce Humberstone	Sonja Henie; John Payne		Twentieth Century-Fox	Nominated for three Oscars, including Best Black and White Cinematography
1941	Western Union	Fritz Lang	Robert Young; Randolph Scott; Dean Jagger; Virginia Gilmore		Twentieth Century-Fox	
1942	Friendly Enemies	Allan Dwan	Charles Winninger; Charlie Ruggles		Edward Small Productions	
1942	Girl Trouble	Harold Schuster	Don Ameche; Joan Bennett		Twentieth Century-Fox	
1942	Life Begins at Eight-Thirty	Irving Pichel	Monty Woolley; Ida Lupino		Twentieth Century-Fox	
1942	The Pied Piper	Irving Pichel	Monty Woolley		Twentieth Century-Fox	Nominated for Oscar for Best Black and White Cinematography
1942	To the Shores of Tripoli	Bruce Humberstone	John Payne; Maureen O'Hara; Randolph Scott	William Skall; Harry Jackson	Twentieth Century-Fox	Nominated for Oscar for Best Color Cinematography
1943	The Gang's All Here	Busby Berkeley	Alice Faye; Carmen Miranda; Phil Baker; Benny Goodman		Twentieth Century-Fox	
1943	Heaven Can Wait	Ernst Lubitsch	Gene Tierney; Don Ameche		Twentieth Century-Fox	Nominated for Oscar for Best Color Cinematography
1943	Margin for Error	Otto Preminger	Joan Bennett; Milton Berle; Otto Preminger		Twentieth Century-Fox	
1943	My Friend Flicka	Harold Schuster	Roddy McDowall; Preston Foster; Rita Johnson	Dewey Wrigley; Virgil Miller	Twentieth Century-Fox	
1944	Irish Eyes Are Smiling	Gregory Ratoff	Monty Woolley; June Haver; Dick Haymes	Harry Jackson	Twentieth Century-Fox	
1944	Home in Indiana	Henry Hathaway	Walter Brennan; Lon McCallister; Jeanne Crain; Charlotte Greenwood; June Haver		Twentieth Century-Fox	Nominated for Oscar for Best Color Cinematography
1945	Nob Hill	Henry Hathaway	George Raft; Joan Bennett; Vivian Blaine; Peggy Ann Garner		Twentieth Century-Fox	
1945	Paris-Underground	Gregory Ratoff	Constance Bennett; Gracie Fields	Lee Garmes	Constance Bennett Productions	
1946	Colonel Effingham's Raid	Irving Pichel	Charles Coburn; Joan Bennett; William Eythe		Twentieth Century-Fox	
1946	Canyon Passage	Jacques Tourneur	Dana Andrews; Brian Donlevy; Susan Hayward		Universal Pictures Company	
1946	Do You Love Me	Gregory Ratoff	Maureen O'Hara; Dick Haymes; Harry James		Twentieth Century-Fox	
1947	Desert Fury	Lewis Allen	John Hodiak; Lizabeth Scott; Burt Lancaster	Charles Lang	Hal Wallis Productions	
1947	Honeymoon	William Keighley	Shirley Temple; Franchot Tone; Guy Madison		RKO Radio Pictures	
1948	The Countess of Monte Cristo	Frederick De Cordova; Andrew Stone	Sonja Henie	Tony Gaudio	Westwood Corporation	
1948	An Innocent Affair	Lloyd Bacon	Fred MacMurray; Madeleine Carroll		James Nasser Productions	
1948	Relentless	George Sherman	Robert Young		Cavalier Productions	
1950	The Capture	John Sturges	Lew Ayres; Teresa Wright		Showtime Properties	
1950	House by the River	Fritz Lang	Louis Hayward; Jane Wyatt; Lee Bowman		Fidelity Pictures	
1951	Best of the Badmen	William D. Russell	Robert Ryan; Claire Trevor; Jack Buetel; Robert Preston		RKO Radio Pictures	
1951	I'd Climb the Highest Mountain	Henry King	Susan Hayward; William Lundigan		Twentieth Century-Fox	
1951	Two Tickets to Broadway	James V. Kern	Tony Martin; Janet Leigh; Gloria DeHaven; Eddie Bracken; Ann Miller	Harry Wild	RKO Radio Pictures	
1952	Lure of the Wilderness	Jean Negulesco	Jean Peters; Jeffrey Hunter; Constance Smith		Twentieth Century-Fox	
1952	Bloodhounds of Broadway	Harmon Jones	Mitzi Gaynor; Scott Brady		Twentieth Century-Fox	
1953	Powder River	Louis King	Rory Calhoun; Corinne Calvet; Cameron Mitchell		Twentieth Century-Fox	
1953	Treasure of the Golden Condor	Delmer Daves	Cornel Wilde; Constance Smith		Twentieth Century-Fox	
1953	Beneath the 12-Mile Reef	Robert D. Webb	Robert Wagner; Terry Moore; Gilbert Roland		Twentieth Century-Fox	Nominated for Oscar for Best Cinematography
1954	Désirée	Henry Koster	Marlon Brando; Jean Simmons; Merle Oberon; Michael Rennie	Milton Krasner	Twentieth Century-Fox	
1954	Siege at Red River	Rudolph Maté	Van Johnson; Joanne Dru		Panoramic Productions	
1960	The Girl in Lovers Lane	Charles R. Rondeau	Brett Halsey; Joyce Meadows; Lowell Brown; Jack Elam		Brigadier Pictures	
1960	The Threat	Charles R. Rondeau	Robert Knapp		Robin Rae Productions	
1961	The Devil's Partner	Charles R. Rondeau	Ed Nelson; Jean Allison		Huron Productions	
