= Charles D. Brown =

American actor (1887–1948)

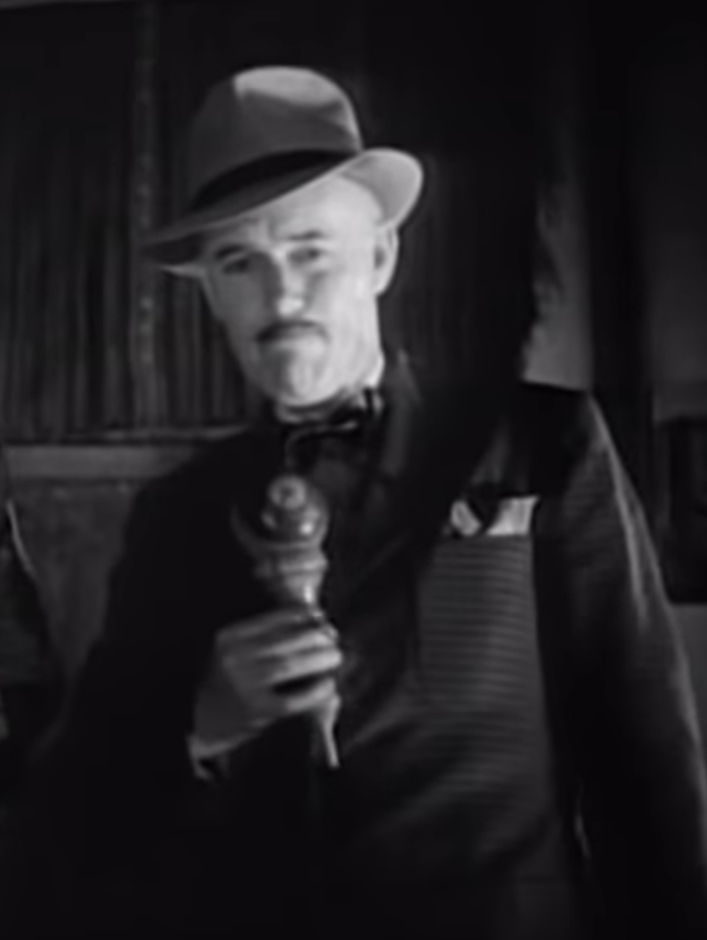
- Brown in Algiers (1947)
- Born: July 1, 1887; Council Bluffs, Iowa, U.S.
- Died: November 25, 1948 (aged 61); Hollywood, California, U.S.
- Resting place: Valhalla Memorial Park Cemetery
- Occupation: Actor
- Years active: 1911–1948
- Spouse: Nellie V. Tallman (m. 1912)

Charles D. Brown (July 1, 1887 – November 25, 1948) was an American stage and film actor.

Born in Council Bluffs, Iowa, Brown wrote and directed a single short film in 1914. As an actor, he appeared in more than 100 films, stretching from 1921 through his death in 1948. His parallel career on the Broadway stage spanned 1911 through 1937.

Brown died at the age of 61 in Hollywood, California on November 25, 1948. He is buried in Valhalla Memorial Park Cemetery in North Hollywood.

== Partial filmography ==
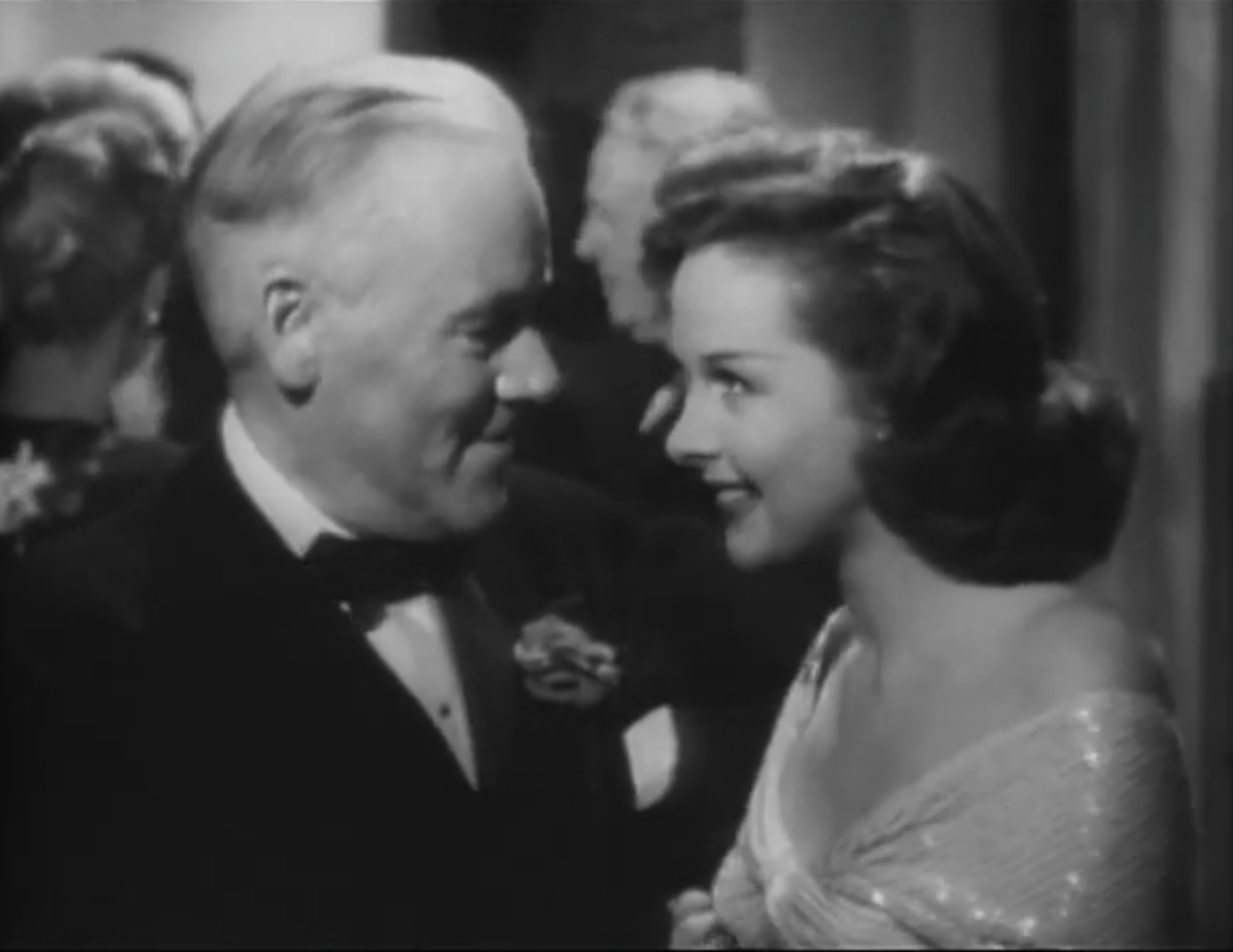
Charles D. Brown with Susan Hayward in Smash-Up, the Story of a Woman (1947)

- A Man of Stone (1921) - Lord Reggie
- The Way of a Maid (1921) - Gordon Witherspoon
- Dangerous Curves (1929) - Spider
- The Dance of Life (1929) - Lefty Miller
- Murder by the Clock (1931) - Officer O'Brien (uncredited)
- The Secret Call (1931) - Bob Barnes
- The Road to Reno (1931) - Jim - Bartender at Pussy-Willow Cafe (uncredited)
- 24 Hours (1931) - Detective (uncredited)
- Touchdown (1931) - Harrigan
- The False Madonna (1931) - Peter Angel
- Gold Diggers of 1937 (1936) - Hugo
- Thoroughbreds Don't Cry (1937) - 'Click' Donovan
- Algiers (1938) - Max
- Mr. Moto's Gamble (1938) - Editor
- Island in the Sky (1938) - Inspector Whitehead
- Speed to Burn (1938) - Pop Williams
- The Shopworn Angel (1938) - McGonigle
- Barefoot Boy (1938) - Calvin Whittaker
- The Crowd Roars (1938) - Bill Thorne
- Time Out for Murder (1938) - Max - City Editor (uncredited)
- Flight to Fame (1938) - Maj. Loy
- Five of a Kind (1938) - Editor Crane
- Exposed (1938) - Steve Conway
- Up the River (1938) - Warden Harris
- The Duke of West Point (1938) - Doc Porter
- Disbarred (1939) - Jackson
- Inside Story (1939) - J.B. Douglas
- The Ice Follies of 1939 (1939) - Barney
- Mr. Moto in Danger Island (1939) - Col. Thomas Castle
- Tell No Tales (1939) - Police Lt. Brandt (uncredited)
- Charlie Chan in Reno (1939) - Chief of Police King
- Babes in Arms (1939) - Larry Randall (uncredited)
- Smashing the Money Ring (1939) - Parker
- Little Accident (1939) - Jeff Collins
- Kid Nightingale (1939) - Charles Paxton
- City of Chance (1940) - District Attorney (uncredited)
- He Married His Wife (1940) - Detective
- Wolf of New York (1940) - Const. Nolan
- The Grapes of Wrath (1940) - Wilkie
- I Take This Woman (1940) - Police Lieutenant (uncredited)
- Johnny Apollo (1940) - Sergeant Putting Pinch on Mickey and Johnny (uncredited)
- Forgotten Girls (1940) - Editor Linton
- Florian (1940) - New York Police Lt. (uncredited)
- Women in War (1940) - Freddie (uncredited)
- Brother Orchid (1940) - Brother Wren
- Sailor's Lady (1940) - Capt. Roscoe
- Pier 13 (1940) - Police Captain Blake
- Boom Town (1940) - U.S. Marshal Stebbins (uncredited)
- The Leather Pushers (1940) - J.R. Stevens
- The Old Swimmin' Hole (1940) - Doc Elliott
- Santa Fe Trail (1940) - Maj. Sumner
- Maisie Was a Lady (1941) - 'Doctor' in Sideshow (uncredited)
- Tall, Dark and Handsome (1941) - District Attorney
- Ride, Kelly, Ride (1941) - Bob Martin
- Reaching for the Sun (1941) - Johnson
- International Lady (1941) - Tetlow
- The Devil Pays Off (1941) - Capt. Jonathan Hunt
- Glamour Boy (1942) - Martin Carmichael
- Right to the Heart (1942) - Jim Killian
- Roxie Hart (1942) - Charles E. Murdock
- Fingers at the Window (1942) - Inspector Gallagher
- Sweater Girl (1942) - Police Lt. McGill
- Bombardier (1943) - Officer at Briefing (uncredited)
- Destroyer (1943) - Doctor (uncredited)
- A Lady Takes a Chance (1943) - Dr. G.W. Humboldt
- Swing Shift Maisie (1943) - Curtis Glenby (uncredited)
- The Iron Major (1943) - Fordham Official (uncredited)
- Minesweeper (1943) - Cmdr. Lane
- Lost Angel (1943) - Ed Vincent, NY Morning Transcript City Editor (uncredited)
- The Racket Man (1944) - Clark (uncredited)
- The Fighting Seabees (1944) - Capt. Squires (uncredited)
- Up in Arms (1944) - Mr. Campbell
- Jam Session (1944) - Raymond Stuart
- Follow the Boys (1944) - Col. Starret (uncredited)
- Ladies of Washington (1944) - Inspector Saunders (uncredited)
- Secret Command (1944) - James Thane
- Here Come the Waves (1944) - Capt. Johnson (uncredited)
- Having Wonderful Crime (1945) - Mr. Winslow
- Eve Knew Her Apples (1945) - Joe Gordon
- Don Juan Quilligan (1945) - Police Inspector (uncredited)
- Apology for Murder (1945) - Ward McKee
- Sunbonnet Sue (1945) - Father Hurley
- Sing Your Way Home (1945) - Charles 'Woody' Woodrow (uncredited)
- Tomorrow Is Forever (1946) - Immigration Officer (uncredited)
- Just Before Dawn (1946) - Insp. Burns
- Night Editor (1946) - Crane Stewart
- The Hoodlum Saint (1946) - Ed Collner - Chronicle Reporter
- The Bride Wore Boots (1946) - Wells (uncredited)
- The Man Who Dared (1946) - Dist. Atty. Darrell Tyson
- The Strange Love of Martha Ivers (1946) - McCarthy
- In Fast Company (1946) - Father Donovan
- The Searching Wind (1946) - Carter
- Danger Woman (1946) - Inspector Pepper
- The Last Crooked Mile (1946) - Dietrich - Bank President
- Notorious (1946) - Judge (uncredited)
- The Big Sleep (1946) - Norris - the Butler
- The Killers (1946) - Packy Robinson - Ole's Manager
- Wake Up and Dream (1946) - Lieutenant Commander
- Swell Guy (1946) - McHugh (uncredited)
- Smash-Up, the Story of a Woman (1947) - Michael 'Mike' Dawson
- Undercover Maisie (1947) - Captain Mead
- Railroaded! (1947) - Police Capt. MacTaggart
- Merton of the Movies (1947) - Jeff Baird
- The Senator Was Indiscreet (1947) - Dinty
- I Walk Alone (1947) - Police Lt. Hollaran (uncredited)
- On Our Merry Way (1948) - Mr. Sadd
- Let's Live Again (1948) - Psychiatrist
- I Wouldn't Be in Your Shoes (1948) - Inspector Stevens
- In This Corner (1948) - Victor 'Doc' Fuller
- Tulsa (1949) - Judge McKay (uncredited)
- Follow Me Quietly (1949) - Police Insp. Mulvaney (final film role)
