= Inside Story (film) =

- Directed by: Ricardo Cortez
- Screenplay by: Jerome Cady
- Produced by: Howard J. Green
- Starring: Michael Whalen; Jean Rogers; Chick Chandler; Douglas Fowley; John 'Dusty' King; Jane Darwell
- Cinematography: Virgil Miller
- Edited by: Norman Colbert; Jack Murray
- Music by: Cyril J. Mockridge
- Production company: 20th Century Fox
- Distributed by: 20th Century Fox
- Release date: March 10, 1939
- Running time: 60 minutes
- Country: United States
- Language: English

Inside Story is a 1939 American drama film directed by Ricardo Cortez and written by Jerome Cady. The film stars Michael Whalen, Jean Rogers, Chick Chandler, Douglas Fowley, John 'Dusty' King and Jane Darwell. The film was released on March 10, 1939, by 20th Century Fox.

== Cast ==
- Michael Whalen as Barney Callahan
- Jean Rogers as June White
- Chick Chandler as Snapper Doolan
- Douglas Fowley as Gus Brawley
- John 'Dusty' King as Paul Randall
- Jane Darwell as Aunt Mary Perkins
- June Gale as Eunice
- Spencer Charters as Uncle Ben Perkins
- Theodore von Eltz as Whitey
- Cliff Clark as Collins
- Charles D. Brown as J.B. Douglas
- Charles Lane as District Attorney
- Jan Duggan as Flora
- Louise Carter as Dora
- Bert Roach as Hopkins
