= Cliff Clark =

American actor (1889–1953)

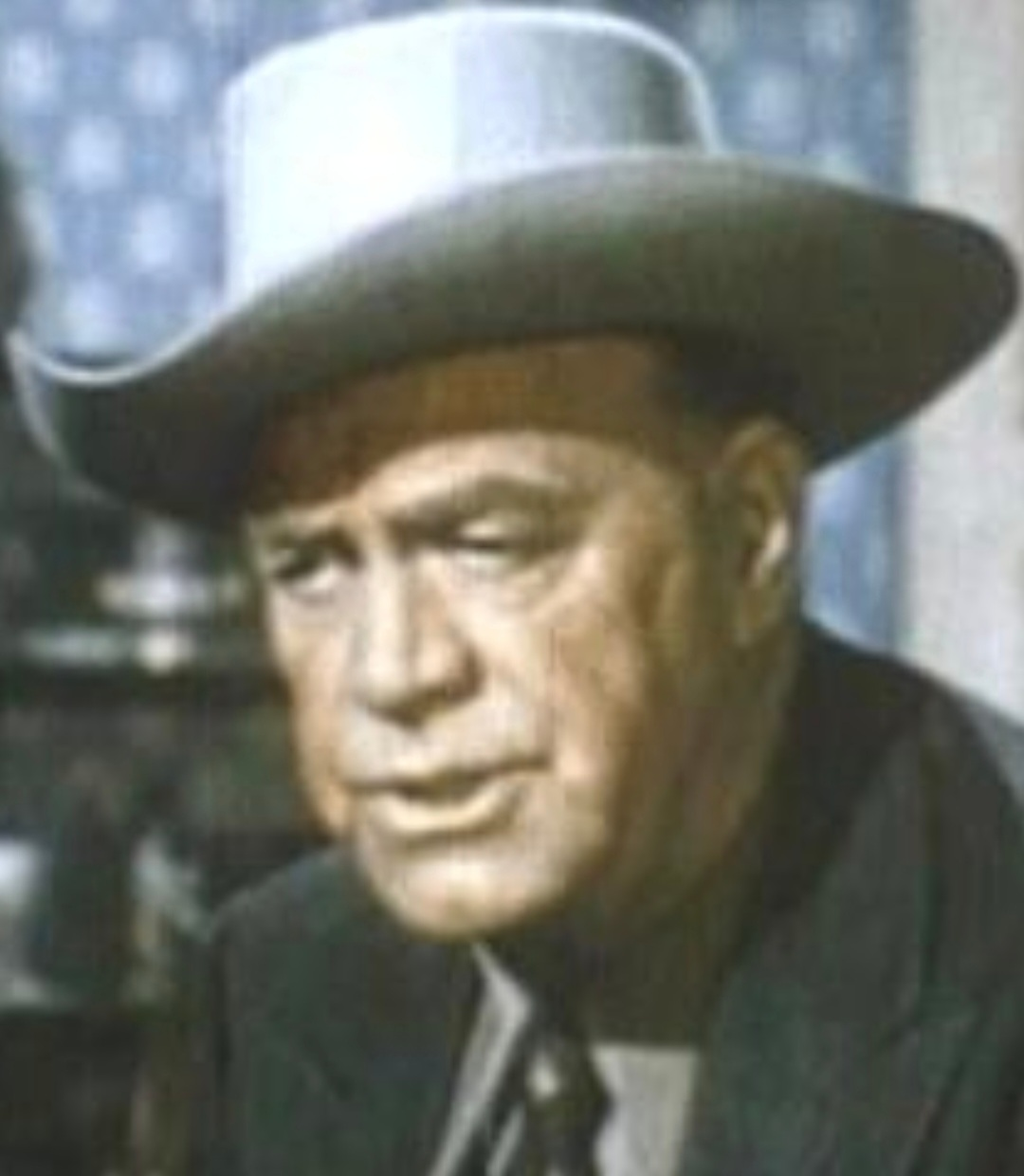
- Clark in Adventures of Gallant Bess (1948)
- Born: June 10, 1889; New York City, U.S.
- Died: February 8, 1953 (aged 63); Hollywood, California, U.S.
- Occupation: Actor
- Years active: 1933–1956
- Spouse: Stella Delauries

Cliff Clark (June 10, 1889 – February 8, 1953) was an American actor. He entered the film business in 1937 after a substantial stage career and appeared in over 200 Hollywood films. In the last years of his life, he also played in a number of television productions.

Clark mostly played minor supporting roles. A specialty of his were policemen, inspectors and sheriffs. He appeared in a recurring role as Inspector Donovan in the Falcon film series at RKO Pictures during the 1940s.

== Selected filmography ==
- Big Time or Bust (1933) - Carnival Barker (uncredited)
- Mountain Music (1937) - Pretty Panther Medicine Show Proprietor
- The Patient in Room 18 (1938) - Inspector Foley
- Daredevil Drivers (1938) - Mr. McAullife
- He Couldn't Say No (1938) - Auctioneer
- Mr. Moto's Gamble (1938) - McGuire
- Cocoanut Grove (1938) - Auctioneer (uncredited)
- Speed to Burn (1938) - Auctioneer (uncredited)
- The Crowd Roars (1938) - George James (uncredited)
- Time Out for Murder (1938) - Det. Capt. Collins
- Up the River (1938) - Warden Fowler (uncredited)
- While New York Sleeps (1938) - Police Insp. Cliff Collins
- Kentucky (1938) - Melish
- They Made Me a Criminal (1939) - Manager
- Honolulu (1939) - 1st Detective
- Inside Story (1939) - Collins
- Within the Law (1939) - McGuire
- Calling Dr. Kildare (1939) - Detective Flaherty (uncredited)
- It's a Wonderful World (1939) - Captain Haggerty
- Young Mr. Lincoln (1939) - Sheriff Gil Billings (uncredited)
- Miracles for Sale (1939) - Inspector Gavigan
- Chicken Wagon Family (1939) - Horse Auctioneer (uncredited)
- Torchy Blane... Playing with Dynamite (1939) - Mike Kelly
- Dust Be My Destiny (1939) - First Detective (uncredited)
- Fast and Furious (1939) - Sam Travers
- Call a Messenger (1939) - Sgt. Harrison (uncredited)
- Missing Evidence (1939) - Allen Jennings
- Joe and Ethel Turp Call on the President (1939) - Garage Owner
- Henry Goes Arizona (1939) - Theatrical Agent V. B. Carmady (uncredited)
- Slightly Honorable (1939) - Capt. Graves
- Judge Hardy and Son (1939) - Officer Dan O'Shea (uncredited)
- Invisible Stripes (1939) - Police Sergeant (uncredited)
- The Man Who Wouldn't Talk (1940) - Ryan (uncredited)
- Brother Rat and a Baby (1940) - Police Captain (uncredited)
- The Grapes of Wrath (1940) - City Man
- Dr. Ehrlich's Magic Bullet (1940) - Haupt (uncredited)
- Honeymoon Deferred (1940) - Police Insp. Mathews
- Castle on the Hudson (1940) - Prison Guard Sergeant (uncredited)
- Double Alibi (1940) - Police Inspector Early
- Three Cheers for the Irish (1940) - Mara
- Women Without Names (1940) - Pete (uncredited)
- Charlie Chan's Murder Cruise (1940) - Lt. Wilson (uncredited)
- Gangs of Chicago (1940) - Detective (uncredited)
- Murder in the Air (1940) - Police Chief at Morgue (uncredited)
- Florian (1940) - Detective Joe (uncredited)
- A Fugitive from Justice (1940) - Police Captain (uncredited)
- You're Not So Tough (1940) - Sheriff Griswold (uncredited)
- Cross-Country Romance (1940) - Police Capt. G.G. Burke
- Maryland (1940) - Sheriff (uncredited)
- Black Diamonds (1940) - Archie Connor
- Stranger on the Third Floor (1940) - Martin
- Brigham Young (1940) - Dissenter (uncredited)
- Flowing Gold (1940) - Oil Well Shares Seller (uncredited)
- Wagon Train (1940) - Matt Gardner
- Knute Rockne All American (1940) - Danny - Post Office Paymaster (uncredited)
- A Dispatch from Reuters (1940) - Reporter (uncredited)
- Santa Fe Trail (1940) - Instructor (scenes deleted)
- Western Union (1941) - Sheriff (uncredited)
- Golden Hoofs (1941) - Booth
- The Trial of Mary Dugan (1941) - John Dugan (uncredited)
- The Sea Wolf (1941) - First Detective (uncredited)
- Washington Melodrama (1941) - Simpson
- Strange Alibi (1941) - Captain Reddick
- The Wagons Roll at Night (1941) - Doc
- Thieves Fall Out (1941) - Policeman (uncredited)
- For Beauty's Sake (1941) - Police Lt. Doleman (uncredited)
- Blondie in Society (1941) - Chief of Police (uncredited)
- Manpower (1941) - Cully
- Nine Lives Are Not Enough (1941) - Lieutenant Buckley
- Honky Tonk (1941) - Dr. Otis (uncredited)
- Mob Town (1941) - Captain Harrington - Police Chief (uncredited)
- Law of the Tropics (1941) - Bartender
- Dangerously They Live (1941) - John Dill
- Babes on Broadway (1941) - Inspector Moriarity
- Blue, White and Perfect (1942) - Inspector Peterson
- A Yank on the Burma Road (1942) - Police Lieutenant (uncredited)
- Wild Bill Hickok Rides (1942) - Vic Kersey
- Jail House Blues (1942) - Warden Boswell
- Joe Smith, American (1942) - Police Captain (uncredited)
- Butch Minds the Baby (1942) - Police Captain (uncredited)
- True to the Army (1942) - Circus Barker (uncredited)
- Kid Glove Killer (1942) - Captain Lynch
- Who Is Hope Schuyler? (1942) - Lt. Palmer
- Fingers at the Window (1942) - Lt. Allison
- Mokey (1942) - Mr. Graham
- The Big Shot (1942) - Police Captain (uncredited)
- Secret Enemies (1942) - Detective Capt. Jarrett
- Henry Aldrich, Editor (1942) - Fire Chief
- The Falcon's Brother (1942) - Inspector Timothy Donovan
- Highways by Night (1942) - Police Captain James
- Street of Chance (1942) - Ryan, (Policeman)
- The Mummy's Tomb (1942) - Sheriff
- Army Surgeon (1942) - Ship Captain (uncredited)
- Madame Spy (1942) - Inspector Varden
- USS VD: Ship of Shame (1942) - Margaret's Doctor (uncredited)
- Tennessee Johnson (1942) - Delegate with Badge (uncredited)
- Something to Shout About (1943) - Harrigan - Desk Sergeant (uncredited)
- Ladies' Day (1942) - Dan Hannigan, Sox Manager
- Keep 'Em Slugging (1943) - Macklin (uncredited)
- Slightly Dangerous (1943) - Detective (uncredited)
- The Falcon Strikes Back (1943) - Inspector Timothy Donovan
- Taxi, Mister (1943) - Police Chief Jim (uncredited)
- The Falcon in Danger (1943) - Inspector Timothy Donovan
- Petticoat Larceny (1943) - Lieutenant Hackett
- Destroyer (1943) - Commandant (uncredited)
- The Falcon and the Co-eds (1943) - Inspector Timothy Donovan
- There's Something About a Soldier (1943) - City Editor (uncredited)
- Destination Tokyo (1943) - Hornet's Admiral (uncredited)
- The Falcon Out West (1944) - Inspector Timothy Donovan
- Andy Hardy's Blonde Trouble (1944) - Officer Shay (uncredited)
- Once Upon a Time (1944) - Radio Car Cop (uncredited)
- Song of the Open Road (1944) - Mr. Evans (uncredited)
- Marine Raiders (1944) - Maj. Gen. Rider, Guadalcanal Marine Commander (uncredited)
- Bride by Mistake (1944) - Navy Captain (uncredited)
- Maisie Goes to Reno (1944) - Police Captain (uncredited)
- In the Meantime, Darling (1944) - Col. Corkery
- Barbary Coast Gent (1944) - Jack Coda
- The Missing Juror (1944) - Inspector Davis (uncredited)
- Nothing but Trouble (1944) - Police Sergeant (uncredited)
- Escape in the Desert (1945) - Charlie, Gas Truck Driver (uncredited)
- The Thirteenth Hour (1947) - Police Captain Linfield
- Mr. District Attorney (1947) - Police Captain Lambert (uncredited)
- Lost Honeymoon (1947) - Police Sergeant (uncredited)
- Buck Privates Come Home (1947) - Quentin (INS) (uncredited)
- Philo Vance's Gamble (1947) - Inspector Walsh
- The Corpse Came C.O.D. (1947) - City Editor Emmett Willard (uncredited)
- Bury Me Dead (1947) - Archer, Detective
- Cass Timberlane (1947) - Humbert Bellile (uncredited)
- Roses Are Red (1947) - Police Capt. Sharkey (uncredited)
- Her Husband's Affairs (1947) - Gus (uncredited)
- It Had to Be You (1947) - Fire Chief (uncredited)
- Albuquerque (1948) - Armin's Clerk (uncredited)
- Alias a Gentleman (1948) - The Warden (uncredited)
- Mr. Blandings Builds His Dream House (1948) - Jones (uncredited)
- Fort Apache (1948) - Stage Driver (uncredited)
- Smart Woman (1948) - Police Captain (uncredited)
- The Fuller Brush Man (1948) - Cop in Park (uncredited)
- Raw Deal (1948) - Gates
- I, Jane Doe (1948) - City Editor (uncredited)
- The Big Punch (1948) - Bartender George (uncredited)
- Borrowed Trouble (1948) - Dink Davis
- Deep Waters (1948) - Harris
- The Babe Ruth Story (1948) - St. Louis Manager (uncredited)
- Embraceable You (1948) - Honest Peterson (uncredited)
- A Southern Yankee (1948) - Confederate Doctor (uncredited)
- Hollow Triumph (1948) - Motorist (uncredited)
- Sorry, Wrong Number (1948) - Police Sergeant Duffy (uncredited)
- Good Sam (1948) - Probation Officer (scenes deleted)
- False Paradise (1948) - Banker Waite
- In This Corner (1948) - CPO Mike Burke
- The Snake Pit (1948) - Shooting Gallery Proprietor (uncredited)
- Trouble Makers (1948) - Police Captain Madison
- Jiggs and Maggie in Court (1948) - Judge Wilson
- Adventures of Gallant Bess (1948) - Sheriff
- Force of Evil (1948) - Police Lieutenant (uncredited)
- Shockproof (1949) - Mac - Police Lieutenant (uncredited)
- The Crime Doctor's Diary (1949) - Police Insp. John D. Manning (uncredited)
- Homicide (1949) - Capt. Mooney
- The Stratton Story (1949) - Josh Higgins
- Home of the Brave (1949) - Colonel Baker
- Any Number Can Play (1949) - Gas Station Attendant (uncredited)
- Mighty Joe Young (1949) - McManus - Police Guard Moran (uncredited)
- Flaming Fury (1949) - Fire Engineer Robby Rollins
- Post Office Investigator (1949) - Inspector Delany
- Miss Grant Takes Richmond (1949) - Construction Materials Contractor (uncredited)
- Roseanna McCoy (1949) - Sideshow Barker (uncredited)
- Fighting Man of the Plains (1949) - Travers
- Powder River Rustlers (1949) - Lucius Statton
- Ambush (1950) - Capt. Harcourt (uncredited)
- The Secret Fury (1950) - Police Capt. Arnold (uncredited)
- Blondie's Hero (1950) - Police Officer (uncredited)
- The Gunfighter (1950) - Jerry Marlowe (uncredited)
- The Big Hangover (1950) - Albert Johnson (uncredited)
- The Second Woman (1950) - Police Sergeant
- The Men (1950) - Dr. Kameran
- The Cariboo Trail (1950) - Assayer
- Desperadoes of the West (1950, Serial) - Colonel Arnold
- Vigilante Hideout (1950) - Howard Sanders
- Rookie Fireman (1950) - Captain Mack Connors
- The Fuller Brush Girl (1950) - Ship Captain (uncredited)
- The Sun Sets at Dawn (1950) - Executioner (uncredited)
- Southside 1-1000 (1950) - Deane's Guard on Train (uncredited)
- The Sound of Fury (1950) - Sheriff Demig
- Operation Pacific (1951) - Commander, SUBPAC
- Sugarfoot (1951) - Rancher (uncredited)
- The Great Missouri Raid (1951) - Railroad Engineer (uncredited)
- Mr. Imperium (1951) - Restaurant Proprietor (uncredited)
- Saddle Legion (1951) - Fred Warren
- My Forbidden Past (1951) - Horse Vendor (uncredited)
- Cavalry Scout (1951) - Colonel George Deering
- Warpath (1951) - Bartender
- Joe Palooka in Triple Cross (1951) - Sheriff Malin
- Desert of Lost Men (1951) - Carl Landers
- Silver City (1951) - Bartender (uncredited)
- Overland Telegraph (1951) - Terence Muldoon
- Scandal Sheet (1952) - Doc O'Hanlon (uncredited)
- Phone Call from a Stranger (1952) - Watchman (uncredited)
- High Noon (1952) - Ed Weaver (uncredited)
- The Pride of St. Louis (1952) - Pittsburgh Coach (uncredited)
- The Sniper (1952) - Chief of Police (uncredited)
- The Sellout (1952) - Andy - Police Chief (uncredited)
- Cripple Creek (1952) - Winfield Hatton (uncredited)
- Carrie (1952) - Policeman (uncredited)
- Francis Goes to West Point (1952) - Officer Baker (uncredited)
- The Big Sky (1952) - Jailer (uncredited)
- It Grows on Trees (1952) - Police Desk Sergeant Reilly (uncredited)
- My Man and I (1952) - Bit Role (uncredited)
- Hurricane Smith (1952) - Australian Policeman (uncredited)
- Toughest Man in Arizona (1952) - Nathan Barlack (uncredited)
- Sky Full of Moon (1952) - Agent at Train Stop (uncredited)
- The War of the Worlds (1953) - Australian Policeman (scenes deleted)
- South Sea Woman (1953) - Lt. Col. Parker (uncredited)
- Houdini (1953) - Barker (uncredited)
- Here Come the Girls (1953) - Hackenschmidt - Cabbie (uncredited)
