= Island in the Sky (1938 film) =

1938 film by Herbert I. Leeds

- Theatrical release poster
- Directed by: Herbert I. Leeds
- Written by: Jerome Cady; Maurice Rapf
- Screenplay by: Frances Hyland; Albert Ray
- Based on: Island in the Sky; 1936 McCall's story by Leonard Lee
- Produced by: Sol M. Wurtzel
- Starring: Gloria Stuart; Michael Whalen
- Cinematography: Edward Cronjager
- Edited by: Harry Reynolds
- Music by: Harry Akst
- Distributed by: Twentieth Century-Fox Film Corporation
- Release date: April 1, 1938
- Running time: 68 minutes
- Country: United States
- Language: English

Island in the Sky is a 1938 drama directed by Herbert I. Leeds, starring Gloria Stuart and Michael Whalen.

== Plot ==
Julie Hayes (Gloria Stuart) is betrothed to Michael Fraser (Michael Whalen), assistant district attorney. Peter Vincent (Robert Kellard) is falsely convicted of the murder of his father Stephen Vincent and is condemned to death, Julie postpones her wedding to prove him innocent. She enlists the help of Johnny Doyle (Paul Kelly), a former gangster, and eventually succeeds in saving the innocent man's life.

== Cast ==
- Gloria Stuart as Julie Hayes
- Michael Whalen as Michael Fraser
- Paul Kelly as Johnny Doyle
- Robert Kellard as Peter Vincent
- June Storey as Lucy Rhodes
- Paul Hurst as Happy
- Leon Ames as Marty Butler
- Willard Robertson as Walter Rhodes
- George Humbert as Peter Trompas
- Aggie Herring as Mrs. Maggie O'Shea
- Charles D. Brown as Inspector Whitehead
