= Time Out for Murder =

1938 film by H. Bruce Humberstone

- Theatrical release poster
- Directed by: H. Bruce Humberstone
- Screenplay by: Jerome Cady
- Story by: Irving Reis
- Produced by: Sol M. Wurtzel
- Starring: Gloria Stuart; Michael Whalen; Chick Chandler; Douglas Fowley; Robert Kellard; Jane Darwell; Jean Rogers
- Cinematography: Virgil Miller
- Edited by: Jack Murray
- Production company: 20th Century Fox
- Distributed by: 20th Century Fox
- Release date: September 25, 1938
- Running time: 61 minutes
- Country: United States
- Language: English

Time Out for Murder is a 1938 American crime film directed by H. Bruce Humberstone, written by Jerome Cady, and starring Gloria Stuart, Michael Whalen, Chick Chandler, Douglas Fowley, Robert Kellard, Jane Darwell and Jean Rogers. It was released on September 25, 1938, by 20th Century Fox.

== Cast ==
- Gloria Stuart as Margie Ross
- Michael Whalen as Barney Callahan
- Chick Chandler as Snapper Doolan
- Douglas Fowley as J.E. 'Dutch' Moran
- Robert Kellard as Johnny Martin
- Jane Darwell as Polly
- Jean Rogers as Helen Thomas
- June Gale as Muriel
- Ruth Hussey as Peggy Norton
- Cliff Clark as Det. Capt. Collins
- George Lynn as Henchman Blackie
- Eddie Marr as Eddie Morelli
- Lester Matthews as Uncle Phillip Gregory
