= The Mysterious Miss X =

1939 film by Gus Meins

- Directed by: Gus Meins
- Starring: Michael Whalen; Chick Chandler
- Distributed by: Republic Pictures
- Release date: January 10, 1939
- Running time: 65 minutes 53 minutes
- Country: United States
- Language: English

The Mysterious Miss X is a 1939 film directed by Gus Meins and starring Michael Whalen, Chick Chandler and Mary Hart.

== Plot ==
Out of work when their play about a police inspector closes, actors Keith and Scooter are traveling by bus when they run out of money to go further. A passenger, Julie Graham, helps them find a room. They instead find a dead body, with police suspecting them of killing a rich businessman named Pratt.

A new suspect emerges in the form of Pratt's secretary, Charlie Graham, when $5,000 in cash is found in his possession. Graham is arrested and daughter Julie calls family attorney Clarence Fredericks to represent him.

Meanwhile, the actors are mistaken for actual detectives when police find the script of their play. They resist a request for their help until the attractive Julie also asks, as does Alma Pratt, the dead man's widow, who offers them a fee to investigate. The boys place themselves in danger, discovering that Fredericks is the actual killer. They get out of town safely, with Julie riding alongside Scooter, now romantically involved.

== Cast ==
- Michael Whalen as Keith Neville
- Chick Chandler as Scooter Casey
- Mary Hart as Julie Graham
- Dorothy Tree as Alma
- Regis Toomey as Jack Webster
- Don Douglas as Clarence Fredericks
