= Honeymoon Deferred =

Honeymoon Deferred may refer to:

- Honeymoon Deferred (1940 film), an American mystery directed by Lew Landers
- Honeymoon Deferred (1951 film), a British-Italian comedy directed by Mario Camerini
