= Perils of the Royal Mounted =

- Theatrical release poster
- Directed by: James W. Horne
- Screenplay by: Basil Dickey; Scott Littleton; Louis E. Heifetz (as Louis Heifetz); Jesse Duffy (as Jesse A. Duffy)
- Starring: Robert Stevens
- Narrated by: Knox Manning
- Cinematography: James S. Brown Jr.
- Edited by: Dwight Caldwell; Earl Turner
- Music by: Lee Zahler
- Production company: Columbia Pictures
- Distributed by: Columbia Pictures
- Release date: May 29, 1942
- Running time: 275 minutes (15 episodes)
- Country: United States
- Language: English

Perils of the Royal Mounted is a 1942 American Northern film. It was the 18th serial released by Columbia Pictures. It starred Robert Kellard (aka Robert Stevens) as the hero, Sgt. Mack MacLane of the Royal Mounties, and Kenneth MacDonald as Mort Ramsome, the head villain. It also co-starred Nell O'Day, Iron Eyes Cody, Kermit Maynard and I. Stanford Jolley.

== Plot ==
The trading post of Sitkawan, Canada is taken by surprise when an Indian tribe attacks and massacres the settlers aboard a fur-bearing wagon train. Sergeant MacLane of the Royal Canadian Mounted Police is assigned to investigate the case. MacLane soon realises that the attackers were led by Mort Ransome, a nasty renegade, who had been conspiring with Black Bear, medicine man of the tribe, to incite the heretofore friendly Indians for his own gain. He also learns that two white renegades have kidnapped Diana Blake, daughter of the local post factor, and saves her from a runaway wagon just before it plunges over a cliff. Perils of the Royal Mounted also features stereotypically Northern genre elements including fur trappers, lumberjacks, trading posts, rebellious Indian braves, forest fires, avalanches, and a wide range of dangerous wildlife.

== Cast ==
- Robert Kellard as Sgt. Mack MacLane RCMP (as Robert Stevens)
- Kenneth MacDonald as Mort Ransome
- Herbert Rawlinson as Richard Winton
- Nell O'Day as Diane Blake
- John Elliott as Factor J. L. Blake
- Nick Thompson as Black Bear - Indian Medicine Man
- Art Miles as Chief Flying Cloud
- Richard Fiske as Constable Brady
- Rick Vallin as Little Wolf (as Richard Vallin)
- Forrest Taylor as Preacher Hinsdale
- Kermit Maynard as Constable Collins
- George Chesebro as Gaspard - Henchman
- Jack Ingram as Baptiste - Henchman

== Chapter titles ==
1. The Totum[sic] Talks
2. The Night Raiders
3. The Water God's Revenge
4. Beware, the Vigilantes
5. The Masked Mountie
6. Underwater Gold
7. Bridge to the Sky
8. Lost in the Mine
9. Into the Trap
10. Betrayed by Law
11. Blazing Beacons
12. The Mounties' Last Chance
13. Painted White Man
14. Burned at the Stake
15. The Mountie Gets His Man

_{SOURCE:}

== Other versions ==
- This serial was released in Latin America in March 1943, under the title Los Valientes de la Guardia, in English with Spanish subtitles.
