= Loose Ankles =

1930 film by Ted Wilde

- Directed by: Ted Wilde
- Written by: Gene Towne (continuity and dialogue)
- Based on: Loose Ankles; 1926 play by Sam Janney
- Starring: Loretta Young; Douglas Fairbanks, Jr.
- Cinematography: Arthur L. Todd
- Music by: Cecil Copping (uncredited); Alois Reiser (uncredited); Songs: Jack Meskill; Pete Wendling
- Production company: First National Pictures
- Distributed by: First National Pictures
- Release date: February 2, 1930 (Limited)
- Running time: 66-69 minutes
- Country: United States
- Language: English

Loose Ankles is a 1930 pre-Code romantic comedy with songs, produced and released by First National Pictures, which had become a subsidiary of Warner Bros. Pictures. The film was directed by Ted Wilde and stars Loretta Young, Douglas Fairbanks, Jr., Louise Fazenda and Edward Nugent. It was a remake of the 1926 silent film titled Ladies at Play, which First National previously produced. Both versions were adapted by Gene Towne from the 1926 play Loose Ankles by Sam Janney. Sam Janney was to direct the film but died in a car crash during production.

The film's copyright was renewed, so it was not in the public domain until January 1, 2026.

== Plot ==
Loose Ankles (1930)

Ann Harper Berry, a young socialite, receives an inheritance of $70,000 per year (approximately $1 million today) from her deceased grandmother. The will stipulates, however, that she will only receive the money after she has been married to someone who meets with the approval of her two prudish aunts Sarah and Katherine Harper. The will also stipulates that everyone will lose their inheritance if a scandal involving Ann occurs before she is married. In the case of a scandal, the entire estate will be donated to an organization for the welfare of cats and dogs.

Ann, who is furious at being denied the right to marry whom she pleases, decides to create a scandal. She advertises in the paper for an unscrupulous man to compromise her. Gilly Hayden answers the ad and arrives at Ann's apartment. In order to make the affair as scandalous as possible, Ann's maid asks Fairbanks to remove his clothing. Before the newspaper men arrive, Ann's two aunts show up and attempt to force Gilly to marry their niece. Gilly, not wanting to force Ann into marriage, jumps out the window with nothing on but a woman's robe.

By this time, Ann and Gilly, though they had only spent a short time together, have fallen in love. Lint Harper, Gilly's roommate, becomes interested when Gilly tells him what happened with Ann. He decides to try to get Ann to marry him in order to get a part of her fortune. He takes her to a nightclub called the Circus Cafe. While there, Ann meets Gilly and her two aunts, who are being escorted by two gigolos (two other roommates of Gilly), who have come to spy on their niece. The aunts become drunk through the machinations of the gigolos, and when the club is raided, they manage to escape with their aid. Ann blackmails her aunts into consenting to her marriage with Gilly, threatening to expose their scandalous behavior at the nightclub if they don't. This leaves the couple free to pursue their romance.

== Cast ==
- Loretta Young as Ann Harper Berry
- Douglas Fairbanks, Jr. as Gil "Gilly" Hayden
- Louise Fazenda as Aunt Sarah Harper
- Otis Harlan as Major Rupert Harper
- Daphne Pollard as Agnes, Lucy's maid
- Edward Nugent as Andy Martin
- Inez Courtney as Betty
- Ethel Wales as Aunt Katherine Harper
- Norman Selby as Terry Todd
- Raymond Keane as Linton "Lint" Harper
- Virginia Sale as Mrs. Berry of Walla Walla

== Songs ==
The songs were written by Jack Meskill and Pete Wendling, and the dances were staged by Roy Mack.

- "Loose Ankles" - sung by Inez Courtney
- "Whoopin' It Up"

== Preservation status ==
Loose Ankles survives intact, and it has been shown on Turner Classic Movies and is preserved in the Library of Congress.

== Home media ==
In early 2012, Loose Ankles was released on DVD by Warner Archive in a double bill with The Naughty Flirt, starring Alice White.
