= Arizona Bound (1941 film) =

1941 film by Spencer Gordon Bennet

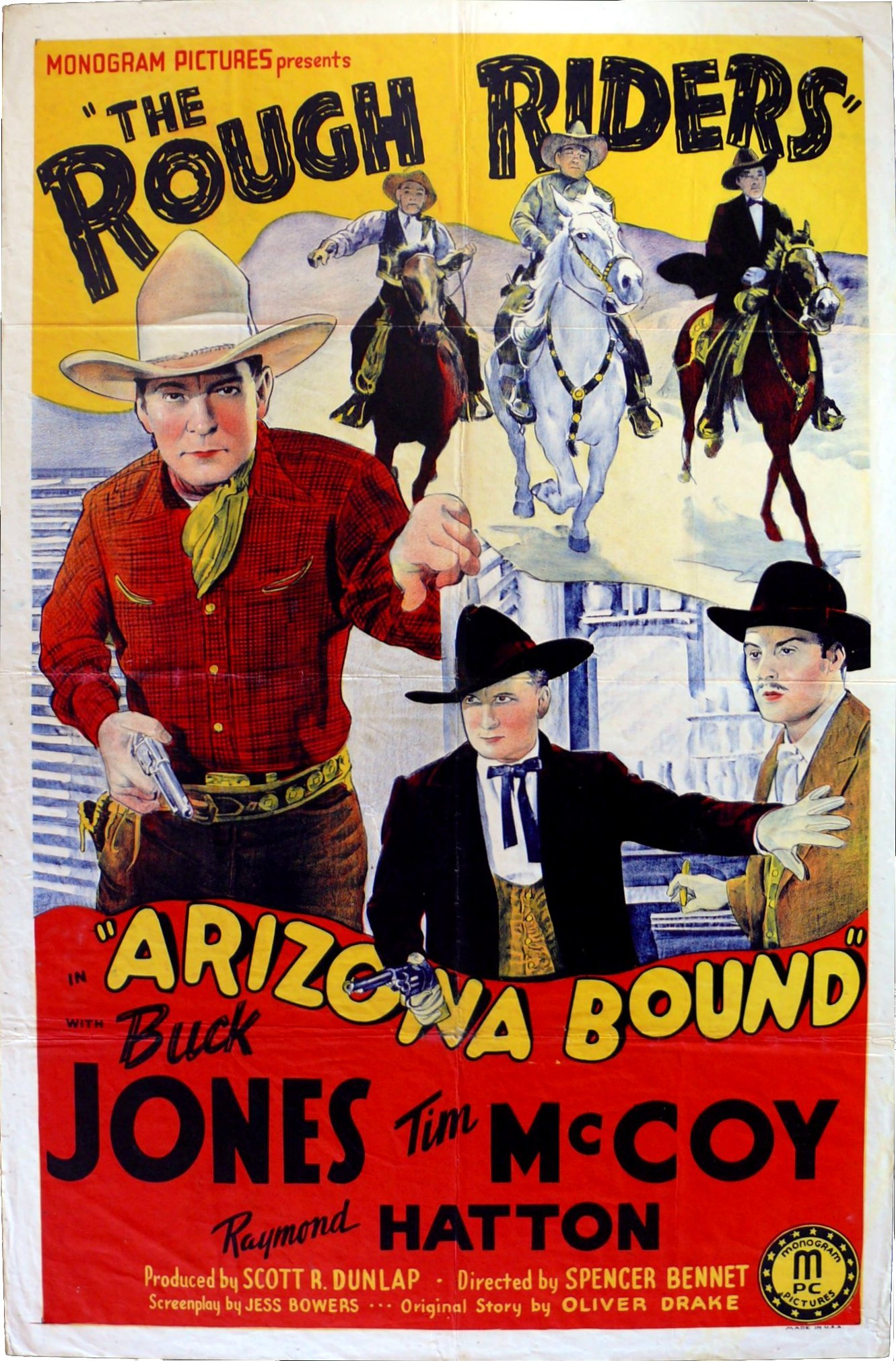
- Theatrical release poster
- Directed by: Spencer Gordon Bennet
- Written by: Oliver Drake (original story); Adele Buffington (screenplay)
- Produced by: Scott R. Dunlap (producer)
- Starring: Buck Jones; Tim McCoy; Raymond Hatton
- Cinematography: Harry Neumann
- Edited by: Carl Pierson
- Music by: Edward J. Kay
- Production company: Great Western Pictures
- Distributed by: Monogram Pictures
- Release date: July 19, 1941
- Running time: 57 minutes
- Country: United States
- Language: English

Arizona Bound is a 1941 American Western film directed by Spencer Gordon Bennet. This is the first film in Monogram Pictures' Rough Riders series, and stars Buck Jones as Marshal Buck Roberts, Tim McCoy as Marshal Tim McCall and Raymond Hatton as Marshal Sandy Hopkins, with Luana Walters, Dennis Moore and Kathryn Sheldon.

== Plot ==
Father killed, fiancé wounded, gold stolen, Ruth Masters is distraught over what's been happening to her Arizona stagecoach line and considers leaving the business for good. Saloon owner Steve Taggert is pleased, hoping to increase his holdings in Mesa City with her gone.

A retired marshal, Buck Roberts, rides into town, selling cattle. In the saloon he and the others encounter Colonel Tim McCall, a preacher who objects to Sunday sales of whiskey. Buck offers to assist Ruth by driving the stage carrying the next gold shipment, with her recovering sweetheart Joe going along to keep an eye on things for her. A cattleman, Sandy Hopkins, also volunteers to help.

The stage is robbed by masked men. Gold is found in Buck's saddlebags, so he is arrested and some of the townspeople demand that he be hanged. Joe reveals that Buck, anticipating the holdup, hid the gold safely while the robbers got away with nothing but worthless rocks. Buck, Tim and Sandy all turn out to be ex-lawmen, now working undercover to expose the criminals in town. They ride off their separate ways, their work here done.

== Cast ==
- Buck Jones as Marshal Buck Roberts
- Tim McCoy as Marshal Tim McCall / "Parson" McCall
- Raymond Hatton as Marshal Sandy Hopkins
- Luana Walters as Ruth Masters
- Dennis Moore as Joe Brooke
- Kathryn Sheldon as Aunt Miranda Masters
- Tristram Coffin as Steve Taggert
- Horace Murphy as Bunion (Buck's Ranch Hand)

== Production ==
The first in Monogram's Rough Riders series, this film started with a working title of The Rough Riders. The film was shot on location in Arizona.

== Soundtrack ==
- Male chorus - "The Rough Riders Theme" (Written by Edward J. Kay)
- Cowhands - "Home on the Range"
- Saloon Barflies and Henchmen - "Bury Me Not on the Lone Prairie"
- Saloon's piano player - "Oh, Susanna"
