= John Maxwell (actor) =

American actor (1918–1982)

John Maxwell (March 11, 1918 – July 18, 1982) was an American film and television actor.

== Biography ==
Maxwell was born in Spokane, Washington, and appeared in more than 100 films of the 1940s and 1950s, often uncredited. Occasionally he played larger roles in films, such as in The Prowler (1951). His television guest appearances included The Lone Ranger, Lassie, The Life and Legend of Wyatt Earp, The Rifleman and Bonanza.

Maxwell also starred as Pappy Sawyer in Disneyland's television miniseries The Nine Lives of Elfego Baca.

== Selected filmography ==
- Man from Headquarters (1942)
- Silver Skates (1943)
- Kismet (1944)
- Lady in the Death House (1944)
- The Last Horseman (1944)
- The Paleface (1948)
- Side Street (1950)
- The Damned Don't Cry (1950)
- The Asphalt Jungle (1950)
- Mystery Street (1950)
- The Enforcer (1951)
- Three Guys Named Mike (1951)
- The Prowler (1951)
- Without Warning! (1952)
- Captain John Smith and Pocahontas (1953) - Ship's Doctor (uncredited)
- The Bigamist (1953)
- Johnny Guitar (1954)
- Them! (1954)
- The Eternal Sea (1955)
- Gunfight at the O.K. Corral (1957)
