= Rockin' thru the Rockies =

1940 short film by Jules White

- Directed by: Jules White
- Written by: Clyde Bruckman
- Produced by: Jules White
- Starring: Moe Howard; Larry Fine; Curly Howard; Lorna Gray; Kathryn Sheldon; Dorothy Appleby; Linda Winters; Dick Curtis; Richard Fiske; Cy Schindell; John Tyrrell; Bert Young
- Cinematography: Henry Freulich
- Edited by: Art Seid
- Distributed by: Columbia Pictures
- Release date: March 8, 1940 (U.S.)
- Running time: 17:24
- Country: United States
- Language: English

Rockin' thru the Rockies is a 1940 short subject directed by Jules White starring American slapstick comedy team The Three Stooges (Moe Howard, Larry Fine and Curly Howard). It is the 45th entry in the series released by Columbia Pictures starring the comedians, who released 190 shorts for the studio between 1934 and 1959.

== Plot ==
Set in the Rocky Mountains circa late 1800s, the Stooges are guides tasked with escorting a trio known as "Nell's Belles" through mountainous terrain en route to their performance destination in San Francisco. When Curly's carelessness with a rifle frightens off the horses, the group is stranded overnight at the behest of Native American inhabitants who advise them to vacate the area promptly.

During the night, Curly is banished from the shared sleeping quarters due to his disruptive nocturnal behavior. In the morning, the Stooges find that their food stores have been consumed by a marauding bear. The trio busy themselves with making a sail out of canvas stage scenery and fastening it to their wagon with the intention to resume their journey using wind power. Afterward, their inept attempts at ice fishing in a nearby frozen lake prove futile when the "fish" on Curly's line turns out to be Moe.

Compounding their challenges, Nell, a constituent of the expeditionary group, brings alarming news of the abduction of the Belles by the indigenous community. However, the Belles quickly manage to elude their captors, prompting a hasty departure of the group from the Native American territory in their sail wagon.

== Production notes ==
Rockin' thru the Rockies was filmed on November 7–11, 1939. The film title is often mistaken for the 1945 feature film Rockin' in the Rockies starring the Stooges.

After the snow collapses the tent-like structure from the set of "Uncle Tom's Cabin" (in which the troupe performs in a traveling show), Curly falls through a curtain, lands on the girls in bed, and says, "The walls of Jericho collapsed." This is a reference to a scene in Columbia's It Happened One Night, where the flimsy barricade set up between Claudette Colbert and Clark Gable in a motor lodge was called the "walls of Jericho."

The name of the troupe, "Nell's Belles," is a play on the old expression "Hell's Bells," which of course would not have been permitted by the Production Code.

In this short Curly also briefly chants, "Give 'em the axe, give 'em the axe; right in the neck, right in the neck" which is a reference both to the Stanford Axe as well as the chant traditionally shouted by Stanford during the Big Game, which was popular in southern California during the early part of the 20th century.

The conclusion of this film is reminiscent of Early American folklore as the Stooges leave Indian territory a la Windwagon Smith.
