= Tango (1936 film) =

1936 film by Phil Rosen

- Directed by: Phil Rosen
- Written by: Arthur T. Horman; Vida Hurst
- Produced by: Maury M. Cohen
- Starring: Marian Nixon; Chick Chandler; Marie Prevost
- Cinematography: M.A. Anderson
- Edited by: Roland D. Reed
- Production company: Invincible Pictures
- Distributed by: Chesterfield Pictures
- Release date: February 14, 1936
- Running time: 66 minutes
- Country: United States
- Language: English

Tango is a 1936 American drama film directed by Phil Rosen and starring Marian Nixon, Chick Chandler and Marie Prevost.

== Plot ==
After her husband leaves her, a woman takes up a career as a tango dancer.

== Cast ==
- Marian Nixon as Treasure McGuire
- Chick Chandler as Oliver Huston
- Marie Prevost as Betty Barlow, Treasure's Roommate
- Matty Kemp as Anthony Thorne aka 'Tony' Carver
- Warren Hymer as Joe Sloan, Betty's Boyfriend
- Herman Bing as Mr. Kluckmeyer, Tango Hosiery
- George Meeker as Foster Carver, Tony's Brother
- Virginia Howell as Mrs. Carver, Tony's Mother
- Franklin Pangborn as Oscar the Photographer
- Kathryn Sheldon as Mrs. Alman the Landlady

== Bibliography ==
- Michael R. Pitts. Poverty Row Studios, 1929–1940: An Illustrated History of 55 Independent Film Companies, with a Filmography for Each. McFarland & Company, 2005.
