= Scotland Yard (1941 film) =

1941 film by Norman Foster

- Theatrical release poster
- Directed by: Norman Foster
- Written by: John L. Balderston; Samuel G. Engel
- Based on: Scotland Yard by Denison Clift
- Produced by: Sol M. Wurtzel
- Starring: Nancy Kelly; Edmund Gwenn; John Loder; Henry Wilcoxon
- Cinematography: Virgil Miller
- Edited by: Alfred DeGaetano
- Music by: David Buttolph; Cyril J. Mockridge
- Production company: 20th Century-Fox
- Distributed by: 20th Century-Fox
- Release date: April 4, 1941
- Running time: 68 minutes
- Country: United States
- Language: English

Scotland Yard is a 1941 American crime drama film directed by Norman Foster and starring Nancy Kelly, Edmund Gwenn and John Loder about a fugitive whose visage has been altered with plastic surgery. It is also known by the alternative title Uncensored. It is a remake of the 1930 film of the same title, which was in turn based on a 1929 play Scotland Yard by Denison Clift. The film's sets were designed by the art directors Lewis Creber and Richard Day.

== Plot ==
When bank robber Dakin Barrolles is on the run from the police, he manages to sneak into the house of respectable Sir John Lasher and his wife Sandra. He finds the drunken Sir Lasher in the course of verbally abusing his wife, fearing his upcoming military service. Barolles tells the banker off, then robs the couple of their car and a special locket with pictures of the couple inside. Unfortunately, Barrolles is caught as he is about to leave the house, by Inspector Henry James Cork of Scotland Yard. Barrolles manages to escape once again from the inspector, and disappears into the night.

Some time later Cork finally manages to track the robber down, discovering that he enlisted under a false name and became a respected soldier in the British Army. Cork's intelligence says that Barrolles was killed at Dunkirk, but he is in fact still alive. His face was terribly disfigured during battle and he was sent to a hospital in Scotland to recover. Since the doctors have no identification of the man, they look at the locket, which Barrolles is still carrying, and believe he is the man on the picture. They reconstruct his face so that he looks just like the picture, which is the face of Sir John Lasher. When Barrolles wakes up he decides to play along and pose as Lasher. He figures he can use it to rob the man's bank.

Barrolles goes back to Sandra, pretending to be her husband returning from the war, with amnesia, explaining the fact that he doesn't remember a thing about their lives together. Sandra is happy with him returning as a different man than when he left her. After some time Barrolles falls in love with Sandra, but is still set on robbing the bank. He goes to work as Lasher, and starts his first day with ordering a large transfer of gold. He meets a man named Hugh Burnside, who apparently is the uncle of Lasher's young mistress. Hugh asks Lasher/Barrolles to accompany him to the residence of a Lady Constance Fraser.

Hugh has discovered that Barrolles is a fraud, since he knows that Lasher is alive in a prison camp in Germany. It turns out Hugh and Lady Constance are the heads of a Nazi spy ring in England. Hugh threatens to hand Barrolles over to the police if he doesn't cooperate and transfer the gold to them. Barrolles sees no other alternative than to play along. Cork discovers the truth about Barrolles' operation and impersonation of Lasher. He comes to the Lasher home and returns the locket to Sandra. She realizes that Barrolles is an impostor. She goes to visit Barrolles at the bank office and unknowingly becomes part of the gold transfer.

Barrolles had time to send a message to Cork about the transfer, who arrives in time to stop the gold from being shipped. Cork catches the two spies and tells Barrolles that he is pardoned by the government because of his distinguished service for his country. Barrolles returns to Sandra and they confess their love for each other, but decide to put their relationship on hold until the real Lasher is safely back home from the war.

== Cast ==
- Nancy Kelly as Lady Sandra Lasher
- Edmund Gwenn as Inspector Cork
- John Loder as Sir John Lasher
- Henry Wilcoxon as Dakin Barrolles
- Melville Cooper as Dr. Crownfield
- Gilbert Emery as Sir Clive Heathcote
- Norma Varden as Lady Heathcote
- Leyland Hodgson as Henderson
- Lionel Pape as Hugh Burnside
- Lilian Bond as Lady Constance
- Leo G. Carroll as Craven
- Billy Bevan as Porter
- Sidney Bracey as Train Attendant
- Holmes Herbert as Dr. Woodward
- Doris Lloyd as Miss Harcourt - Nurse
- Lester Matthews as Dr. Gilbert
- Forrester Harvey as Albert Herbert Higgins

== Bibliography ==
- Goble, Alan. The Complete Index to Literary Sources in Film. Walter de Gruyter, 1999.
- Fetrow, Alan G. Feature Films, 1940-1949: a United States Filmography. McFarland, 1994.
