= Man from Headquarters =

1942 film

- Directed by: Jean Yarbrough
- Screenplay by: John W. Krafft; Rollo Lloyd; Edmond Kelso
- Produced by: Lindsley Parsons
- Starring: Frank Albertson; Joan Woodbury; Dick Elliott; Byron Foulger; John Maxwell; Robert Kellard
- Cinematography: Mack Stengler
- Edited by: Jack Ogilvie
- Production company: Monogram Pictures
- Distributed by: Monogram Pictures
- Release date: January 23, 1942
- Running time: 64 minutes
- Country: United States
- Language: English

Man from Headquarters is a 1942 American crime film directed by Jean Yarbrough and written by John W. Krafft, Rollo Lloyd and Edmond Kelso. The film stars Frank Albertson, Joan Woodbury, Dick Elliott, Byron Foulger, John Maxwell and Robert Kellard. The film was released on January 23, 1942, by Monogram Pictures.

== Cast ==
- Frank Albertson as Larry Doyle
- Joan Woodbury as Ann Weston
- Dick Elliott as Elwin A. Jonas
- Byron Foulger as Hotel Manager Clark
- John Maxwell as Marvin
- Robert Kellard as Hotel Clerk
- Mel Ruick as District Attorney Johnson
- Gwen Kenyon as Hat Check Girl
- Jack Mulhall as Whalen
- Christine McIntyre as Telegraph Girl
- Max Hoffman Jr. as Louis Padroni
- Paul Bryar as Knuckles
- Arthur O'Connell as Goldie Shores
- Maynard Holmes as T. Fulton Whistler
- Charlie Hall as Newspaper Photographer
- Irving Mitchell as Nate
- George O'Hanlon as Weeks
