= Pier 13 =

1940 film

- Directed by: Eugene Forde
- Written by: Clark Andrews; Barry Conners; Philip Klein; Stanley Rauh
- Produced by: Sol M. Wurtzel
- Starring: Lynn Bari; Lloyd Nolan; Joan Valerie
- Cinematography: Virgil Miller
- Edited by: Fred Allen
- Music by: Cyril J. Mockridge
- Production company: Twentieth Century Fox
- Distributed by: Twentieth Century Fox
- Release date: August 23, 1940
- Running time: 64 minutes
- Country: United States
- Language: English

Pier 13 is a 1940 American mystery film directed by Eugene Forde and starring Lynn Bari, Lloyd Nolan and Joan Valerie. It is a remake of the 1932 film Me and My Gal with Spencer Tracy and Joan Bennett. The film's sets were designed by the art directors Lewis H. Creber and Richard Day. It was made by Twentieth Century Fox, and produced by Sol M. Wurtzel.

== Plot ==
A waterfront cop, Danny Dolan, meets an attractive waitress, Sally Kelly, whose sister, Helen Kelly, turns out to be romantically involved with Johnnie Hale, the criminal he is pursuing. Helen is initially implicated in a robbery committed by Johnnie but is ultimately exonerated by Dolan in the end. Grateful for assisting her sister, Sally and Danny become engaged at the end.

== Cast ==
- Lynn Bari as Sally Kelly
- Lloyd Nolan as Danny Dolan
- Joan Valerie as Helen Kelly
- Douglas Fowley as Johnnie Hale
- Chick Chandler as Nickie
- Oscar O'Shea as Skipper Kelly
- Adrian Morris as Al Higgins
- Louis Jean Heydt as Bill Hamilton
- Frank Orth as Dead Pan Charlie
- Stanley Blystone as Policeman
- Charles D. Brown as Captain Blake
- Maurice Cass as Howard
- Frank Darien as Old Man in Car
- Hal K. Dawson as Ticket Salesman
- Edward Earle as Peters
- Sherry Hall as Clerk
- Hamilton MacFadden as Reporter
- Kitty McHugh as Mary
- Mantan Moreland as Sam
- Don Rowan as Husky Man
- Hector V. Sarno as Italian
- Florence Shirley as Mrs. Forrest
- Harry Strang as Pier Official
- Ben Taggart as Detective
- Phil Tead as Photographer
- Harry Tyler as Alibi Joe
- Max Wagner as Tramp
- Fred Walburn as Shorty
- Jack Woody as Steward

== Bibliography ==
- Fetrow, Alan G. (1994). "Pier 13". Feature Films, 1940-1949: A United States Filmography. McFarland & Company. ISBN 9780899509143.
- Langman, Larry (1995). "Pier 13". A Guide to American Crime Films of the Forties and Fifties. Greenwood Press. ISBN 9780313292651.
- Schlossheimer, Michael (2001). Gunmen and Gangsters: Profiles of Nine Actors Who Portrayed Memorable Screen Tough Guys. McFarland & Company. ISBN 9780786409891.
