= Inez Courtney =

American actress (1897–1975)

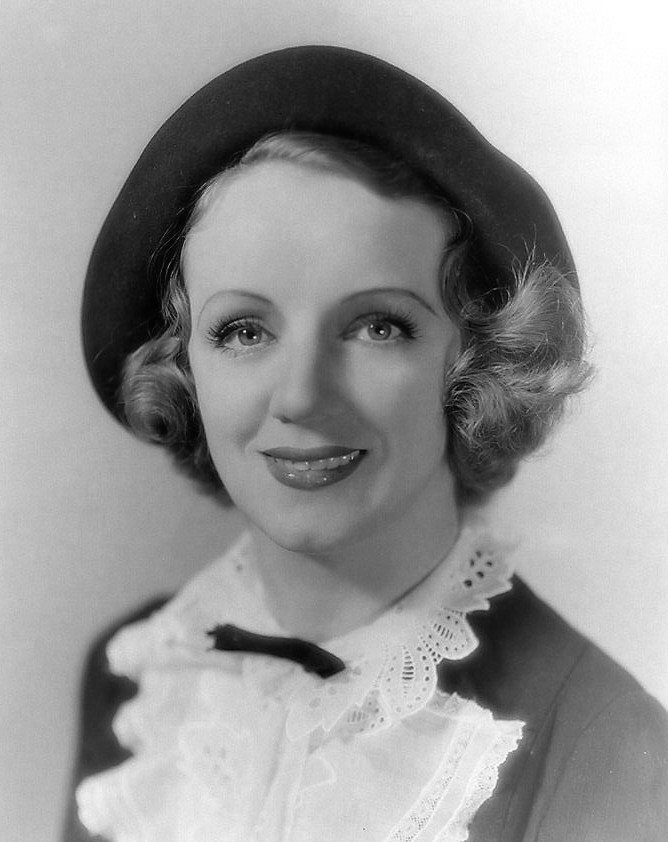
- Still for the romantic crime film It Couldn't Have Happened – But It Did (1936)
- Born: October 12, 1897; Amsterdam, New York, U.S.
- Died: April 5, 1975 (aged 77); Neptune, New Jersey, U.S.
- Occupation: Actress
- Years active: 1930–1940 (retired)
- Spouse(s): Luigi Filiasi (1935–?); Howard "Stanley" Paschal (1931–1933)

Inez Courtney (October 12, 1897 – April 5, 1975) was an American actress on the Broadway stage and in films.

== Early years ==
Born in Amsterdam, New York, Courtney came from a large Irish-American family. After her father's death when she was fifteen, she decided to go onto the stage.

== Career ==
Before beginning her theatrical career, Courtney worked as an apprentice in a millinery shop in New York City. According to a 1937 newspaper account, the shop's forelady discovered her during a nightly inspection, singing a German-dialect song and tap-dancing while wearing a long-plumed hat. The incident resulted in Courtney losing her first job. Courtney later said that, had it not occurred, she might still have been designing hats.

At age 16, Courtney was doing a specialty dance that earned her the nicknames of St Vitis, Mosquito and Lightning. In 1923 she began performing in vaudeville "after several successful engagements in musical comedy". Her skit combined comedy and dancing.

Courtney's first role as a singer and dancer came in the musical The Little Whopper in 1919. She became known among New York theatrical audiences for her work in Good News (1927), a musical comedy about college life. Her other credits include Spring Is Here (1929) and America's Sweetheart (1931). In the early 1930s, she left Broadway and went to Hollywood.

Courtney's early films included Loose Ankles (1930), Song of the Flame (1930), and Spring Is Here (1930). She acted in 58 films between 1930 and 1940. She secured her first movie work by asking Harry Cohn of Columbia Pictures for his assistance. She made her screen debut as Cousin Betty in Loose Ankles (1930). Her movie credits include The Raven (1935), Suzy (1936), The Shop Around the Corner (1940), and Turnabout (1940), her last film.

== Personal life and death ==
In July 1938, Courtney was injured on a film set when she sat in a chair on which there was a crochet needle. The needle became embedded in her flesh and required an operation for removal; a contemporary newspaper reported that it penetrated two inches.

On June 20, 1931, Courtney married broker Howard S. Paschal in Rye, New York. The marriage was not revealed publicly for one year. They were divorced on May 10, 1933. Courtney married Italian nobleman Marchese Luigi Filiasi, a wine merchant, in Los Angeles on September 28, 1935, whereby she acquired the title Marchesa, but did not use it. On April 5, 1975, Courtney died at the Jersey Shore Medical Center in Neptune, New Jersey.

== Partial filmography ==
- Makers of Melody (1929) dance number. 'The Girlfriend' with Allan Gould
- Loose Ankles (1930) as Betty
- Spring is Here (1930) as Mary Jane Braley
- Not Damaged (1930) as Maude Graham
- Song of the Flame (1930) as Grusha
- Bright Lights (1930) as Peggy North
- Sunny (1930) as 'Weenie'
- The Hot Heiress (1931) as Margie
- Big City Blues (1932) as Faun
- The World Gone Mad (1933) as Susan Bibens, Telephone Operator (uncredited)
- Cheating Blondes (1933) as Polly
- Hold Your Man (1933) as Maizie
- I Love That Man (1933) as Public Stenographer (scenes deleted)
- The Captain Hates the Sea (1934) as Flo
- Jealousy (1934) as Penny
- Broadway Bill (1934) as Nurse Mae (uncredited)
- Sweepstake Annie (1935) as Marge
- Carnival (1935) as Girl (uncredited)
- Men of the Hour (1935) as Miss Allison (uncredited)
- Air Hawks (1935) as Second Nurse (uncredited)
- Break of Hearts (1935) as Miss Wilson
- Dizzy Dames (1935) as Arlette
- The Raven (1935) as Mary Burns
- The Affair of Susan (1935) as Mrs. Barnes
- The Girl Friend (1935) as Hilda
- Ship Cafe (1935) as Molly
- Another Face (1935) as Mamie, Joe's Secretary (uncredited)
- Millions in the Air (1935) as Miss Waterbury
- Magnificent Obsession (1935) as Nurse May (uncredited)
- The Reckless Way (1936) as Laura Jones
- Brilliant Marriage (1936) as Sally Patrick
- Let's Sing Again (1936) as Marge Wilkins
- Three Cheers for Love (1936) as Dorothy
- Suzy (1936) as Maisie
- It Couldn't Have Happened – But It Did (1936) as Linda Sands
- Two in a Crowd (1936) as Mrs. Flynn (uncredited)
- Wedding Present (1936) as Mary Lawson
- Time Out for Romance (1937) as Mabel
- Clarence (1937) as Della
- The Hit Parade (1937) as Tillie
- Armored Car (1937) as Blind Date
- The 13th Man (1937) as Julie Walters
- Partners in Crime (1937) as Lillian Tate
- The Hurricane (1937) as Girl on Ship (uncredited)
- Having Wonderful Time (1938) as Emma
- Crime Ring (1938) as Kitty
- Letter of Introduction (1938) as Woman at Barry's Party (uncredited)
- Five of a Kind (1938) as Libby Long
- Beauty for the Asking (1939) as Gwen Morrison
- Blondie Meets the Boss (1939) as Betty Lou Wood
- When Tomorrow Comes (1939) as Waitress (uncredited)
- Missing Evidence (1939) as Nellie Conrad
- The Shop Around the Corner (1940) as Ilona
- The Farmer's Daughter (1940) as Emily French
- Turnabout (1940) as Miss Edwards (final film role)

== Bibliography ==
- Albert Lea, Minnesota Evening Tribune, Friday, August 10, 1936, p. 6.
- Oakland, California Tribune, Smile!-It Pays, Sunday, December 13, 1936. p. 72.
- Winnipeg, Manitoba Free Press, Saturday, May 17, 1930, p. 23.
