= I'll Sell My Life =

1941 film

- Directed by: Elmer Clifton
- Written by: Walter Ripperger; George Rosener; Elmer Clifton
- Produced by: Max Alexander; George M. Merrick
- Starring: Rose Hobart; Michael Whalen; Joan Woodbury
- Cinematography: Edward Linden
- Edited by: Charles Henkel Jr.
- Music by: Marvin Hatley
- Production company: Merrick-Alexander Productions
- Distributed by: Select Attractions; Renown Pictures (UK)
- Release date: September 12, 1941
- Running time: 73 minutes
- Country: United States
- Language: English

I'll Sell My Life is a 1941 American crime film directed by Elmer Clifton and starring Rose Hobart, Michael Whalen and Joan Woodbury. The film was based on the Street & Smith I'll Buy Your Life by Walter Ripperger.

== Plot ==
Two hirelings report to their boss Mr. Bochini that they witnessed his lover being murdered by another woman unknown to them.

Mordecai Breen the editor of a small newspaper called "The Friend in Need", notices an unusual classified advertisement offering "I'll Buy Your Life". He visits the address where he views Dale Layden waiting to be interviewed, but another woman named Valencia Duncan tells Breen that Albert Darnell, who placed the ad will only see women.

Dale needs the $20.000 offered to pay for an operation to restore her brother's sight. Darnell informs her that she will receive $2000 now, with the rest of the money to be paid to the person or office of her choice after he own death.

Breen smells a story, Darnell, a published mystery author tells Breen that he has offered money to people to get the stories of their lives to use for future stories, but Breen is unconvinced and tries to get the truth out of Dale, who gives Breen an alias but uses his office as the address where the balance of her money will be paid.

== Cast ==
- Rose Hobart as Dale Layden
- Michael Whalen as Mordecai Breen
- Stanley Fields as Bochini
- Joan Woodbury as Valencia Duncan
- Roscoe Ates as Happy Hogan
- Richard Bond as Albert Darnell
- Ben Taggart as Police Lt. Hammer
- Robert Regent as Philip Leyden
- Paul Maxey as Grady
- Munro Brown as Freddie
- Robert Walker as Lugger
- Eduardo Durant as Eddie, Orchestra Leader
- Frances Morris as Annie Winterbottom

== Bibliography ==
- Fetrow, Alan G. Feature Films, 1940-1949: a United States Filmography. McFarland, 1994.
