= Time Out for Romance =

1937 film by Malcolm St. Clair

- Theatrical release poster
- Directed by: Malcolm St. Clair
- Screenplay by: Lou Breslow; John Patrick
- Based on: the short story "Thanks for the Ride" by Eleanore Griffin and William Rankin
- Produced by: Milton Feld
- Starring: Claire Trevor; Michael Whalen; Joan Davis; Chick Chandler; Douglas Fowley; Benny Bartlett
- Cinematography: Robert H. Planck
- Edited by: Alfred DeGaetano
- Music by: Samuel Kaylin
- Production company: 20th Century Fox
- Distributed by: 20th Century Fox
- Release date: February 10, 1937
- Running time: 72 minutes
- Country: United States
- Language: English

Time Out for Romance is a 1937 American romantic comedy film directed by Malcolm St. Clair, written by Lou Breslow and John Patrick, and starring Claire Trevor, Michael Whalen, Joan Davis, Chick Chandler, Douglas Fowley and Benny Bartlett. It was released on February 10, 1937, by 20th Century Fox.

== Plot ==
Barbara Blanchard, the daughter of rags-to-riches divorced oilman Jim Blanchard, is going to marry Count Michael Montaine. When Jim receives a telegram from the count insisting upon a settlement of $500,000 before the marriage, he sends word of this to Barbara. However, the radiogram reaches her just after the wedding has taken place.

Furious, she drives off. Her mother Vera is determined to avoid public humiliation and to see her matchmaking scheme completed. Vera has her daughter declared mentally unbalanced and swears out a warrant for her arrest. When Barbara learns of this from the radio, she has her hairdresser Mabel dye her hair blonde. She also switches clothes with her. Barbara sets out for Los Angeles to meet her father's yacht. (However, Vera sends a wireless message to Jim, telling him the couple have reconciled. He believes her and heads to Acapulco instead.)

When police chase her for speeding, she abandons her car. After numerous attempts at hitchhiking fail, she pretends to faint. Bob and his friends the Dooleys both stop. Midge Dooley tells Bob to give her a lift, but he has had a bad experience with a blonde, plus he risks losing his job (driving a new car to California for Willoughby Sproggs as part of a four-car caravan). When she conveniently faints again, Bob gives in, but only until they reach the next town. She claims she is on the run because when she cashed her check from a walkathon she won, it turned out there was no money. At the next town, he loans her $10 and sends her on her way. She tries to send a telegram to her father collect, but cannot because she would have to show some ID. She sneaks back into Bob's car undetected.

On the way to Omaha, when Bob tries to get rid of her, Sproggs finds out about the unauthorized passenger. Barbara claims to be Bob's wife, and Midge backs her up, so Bob is forced to take her along.

When they stop for the night, Bob will not let her share his room. Roy, another one of Sproggs' drivers, tries to pick her up, but Bob knocks him down. She goes to sleep in the car. There she finds a necklace hidden away, which leads her to assume Bob is a thief. Meanwhile, Midge reads a newspaper article about a "blonde gun-moll" wanted in connection with a diamond robbery and thinks Barbara is her. Midge tells Bob.

Eventually, it is all sorted out. Roy turns out to be the jewel thief, Barbara's father will get her marriage annulled, and the couple embrace.

== Cast ==
- Claire Trevor as Barbara Blanchard
- Michael Whalen as Bob Reynolds
- Joan Davis as Midge Dooley, a dancer
- Chick Chandler as Ted Dooley, her husband and manager
- Douglas Fowley as Roy Webster
- Benny Bartlett as Orville Healy, Ambrose's young son
- Billy Griffith as Ambrose Healy, a driver and photography enthusiast
- William Demarest as Willoughby Sproggs
- Lelah Tyler as Cora Sproggs, Willoughby's wife
- Andrew Tombes as James "Jim" Blanchard
- Georgia Caine as Vera Blanchard
- Vernon Steele as Count Michael Montaine
- Inez Courtney as Mabel
- George Chandler as Simpson
- Fred Kelsey as Policeman
