= Tex Granger =

1948 film by Derwin Abrahams

- Poster of chapter 10 (Midnight Ambush)
- Directed by: Derwin Abrahams
- Screenplay by: Arthur Hoerl; Lewis Clay; Harry L. Fraser (as Harry Fraser); Royal K. Cole
- Story by: George H. Plympton
- Produced by: Sam Katzman
- Starring: Robert Kellard; Peggy Stewart; Robert 'Buzz' Henry; Smith Ballew
- Cinematography: Ira H. Morgan
- Edited by: Earl Turner
- Production company: Sam Katzman Productions
- Distributed by: Columbia Pictures
- Release date: April 1, 1948
- Running time: 270 minutes (15 episodes)
- Country: United States
- Language: English

Tex Granger is a 1948 American Western film serial featuring the title character as a masked cowboy referred to as The Midnight Rider of the Plains in the serial's subtitle. It was based on a character from the comic Calling All Boys while the plot was taken from The Last Frontier (1926), which was itself based on the novel of the same name by Courtney Ryley Cooper. Tex Granger was the 36th of the 57 serials released by Columbia.

== Plot ==
When Tex Granger rides into Three Buttes, Helen Kent persuades him to buy the local newspaper office. However, loan shark Rance Carson appoints the bandit Blaze Talbot as town marshal to act as his enforcer and soon the town is in chaos. With fighting between rival gangs, Tex dons a mask to become "The Midnight Rider of the Plains" and bring the criminals to justice.

== Cast ==
- Robert Kellard as Tex Granger, The Night Rider
- Peggy Stewart as Helen Kent
- Robert 'Buzz' Henry as Timmy Perkins (as Buzz Henry)
- Smith Ballew as Marshal Blaze
- Jack Ingram as Reno, Gang Leader
- I. Stanford Jolley as Rance Carson
- Terry Frost as Luke Adams, Carson Henchman [Chs.1-6]
- Jim Diehl as Conroy, Carson Henchmen
- Britt Wood as Sandy White
- Tiny Brauer as Morgan Carson Henchmen (as Bill Brauer)
- Duke as Duke, the Dog (as Duke the Wonder Dog)

== Chapter titles ==
1. Tex Finds Trouble
2. Rider of Mystery Mesa
3. Dead or Alive
4. Dangerous Trails
5. Renegade Pass
6. A Crooked Deal
7. The Rider Unmasked
8. Mystery of the Silver Ghost
9. The Rider Trapped
10. Midnight Ambush
11. Renegade Roundup
12. Carson's Last Draw
13. Blaze Takes Over
14. Riding Wild
15. The Rider Meets Blaze

_{Source:}

== See also ==
- List of film serials
- List of film serials by studio

Preceded by Brick Bradford (1947)	Columbia Serial; Tex Granger (1948)	Succeeded by Superman (1948)
