= Lewis Creber =

British art director

- Born: 18 January 1901; Rotherham, Yorkshire; United Kingdom
- Died: 1 December 1966 (aged 65); Los Angeles, California; United States
- Other names: Lewis Henry Creber; Lew Creber
- Occupation: Art director
- Years active: 1930-1967 (film)

Lewis Creber (1901-1966) (also billed as Lewis H. Creber) was a British art director who spent his career in the United States, working on well over a hundred films and television series. He worked for the major Hollywood studio Twentieth Century Fox for much of the 1930s and 1940s.

== Selected filmography ==
- Bachelor of Arts (1934)
- Mystery Woman (1935)
- Champagne Charlie (1936)
- Charlie Chan at the Opera (1936)
- Dangerously Yours (1937)
- Charlie Chan at the Wax Museum (1940)
- Scotland Yard (1941)
- Pier 13 (1940)
- Sun Valley Serenade (1941)
- Charlie Chan in Rio (1941)
- Berlin Correspondent (1942)
- Manila Calling (1942)
- The Hammond Mystery (1942)
- Margin for Error (1943)
- Dixie Dugan (1943)
- Bomber's Moon (1943)
- Linda Be Good (1947)
- Caged Fury (1948)
- Perilous Waters (1948)
- El Paso (1949)
- Captain China (1950)
- The Dividing Line (1950)
- Tripoli (1950)
- Hong Kong (1952)
- Destination Gobi (1953)

== Bibliography ==
- Frederic Lombardi. Allan Dwan and the Rise and Decline of the Hollywood Studios. McFarland, 2013.
