= Kathryn Sheldon =

American actress

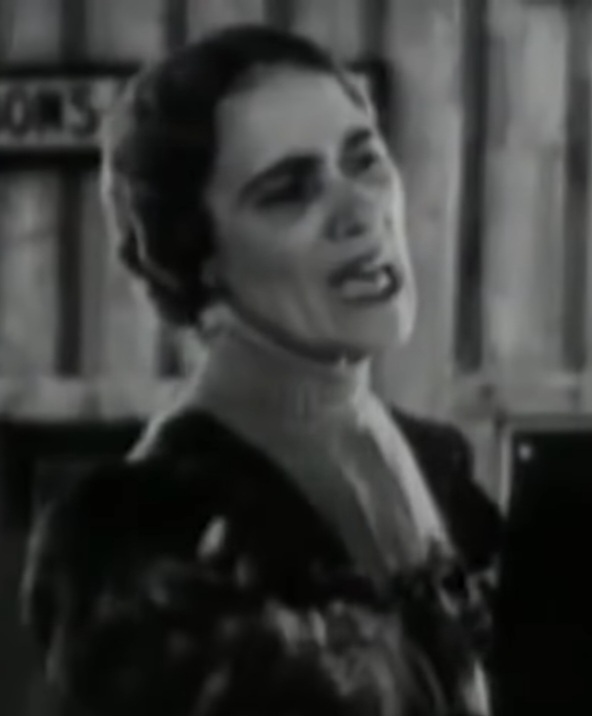
- Sheldon in the film Arizona Bound (1941)
- Born: September 22, 1879; Cincinnati, Ohio, U.S.
- Died: December 25, 1975 (aged 96); Los Angeles, California, U.S.
- Occupation: Actress
- Years active: 1916–1956

Kathryn Sheldon (September 22, 1879 – December 25, 1975) was an American film actress who appeared in over 100 films between 1916 and 1956.

Modern viewers will recognize Sheldon as the domineering Nell in The Three Stooges' 1940 short film Rockin' thru the Rockies. and as a harried dance recital teacher in the 1937 Our Gang short film, Rushin' Ballet.

Sheldon died in Los Angeles, California on Christmas Day, 1975.

== Partial filmography ==
- Society Fever (1935)
- Tango (1936)
- The Bridge of Sighs (1936)
- Brilliant Marriage (1936)
- Arbor Day (1936)
- Below the Deadline (1936)
- Circus Girl (1937)
- Racketeers in Exile (1937)
- Rushin' Ballet (1937)
- I'm From the City (1938)
- Sunset Trail (1939)
- Scandal Sheet (1939)
- Our Leading Citizen (1939)
- Rockin' thru the Rockies (1940)
- Out West with the Peppers (1940)
- Gold Rush Maisie (1940)
- Arizona Bound (1941)
- Richest Man in Town (1941)
- Miss V from Moscow (1942)
- Girls of the Big House (1945)
- The Happy Time (1952)
