= Chick Chandler =

American actor (1905–1988)

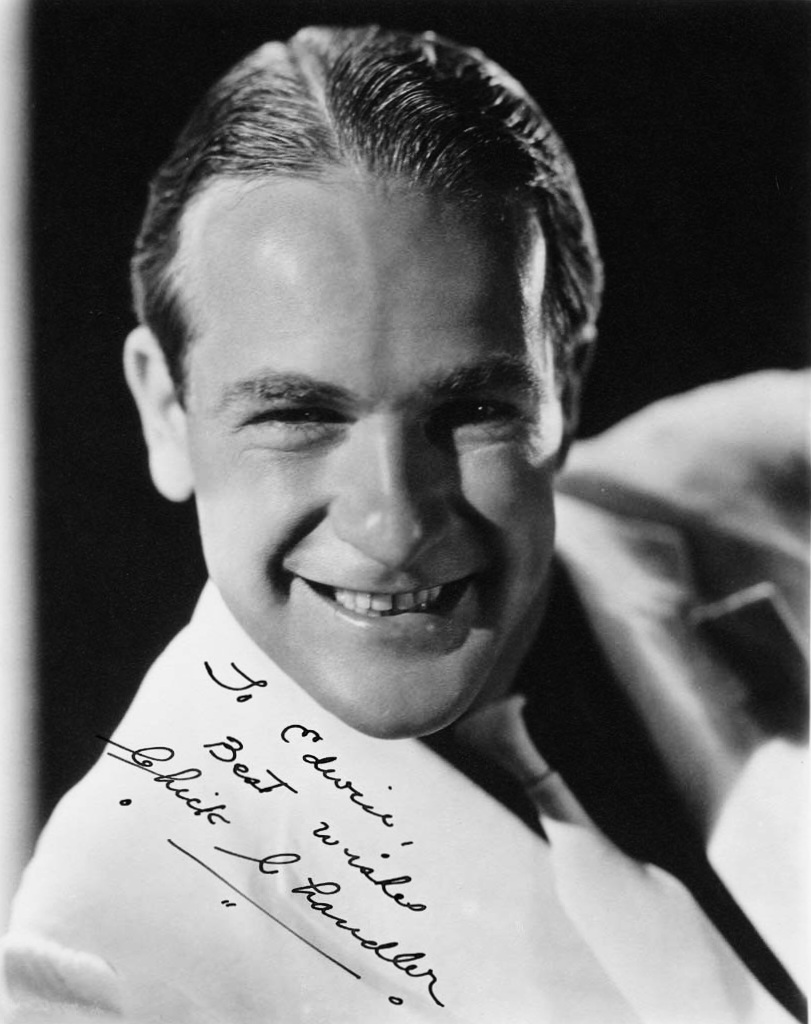
- Chandler in 1937
- Born: Fehmer Christy Chandler; January 18, 1905; Kingston, New York, U.S.
- Died: September 30, 1988 (aged 83); Laguna Beach, California, U.S
- Occupation: Actor
- Years active: 1925–1971
- Spouse: Eugenia Frontai (m. 1931)

Fehmer Christy "Chick" Chandler (January 18, 1905 – September 30, 1988) was an American film character actor who appeared in more than 130 films from 1925 through the mid-1950s. Chandler was known for his starring role as Toubo Smith in the Universal-produced 1955 syndicated television series Soldiers of Fortune.

== Early life ==
Born Fehmer Christy Chandler (named after his uncle, well-known architect Carl Fehmer), in Kingston, New York, to Colonel George F. Chandler and the former Martha Schultze (a sportswriter and daughter of Boston Symphony Orchestra conductor Carl Schultze). By the age of 12, he was appearing as a dancer and entertainer in local stage shows. His father, an army surgeon and organizer of the New York State Police, enrolled him in a military academy, The Manlius School, which he attended for three years, serving with distinction and rising to the school rank of corporal. At 16, though he was being groomed by his family for a military career, he dropped out to work on a tramp steamer and, later, to pursue work in vaudeville and to study dance at the school of famed choreographer Ned Wayburn.

== Career ==
Chandler maintained a successful career throughout the 1920s as a dancer and comedian in vaudeville and burlesque, at times teamed with Naomi Morton, granddaughter of vaudeville and Broadway star Sam Morton.

In 1930, Chandler, still billed as Fehmer Chandler, joined the cast of the Liberty Bell Filling Station radio show starring Chic Sale, as Rodney Gordon, the assistant to Wheel Wilkins (Sale), proprietor of the titular gas station. Two years later, he landed a role in the Ben Hecht-Gene Fowler Broadway play The Great Magoo. Spotting him there, film producer David O. Selznick signed Chandler, now billed under his boyhood nickname Chick, to a film contract at RKO, telling the press that Chandler was "a cross between Lee Tracy and James Cagney." Chandler, who had done behind-the-camera work for director Charles Brabin in 1923 and had appeared in at least one silent film as an actor, turned full-time to movie acting with his first films under contract, Sweepings and Melody Cruise, in 1933. He appeared mainly in supporting roles, mostly comic, in nearly 120 films over the next 36 years. In the late 1930s he was a fixture at Twentieth Century-Fox, playing wiseguy sidekicks in the studio's series films.

Under the pseudonym Guy Fehmer, Chandler wrote a screenplay about racing called The Quitter. There is no evidence the film was ever produced.

== Television ==
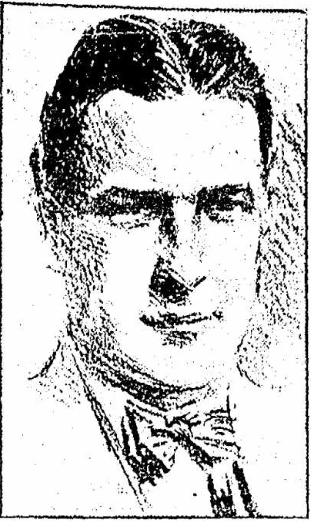
Drawing of actor Chick Chandler by his cousin, artist Howard Chandler Christy

In 1955, Chandler was cast in the starring role of Toubo Smith in the adventure series Soldiers of Fortune alongside John Russell as Tim Kelly. In the show, Smith and Kelly traveled the world engaging in treasure hunts, rescues, and exploration adventures. It brought Chandler his greatest fame. He was also a regular on the short-lived 1961 NBC comedy series One Happy Family. During the off-seasons, he toured the country in stock and musical theatrical productions such as Harvey and Annie Get Your Gun.

He kept active in guest appearances on television. He portrayed photographer "Billy Hackett" in the I Love Lucy episode "Ethel's Hometown." The Alfred Hitchcock Presents episode "Alibi Me" (1959) featured a memorable character performance, earning Chandler second billing. In the 1959 debut episode of NBC's Johnny Staccato, he played a police detective who was friendly with John Cassavetes' title character. In 1962 he appeared twice on Mister Ed, first as Mr. Hodges, the human partner of a performing elephant, in "Wilbur and Ed in Show Biz" (Season 3, Ep. 3), and then as John McGivney, a racetrack groom accused of doping, in "Horse Talk" (Season 3, Ep. 18). In 1965 he played the old fisherman Andy McGrew in the Lassie episode "Trouble at Paradise Lake" (Season 12, Ep. 7). In 1966 he played Riff Lawler in the Perry Mason mystery "The Case of the Avenging Angel." He played Ira Higgens on Daniel Boone episode, "Dan'l Boone Shot a B'ar", Season 3, Episode 1 Episode aired Sep 15, 1966. He retired in 1971 following a sixth guest appearance on Bonanza.

== Personal life ==
Chandler was a cousin of artist Howard Chandler Christy, but he is often referred to in period newspapers articles as Christy's "nephew" simply because Chandler referred to Christy as "Uncle Howard".

In February 1925, Chandler became engaged to Ziegfeld Follies performer, beauty contestant winner, and Christy model Dorothy Knapp, whom he had met in Christy's studio in or around 1922. Knapp broke off the engagement to pursue her career further, and Chandler then became partnered, both privately and professionally, with 17-year-old Sallie Sharon, whom he met at West Point. The pair formed a vaudeville team but never married. On April 4, 1931, Chandler married Eugenia "Jean" Frontai, a former contract performer with David Belasco's theatrical company. They were married 57 years, until Chandler's death from a heart attack on September 30, 1988, at the South Coast Medical Center in Santa Ana, California. Jean died the next day from cancer in the same hospital. The couple had no children.

Chandler had been an avid amateur auto racer—until his wife filed for a restraining order to make him stop, as he had promised to do upon their marriage.

== Selected filmography ==
- Red Love (1925) as Tom Livingston
- Sweepings (1933) as Gene's Friend (uncredited)
- Melody Cruise (1933) as Hickey
- Blood Money (1933) as Drury Darling
- Harold Teen (1934) as Lilacs
- The Party's Over (1934) as Martin
- Lightning Strikes Twice (1934) as Marty Hicks
- Murder on a Honeymoon (1935) as Dick French
- Circumstantial Evidence (1935) as James Richard 'Jim' Baldwin
- Alias Mary Dow (1935) as Jimmie Kane
- Tango (1936) as Oliver Huston
- In Paris, A.W.O.L. (1936) as Eddie
- Forgotten Faces (1936) as Chick
- Three of a Kind (1936) as Jerry Bassett
- Star for a Night (1936) as Eddie
- Straight from the Shoulder (1936) as Fly (scenes deleted)
- Woman-Wise (1937) as Bob Benton
- Off to the Races (1937) as Spike
- Time Out for Romance (1937) as Ted Dooley
- Nobody's Baby (1937) as Elevator Operator (uncredited)
- Sing and Be Happy (1937) as Mike
- Born Reckless (1937) as Windy Bowman
- One Mile from Heaven (1937) as Charlie Milford
- The Lady Fights Back (1937) as Steve Crowder
- Portia on Trial (1937) as Barker
- Love and Hisses (1937) as Sidney Hoffman
- City Girl (1938) as Mike Harrison
- Alexander's Ragtime Band (1938) as Louie
- Speed to Burn (1938) as Sport Fields
- Mr. Moto Takes a Chance (1938) as Chick Davis
- Time Out for Murder (1938) as Snapper Doolan
- While New York Sleeps (1938) as Snapper Doolan
- Kentucky (1938) as Betting Parlor Clerk (uncredited)
- The Mysterious Miss X (1939) as Dan 'Scooter' Casey
- Inside Story (1939) as Snapper Doolan
- Rose of Washington Square (1939) as Emcee at Theatre (uncredited)
- Hotel for Women (1939) as Ben Ritchie
- Hollywood Cavalcade (1939) as Assistant Director
- Missing Evidence (1939) as Jerry Howard
- Too Busy to Work (1939) as Cracker McGurk
- Swanee River (1939) as Bones
- Honeymoon Deferred (1940) as 'Hap' Maguire
- Free, Blonde and 21 (1940) as Gus
- On Their Own (1940) as Doc Duggan
- Pier 13 (1940) as Mickey Martin
- So You Won't Talk (1940) as Lounger (uncredited)
- Charter Pilot (1940) as Fred Adams
- Ride, Kelly, Ride (1941) as Knuckles
- The People vs. Dr. Kildare (1941) as Dan Morton
- Blondie in Society (1941) as Cliff Peters
- Puddin' Head (1941) as Herman
- Two in a Taxi (1941) as Sid
- The Bride Came C.O.D. (1941) as First Reporter
- It Started with Eve (1941) as Frank - Reporter (uncredited)
- I Wake Up Screaming (1941) as Reporter
- Cadet Girl (1941) as Benny Burns
- Remember the Day (1941) as Mr. Mason
- A Gentleman at Heart (1942) as Louie
- Home in Wyomin' (1942) as 'Hack' Hackett
- The Big Shot (1942) as Frank 'Dancer' Smith
- The Magnificent Dope (1942) as Reporter (uncredited)
- Baby Face Morgan (1942) as Oliver Harrison
- My Sister Eileen (1942) as Air Raid Warden (uncredited)
- Youth on Parade (1942) as Eddie Reilly
- Springtime in the Rockies (1942) as Stage Manager (uncredited)
- My Heart Belongs to Daddy (1942) as Jiggers Johnston (uncredited)
- Rhythm Parade (1942) as Speed
- He Hired the Boss (1943) as Fuller
- Action in the North Atlantic (1943) as Goldberg (uncredited)
- Spy Train (1943) as Stew Stewart
- Hi Diddle Diddle (1943) as Saunders
- The West Side Kid (1943) as Shoelace
- Minesweeper (1943) as Seaman 'Corny' Welch
- Johnny Doesn't Live Here Any More (1944) as Jack
- Seven Doors to Death (1944, starring role) as Jimmy McMillan
- Maisie Goes to Reno (1944) as Tommy Cutter
- Irish Eyes Are Smiling (1944) as Stage Manager (uncredited)
- Leave It to Blondie (1945) as Eddie Baxter
- Nob Hill (1945) as Wax Museum Guide (uncredited)
- Captain Eddie (1945) as Richard Lacey
- The Chicago Kid (1945) as Squeak
- Do You Love Me (1946) as Earl Williams (uncredited)
- Mother Wore Tights (1947) as Ed (uncredited)
- Blondie's Reward (1948) as Bill Cooper
- Music Man (1948) as Sanders
- Family Honeymoon (1948) as Taxi Driver
- Every Girl Should Be Married (1948) as Soda Clerk
- Hideout (1949) as Joe Bottomley
- The House Across the Street (1949) as Sanlon (uncredited)
- Holiday Affair (1949) as New Year's Celebrant (uncredited)
- Key to the City (1950) as Herman - Reporter (uncredited)
- The Great Rupert (1950) as Phil Davis
- Key to the City (1950) as Herman - Reporter (uncredited)
- Curtain Call at Cactus Creek (1950) as Ralph
- Bright Leaf (1950) as Tobacco Auctioneer (uncredited)
- Wyoming Mail (1950) as Saloon Waiter (uncredited)
- Mr. Imperium (1951) as George Hoskins (uncredited)
- Show Boat (1951) as Trocadero Stage Assistant (uncredited)
- Lost Continent (1951) as Lieutenant Danny Wilson
- Steel Town (1952) as Ernie
- Aaron Slick from Punkin Crick (1952) as Pitchman
- Private Eyes (1953) as Eddie the Detective
- The Eddie Cantor Story (1953) as Lesser (uncredited)
- It Should Happen to You (1954) as TV Engineer in Booth (uncredited)
- Untamed Heiress (1954) as Eddie Taylor
- A Star Is Born (1954) as Man in Car at Diner (uncredited)
- There's No Business Like Show Business (1954) as Harry (uncredited)
- 3 Ring Circus (1954) as Drop-the-Dip Pitchman (uncredited)
- Battle Cry (1955) as Captain Chaplin (uncredited)
- Alfred Hitchcock Presents (1956) (Season 2 Episode 7: "Alibi Me") as Lucky Moore
- Naked Gun (1956) as Shakey Wilson
- Once Upon a Honeymoon (1956) as Wilbur the Angel
- The Runaway (1961) as Joe Sullivan - Customs Officer
- Dangerous Charter (1962) as Kick (shot in 1958)
- It's a Mad, Mad, Mad, Mad World (1963) as Policeman Outside Ray & Irwin's Garage
- The Patsy (1964) as Hedda Hopper's Escort (uncredited)
- Nightmare in the Sun (1965) as Bartender
- The Girl Who Knew Too Much (1969) as Hunley Cobble
