= Ladies at Play =

1926 film

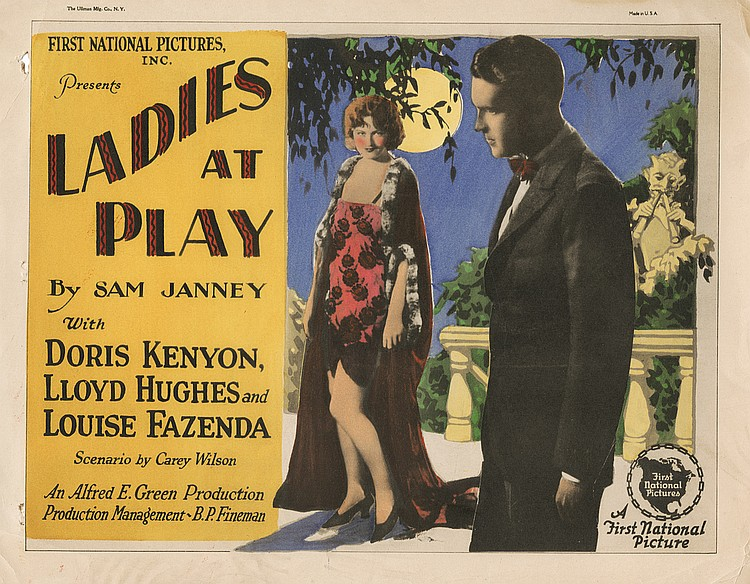
- Directed by: Alfred E. Green
- Written by: Carey Wilson; George Marion Jr.
- Based on: Loose Ankles; 1926 play by Sam Janney
- Produced by: John McCormick
- Starring: Doris Kenyon; Lloyd Hughes; Louise Fazenda
- Cinematography: George J. Folsey
- Production company: John McCormick Productions
- Distributed by: First National Pictures
- Release date: November 15, 1926
- Running time: 70 minutes
- Country: United States
- Languages: Silent; English intertitles

Ladies at Play is a lost 1926 American silent comedy film directed by Alfred E. Green and starring Doris Kenyon, Lloyd Hughes and Louise Fazenda.

It was remade as a sound film Loose Ankles in 1930.

== Cast ==
- Doris Kenyon as Ann Harper
- Lloyd Hughes as Gil Barry
- Louise Fazenda as Aunt Katherine
- Ethel Wales as Aunt Sarah
- Hallam Cooley as Terry
- John Patrick as Andy
- Virginia Lee Corbin as Dotty
- Philo McCullough as Hotel Clerk
- Tom Ricketts as Deacon Ezra Boody

== Bibliography ==
- Monaco, James. The Encyclopedia of Film. Perigee Books, 1991.
