= Robert Kellard =

American actor (1915–1981)

- Robert Kellard (far right) fires The Three Stooges from their job in 1946's Rhythm and Weep
- Born: Robert Dorsey Kellard; April 23, 1915; Los Angeles, California
- Died: January 13, 1981 (aged 65); Los Angeles, California, U.S.
- Other names: Bob Kellard; Robert Stephens; Robert Stevens
- Occupation: Actor
- Years active: 1937–1951
- Spouse: BeBe LaMonte (? – 1942) divorce

Robert Kellard (April 23, 1915 – January 13, 1981), aka Robert Stevens, was an American actor who appeared in over 60 films between 1937 and 1951.

== Early years ==
Kellard was born Robert Dorsey Kellard April 23, 1915, in Los Angeles, California. His father, Ralph Kellard (1884–1955), was also an actor.

Robert Kellard graduated from Hollywood High School and attended Santa Monica Junior College for a year. His older brother, Thomas, acted in films briefly before going into a different career.

== Career ==
=== Film ===
Kellard entered in Hollywood in 1937 in the film Annapolis Salute, directed by Christy Cabanne. (Another source says, "Robert made his film debut in ... A Connecticut Yankee (1931).")After that, he bounced back and forth from starring roles in low-budget films like Island in the Sky, Time Out for Murder, While New York Sleeps, and supporting roles in Boy Friend and Here I Am a Stranger, until he found the time to make two serials for Republic Pictures.

Although third billed, Kellard was ostensibly the hero in Republic’s adaptation of Sax Rohmer’s Drums of Fu Manchu. He followed this by playing the sidekick of Allan 'Rocky' Lane in the Zane Grey comic strip based King of the Royal Mounted. Kellard then starred two serials for Columbia Pictures, Perils of the Royal Mounted and Tex Granger.

He enlisted in the US Navy in 1942 and returned to Columbia in 1946, accepting supporting roles in the films Gilda and The Jolson Story. He also displayed his comedic chops in several Three Stooges comedies, such as Rhythm and Weep, They Stooge to Conga and Squareheads of the Round Table. His best known role with the Stooges was that of the menacing pirate Black Louie in Three Little Pirates.

After Kellard signed a contract with Columbia Pictures in 1942, the studio changed his name to Robert Stevens.

=== Stage ===
On Broadway, Kellard performed in Mother Lode (1937) and Hitch Your Wagon (1937).

=== Television ===
Kellard made his last appearance in a 1951 episode of ABC's Western television series, The Lone Ranger.

== Personal life ==
Kellard's marriage to BeBe LaMonte ended in divorce in 1942. His nephews, Rick and Phil Kellard are both television writers and producers.

== Death ==
Kellard died of post-obstructive pneumonia in the Wadsworth V.A. Medical center in Los Angeles, California, on January 13, 1981, at age 65.

== Selected filmography ==
- A Connecticut Yankee (1931)
- Annapolis Salute (1937) – Cadet
- Second Honeymoon (1937) – Reporter (uncredited)
- Nothing Sacred (1937) – Nightclub Patron (uncredited)
- Change of Heart (1938) – Artist (uncredited)
- Walking Down Broadway (1938) – Bob Randall
- Island in the Sky (1938) – Peter Vincent
- Battle of Broadway (1938) – Jack Bundy
- Josette (1938) – Reporter
- Gateway (1938) – Reporter (uncredited)
- My Lucky Star (1938) – Pennell
- Time Out for Murder (1938) – Johnny Martin
- Always in Trouble (1938) – Pete Graham
- While New York Sleeps (1938) – Malcolm Hunt
- Wife, Husband and Friend (1939) – Bank Teller (uncredited)
- Boy Friend (1939) – Tommy Bradley
- Stop, Look and Love (1939) – Dick Grant
- Here I Am a Stranger (1939) – College Student
- Drums of Fu Manchu (1940, Serial) – Allan Parker
- King of the Royal Mounted (1940, Serial) – Tom Merritt, Jr.
- Phantom of Chinatown (1940) – Tommy Dean
- Prairie Pioneers (1941) – Roberto Ortega
- Down in San Diego (1941) – Bell Captain (uncredited)
- Gentleman from Dixie (1941) – Lance Terrill
- Escort Girl (1941) – Drake Hamilton
- Shadow of the Thin Man (1941) – Policeman (uncredited)
- Man from Headquarters (1942) – Hotel Clerk
- Joe Smith, American (1942) – Mel Lewis (uncredited)
- Hello, Annapolis (1942) – George Crandall
- Sweetheart of the Fleet (1942) – Ens. George 'Tip' Landers
- Perils of the Royal Mounted (1942, Serial) – Sgt. Mack MacLane RCMP
- Parachute Nurse (1942) – Minor Role (uncredited)
- My Sister Eileen (1942) – Bus Driver (uncredited)
- The Spirit of Stanford (1942) – Cliff Bonnard
- Smith of Minnesota (1942) – George Smith
- Boston Blackie Goes Hollywood (1942) – Ticket Clerk (uncredited)
- Pardon My Gun (1942) – Henchman (uncredited)
- The Fighting Buckaroo (1943) – Fletch Thatcher (uncredited)
- Throw a Saddle on a Star (1946) – Burton (uncredited)
- Gilda (1946) – Man at Masquerade (uncredited)
- Night Editor (1946) – Doc Cochrane
- That Texas Jamboree (1946) – Henchman Tom
- The Return of Rusty (1946) – Sgt. Jack Beals
- The Unknown (1946) – James Wetherford
- Sing While You Dance (1946) – Buzz Nelson
- The Jolson Story (1946) – Henry – Orchestra Leader
- Lone Star Moonlight (1946) – Eddie Jackson
- Blondie's Big Moment (1947) – Joe (uncredited)
- The Thirteenth Hour (1947) – Truck Driver (uncredited)
- The Lone Hand Texan (1947) – Boomer Kildea (uncredited)
- Millie's Daughter (1947) – Hotel Clerk (uncredited)
- Framed (1947) – Man in Coffee Shop (uncredited)
- The Millerson Case (1947) – Dr. Prescott
- The Corpse Came C.O.D. (1947) – Reporter (uncredited)
- Roses Are Red (1947) – Interne
- Tex Granger: Midnight Rider of the Plains (1948) – Tex Granger, The Night Rider
- The Argyle Secrets (1948) – Melvin Rubin – Cop
- Canon City (1948) – Officer Winston R. Williams
- Bride of Vengeance (1949) – Guard (uncredited)
- Too Late for Tears (1949) – Policeman (uncredited)
- Red, Hot and Blue (1949) – Police Switchboard Operator (uncredited)
