= Missing Evidence =

1939 film directed by Phil Rosen

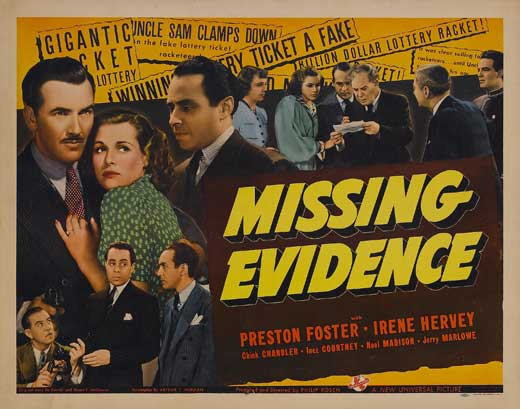
- Lobby card for the film
- Directed by: Phil Rosen
- Screenplay by: Arthur T. Horman
- Story by: Dorrell McGowan; Stuart McGowan
- Produced by: Phil Rosen
- Starring: Preston Foster; Irene Hervey; Inez Courtney
- Cinematography: Milton Krasner
- Edited by: Ted J. Kent
- Music by: Charles Previn
- Production company: Universal Pictures
- Release date: December 15, 1939 (US)
- Running time: 64 minutes
- Country: United States
- Language: English
- Budget: $85,000

Missing Evidence is a 1939 American drama film, directed by Phil Rosen. It stars Preston Foster, Irene Hervey, and Inez Courtney, and was released on December 15, 1939.

== Cast ==
- Preston Foster as Bill Collins
- Irene Hervey as Linda Parker
- Inez Courtney as Nellie Conrad
- Chick Chandler as Jerry Howard
- Noel Madison as Paul Duncan
- Joseph Downing as Marty Peters
- Oscar O'Shea as Pop Andrews
- Tom Dugan as Binky Cullen
- Ray Walker as McBride
- Cliff Clark as Allen Jennings
