= Dangerously Yours (1937 film) =

1937 film by Malcolm St. Clair

- Directed by: Malcolm St. Clair
- Written by: Lou Breslow; John Patrick
- Produced by: Sol M. Wurtzel
- Starring: Cesar Romero; Phyllis Brooks; Jane Darwell
- Cinematography: Harry Davis
- Edited by: Alfred DeGaetano
- Music by: Samuel Kaylin
- Production company: Twentieth Century Fox
- Distributed by: Twentieth Century Fox
- Release date: September 21, 1937
- Running time: 62 minutes
- Country: United States
- Language: English

Dangerously Yours is a 1937 American crime film directed by Malcolm St. Clair and starring Cesar Romero, Phyllis Brooks and Jane Darwell. It was a B Movie made by Twentieth Century Fox, with sets designed by the art director Lewis H. Creber.

== Plot ==
A detective, Victor Morell (Caesar Romero) assumes the guise of a jewel thief to infiltrate a criminal ring who he suspects of having stolen a fabulous gem. The comedy caper takes place on a transatlantic crossing from New York to Europe. The passengers include various crooks, insurance investigators, and the jewel thief himself, Julian Stevens (Alan Dinehart). In solving the case and bringing the criminals to justice, Morell finds that he has fallen in love with a member of the gang, Valerie Barton (Phyllis Brooks). She pledges to reform and is placed on probation - instructed to report the detective, now her fiancé.

== Cast ==
- Cesar Romero as Victor Morell
- Phyllis Brooks as Valerie Barton
- Jane Darwell as Aunt Cynthia Barton
- Alan Dinehart as Julien Stevens
- Natalie Garson as Flo Davis
- John Harrington as Louis Davis
- Douglas Wood as Walter Chandler
- Earle Foxe as Eddie
- Leon Ames as Phil
- Albert Conti as Monet
- Leonid Snegoff as Boris
