= Brilliant Marriage =

1936 film by Phil Rosen

- Directed by: Phil Rosen
- Written by: Paul Perez
- Produced by: Maury M. Cohen
- Starring: Joan Marsh; Ray Walker; Inez Courtney
- Cinematography: M.A. Anderson
- Edited by: Roland D. Reed
- Production company: Invincible Pictures
- Distributed by: Chesterfield Pictures
- Release date: March 25, 1936
- Running time: 64 minutes
- Country: United States
- Language: English

Brilliant Marriage is a 1936 American drama film directed by Phil Rosen and starring Joan Marsh, Ray Walker and Inez Courtney.

== Plot ==
New York newspaper reporter Garry Dane tries to smooth talk his way into an invitation-only party held at the Park Avenue home of an affluent family, the Allisons, but is escorted out by the butler. Dick Taylor, an aspiring civil engineer has a penchant for making repetitive marriage proposals to his longtime friend Madge, the only child of Rodney and Madeleine Allison. While alone at the party, he asks again, and Madge rejects him once more for she seeks romance, color and adventure. She playfully implies to Dick that she loves him as a friend, but he is too steady, reliable and proper for her romantic taste.

Garry has not started on his writeup, having failed to gain admittance to the Allison reception, until fellow reporter Sally Patrick, who has a crush on him, gives him the reception guest list. The Allisons unwind after all the guests have left when Madam Yvette Duval, a former French cellmate of Madge's natural mother, arrives and attempts extortion by threatening to publicly reveal the fact that Madge's deceased biological mother was imprisoned as an accessory to murder. Mr. Allison, fearing damage to Madge's reputation and difficulty in attracting proper suitors, agrees to meet up the next morning with the former inmate to arrange a cash payoff.

Madge, deeply troubled by the mysterious woman's revelation, subsequently exhibits observable behavioral changes, disconcerting to her parents. Madge meets the charming Garry at one of his parties and attracts his attention, witnessed by a jealous Sally. Dick, while horseback riding sees Madge and Garry on a date in Central Park. Dick visits Madge later that day to ask her to attend an evening concert, but Madge declines, stating she's exhausted from shopping all day. After Dick departs in his customary gentlemanly way, Mrs. Allison encourages her daughter to spend more time with him, but Madge expresses her infatuation with the older, more experienced and adventurous reporter.

An upset Sally sees Madge scurrying up the stairs to Garry's place after Sally and Garry just had a fight over the attention he has been giving Madge. Garry proposes marriage, even after Madge confides in him the startling news about her adoption and mother's incarceration, facts unknown to her until Yvette's visit a month ago. A dejected Sally enters a cocktail lounge, where Yvette is coincidentally sitting at the other end of a bar. An inebriated Yvette, in a celebratory mood, sings in French and tells the bartender she is sailing for France. Sally follows her hunch of a newsworthy story when she overhears Yvette mentioning the Allisons, and the bartender informs her Yvette is flashing a large sum of cash.

A savvy and opportunistic Sally takes home the ex-con, who blacked out, and rummages through her purse to find documents. A spiteful Sally pockets the cash as part of a scheme to convince Yvette to anonymously divulge the Allison family secret in exchange for getting back her money. The story exposing the true identity of Madge and her birth mother splashes across the front page. Madge, believing Garry betrayed her, breaks off all contact with him. Meanwhile, Dick visits Madge and successfully convinces her to accept his marriage proposal. However, Dick's mother goes behind his back and uses guilt and persuasion of disinheriting her son to influence Madge to break off their engagement.

Garry sneaks into Madge's bedroom to lure her back by mentioning exotic travels. They are set to sail tomorrow at noon. In the morning, a torn Madge tells Dick that she has changed her mind, is in love with Garry and will be going away with the newsman. Dick takes the news in stride and wishes her well. In the newsroom, Garry taunts Sally with the surprising reversal in his romantic fortune. A desperate Sally attempts to derail Garry's plan for the south seas but has difficulty inducing a relatively emotionless Dick to intervene, and thus, she resorts to fibbing about Garry already having a wife and child.

The merchant ship captain greets and informs Madge that a young man called to say he is temporarily delayed. While Madge is waiting for Garry to come on board, a joyful Dick appears instead and tells her he is prepared for their 8-month adventurous voyage. Dick explains that Garry is tied up, and indeed he is literally all tied up when Sally finds him at his pad and discovers a thousand-dollar bill left by Dick. Sally insists the money is going straight into a joint bank account and Garry must marry her if he wants his half. A persuaded Garry consents to Sally's proposal, and the captain marries Dick and a persuaded Madge, who asserts after all it is a brilliant marriage because it has romance.

- Joan Marsh as Madge Allison
- Ray Walker as Garry Dane
- Inez Courtney as Sally Patrick
- Hugh Marlowe as Richard G. Taylor, III
- Doris Lloyd as Mrs. Madeleine Allison
- Ann Codee as Yvette Duval
- Olive Tell as Mrs. Jane Taylor
- Holmes Herbert as Mr. Rodney Allison
- Robert Adair as Thorne, the Butler
- Barbara Bedford as Brenda
- Dick Elliott as Editor
- Herbert Ashley as Captain
- Kathryn Sheldon as Ellen, the Maid
- Victor Wong as Wong
- George Cleveland as Bartender
- Lynton Brent as Blaine

== Bibliography ==
- Michael R. Pitts. Poverty Row Studios, 1929-1940: An Illustrated History of 55 Independent Film Companies, with a Filmography for Each. McFarland & Company, 2005.
