= Speed to Burn =

1938 film by Otto Brower

- Film poster
- Directed by: Otto Brower
- Starring: Michael Whalen; Lynn Bari; Marvin Stephens
- Distributed by: 20th Century Fox
- Release date: August 26, 1938
- Running time: 60 minutes
- Country: United States
- Language: English

Speed to Burn is a 1938 American crime drama film, directed by Otto Brower and starring Michael Whalen, Lynn Bari, and Marvin Stephens.

== Cast ==
- Michael Whalen as Matt Kerry
- Lynn Bari as Marion Clark
- Marvin Stephens as Tim Turner
- Henry Armetta as Papa Gambini
- Chick Chandler as Sport Fields
- Sidney Blackmer as Hastings
