= While New York Sleeps (1938 film) =

- Theatrical release poster
- Directed by: H. Bruce Humberstone
- Screenplay by: Frances Hyland; Albert Ray
- Story by: Frank Fenton; Lynn Root
- Produced by: Sol M. Wurtzel
- Starring: Michael Whalen; Jean Rogers; Chick Chandler; Robert Kellard; Joan Woodbury; Harold Huber; Marc Lawrence
- Cinematography: Lucien Andriot
- Edited by: Norman Colbert
- Production company: 20th Century Fox
- Distributed by: 20th Century Fox
- Release dates: December 15, 1938 (New York); January 6, 1939 (United States)
- Running time: 61 minutes
- Country: United States
- Language: English

While New York Sleeps is a 1938 American crime film directed by H. Bruce Humberstone and written by Frances Hyland and Albert Ray. The film stars Michael Whalen, Jean Rogers, Chick Chandler, Robert Kellard, Joan Woodbury, Harold Huber and Marc Lawrence. The film was released on January 6, 1939, by 20th Century Fox.

== Cast ==
- Michael Whalen as Barney Callahan
- Jean Rogers as Judy King
- Chick Chandler as Snapper Doolan
- Robert Kellard as Malcolm Hunt
- Joan Woodbury as Nora Parker
- Harold Huber as Joe Marco
- Marc Lawrence as Happy Nelson
- Sidney Blackmer as Ralph Simmons
- William Demarest as Red Miller
- June Gale as Kitty
- Cliff Clark as Police Insp. Cliff Collins
- Edward Gargan as Police Sgt. White
- Minor Watson as Charles MacFarland
- Robert Middlemass as James Sawyer
