= Do You Love Me (film) =

1946 film by Gregory Ratoff

- Theatrical release poster
- Directed by: Gregory Ratoff
- Screenplay by: Robert Ellis; Helen Logan; Dorothy Bennett (additional dialogue); Frank Gabrielson (uncredited)
- Story by: Bert Granet
- Produced by: George Jessel
- Starring: Maureen O'Hara; Dick Haymes; Harry James
- Cinematography: Edward Cronjager
- Edited by: Robert L. Simpson
- Music by: Score: David Buttolph; Songs: Jimmy McHugh (music); Harold Adamson (lyrics)
- Production company: 20th Century-Fox
- Distributed by: 20th Century-Fox
- Release date: May 17, 1946
- Running time: 91 minutes
- Country: United States
- Language: English
- Budget: $2,550,000
- Box office: $3 million (US rentals)

Do You Love Me is a 1946 American Technicolor musical romance film directed by Gregory Ratoff and starring Maureen O'Hara, Dick Haymes and Reginald Gardiner . The film also features band leader Harry James and his Orchestra. It was produced and distributed by 20th Century-Fox. Betty Grable makes a cameo at the end of the film. At the time Harry James was married to contracted Fox star Betty Grable.

== Plot ==
Jimmy Hale, a successful singer, chases Katharine "Kitten" Hilliard, a prim music-school dean who transforms herself into a desirable, sophisticated lady after traveling to the big city. Trumpeter and bandleader Barry Clayton also pursues Katharine.

== Cast ==
- Maureen O'Hara as Katherine 'Kitten' Hilliard
- Dick Haymes as Jimmy Hale
- Harry James as Barry Clayton
- Reginald Gardiner as Herbert Benham
- Richard Gaines as Ralph Wainwright
- Stanley Prager as Jay Dilly
- Betty Grable as Barry's Fan in Taxi

== Production ==
The film was also known as Kitten on the Keys and was budgeted at $1.8 million. Zanuck disliked the footage and ordered reshoots that cost an extra $750,000. The film was shot on the sound stages of 20th Century Fox Studios in Century City, California.
