= Honeymoon Deferred (1940 film) =

- Theatrical release poster
- Directed by: Lew Landers
- Screenplay by: Roy Chanslor; Eliot Gibbons
- Story by: Roy Chanslor
- Produced by: Ken Goldsmith
- Starring: Edmund Lowe; Margaret Lindsay; Elisabeth Risdon; Chick Chandler; Joyce Compton; Cliff Clark; Anne Gwynne
- Cinematography: Elwood Bredell
- Edited by: Alex Troffey
- Production company: Universal Pictures
- Distributed by: Universal Pictures
- Release date: February 16, 1940
- Running time: 59 minutes
- Country: United States
- Language: English

Honeymoon Deferred is a 1940 American mystery film directed by Lew Landers and written by Roy Chanslor and Eliot Gibbons. The film stars Edmund Lowe, Margaret Lindsay, Elisabeth Risdon, Chick Chandler, Joyce Compton, Cliff Clark and Anne Gwynne. The film was released on February 16, 1940, by Universal Pictures.

== Plot ==
Detective Adam Farradene and his wife Janet Farradene have to postpone their honeymoon, because Adam has to investigate a murder. Janet gets really angry but wants to help out, despite Adam's insistence on working alone.

== Cast ==
- Edmund Lowe as Adam Farradene
- Margaret Lindsay as Janet Payne Farradene
- Elisabeth Risdon as Sarah Frome
- Chick Chandler as 'Hap' Maguire
- Joyce Compton as Kitty Kerry
- Cliff Clark as Police Insp. Mathews
- Anne Gwynne as Cecile Blades
- Julie Stevens as Eve Blades
- Jerry Marlowe as Jimmy Blades
- Joe Sawyer as Detective James
- Lillian Yarbo as Janet's Maid
