= Jerome Cady =

American screenwriter

Jerome Cady (August 15, 1903 – November 7, 1948) was a Hollywood screenwriter.

What promised to be a lucrative and successful career as a film writer - graduating up from Charlie Chan movies in the late 1930s to such well respected war films as Guadalcanal Diary (1943), a successful adaptation of Forever Amber (1947) and the police procedural Call Northside 777 (1948) - came to an abrupt end when he died of a sleeping pill overdose on board his yacht off Catalina Island in 1948. At the time of his death, he was doing a treatment for a documentary on the Northwest Mounted Police. There was a Masonic funeral service for him.

He received an Oscar nomination for Best Original Screenplay for Wing and a Prayer in 1944.

A native of West Virginia, Cady started as a newspaper copy boy. He was later a reporter with the Los Angeles Record, before joining the continuity staff of KECA-KFI, Los Angeles in June 1932. He spent time in New York in the 1930s with Fletcher & Ellis Inc. as its director of radio, returning to Los Angeles in 1936. He joined 20th Century Fox in 1940, having previously been employed at RKO between radio jobs.
