= Michael Whalen (actor) =

American actor (1902–1974)

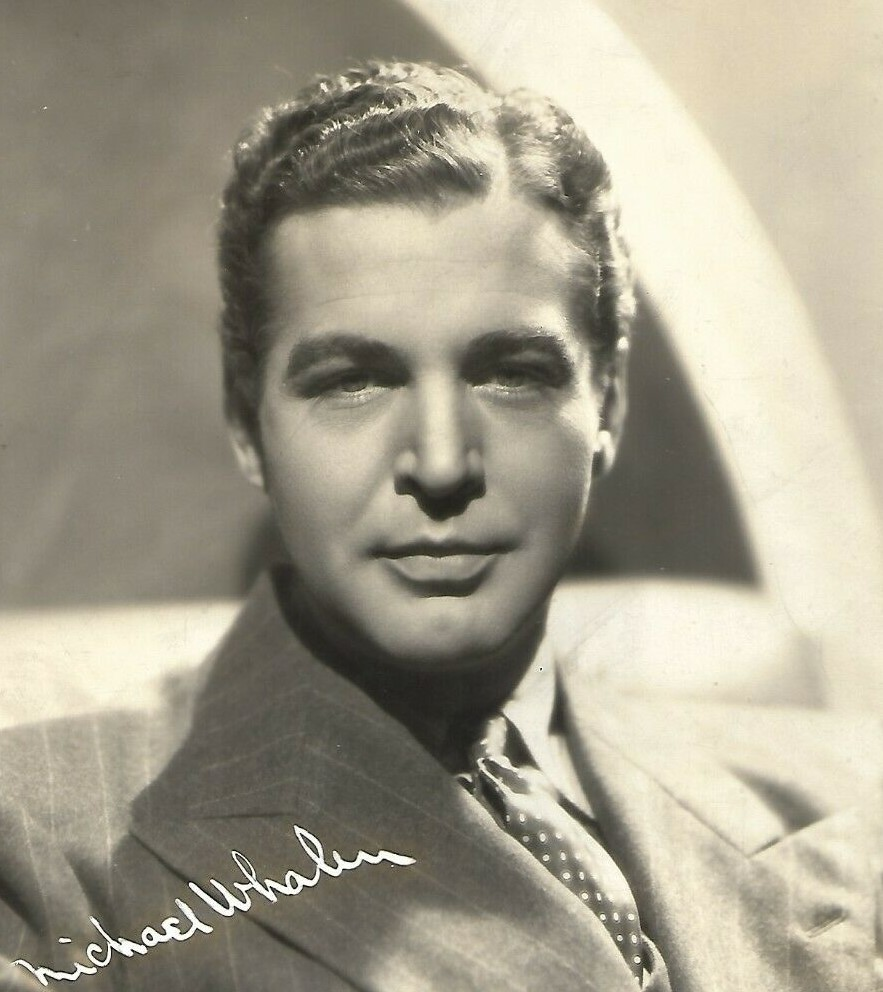
- Whalen in 1936
- Born: Joseph Kenneth Shovlin; June 30, 1902; Wilkes-Barre, Pennsylvania, U.S.
- Died: April 14, 1974 (aged 71); Woodland Hills, Los Angeles, California, U.S.
- Resting place: San Fernando Mission Cemetery
- Occupation: Actor
- Years active: 1935–1965

Joseph Kenneth Shovlin (June 30, 1902 – April 14, 1974), known professionally as Michael Whalen, was an American actor who starred in motion pictures and television, including Son of a Badman and Wee Willie Winkie.

The young Joe Shovlin was headed for a career in retail; he managed a Woolworth's department store in his native Pennsylvania until he resigned the post in 1925. A visit to New York led to his working on the stage and in radio; he sang on stations WGBS and WABC. He moved to Los Angeles in 1933 to continue his stage career, and was signed as a potential leading man by 20th Century-Fox in 1935. He adopted his mother's maiden name Whalen professionally.

Fox cast Whalen as the juvenile lead in four big-budget "A" pictures, where the darkly handsome actor registered pleasantly but not outstandingly. From then on Fox gave Whalen leading roles in lower-budget "B" pictures, in which he worked steadily. During the 1938-39 season, Whalen starred in three "Roving Reporters" features as crime-busting newspaperman Barney Callahan, but the series didn't catch on (the advertising for these films actually emphasized the supporting character players over Whalen). Whalen left Fox in 1939.

He freelanced at smaller studios for the next few years, before quitting the movies and returning to the Broadway stage. He returned to Hollywood in 1947 and worked in "B" pictures, mostly for producer Robert L. Lippert. With the major studios cutting back on their low-budget productions, many established players found themselves underemployed. Lippert could sign them economically for flat fees, giving his modest productions some luster for the marquee. Whalen also worked in television throughout the 1950s and into the 1960s.

== Selected filmography ==
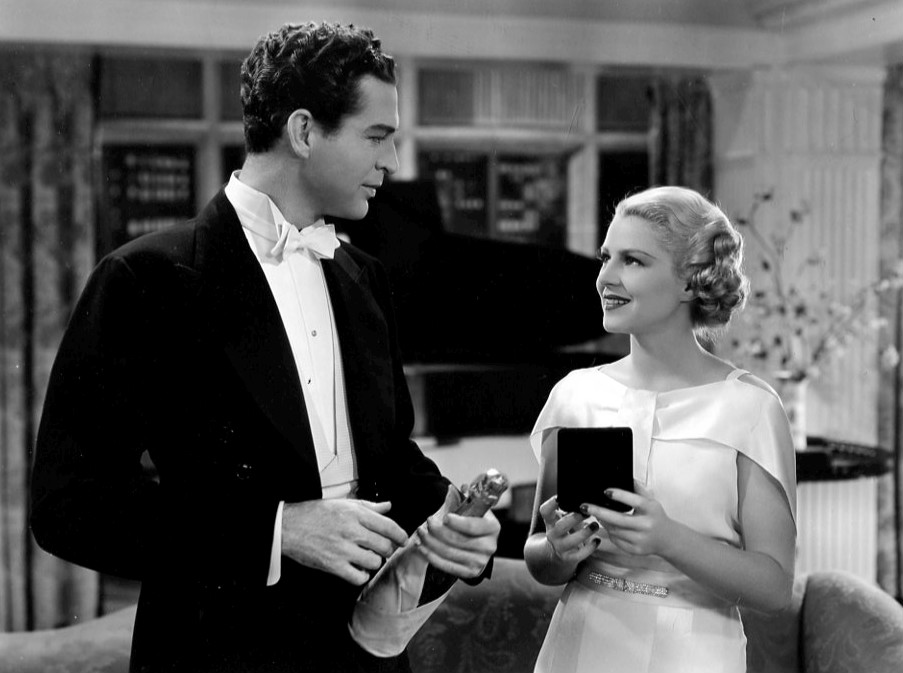
Whalen and Claire Trevor in Song and Dance Man (1936)

Year	Title	Role	Notes
1935	Professional Soldier	George Foster	
1936	Song and Dance Man	Alan Davis	
1936	White Fang	Gordon Weedon Scott	
1936	Poor Little Rich Girl	Richard Barry	
1936	Sing, Baby, Sing	Ted Blake	
1937	The Lady Escapes	Michael Hilton	
1937	Wee Willie Winkie	Lt. "Coppy" Brandes	
1937	Time Out for Romance	Bob Reynolds	
1938	While New York Sleeps	Barney Callahan	
1941	I'll Sell My Life	Mordecai Breen	
1947	Gas House Kids in Hollywood	Lance Carter	
1948	Parole, Inc.	Kid Redmond	
1948	Blonde Ice	Atty. Stanley Mason	
1949	Batman and Robin (serial)	Dunne	
1949	Tough Assignment	Hutchinson	
1949	Treasure of Monte Cristo	Lt. Michael Perry	
1950	Sarumba	Señor Valdez	
1952	Waco		
1955	The Phantom from 10,000 Leagues	King	
1958	Missile to the Moon	Dirk Green	
1959	Bat Masterson	Marshall	S1E11 "General Sherman’s March Through Dodge City"
1960	Elmer Gantry	Rev. Phillips	
1961	Sea Hunt (TV series)		Season 4, Episode 27
