= Robert G. North =

American screenwriter and reported CIA agent (1913–1954)

North as a private in the USAAF, 1942

Robert Guilford North (January 26, 1913 – December 20, 1954) was an American film writer and producer who reportedly served as an undercover CIA agent in Thailand. North, who served in the Office of Strategic Services (OSS) during World War II, was a minor screenwriter in Hollywood before moving to Thailand with his wife Maxine in 1950, where he established the Far East Film Company with Thai producer Ratana Pestonji, co-producing Santi-Vina before his death in 1954. Later sources describe the company as a front for CIA activities in the country.

== Early life and education ==
Robert G. North was born on January 26, 1913, in Boston, Massachusetts, a son of attorney John C. North and great-grandson of pioneer John W. North, founder of Riverside, California. North's father died when he was five, and he grew up with his mother, Brent W. North, in Alhambra, California, graduating from Alhambra High School. North attended the University of Southern California from 1932 to 1934, then went to the University of Hawaii as an exchange student. He transferred to Stanford University in 1936.

A skilled orator, North participated in debate competitions since high school and represented the universities in many varsity competitions, including a nationally broadcast radio debate with Harvard students in 1935 and an extended three-month tour of the continental United States in 1936, both as part of the Hawaii team. In 1937, he accompanied former president Herbert Hoover on an extended fishing trip, serving as a bodyguard. After graduating, he continued onto law school at Stanford, but was suspended in 1938 over a prank where he and a group of students performed a burlesque mocking university president Ray Lyman Wilbur. He went back to Hawaii and taught history at the Punahou School, before returning to California. Back at Stanford, he met Irving Cummings Jr., with whom he started a writing partnership, and took up public relations work in San Francisco.

== World War II ==
As the United States joined World War II, North enlisted in the US Army Air Forces in February 1942 and was stationed in Monterey, California and at Sheppard Field (in Wichita Falls, Texas), before being assigned to Barksdale Field in Louisiana, serving as public relations assistant there. In June, he won a war bond speech contest, and toured the country delivering speeches to promote bond sales. Later in November, he was sent for training at the Officer Candidate School in Miami Beach, Florida (later the Air Force Officer Training School).

In Honolulu after the Battle of Kwajalein in early 1944, North met General William J. Donovan, head of the Office of Strategic Services (the United States' wartime intelligence agency and precursor to the CIA), who recruited him to the OSS. After training in Washington, D.C., North was deployed for special operations in China, where he conducted intelligence missions behind enemy lines for the Fourteenth Air Force. In April 1945, North narrowly escaped when a convoy he was leading, carrying radio equipment for covert observation stations, was attacked by bandits. (Note: According to Richard Harris Smith, these were actually Chinese nationalist troops in disguise.) He was able to compel a local Chinese magistrate to supply troops to help reclaim the equipment, which allowed American planes to attack Japanese convoys passing through the observed areas. He was preparing to infiltrate the occupied cities of Nanking and Shanghai when the war ended in August 1945. North returned home aboard the USS General M. B. Stewart, leaving service with the rank of captain.

== Film career ==
After the war, North settled in Los Angeles and resumed his writing partnership with Cummings, penning scripts for producer Sol Wurtzel, who was a serial maker of B movies for 20th Century Fox. Their first produced screenplay was Dangerous Millions (1946), which was partly inspired by North's experiences in China. This was followed by Jewels of Brandenburg in 1947. Night Wind (1948), also produced by Wurtzel, was co-written with Arnold Belgard, while Cummings moved into production with The Sign of the Ram (1948). North was involved (though uncredited) in its production, which was where he met Maxine Woodfield, an executive secretary for Columbia Pictures. They married in 1949.

The following year, the couple moved to Thailand, ostensibly for North to research a film project. In 1953, he joined with Thai filmmaker Ratana Pestonji to open a Thailand-based production outfit, the Far East Film Company, also known by the trademark Hanuman Productions. North became vice president of the company, which served as a bridge connecting American interests and resources to the Thai film industry during the early stages of the Cold War, in which Thailand would serve as an important US ally.

The company's first production was Santi-Vina, a Bildungsroman film considered a landmark in Thai film history as the first to be shot on 35-mm color film as well as the first to win international awards—at the inaugural 1954 Southeast Asian Film Festival (later known as the Asia-Pacific Film Festival) in Tokyo. Its production was conceived specifically for the festival, whose deeper aim was to create a network of anti-communist film producers, and North, as a delegate for Thailand, was a strongly outspoken anti-communist voice in the festival's parent organization, the Federation of Motion Picture Producers in Southeast Asia (FPA).

North wrote the screenplay for Santi-Vina and co-produced the film with Rak Panyarachun. Although planned as the first of many high-quality productions, it was instead his only film from Thailand, as he died unexpectedly on September 20, 1954, three days after falling ill with polio. He was buried in the Roman Catholic Cemetery on Si Lom Road.

== CIA connections ==
Several later sources have claimed that North was an undercover agent of the Central Intelligence Agency, and that the Far East Film Company was a front for CIA activities in Thailand, importantly serving as a funding conduit to supply the Kuomintang in Burma. The company has also been reported as responsible for producing or distributing anti-communist propaganda films, in cooperation with Thai authorities. North was described by former CIA agent Joseph Burkholder Smith as a psychological warfare expert with the Office of Policy Coordination (OPC, the early CIA's covert operations branch). However, unlike other known anti-communist propaganda films of the time co-created by the US Information Service, Santi-Vina was strongly apolitical in tone, suggesting that it was not created as part of the propaganda effort. (Note: Somewhat ironically, the film was also purchased for screening in the Soviet Union and communist China.)

E. Howard Hunt, a former CIA agent convicted in the Watergate scandal, mentioned in his memoirs that it was he who informed North of the newly formed OPC while visiting him and Maxine in Los Angeles, to which North expressed interest and Hunt promised to recommend him to the agency. He also noted that North, "posted in Bangkok, was trying to establish a Thai film industry, hoping to make a movie about an epic Thai legend". (Note: This was probably a planned adaptation of the historical novel Phu Chana Sip Thit, the production of which was dropped in favor of Santi-Vina.) Screenwriter Charles Bennett noted that the script for Bangkok, which he co-wrote with North in 1950, was created for the CIA, probably intended as a cover, though it was never produced.

== Personal life and family ==
North had a large social circle; an obituary for his mother in Thailand's Standard newspaper in 1963 called him "one of the most popular Americans who have ever lived in Siam". He and Maxine were also friends with future US president Richard Nixon, and campaigned for him in the 1950 California Senate election, before moving to Thailand.

After North's death in 1954, Maxine, together with his mother, who had lived with the couple in Thailand, briefly returned to the United States, but later went back to Thailand and settled there permanently. Maxine North would go on to establish herself as a successful businesswoman, launching, among other ventures, Polaris, the first bottled water brand in the country.
