= Ralf Harolde =

American actor (1899–1974)

Ralf Harrolde
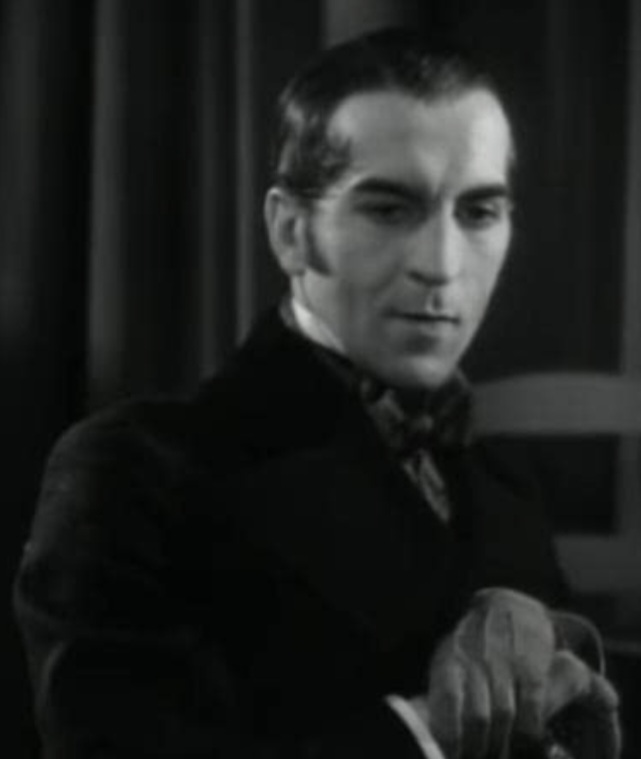
- Harolde in Dixiana (1930)
- Born: Ralph Wigger; May 17, 1899; Pittsburgh, Pennsylvania, U.S.
- Died: November 11, 1974 (aged 75); Santa Monica, California, U.S.
- Occupation: Actor
- Years active: 1920–1963
- Spouse: Catherine Cornell

Ralf Harolde (born Ralph Harold Wigger, May 17, 1899 – November 11, 1974) was an American character actor who often played gangsters. Between 1920 and 1963, he appeared in 99 films, including Smart Money with Edward G. Robinson and James Cagney, Jimmy the Gent with James Cagney and Bette Davis, Night Nurse with Barbara Stanwyck and Clark Gable, I'm No Angel with Mae West, Baby Take a Bow with Shirley Temple, A Tale of Two Cities with Ronald Colman, Our Relations with Laurel and Hardy, and Murder, My Sweet with Dick Powell.

Harolde was born Ralph Wigger in Pittsburgh, Pennsylvania. His father, William Wigger, operated a tobacco store in Pittsburgh. When Harolde finished grade school, he began working at a bank in Pittsburgh and taking night classes at Allegheny High School. He later was secretary to the director of the Sarah Heinz House, but his real interest was acting. He became an extra in productions at the Empire Theatre in Pittsburgh, and his first speaking part came in the comedy Officer 666 in March 1917. He changed his name to Ralf Harolde for the program of that play.

Harolde enlisted in the U. S. Marines during World War I and spent seven months at Marine Corps Recruit Depot Parris Island. His scheduled transfer to overseas duty was canceled after the armistice was settled four days before he was to leave. He returned to Pittsburgh and acted with The Pershing Players.

Harolde acted on stage before he worked in films. He had his own company in Lincoln, Nebraska, and performed with other stock companies there before he left in May 1928. He also acted on stage in Wilkes-Barre, Pennsylvania, and Columbus, Ohio. While in Columbus, he married Catherine Cornell, who became his business manager.

In 1938, Harolde was arrested on charges of trying to kidnap a boy after he was found talking to the boy several blocks from the child's school. When Harolde was booked in Hollywood on suspicion of kidnapping and loitering on public school grounds, he said, "I had no ulterior motive. I only wanted to take the little boy to a store and buy him some ice cream."

Harolde died in Santa Monica, California at age 75.

== Selected filmography ==
- Headin' Home (1920) - John Tobin
- Sunshine Harbor (1922) - Billy Saunders
- Babe Comes Home (1927) - Baseball Fan (uncredited)
- Officer O'Brien (1930) - Mike Patello
- Framed (1930) - Chuck Gaines
- Young Desire (1930) - Blackie
- Dixiana (1930) - Royal Montague
- Check and Double Check (1930) - Ralph Crawford
- Hook, Line and Sinker (1930) - John Blackwell
- Smart Money (1931) - Sleepy Sam
- Night Nurse (1931) - Dr. Milton Ranger
- Alexander Hamilton (1931) - James Reynolds
- The Tip-Off (1931) - Nick Vatelli
- Are These Our Children (1931) - Prosecutor (uncredited)
- Safe in Hell (1931) - Piet Van Saal
- The Secret Witness (1931) - Lewis Leroy
- Creation (1931) - Ned Hallet
- The Expert (1932) - Jim Crowley
- Play Girl (1932) - Willie (scenes deleted)
- Hollywood Speaks (1932) - Carp
- Winner Take All (1932) - Legs Davis - Diamond Ring Seller
- The Billion Dollar Scandal (1933) - Anderson (scenes deleted)
- Cheating Blondes (1933) - Lawson Rolt
- Picture Snatcher (1933) - Jerry
- Her Resale Value (1933) - Sidney Fletcher
- Voltaire (1933) - Minor Role (uncredited)
- Deluge (1933) - Norwood
- I'm No Angel (1933) - Slick Wiley
- Night Flight (1933) - Pilot
- Jimmy the Gent (1934) - Hendrickson
- The Witching Hour (1934) - Frank Hardmuth
- He Was Her Man (1934) - Frank 'Red' Deering
- Baby Take a Bow (1934) - Trigger Stone
- Fifteen Wives (1934) - The Electric Voice
- Once to Every Bachelor (1934) - Schuyler
- She Loves Me Not (1934) - J. B. Marshall
- Million Dollar Baby (1934) - Mac
- Sweepstake Annie (1935) - Hobart - Screenwriter (uncredited)
- The Perfect Clue (1935) - Sid Barkley
- Great God Gold (1935) - Frank Nitto
- Stolen Harmony (1935) - Dude Williams (uncredited)
- Silk Hat Kid (1935) - Lefty Phillips
- Woman Wanted (1935) - Monk Shelby (uncredited)
- Forced Landing (1935) - Burns
- A Tale of Two Cities (1935) - Prosecutor
- If You Could Only Cook (1935) - Swig
- My Marriage (1936) - Jones
- The Little Red Schoolhouse (1936) - Pete Scardoni
- Song and Dance Man (1936) - Crosby
- Human Cargo (1936) - Tony Sculla
- Our Relations (1936) - Gangster Boss
- 15 Maiden Lane (1936) - Tony
- The Accusing Finger (1936) - 'Spud'
- A Man Betrayed (1936) - Tony Maroc
- Her Husband Lies (1937) - Steve Burdick
- The Last Train from Madrid (1937) - Spanish Man (uncredited)
- One Mile from Heaven (1937) - Moxie McGrath
- Conquest (1937) - Lejeune (uncredited)
- Undercover Agent (1939) - Bartel
- The Rookie Cop (1939) - Joey Anderman, Roadhouse Owner
- The San Francisco Docks (1940) - Hawks (uncredited)
- Lucky Devils (1941) - R. W. Ritter
- Ridin' on a Rainbow (1941) - Blake
- The Sea Wolf (1941) - Agent Getting Johnson Shanghaied (uncredited)
- Horror Island (1941) - Rod Grady
- Raiders of the Desert (1941) - Sheik Talifer
- Rags to Riches (1941) - Slip Conlan
- No Greater Sin (1941) - Nick Scaturo (uncredited)
- Bad Man of Deadwood (1941) - Jake Marvel
- The Stork Pays Off (1941) - 'Stud' Rocco
- I Killed That Man (1941) - Nick Ross
- Sealed Lips (1942) - Lips Haggarty
- Jail House Blues (1942) - Charlie, the Chopper (uncredited)
- Broadway (1942) - Dolph
- Gang Busters (1942, Serial) - Halliger
- Baby Face Morgan (1942) - Joe Torelli
- Sin Town (1942) - 'Kentucky'Jones
- Secret Service in Darkest Africa (1943, Serial) - Riverboat Captain [Ch. 1]
- A Lady Takes a Chance (1943) - Croupier (uncredited)
- Captain America (1943, Serial) - Tate - Apartment Thug [Ch. 2] (uncredited)
- Roger Touhy, Gangster (1944) - Prisoner (uncredited)
- Murder, My Sweet (1944) - Dr. Sonderborg
- The Phantom Speaks (1945) - Frankie Teal
- Mr. District Attorney (1947) - Mr. Marsden (uncredited)
- Backlash (1947) - X-Ray Technician (uncredited)
- Jewels of Brandenburg (1947) - Koslic
- Desperate (1947) - Walt's Doctor (uncredited)
- The Crimson Key (1947) - Gunman
- Assigned to Danger (1948) - Matty Farmer
- Hazard (1948) - Taxicab Driver
- Behind Locked Doors (1948) - Fred Hopps
- Alaska Patrol (1949) - Steele
- Killer Shark (1950) - Slattery
- The Rise and Fall of Legs Diamond (1960) - Doctor (uncredited)
- A New Kind of Love (1963) - French Waiter (uncredited)
