= Santi-Veena =

Santi-Veena is the title of two Thai films, both directed by Tawee Na Bangchang (Marut) and written by Vichit Kounavudhi:

- Santi-Veena (1954 film), a 1954 film produced by Rattana Pestonji
- Santi-Veena (1976 film), a 1976 remake
