= Dangerous Millions =

1946 film by James Tinling

- Theatrical release poster
- Directed by: James Tinling
- Screenplay by: Irving Cummings Jr. Robert G. North
- Story by: Irving Cummings Jr. Robert G. North
- Produced by: Sol M. Wurtzel
- Starring: Kent Taylor; Dona Drake; Tala Birell; Leonard Strong; Rex Evans; Robert Barrat
- Cinematography: Benjamin H. Kline
- Edited by: William F. Claxton
- Music by: Darrell Calker
- Production company: 20th Century Fox
- Distributed by: 20th Century Fox
- Release date: November 27, 1946
- Running time: 69 minutes
- Country: United States
- Language: English

Dangerous Millions is a 1946 American drama film directed by James Tinling and written by Irving Cummings Jr. and Robert G. North. The film stars Kent Taylor, Dona Drake, Tala Birell, Leonard Strong, Rex Evans and Robert Barrat. The film was released on November 27, 1946, by 20th Century Fox.

== Plot ==
Combat pilot turned soldier of fortune Jack Clark is summoned to Shanghai with other potential heirs to seek a fortune left by Hendrick Van Boyden a decade before.

== Cast ==
- Kent Taylor as Jack Clark
- Dona Drake as Elena Valdez
- Tala Birell as Sonia Bardos
- Leonard Strong as Bandit Chieftain
- Rex Evans as Lance Warburton
- Robert Barrat as Hendrick Van Boyden
- Konstantin Shayne as Prof. Jan Schuyler
- Otto Reichow as Nils Otter
- Rudolph Anders as Rudolph Busch
- Franco Corsaro as Alfredo Charles
- Henry Rowland as Leo Turkan
- Victor Sen Yung as Lin Chow
