= Polaris drinking water =

Thai bottled water brand

Polaris was the first bottled drinking water brand in Thailand. It was originally produced by North Star Co., Ltd., founded in 1956 by American expatriate Maxine North and deputy foreign minister Rak Panyarachun. The company grew rapidly in the 1960s when the United States stationed large numbers of diplomatic and military personnel in Thailand during the Vietnam War, and expanded to become one of the largest drinking water bottlers in Asia. It dominated the market so much that the Polaris name became a genericized trademark for bottled water in Thailand. However, it encountered internal difficulties and increased competition in the 1990s, and the company, which had been listed on the Stock Exchange of Thailand in 1994, was declared bankrupt and liquidated in 2003.

== Early days ==
North Star Co., Ltd. was founded on 10 August 1956 by American expatriate Maxine North and her Thai business partner Rak Panyarachun, who was also deputy foreign minister. They had previously established Pure Gas Co., Ltd.—a carbon dioxide producer supplying soft drink manufacturers—in 1952. The gas plant had a good groundwater source for its cooling towers, which North, at the suggestion of a friend in the industry, realized could be used to introduce bottled water to the country. North says the brand name Polaris—the name of the North Star—occurred to her one night while gazing at the outside sky thinking of her late husband Robert.

The business initially found few customers. Local Thais were accustomed to collecting rainwater, which was plentiful, or boiling increasingly available tap water for drinking; bottled water was seen as a needless extravagance. An advertisement for water subscriptions placed in the Bangkok Post (then with 3,800 subscribers) returned only three enquiries, just one of which led to a sale. Customers—fifteen in the first month—were mostly limited to hotels, restaurants and the expatriate community.

North was unable to secure bank credit for the initial investment, and had to rely on funding from investors in the new company, in which she earned 23 percent of shares. She ordered 1,200 dozens of bottles from the Owens-Illinois Glass Company and imported machinery for the operation, which drew water from artesian wells and filtered and treated it with chlorine. The business turned out to be financially successful, making a 65 percent net profit in the first year. North noted in a 1957 interview, "Starting was a breeze, but there have been troubles since then in the general frustrations of a non-technical area."

The United States' diplomatic and military presence in Thailand increased sharply in the 1960s as Thailand became its main base of operations in the Vietnam War. This drove up demand for drinking water and greatly benefited Polaris, which had a virtual monopoly on the market. By 1971, North Star was delivering 170,000 litres (45,000 US gal) daily to customers, who numbered 7,600 in Bangkok alone.

Bottled water eventually found a market among Thai customers as the expanding urban middle class increasingly adopted a modern lifestyle. While several smaller producers also arose in response, Polaris continued to dominate the market, so much that the name Polaris became a commonly used genericized trademark for bottled water. By 1990, North Star produced 200 million litres (53M US gal) daily out of its plants in Nonthaburi, Chiang Mai and Hat Yai, making it one of the largest producers of bottled water in Asia. It also exported to Hong Kong, Australia, Malaysia, Singapore and Indonesia.

== Later days ==
North headed North Star for around thirty years, before handing off its management to Rodolfo U. Alvizo (a Filipino) in 1985. Under Alvizo, the company expanded and diversified in response to rising competition, most notably from beer producer Singha, who had made excursions into the bottled water market. Polaris introduced a soda water product (stepping into Singha territory), and the company also licensed the French soft drink brand Orangina for the Thai market in 1993.

The company was taken public in 1994, and was listed on the Stock Exchange of Thailand as North Star Public Company Limited (NSTAR). However, it began exhibiting management issues the same year, which worsened as the Asian financial crisis hit Thailand in 1997. The company was delisted in 1999, taken into receivership by creditors, and finally declared bankrupt on 2 October 2003, after which it was liquidated.

Polaris's exit from the bottled water market left a vacuum in which five major brands emerged to compete for market share, all operated by long-standing players in the food-and-drink business. Singha, who became the market leader after Polaris left, was joined by Crystal (produced by former Pepsi manufacturer Sermsuk), Pure Life (by Nestlé), Namthip (by Coca-Cola producer ThaiNamthip), and Chang (by ThaiBev, maker of Chang beer).

In 2015, the Polaris brand was revived under North Star International Co., Ltd., a daughter company of North Star originally set up in 1995, which had been restored to the register. However, the company soon went quiet, and failed to submit financial statements to the Department of Business Development from 2016 onwards.
