= Pensri Poomchoosri =

Thai pop singer and actress (1929–2007)

Pensri Pomchoosri เพ็ญศรี พุ่มชูศรี
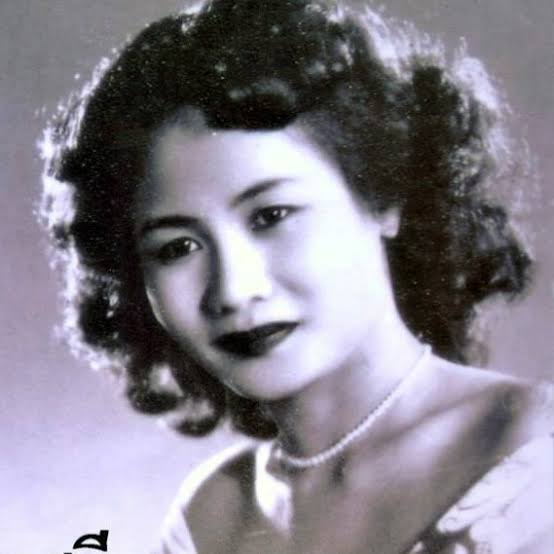

Background information
- Also known as: Aed (Thai: แอ๊ด); Jow (Thai: โจ๊ว)
- Born: Pongsri Pomchoosri; June 17, 1929; Phitsanulok, Siam
- Died: May 14, 2007 (aged 77) Samut Prakan, Thailand
- Genres: Pop
- Instrument: Singer
- Years active: 1940s–2000s

Pensri Pomchoosri (Thai: เพ็ญศรี พุ่มชูศรี; RTGS: Phensi Phumchusi; June 17, 1929 in Changwat Phitsanulok – May 14, 2007 in Changwat Samut Prakan) was a Thai pop singer and actress, active for more than five decades from the 1940s. She was named a National Artist of Thailand in 1991. She was married to writer Suwat Woradilok, also a National Artist, who died on April 15, 2007. Her nickname was Aed (Thai: แอ๊ด; RTGS: Aet) or Jow (Thai: โจ๊ว; RTGS: Cho).

== Biography ==
=== Early life and career ===
Born Pongsri Pomchoosri in Phitsanulok Province, she entered singing contests at the age of eight. She won several trophies including one from the Phu Khao Thong (Golden Mountain) fair, where a number of artists made their musical debuts. By the age of 12 she had made a record and had changed her name to Pensri. Her first record, Sila Tham Tang Ha (Five Precepts in Buddhism) was written by the renowned composer Siwa Woranat.

An oft-told legend about Pensri is that in 1941 her family had no money to pay medical bills for her father, who was hospitalized, and Pensri knelt down and sang for the doctor, who was so moved by her singing voice that he waived all the expenses.

As a teenager, Pensri joined a band led by Eua Sunthornsanan and Wes Sunthronchamorn, and received vocal training. She attracted national acclaim in 1947 when she performed "Sai Fon", a song composed by King Bhumibol Adulyadej, in a live broadcast. She recorded the song in 1948. Other songs she is remembered for include "Sakultala", "Man Sai Yoi" and "Rampan Sawad".

=== Marriage, jail ===
In 1951 and 1952, she joined a theater troupe of Suwat Woradilok. The two artists then married. Pensri was featured in the musical film, Dark Heaven, released in 1958. Suwat wrote and produced, and it was directed by Rattana Pestonji.

The couple became controversial when returned from a trip to China in 1957 and were charged with being engaged in communist activities and jailed. In jail, she remained by her husband's side, and refused early release on parole. She was jailed for four years. After her release, Pensri returned to singing.

=== Later life ===
In 1991, she was named a National Artist in performing arts (international music), alongside Suwat, who was named a National Artist for literature.

Suwat died on April 15, 2007. Less than a month later, on May 14, Pensri choked while having breakfast and collapsed. She was rushed to a local clinic, and then to Muang Samut Hospital in Samut Prakan, where she collapsed again and died of heart failure.

Funeral rites were held at Wat Makut Kasattriyaram in Bangkok, and her body was to be cremated along with that of her husband.
