= Deadline for Murder =

Deadline for Murder may refer to:

- Deadline for Murder (film), a 1946 American crime film directed by James Tinling
- "Deadline for Murder" (Murder She Wrote), a 1986 episode of the TV series
