= Suwat Woradilok =

Thai writer

Suwat Woradilok (Thai: สุวัฒน์ วรดิลก, July 14, 1923 in Bangkok – April 15, 2007, Amphoe Si Racha, Chonburi Province) was a Thai writer. He produced a variety of works, including short stories, novels, plays, scripts for television dramas, radio dramas and screenplays. He had several pen names, including S. Voradilok, Phrai Visanu and Rapheeporn. He was named a Thailand National Artist for literature in 1991.

His well-known books include Rajinee Boad (Blind Queen). He also penned the story for Dark Heaven, which was made into both a television drama and a 1958 film, directed by Rattana Pestonji.

Suwat was married to singer Pensri Poomchoosri, also a National Artist. The two married in the 1950s, after they worked together in a theater troupe. After a visit to China in 1957, Suwat and his wife were jailed on charges of being involved in communist activities. The two were jailed for four years, with Pensri spurning offers of early release to remain with her husband.

The couple had no children of their own, but adopted a child, Chatrachai Woradilok.

In his last years, Suwat suffered from heart disease and diabetes and was confined to bed in his home in Si Racha, Chon Buri Province. Less than a month after he died, his wife followed him in death on May 14, 2007.
