= He Hired the Boss =

1943 film

- Directed by: Thomas Z. Loring
- Screenplay by: Irving Cummings Jr. Ben Markson
- Story by: Peter B. Kyne
- Produced by: Sol M. Wurtzel
- Starring: Stuart Erwin; Evelyn Venable; Thurston Hall; Vivian Blaine; William T. Orr; Benny Bartlett
- Cinematography: Glen MacWilliams
- Edited by: Louis R. Loeffler
- Music by: David Buttolph; Lionel Newman; David Raksin
- Production company: 20th Century Fox
- Distributed by: 20th Century Fox
- Release date: April 2, 1943
- Running time: 72 minutes
- Country: United States
- Language: English

He Hired the Boss is a 1943 American comedy film directed by Thomas Z. Loring and written by Irving Cummings Jr. and Ben Markson. The film stars Stuart Erwin, Evelyn Venable, Thurston Hall, Vivian Blaine, William T. Orr and Benny Bartlett. The film was released on April 2, 1943, by 20th Century Fox.

== Plot ==
Hubert Wilkins is a bookkeeper and an air-raid warden in his town. He wants to marry Emily Conway, the company's secretary, but is short of money.

Both are fired after persuading the boss's son, Don Bates, to elope with Sally Conway, his sweetheart. But after Hubert uncovers a crime, he also discovers that he owns property worth $100,000.

== Cast ==
- Stuart Erwin as Hubert Wilkins
- Evelyn Venable as Emily Conway
- Thurston Hall as Mr. Bates
- Vivian Blaine as Sally Conway
- William T. Orr as Don Bates
- Benny Bartlett as Jimmy
- James Bush as Clark
- Chick Chandler as Fuller
- Hugh Beaumont as Jordan
- Ray Walker as Salesman
