= DeLuxe Color =

Color film process

DeLuxe Color or Deluxe color or Color by DeLuxe is Deluxe Laboratories' brand of color process for motion pictures. DeLuxe Color is Eastmancolor-based, with certain adaptations for improved compositing for printing (similar to Technicolor's "selective printing") and for mass-production of prints. Eastmancolor, first introduced in 1950, was one of the first widely-successful "single strip color" processes, and eventually displaced three-strip Technicolor.

Color by DeLuxe (sometimes with a space before the L) became a popular, vivid and stable process for filmed color television series from the mid 1960s, especially by 20th Century-Fox Television studios.

DeLuxe also offers "Showprints" (usually supplied to premieres in Los Angeles and New York). "Showprint" is DeLuxe's proprietary name for an "EK" (for "Eastman Kodak"), the generic name for a release print made directly from the original camera negative instead of from an internegative.

== See also ==
- Alan E. Freedman
- Deluxe Entertainment Services Group
- List of color film systems
- Metrocolor
- Sol M. Wurtzel
