= Paul Kelly (actor) =

American actor

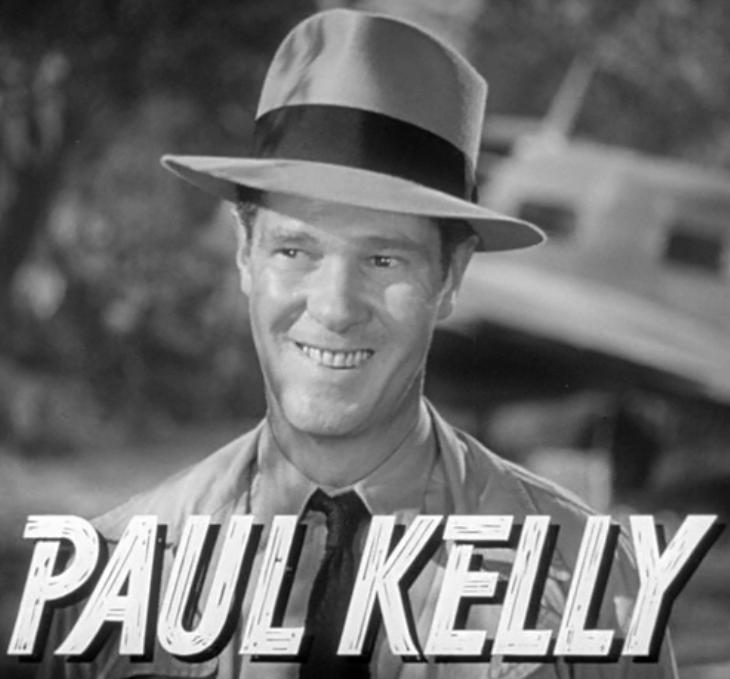
- Kelly in Tarzan's New York Adventure (1942)
- Born: Paul Michael Kelly; August 9, 1899
- Died: November 6, 1956 (aged 57); Beverly Hills, California, U.S.
- Occupation: Actor
- Years active: 1906–1956
- Spouse: Dorothy Mackaye (m. 1931; died 1940)

Paul Michael Kelly (August 9, 1899 – November 6, 1956) was an American actor. His career survived a manslaughter conviction, tied to an affair he was having with the victim's wife, that caused him to spend time in prison in the late 1920s. In the course of his career, and relatively short life, it has been estimated that Kelly worked on stage, screen, and television in over four hundred roles.

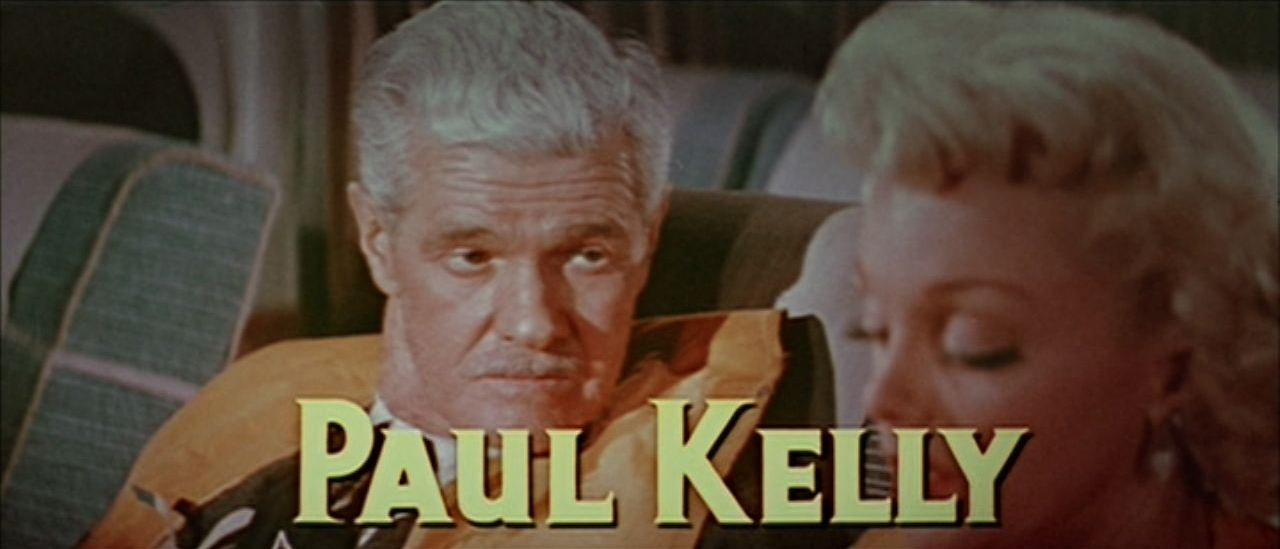
Kelly in The High and the Mighty (1954)

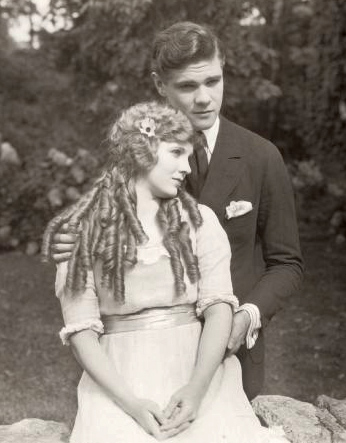
Mary Miles Minter (playing Anne Shirley) snuggles with Paul Kelly (Gilbert Blythe) in a scene still for the 1919 silent film Anne of Green Gables

Paul Kelly (1937), in Fit for a King

== Career and imprisonment ==
Kelly alternated between stage and screen as an actor. He was a handsome and popular male lead or costar in Broadway plays from the late 1910s and throughout the 1920s.

On April 16, 1927, a drunk Kelly confronted fellow actor Ray Raymond over his affair with and love for Raymond's wife, actress Dorothy Mackaye. Raymond, who was also drunk, was no match for Kelly, who was considerably larger than him. During their confrontation, Kelly hit him several times and left him on the floor.

Mackaye denied in court that she had been romantically involved with Kelly before Raymond's death, but Kelly's love letters to her were introduced as evidence. She was charged with felony conspiracy for the attempted coverup, and sentenced to one to three years, but served less than 10 months. Kelly was sentenced to up to 10 years, but served only 25 months in San Quentin prison. (Decades later, he played San Quentin Warden Clinton Duffy in the 1954 film Duffy of San Quentin.) Conditions of his release included that he must not marry for 18 months after his release, and that he would have to take a job as a clerk for $30 per week. Kelly found working as a clerk untenable, and convinced the supervisors of his parole to allow him to return to acting on Broadway, with the condition that he continued to be limited to an income of $30 per week.

Kelly made his talking film debut in 1933's Broadway Through a Keyhole. In 1948, Kelly won a Best Actor Tony Award for his role in Command Decision. Clark Gable later played the same role in the film version of the play. Kelly shared the award with Henry Fonda for Mister Roberts and Basil Rathbone for The Heiress.

== Personal life ==
Kelly and Mackaye married in 1931, shortly after the expiration on Kelly's parole condition prohibiting him from marrying. They performed on Broadway, and then returned to California, where Mackaye's daughter Valerie Raymond was apparently adopted by Kelly and became known as Mimi Kelly. Mimi would later have her own modest Broadway career.

Dorothy Mackaye's account of her experiences, Women in Prison, became a film, Ladies They Talk About (1933), with Barbara Stanwyck, and was remade as Lady Gangster in 1942.

Mackaye was in a 1940 auto crash, when her car swerved and rolled into a ditch. She walked home, and, seeking to assuage Kelly's concerns, insisted that she was not seriously hurt. Her doctor, however, insisted that she go to a hospital, where she died three days later due to a ruptured bladder she suffered in the accident.

Kelly married Claire Owen a year later. He died of a heart attack at 57 on November 6, 1956, in Beverly Hills, California.

== Filmography ==
Film
Year	Title	Role	Notes
1919	Fit to Win	Hank Simpson	
1919	Anne of Green Gables	Gilbert Blythe	
1920	Uncle Sam of Freedom Ridge	Young Sam	
1921	The Great Adventure	Another Leek Son	
1921	The Old Oaken Bucket	The Youth	
1926	The New Klondike	Bing Allen	
1927	Slide, Kelly, Slide	Dillon	
1927	Special Delivery	Tuck, another detective	(scenes deleted)
1927	The Poor Nut	Spike Hoyt	Uncredited
1932	The Girl from Calgary	Larry Boyd	
1933	Broadway Through a Keyhole	Frank Rocci	
1934	School for Girls	Garry Waltham	
1934	The Love Captive	Dr. Norman Ware	
1934	Side Streets	Tim O'Hara	
1934	Blind Date	Bill Lowry	
1934	Death on the Diamond	Jimmie Downey	
1934	The President Vanishes	Chick Moffat	
1935	When a Man's a Man	Phil Acton	
1935	Star of Midnight	Jim Kinland	
1935	Public Hero No. 1	James Duff	
1935	Speed Devils	Martin Gray	
1935	Silk Hat Kid	Tim Martin	
1935	It's a Great Life	Rockie Johnson	1935 Saga of the West Phil
1936	My Marriage	Barney Dolan	
1936	Here Comes Trouble	Duke Donovan	
1936	Song and Dance Man	Hap Farrell	
1936	The Country Beyond	Sgt. Cassidy	
1936	Women Are Trouble	Bill Blaine	
1936	Murder with Pictures	I. B. McCoogin	
1936	The Accusing Finger	Douglas Goodwin	
1937	Join the Marines	Philip H. 'Phil' Donlan	
1937	Parole Racket	Police Lieutenant Tony Roberts	
1937	It Happened Out West	Richard P. Howe	
1937	The Frame-Up	Mark MacArthur	
1937	Fit for a King	Briggs	
1937	Navy Blue and Gold	Tommy Milton (varsity coach)	
1938	Island in the Sky	Johnny Doyle	
1938	Torchy Blane in Panama	Steve McBride	
1938	The Nurse from Brooklyn	Jim Barnes	
1938	The Devil's Party	Jerry Donovan	
1938	The Missing Guest	'Scoop' Hanlon	
1938	Juvenile Court	Gary Franklin	Leading role opposite Rita Hayworth
1938	Adventure in Sahara	Jim Wilson	Starring role
1939	Within the Law	Joe Garson	
1939	The Flying Irishman	Butch Brannan	
1939	Forged Passport	Dan Frazer	
1939	6,000 Enemies	Dr. Malcolm Scott	
1939	The Roaring Twenties	Nick Brown	
1939	Invisible Stripes	Ed Kruger	
1940	Queen of the Mob	Tom Webster	
1940	Wyoming	General Custer	
1940	The Howards of Virginia	Captain Jabez Allen	Alternative title: The Tree of Liberty
1940	Girls Under 21	Johnny Cane	
1940	Flight Command	Lieutenant Commander "Dusty" Rhodes	
1941	Ziegfeld Girl	John Slayton	
1941	I'll Wait for You	Police Lieutenant 'Mac' McFarley	
1941	Parachute Battalion	Sgt. Tex McBride	
1942	Mr. and Mrs. North	Lieutenant Weigand	
1942	Call Out the Marines	Jim Blake	
1942	Not a Ladies' Man	Robert Bruce	
1942	Tarzan's New York Adventure	Jimmy Shields	
1942	Tough as They Come	Dan Stevens	
1942	The Secret Code	Dan Barton	15-chapter serial; leading role
1942	Flying Tigers	Hap Davis	
1943	The Man from Music Mountain	Victor Marsh	1943 Texas Legionaires Victor Marsh
1944	The Story of Dr. Wassell	Murdock	
1944	Dead Man's Eyes	Dr. Alan Bittaker	
1944	Faces in the Fog	Tom Elliott	
1945	Grissly's Millions	Joe Simmons	
1945	China's Little Devils	Big Butch Dooley	
1945	Allotment Wives	Major Pete Martin	
1945	San Antonio	Roy Stuart	
1946	The Glass Alibi	Max Anderson	
1946	The Cat Creeps	Ken Grady	
1946	Deadline for Murder	Lt. Jerry E. McMullen	
1946	Strange Journey	Lucky Leeds	
1947	Fear in the Night	Cliff Herlihy	
1947	Spoilers of the North	Matt Garraway	
1947	Crossfire	Mr. Tremaine	
1947	Adventure Island	Captain Donald Lochlin	
1950	The File on Thelma Jordon	Miles Scott	
1950	Guilty of Treason	Tom Kelly	
1950	The Secret Fury	District Attorney Eric Lowell	
1950	Side Street	Captain Walter Anderson	
1950	Frenchie	Pete Lambert	
1951	The Painted Hills	Jonathan Harvey	Alternative titles: Lassie's Adventures in the Goldrush, Lassie's Christmas Story
1952	Springfield Rifle	Lieutenant Colonel John Hudson	
1953	Gunsmoke	Dan Saxon	Alternative titles: A Man's Country, Roughshod
1953	Split Second	Bart Moore	
1954	Duffy of San Quentin	Warden Clinton T. Duffy	
1954	The High and the Mighty	Donald Flaherty	
1954	Johnny Dark	William H. "Scotty" Scott	
1954	The Steel Cage	Warden Clinton T. Duffy	
1955	The Square Jungle	Jim McBride	
1956	Storm Center	Judge Robert Ellerbe	
1957	Curfew Breakers	Police Lieutenant Lacey	
1957	Bailout at 43,000	Colonel Hughes	last film role
Television
Year	Title	Role	Notes
1950	The Ford Theatre Hour		1 episode
1952	Robert Montgomery Presents		1 episode
1954–1955	Fireside Theater		2 episodes
1954–1955	Schlitz Playhouse of Stars	Joe Tierney / Bunter	3 episodes
1955	Cavalcade of America		1 episode

== Bibliography ==
- John Holmstrom, The Moving Picture Boy: An International Encyclopaedia from 1895 to 1995, Norwich, Michael Russell, 1996, pp. 13–14.
