= Maxine North =

American businesswoman in Thailand (1920–2003)

- Born: Maxine Olive Guldner; September 10, 1920; Salem, Oregon, United States
- Died: October 3, 2003 (aged 83); Pattaya, Thailand
- Occupation: Businesswoman
- Known for: Introducing bottled water to Thailand

Maxine Woodfield North (née Woodfield, September 10, 1920 – October 3, 2003) was an American businesswoman who lived and worked in Thailand. She arrived in the country in 1950 with her husband Robert G. North, a screenwriter and reported CIA agent. Noted most for introducing bottled water to Thailand with her Polaris brand, her other businesses included carbon dioxide producer Pure Gas, consultant firm Rak, Fairbarns and North, and Thai Celadon, a company that helped revive and popularize celadon ceramics in Chiang Mai.

== Early life and career ==
North was born Maxine Olive Guldner on September 10, 1920, in Salem, Oregon, but grew up using the family name Woodfield, after her stepfather, who was a telephone line foreman. She graduated from Salem High School in 1938 and attended a secretarial school in her hometown. (Note: A 1962 article says she received a degree in business administration from the University of Oregon.) She worked at the Ladd and Bush Branch of the United States National Bank of Portland before moving to Washington, D.C. in 1941, where she performed censorship work as chief clerk in the Information Control Branch of the Department of War. She later moved to California, where she worked as an executive secretary for Columbia Pictures in Hollywood. There, she met her future husband, Robert G. North, who was a screenwriter working on the 1948 film The Sign of the Ram. They married in 1949.

In 1950, the couple moved to Thailand, where Robert co-founded the Far East Film Company. (Later sources from the 2000s would identify him as a CIA agent and describe the company as a cover for CIA operations in the country.) Maxine learned the Thai language, and co-founded Pure Gas Co., Ltd. to supply carbon dioxide to soft drink manufacturers, who previously had to import the gas from Germany. She had no background in industry, but became interested in the prospect at the suggestion of a friend and secured funds in part from the Thai government, which held 28.57 percent of shares. However, the marriage was cut short when Robert died suddenly of polio in 1954, after which Maxine returned to the United States.

== Businesses ==
North initially planned not to go back to Thailand, but after a few months went for an intended temporary stay to help with her company's succession. She ultimately settled in the country permanently. In 1956, she and her Pure Gas business partner Rak Panyarachun founded North Star, the country's first bottled water manufacturer. Its Polaris drinking water would grow over the following decades to dominate the country's market, and the company would become one of the largest producers in Asia. North had also established a radio station—the first English-language station in Thailand—but it was destroyed in a fire before the end of the decade.

In 1958, North and Rak partnered with Peter W. D. Fairbarns to establish Rak, Fairbarns and North Co., Ltd., a consulting firm that later expanded to investment counseling and import facilitation. And in 1960, the two took over a struggling pottery factory in Chiang Mai and established the Thai Celadon Company to develop and market its celadon ceramics, which became a success in the export market.

With Pattaya's emergence as a tourist destination, North took part in the development of Nipa Lodge, the first hotel in the city, which opened in 1964. She had also helped found the American Chamber of Commerce in Thailand, and the Bangkok Stock Exchange Co. (Thailand's first stock exchange, before the Stock Exchange of Thailand) in 1962.

== Personal and later life ==
North was known as a glamorous figure in Bangkok's expatriate social scene, and regularly frequented the Foreign Correspondents' Club of Thailand in the 1970s and 1980s. She was friends with US President Richard Nixon—whom she and Robert campaigned for in the 1950 California Senate election and with whom she maintained written correspondence during his vice presidency—as well as Jim Thompson, the former secret agent who popularized Thai silk; following Thompson's mysterious disappearance in 1967, she became a prominent believer in some of the conspiracy theories surrounding the case.

North, whom a 1957 interview described as "a nonsmoker, nondrinker, nonmeat-eater, nonbread-eater", regularly meditated and practiced yoga (following teachings of the Self-Realization Fellowship); her spiritual beliefs came following her husband's death. During her career, she lived in a villa in the same compound as North Star's factory in Nonthaburi Province, together with her mother-in-law, who had also been with the couple in the country before Robert's death. In her retirement, having stepped back from active business roles in 1985, she relocated to Pattaya, living next door to her friend Vera Cykman (owner of Star of Siam, a leading tailor of Thai silk).

North died on October 3, 2003, following a protracted illness. She is buried in the cemetery of the St. Nikolaus Catholic Church in Pattaya. The North Star Library in the city, initially stocked with her and Cykman's personal collections, is dedicated to their memories.
