= Larry J. Blake =

American actor (1914–1982)

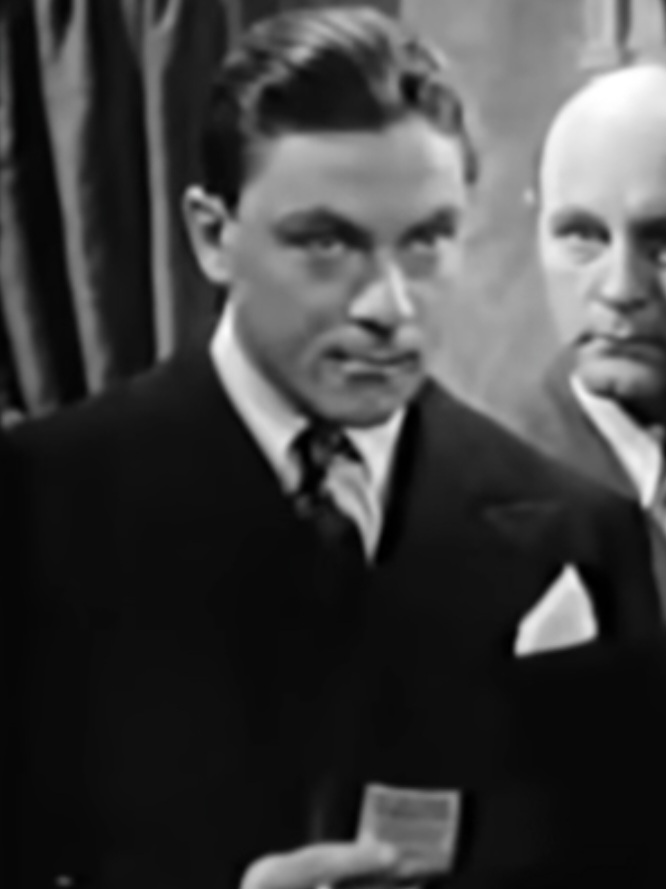
- Blake in Young Fugitives (1938)
- Born: April 24, 1914; Bay Ridge, Brooklyn, U.S.
- Died: May 25, 1982 (aged 68)
- Resting place: San Fernando Mission Cemetery
- Occupation: Actor
- Years active: 1937–1979
- Spouse: Teresa (m. 1936)
- Children: 1

Larry J. Blake (April 24, 1914 – May 25, 1982) was an American actor.

== Career ==
A native of Bay Ridge, Brooklyn, New York, he started his career in vaudeville as an impersonator, working his way to a headliner. After appearing at the Roxy Theatre and the Rainbow Room in New York City, he was offered a screen test with Universal Pictures.

Signing in 1936, he first appeared in the serial Secret Agent X-9 (1937). He later appeared in The Road Back (1937), Trouble at Midnight (1938), Air Devils (1938), The Nurse From Brooklyn (1938), State Police (1938), and The Jury's Secret (1938).

Serving in the U.S. Navy during WWII, his alcoholism almost got him dishonorably discharged. At the end of the war, he was sent to a California military hospital where a Jesuit priest introduced him to Alcoholics Anonymous.

In 1947, Blake started the first Motion Picture AA group. For the next 35 years, he helped many inside and outside the film industry gain sobriety.

Blake was part of an effort to bring vaudeville back in Los Angeles.

Over the next 33 years he appeared in numerous films, including Sunset Boulevard, High Noon, Seven Brides For Seven Brothers, Portrait of a Mobster, The Shaggy Dog, Herbie Rides Again, and Time After Time (his last film appearance).

Television credits included guest starring in James Arness's TV Western Series Gunsmoke (as a conspirator named “Dolph” in the 1956 episode “Hack Prine” (S1E26), again as “Budge Carter” in the 1959 episode “There Never Was A Horse (S3E35) & twice in 1964; once as “Shell” in “The Promoter (S9E30) and again as “Man” in “Help Me Kitty” (S10E7), Straightaway, Here's Lucy, Adam-12, Have Gun – Will Travel, Perry Mason, The Waltons, Little House on the Prairie, The Jerry Lewis Show, and Night Gallery. He was a regular on the Pride of the Family series (1953–54) and had a recurring role as the Jailer in Yancy Derringer (1958–59). In 1958 Blake appeared as the Posse Leader in the TV western Tales of Wells Fargo in the episode titled "Butch Cassidy."

== Death ==
He died on May 25, 1982, and is interred at San Fernando Mission Cemetery. His wife, Teresa, whom he married in 1936, died in 2005. His only child, Michael, worked as a child actor before becoming a film/TV Makeup artist.

== Filmography ==
- Secret Agent X-9 (1937) – Chief FBI Agent Wheeler
- The Road Back (1937) – Weil
- Trouble at Midnight (1937) – Tony Michaels
- The Jury's Secret (1938) – Bill Sheldon
- State Police (1938) – Trigger Magee
- The Nurse from Brooklyn (1938) – Larry Craine
- Air Devils (1938) – John P. 'Horseshoe' Donovan
- Sinners in Paradise (1938) – Thomas Sydney in Photographs (uncredited)
- Young Fugitives (1938) – Silent Sam
- They Made Her a Spy (1939) – Ben Dawson
- Sudden Money (1939) – Interviewer (uncredited)
- Two Thoroughbreds (1939) – Truck Driver (uncredited)
- The Boys from Syracuse (1940) – Announcer
- Maisie Goes to Reno (1944) – Policeman (uncredited)
- Behind Green Lights (1946) – Morgue Ambulance Driver (uncredited)
- The Undercover Woman (1946) – Simon Gillette
- Deadline for Murder (1946) – Hudson (uncredited)
- Strange Journey (1946) – Karl
- Magnificent Doll (1946) – Charles (uncredited)
- The Trap (1946) – Rick Daniels
- The Beginning or the End (1947) – Tough Military Policeman (uncredited)
- Smash-Up, the Story of a Woman (1947) – Radio Station Emcee (uncredited)
- Backlash (1947) – Det. Lt. Jerry McMullen
- Second Chance (1947) – Det. Sgt. Sharpe
- Call Northside 777 (1948) – Police Photographic Technician (uncredited)
- The Hunted (1948) – Hollis Smith
- French Leave (1948) – Schultyz
- Force of Evil (1948) – Detective (uncredited)
- The Lucky Stiff (1949) – Louie Perez
- Flamingo Road (1949) – Martin (uncredited)
- Holiday Affair (1949) – Plainclothesman
- The Blonde Bandit (1950) – Capt. Ed Roberts
- Destination Big House (1950) – Pete Weiss
- Kiss Tomorrow Goodbye (1950) – Telephone voice (uncredited)
- Sunset Boulevard (1950) – 1st Finance Man
- One Too Many (1950) – Walt Williams
- In Old Amarillo (1951) – Stan Benson (uncredited)
- Inside the Walls of Folsom Prison (1951) – Tim Castle (uncredited)
- Secrets of Beauty (1951) – Uncle Marty
- Iron Man (1951) – Ralph Crowley (uncredited)
- Rhubarb (1951) – Police Radio Voice (voice, uncredited)
- The Marrying Kind (1952) – Benny (uncredited)
- The Winning Team (1952) – Detective Blake (uncredited)
- High Noon (1952) – Gillis; saloon owner (uncredited)
- The Story of Will Rogers (1952) – House Detective (uncredited)
- Stop, You're Killing Me (1952) – Police Captain (uncredited)
- Angel Face (1953) – Detective Lt. Ed Brady (uncredited)
- Never Wave at a WAC (1953) – Mr. Devlin (uncredited)
- The Blue Gardenia (1953) – Music Shop Clerk (uncredited)
- The System (1953) – Detective Conducting Line-Up (uncredited)
- Remains to Be Seen (1953) – Detective Minetti
- Cruisin' Down the River (1953) – Dave Singer
- Devil's Canyon (1953) – Hysterical Prisoner (uncredited)
- Champ for a Day (1953) – Gambler (uncredited)
- City of Bad Men (1953) – Ticket Seller (uncredited)
- The Adventures of Superman (1953) - thug, unnamed
- The Great Diamond Robbery (1954) – Policeman (uncredited)
- Seven Brides for Seven Brothers (1954) – Drunk (uncredited)
- Dial Red O (1955) – Wayne; waiter (uncredited)
- Son of Sinbad (1955) – Samit (uncredited)
- Creature with the Atom Brain (1955) – Reporter #2
- The Twinkle in God's Eye (1955) – Deputy (uncredited)
- Teen-Age Crime Wave (1955) – State Police Sgt. Connors
- I Died a Thousand Times (1955) – Healy (uncredited)
- I'll Cry Tomorrow (1955) – AA Member (uncredited)
- Inside Detroit (1956) – Max Harkness
- While the City Sleeps (1956) – Tim, the Police Desk Sergeant
- The Werewolf (1956) – Hank Durgis
- Earth vs. the Flying Saucers (1956) – Motorcycle Cop
- The Man Is Armed (1956) – Ray Perkins
- You Can't Run Away from It (1956) – Detective
- Rumble on the Docks (1956) – Officer Fitz
- Badlands of Montana (1957) – First Outlaw (uncredited)
- Beau James (1957) – Reporter (uncredited)
- Beginning of the End (1957) – Illinois Highway Patrolman
- Jeanne Eagels (1957) – Reporter (uncredited)
- Band of Angels (1957) – Auctioneer (uncredited)
- Man of a Thousand Faces (1957) – David T. Stone (uncredited)
- Escape from San Quentin (1957) – Mack
- Outcasts of the City (1958)
- Too Much, Too Soon (1958) – Reporter (uncredited)
- City of Fear (1959) – Police Sergeant (uncredited)
- The Shaggy Dog (1959) – Police Officer Ed Mercer (uncredited)
- Who Was That Lady? (1960) – Tenant (uncredited)
- Elmer Gantry (1960) – Mac; bartender (uncredited)
- Portrait of a Mobster (1961) – John Murphy
- Sex and the Single Girl (1964) – Policeman (uncredited)
- Harlow (1965) – Editor (uncredited)
- That Funny Feeling (1965) – Policeman #2
- That Darn Cat! (1965) – Police Officer (uncredited)
- The Rare Breed (1966) – Auctioneer (uncredited)
- The Swinger (1966) – Honest Hal (uncredited)
- A Covenant with Death (1967) – Houseman (uncredited)
- The Adventures of Bullwhip Griffin (1967) – Saloon Barker (uncredited)
- Eight on the Lam (1967) – Police Officer (uncredited)
- The One and Only, Genuine, Original Family Band (1968) – First Outspoken Man (uncredited)
- Hang 'Em High (1968) – Prisoner in Compound
- Where Were You When the Lights Went Out? (1968) – Salesman (uncredited)
- The Love Bug (1968) – Track Timekeeper (uncredited)
- Hook, Line & Sinker (1969) – Chief of Police (uncredited)
- Which Way to the Front? (1970) – Engineer (uncredited)
- One More Train to Rob (1971) – Barber (uncredited)
- Diamonds Are Forever (1971) – Water Balloon Game Barker-Operator (uncredited)
- The Stone Killer (1973) – Police Commissioner
- Herbie Rides Again (1974) – Police Officer
- The Strongest Man in the World (1975) – Pete
- Demon Seed (1977) – Cameron
- Time After Time (1979) – Guard (final film role)
