= Leonard Strong =

Leonard Strong may refer to:

- Leonard Strong (writer), English novelist, critic, historian, and poet
- Leonard Strong (actor), American actor
