= Duffy of San Quentin =

1954 film by Walter Doniger

- Theatrical release poster
- Directed by: Walter Doniger
- Written by: Walter Doniger; Berman Swarttz
- Based on: San Quentin Is My Home; 1950 stories in The Saturday Evening Post by Clinton T. Duffy; Dean Jennings
- Produced by: Walter Doniger; Berman Swarttz
- Starring: Louis Hayward; Joanne Dru; Paul Kelly; Maureen O'Sullivan; George Macready; Horace McMahon
- Cinematography: John Alton
- Edited by: Edward Sampson; Chester W. Schaeffer
- Music by: Paul Dunlap
- Production company: Swarttz-Doniger Productions
- Distributed by: Warner Bros. Pictures
- Release date: March 16, 1954
- Running time: 78 minutes
- Country: United States
- Language: English

Duffy of San Quentin is a 1954 American film noir crime film directed by Walter Doniger and written by Walter Doniger and Berman Swarttz. The film stars Louis Hayward, Joanne Dru, Paul Kelly, Maureen O'Sullivan, George Macready and Horace McMahon. The film was released by Warner Bros. Pictures on March 16, 1954.

== Plot ==
Clinton T. Duffy suddenly has a job few would ever want. He is the interim warden at San Quentin, given the job for 30 days after violence and corruption swept what was then the nation's largest prison facility (Kelly, who played Duffy, was actually an inmate in San Quentin in the 1920s). Duffy aims to make his few days matter, cracking down on notorious guards, wiping out a stool-pigeon network and hiring the institute's first female nurse. The reforms take hold. Duffy's 30 days would become 12 years. Based on his memoir, Duffy of San Quentin tells the story of the warden's pivotal early tenure through the prism of his interactions with volatile inmate Edward Harper.

== Cast ==
- Louis Hayward as Edward 'Romeo' Harper
- Joanne Dru as Anne Halsey
- Paul Kelly as Warden Clinton T. Duffy
- Maureen O'Sullivan as Gladys Duffy
- George Macready as John C. Winant
- Horace McMahon as Pierson
- Irving Bacon as Doc Sorin
- Joel Fluellen as Bill Lake
- Joe Turkel as Frank Roberts
- Jonathan Hale as Boyd
- Michael McHale as Pinto
- Peter Brocco as Nealy
- Marshall Bradford as Lowell
- DeForest Kelley as Eddie Lee
- Sandy Aaronson as Guard
