= Dark Heaven =

1958 film

- Theatrical release poster
- Directed by: Rattana Pestonji
- Written by: Rattana Pestonji; Suwat Woradilok
- Produced by: Suwat Woradilok
- Starring: Sutape Wongkamheng; Seubneung Kanpai
- Cinematography: Prasat Sukhum
- Edited by: Tae Kanchala
- Music by: Preecha Maetrai
- Distributed by: Kachara Film; Thai Film Foundation
- Release date: 16 January 1958
- Running time: 102 minutes
- Country: Thailand
- Language: Thai

Dark Heaven (Thai: สวรรค์มืด or Sawan mued) is a 1958 musical-comedy-romance-drama film directed by Rattana Pestonji and written by Suwat Woradilok.

== Plot ==
A poor orphan girl, Nien, is on the run after stealing some food that a wealthy man had purchased to feed some dogs. She takes refuge with a singing garbage collector named Choo, who hides Nien in his garbage cart while the wealthy man and a policeman search for the girl.

Choo then takes Nien back to his humble shack and gives her shelter. The pair fall in love, but their romance is cut short when he is drafted into the army and sent off to war. For a time, Nien takes over Choo's job as garbage collector, until she is adopted by a wealthy woman, who treats Nien as the daughter she never had.

Choo comes back from the war, blinded by an explosion, Nien, while experiencing unimagined luxuries, is tortured by the conflict between her newfound wealthy lifestyle and her simple life with Choo.

== Cast ==
- Sutape Wongkamheng
- Seubneung Kanpai
- Pensri Poomchoosri
- Adisak Sawatnan
- Chalee Intharawijit
- Prasitisak Singhala
- Brandon Archbald
- Poonsawat Teemakorn
- NellyNut

== Production ==
Dark Heaven was Rattana Pestonji’s first color film. It was produced for Kachara Film company, and shot at Rattana's own Hanuman Film studios. Written and produced by Suwat Woradilok, the story had previously been made into a television drama.

At least three of the people involved with the production went to be named Thailand National Artists: The husband-and-wife team of producer-screenwriter Suwat and singer-actress Pensri Poomchoosri, as well as Chalee Intharawijit.

The film was screened as part of a retrospective to Rattana at the 2005 Pusan International Film Festival. The Thai Film Foundation released the film on DVD, with English subtitles, in 2007.
