= HaadThip =

HaadThip Public Company Limited
- Company type: PLC
- Traded as: SET: HTC
- Industry: Food and beverage
- Predecessor: NakhonThip Company Limited (1969; 57 years ago)
- Founded: HaadThip Public Company Limited (June 16, 1994; 31 years ago)
- Headquarters: Ramkhamhaeng Road, Wang Thonglang district, Bangkok, Thailand
- Area served: 14 provinces in Southern Thailand
- Website: www.haadthip.com

HaadThip Public Company Limited (Thai: บริษัท หาดทิพย์ จำกัด (มหาชน); SET: HTC) is a company that operates a soft drink manufacturing and distribution business under the name of Coca-Cola, which has been licensed from The Coca-Cola Company and other related products in 14 provinces in Southern Thailand. The company was registered as a public company on June 16, 1994.

== History ==
In 1969, Police General Luang Chattrakankoson received the license to manufacture and distribute soft drinks under the Coca-Cola name. He established NakhonThip Company Limited for this purpose. In the beginning, distribution began in 3 provinces: Songkhla, Satun and Yala. The first factory was located in Hat Yai district, Songkhla province. However, the business faced challenging economic conditions in its early stages, hindering its success.

Later in 1974, ThaiThana Company Limited of Lieutenant Pairoj Rattakul came to manage and increase the capital and invited Her Royal Highness Princess Sudasiri Sobha to be the chairman of the board. She held this position until her death. The company's executive chairman was changed to General Charan Kullavanich, who has been the company's chairman since May 25, 1998.

Later on October 3, 1978, NakhonThip and ThaiThana had agreed to jointly establish a new company, HaadThip Co., Ltd., acquiring the rights to manufacture and distribute soft drinks under the Coca-Cola brand in 11 additional provincess, thereby making the company the sole manufacturer and distributor of Coca-Cola products in the entire southern region of Thailand. It began trading on the Stock Exchange of Thailand on December 22, 1988, and became a public company on June 16, 1994.

== See also ==
- ThaiNamthip
