= ThaiNamthip =

Thai soft drink company

- Type: PLC
- Industry: Food and Beverage
- Founded: 1959 (67 years)
- Headquarters: 214 Moo 5, Vibhavadi Rangsit Road, Thung Song Hong subdistrict, Lak Si District, Bangkok 10210
- Website: http://www.thainamthip.co.th/

ThaiNamthip Corporation Public Company Limited (Thai: บริษัท ไทยน้ำทิพย์ คอร์ปอเรชั่น จำกัด (มหาชน)) it is a Thai company that operates a soft drink manufacturing and distribution business under the name of Coca-Cola, which has received the license from The Coca-Cola Company and other related products in Thailand (except for the 14 provinces in Southern Thailand where HaadThip Public Company Limited is the manufacturer and distributor).

== History ==
Coca-Cola was first introduced in Thailand on March 29, 1949, by Thai businessman Major Rak Panyarachun, the son-in-law of Field marshal Plaek Phibunsongkhram and the eldest brother of Anand Panyarachun, both former Prime Ministers of Thailand and foreign partners Bill Davis and Ray Derrick. The "Rak Derrick & Davis Bottling" bottling plant was officially opened for production and distribution on April 8, 1949. Later, due to the intense competition in trade, which involved political situations, Rak decided to sell the copyright to ThaiNamthip Co., Ltd. It was founded by three main families: the Sarasin family (Pote Sarasin), the Kiangsiri family (Chaweng Kiangsiri) and the Boonsung family (Juti Boonsung) in cooperation with Coca-Cola Export Corporation opens Thailand's first bottling company, appointing Pote as chairman.

In 1967, Coca-Cola beverage was a sponsor of the 4th SEAP Games at Bangkok, and was honored to have the letters transformed into the Coca-Cola trademark. In the same year, the Khon Kaen factory was opened, which is considered the company's first provincial factory.

In 1969, the company moved its factory and head office to Huamark Factory to support the business expansion at that time (at present, Huamark Factory is only an office).

In 1977, a manufacturing plant was opened in Lampang province to produce and distribute in the northern region. It is located on an area of 54 rai with a production capacity of 100–150 million liters per year.

In 1981, the company moved its factory from its original location in Huamark to Pathum Thani province, becoming one of the first factories in Thailand to use the "anaerobic" wastewater treatment system, supporting production in the central region.

In 1986, the company became the first beverage manufacturer in the country to launch canned products in Thailand.

In 1996, the company opened a factory in Rangsit as the main factory for production and distribution in areas nationwide. It is located on an area of 205 rai before moving the head office to the current location (Head Office, Vibhavadi Rangsit Road).

In 2004, His Majesty King Bhumibol Adulyadej the Great bestowed the Garuda Emblem, which was the highest honor for the company.

In 2007, the company changed its English name from Thai Pure Drinks Limited to ThaiNamthip Limited. At the same time, the ThaiNamthip Foundation was established to help and relieve the suffering of ThaiNamthip employees.

In 2022, ThaiNamthip Co., Ltd. changed its name to ThaiNamthip Corporation Co., Ltd.

On March 3, 2025, the company was registered as a public limited company and changed its English name from ThaiNamthip Corporation Limited to ThaiNamthip Corporation Public Company Limited and is preparing to be listed on the Stock Exchange of Thailand.

== See also ==
- HaadThip
