= Sugar Is Not Sweet =

- The Thai film poster.
- Directed by: Rattana Pestonji
- Written by: Rattana Pestonji; Roy Rithiron
- Produced by: Rattana Pestonji
- Starring: Sombat Metanee; Metta Rungrattana; Saneh Komarachun; Preeya Rungreuang; Sompong Pongmit; Sarinthip Siriwan; Ruj Ronnapop
- Cinematography: Sunt Pestonji
- Edited by: Rattana Pestonji
- Music by: Preecha Mettrai
- Production company: Hanuman Film
- Release date: 30 October 1965
- Running time: 138 minutes
- Country: Thailand
- Language: Thai

Sugar Is Not Sweet (Thai: น้ำตาลไม่หวาน or Namtarn mai warn) is a 1965 Thai romantic comedy film written and directed by Rattana Pestonji. It was the director's final feature film. The film was featured in a retrospective program to the director at the 2005 Pusan International Film Festival.

== Plot ==
Chaokun Charoenkesa, the owner of a shop that sells hair-loss treatments, wants to pay back his debt of kindness to a friend, whose formula is responsible for the Chaokun's prosperity. So he arranges for his good-for-nothing son, Manas, to marry Sugar, the daughter of his dear friend.

== Cameo ==
Rattana Pestonji has a cameo appearance in this film as the doctor who treats Chaokun in his moment of death.
