= Santi-Vina =

- Cannes Classics poster
- สันติ-วีณา
- Directed by: Khru Marut
- Written by: Robert G. North; Khru Marut; Vijit Kunavudhi
- Produced by: Robert G. North; Ratana Pestonji; Rak Panyarachun
- Starring: Poonpan Rangkhavorn; Rayvadi Sriwilai
- Cinematography: R. D. Pestonji
- Edited by: Rattana Pestonji
- Music by: Nath Thavorabutr
- Distributed by: Far East Film; Hanuman Film
- Release date: 30 December 1954
- Running time: 114 minutes
- Country: Thailand
- Language: Thai

Santi-Vina (Thai: สันติ-วีณา) is a 1954 Thai Bildungsroman film directed by Khru Marut. It was produced by Ratana Pestonji and Robert G. North, with American sponsorship, and won major awards at the Asia Pacific Film Festival in Tokyo. Widely regarded as a classic, it was the first Thai film to be shot in 35-mm color, but was considered lost until its rediscovery in 2014 and subsequent restoration.

== Plot ==
The story revolves around a poor blind child named Santi, and his friend Vina, who protects him from neighborhood bullies, led by Krai. Santi's father send him away to reside with a Buddhist monastery, but Vina remains with him. Later on in adulthood, the two become a couple. They must fend off the forceful advances of Krai, who wishes to wed Vina, and has won the endorsement of her parents.

== Production ==
Santi-Vina was produced by Thai filmmaker Ratana Pestonji and American Robert North through the Thai-American venture Far East Film (under the trademark Hanuman Film). The cooperation was part of American sponsorship of Thai cinema during the Cold War, and the company was considered by some sources to be a front for CIA activities in the country (North, who had been a writer with Twentieth Century Fox, reportedly had CIA affiliations). It was the first Thai film to be shot in color in the 35-mm format, and was expected to be the first of many such cooperative projects, though North's death in 1954, coupled with the high costs involved, led the new format to fall out of favor, and subsequent productions returned to the cheaper 16-mm format, forming the 1960s' golden age of Thai cinema.

== Reception ==
The film is seen as a landmark for Thai cinema. It was the first Thai film sent to a foreign film competition: the inaugural Asia Pacific Film Festival in 1954 (then titled the Southeast Asian Film Festival). In Tokyo, it took home awards for best cinematography, art direction as well as the Golden Harvest award for best Asian cultural representation. The film was effectively lost for decades afterwards, until 2014, when it was rediscovered in the form of prints and negatives recovered at the British Film Institute, China Film Archive, and Gosfilmofond, as a result of research sponsored by the Thai Film Archive. After two years of restoration work, it was screened at the 2016 Cannes Film Festival, and was later re-introduced to the Thai public at the Scala, followed by a limited Thai release.
