= Country Hotel =

- DVD cover
- Directed by: Rattana Pestonji
- Written by: Rattana Pestonji
- Produced by: Rattana Pestonji
- Starring: Prachuap Lukgamdi; Chana Sriubon; Sarinthip Siriwan
- Cinematography: Prasart Sukhum
- Edited by: Rattana Pestonji
- Music by: Preecha Mettrai
- Production company: Hanuman Film
- Distributed by: Thai Film Foundation
- Release date: 21 September 1957
- Running time: 138 minutes
- Country: Thailand
- Language: Thai

Country Hotel (Thai: โรงแรมนรก; RTGS: Rong Raem Narok; literally "Hell Hotel") is a 1957 comedy-drama film written and directed by Rattana Pestonji.

== Plot ==
Noi runs a rural bar and guesthouse called the Paradise Hotel. He tends bar and arm wrestles any challengers. The hotel, which has only one room, already has a guest, a man named Chana.

Chana is annoyed that the hotel plays host to various musical groups, including a 'Professor' who sings European opera, another man who practises the trombone, a Peking opera troupe, a Filipina ballad singer, a brass band and unwanted displays of "buffalo boxing" all of which take their toll on his nerves and peace of mind.

A young woman named Riam arrives and attempts to check in, only to be told that the one room is already occupied.

The reasons for Chana's stay at the hotel are mysterious, and Riam is equally enigmatic, stating her age at 65 years old, saying she has a dozen children and is an opium trader.

Chana turns out to be the accountant of a large company, who comes to the attention of some strong-arm thugs who have their eyes on the substantial payroll delivery he is about to oversee. For some reason, both he and Riam are rather good shots, which may come in useful...

== Cast ==
- Prachuap Lukgamdi as Noi
- Sarinthip Siriwan as Riam
- Chana Sriubon as Chana
- Tat Egatat as Din
- Sutasit Satayawon as Sit
- Thanom Akharaserini

== Production ==
Country Hotel was filmed in 35 mm black-and-white, with one camera on a single set.

== Release ==
The film was produced by Rattana Pestonji's Hanuman Film studio and released in Thailand in 1957. The film was shown at the 2005 Pusan International Film Festival as part of a special program, "Remapping of Asian Auteur Cinema".

A DVD of Country Hotel, with English subtitles, was released in 2005 by the Thai Film Foundation.
