= Deluxe Media =

American entertainment provisions company

Deluxe Media Inc.
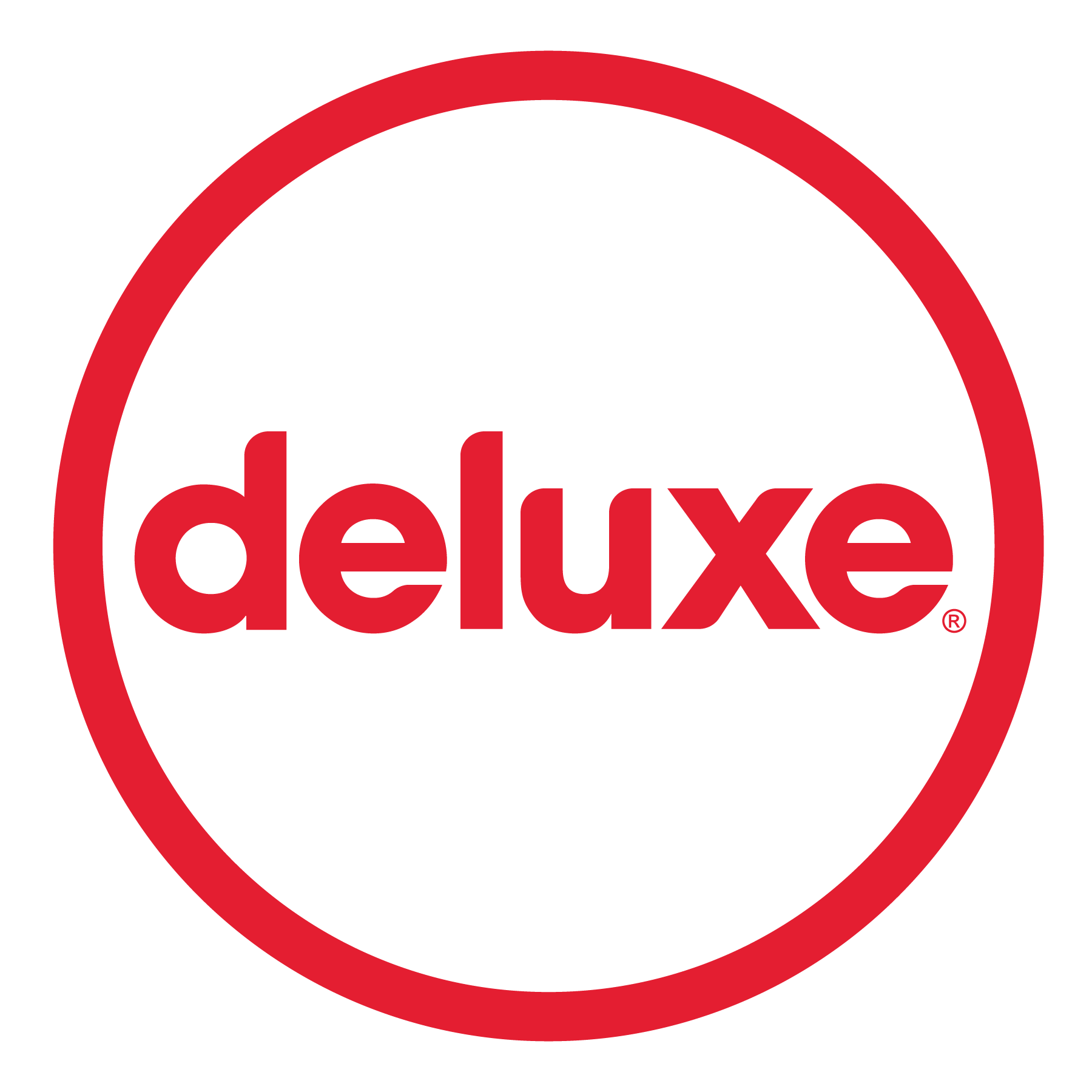
- Logo since 2016
- Type: Subsidiary
- Industry: Media; Entertainment; Digital content
- Founded: 1915; 111 years ago
- Founder: William Fox
- Headquarters: Burbank, California, United States
- Area served: Worldwide
- Key people: Cyril Drabinsky (CEO)
- Products: Film; Technology; Post production
- Services: Localization; Digital processing; Creative services
- Owner: Platinum Equity
- Number of employees: 3,500
- Website: Official website

Deluxe Media Inc., also known simply as Deluxe and formerly Deluxe Entertainment Services Group, Inc., is an American multinational multimedia and entertainment service provisions company owned by Platinum Equity, founded in 1915 by Hungarian-born American film producer William Fox and headquartered in Burbank, California.

The company services multiple clients in the film, television, digital content and advertising industries across the globe, and has been recognized with 10 Academy Awards for scientific and technical achievements, including developments in CinemaScope pictures (as part of 20th Century Fox) and more recently for a process of creating archival separations from digital image data.

== History ==
Deluxe began as a film processing laboratory established in 1915 by William Fox under the name De Luxe as part of his eponymous film conglomerate corporation in Fort Lee, New Jersey.

In 1916, Fox Film Corporation opened its studio in Hollywood on 13 acres at Sunset and Western. The first Deluxe film laboratory on the west coast was built on the south side of the lot (Fernwood and Serrano), and the laboratory was moved to the new Fox studios building on Manhattan's west side in 1919, where it remained for over 40 years. The "business manager" (later president) of the laboratory was Alan E. Freedman, who guided the company into the 1960s.

In 1927, Fox (Deluxe) received a patent for sound-on-film, the Fox Movietone system. In 1927, "Sunrise: A Song of Two Humans," an early Movietone film, opened. Fox Movietone News, ran weekly in theaters until 1963.

During the Great Depression, Fox Film Corporation encountered financial difficulties. Among the actions taken to maintain liquidity, Fox sold the laboratories in 1932 to Freedman, who renamed the operation Deluxe. Under Freedman's leadership, Deluxe added two more plants in Chicago and Toronto. In January 1934, Fox was granted an option to rebuy DeLuxe before December 31, 1938. On 31 May 1935, under Sidney Kent, Fox merged his film company with Twentieth Century Pictures to form The Twentieth Century-Fox Film Corporation following a bank-infused reorganisation. The merged company then exercised this option in July 1936, with Freedman remaining as president.

In 1953, Deluxe developed the widescreen format CinemaScope. Titles included "There's No Business Like Show Business" (1954) and "The Seven Year Itch" (1955). Other innovations included the processing and sound striping of CinemaScope, and were patented and/or received Academy awards.

In 1962 Freedman retired. In the 1960s, Deluxe closed its New York plant, followed by its plants in Chicago and Toronto, as motion picture production declined on the East Coast.

In 1972, Deluxe began large volume videocassette production, with a billion by 1996.

In 1990, The Rank Organisation acquired Deluxe from Fox.

In 2000, Deluxe began large volume DVD production.

In 2006, The Rank Organisation sold Deluxe Film Group to MacAndrews & Forbes, renamed Deluxe Entertainment Services Group.

On 9 February 2012, Deluxe acquired Hong Kong–based visual effects and post-production company, Centro Digital Pictures, with its founder John Chu remaining as president while reporting to Alaric McAusland, managing director for Deluxe in Australia.

In May 2014, Deluxe shut down its Los Angeles plant at Sunset & Western Studios complex, where other studios themselves were demolished way back in 1971. Also that same year, Deluxe closed the Hollywood film labs, and they gave thousands of orphaned film elements to the Academy Film Archive. The Deluxe Laboratories Collection at the Academy Film Archive consists of over 7,500 35mm and 16mm film elements of various motion pictures dating back to the early 1960s.

On 22 April 2015, Deluxe and its longtime competitor, Technicolor S.A., announced that they had entered into a binding agreement to create a new joint venture known as Deluxe Technicolor Digital Cinema which will specialize in cinema mastering, distribution and management services.

Deluxe got acquired on 4 September 2019 by creditors in a debt-for-equity swap to avoid bankruptcy.

On 3 October 2019, Deluxe filed for bankruptcy, pending in the Southern District of New York. The same month on the 24th, the company received court approval to emerge from bankruptcy with a comprehensive restructuring plan.

On July 1, 2020, Platinum Equity agreed to acquire the distribution division of Deluxe and re-unite with former CEO Cyril Drabinsky who would merge CineVizion, a film distribution company he founded after leaving Deluxe in 2016, into it. The companies Company 3 and Method Studios which formed the creative divisions of Deluxe were sold to Framestore in November 2020.

== See also ==
- DeLuxe Color
- Alan E. Freedman
- Sol M. Wurtzel
