= Backlash (1947 film) =

American film noir starring Jean Rogers

- Theatrical release poster
- Directed by: Eugene Forde
- Written by: Irving Elman
- Produced by: Sol M. Wurtzel
- Starring: Jean Rogers; Richard Travis; Larry Blake; John Eldredge; Leonard Strong; Robert Shayne; Louise Currie; Douglas Fowley; Sara Berner; Richard Benedict; Wynne Larke; Susan Klimist
- Cinematography: Benjamin H. Kline
- Edited by: William F. Claxton
- Music by: Darrell Calker
- Production company: Sol M. Wurtzel Productions
- Distributed by: 20th Century Fox
- Release date: March 1, 1947 (United States)
- Running time: 66 minutes
- Country: United States
- Language: English

Backlash is a 1947 American crime film noir directed by Eugene Forde. The drama features Jean Rogers, Richard Travis, Larry Blake, John Eldredge and Leonard Strong.

== Plot ==
Los Angeles police detective Jerry McMullen (Larry Blake) stops a car driven by lawyer John Morland (John Eldredge) to tell him of client Red Bailey's (Douglas Fowley) jail escape. Shortly thereafter, an armed Bailey flags down Morland's car, which police find wrecked, its driver's face beyond recognition.

McMullen breaks the news to the lawyer's wife, Catherine (Jean Rogers), who identifies a ring on the body as her husband's. She soon becomes a suspect. Morland's law partner O'Neil (Robert Shayne) believes that Catherine and district attorney Conroy (Richard Travis) have been having a secret affair, while his doctor says Morland once swallowed poison that his wife tried to give him.

Conroy is found at the Morlands' weekend getaway cabin, which is maintained by a caretaker named Willis (Leonard Strong). The evidence of an affair grows until Catherine is arrested and Conroy resigns as DA.

Bailey, meantime, resurfaces with Marian Gordon (Louise Currie), a girlfriend. McMullen has a phone tapped and follows them. He learns that Bailey was hidden by Morland at the cabin, but then they had a fight and Bailey knocked him cold.

Catherine is released. She finds O'Neil dead at the lodge. Her husband, Morland, is alive. He has been behind this all along, going so far as to fake being poisoned to frame his wife. The body in the car is the caretaker's. It is a diabolical plan, but McMullen's on the case.

== Cast ==
- Jean Rogers as Catherine Morland
- Richard Travis as Richard Conroy
- Larry Blake as Det. Lt. Jerry McMullen
- John Eldredge as John Morland
- Leonard Strong as the hobo
- Robert Shayne as James O'Neil
- Louise Currie as Marian Gordon
- Douglas Fowley as Red Bailey
- Sara Berner as Dorothy, the maid
- Richard Benedict as Det. Sgt. Tom Carey
- Wynne Larke as Patricia McMullen
- Susan Klimist as McMullen girl

Uncredited

- Billy Gray as Denny

== Reception ==
The New York Times film critic Thomas M. Pryor panned the film, writing:

When a movie company lets two of its feature pictures be sold first-run for the price of one, you can bet your last dollar that even the studio has little faith in the product. With that in mind, we can move on to a fast appraisal of Backlash and Jewels of Brandenburg, the twin bill sponsored by Twentieth Century-Fox and now showing at the Rialto. Both are melodramas and, to get the unpleasantness over with as quickly as possible, they are the type which reflect absolutely no credit upon anyone connected with them, except, possibly, the studio cutter, who pared them down to a little over sixty minutes each."
