= The Nurse from Brooklyn =

1938 film by S. Sylvan Simon

- Directed by: S. Sylvan Simon
- Starring: Sally Eilers, Paul Kelly, and Larry J. Blake
- Production company: Universal Pictures
- Release date: 1938
- Running time: 65 minutes
- Country: United States
- Language: English

The Nurse from Brooklyn is a 1938 American drama film, directed by S. Sylvan Simon for Universal Pictures. It stars Sally Eilers, Paul Kelly, and Larry J. Blake.

== Cast ==
- Sally Eilers as Elizabeth Thomas
- Paul Kelly as Jim Barnes
- Larry J. Blake as Larry Craine
- Maurice Murphy as Danny Thomas
- Morgan Conway as Inspector Donohue
- David Oliver as Detective Branch
- Lucile Gleason as 'Ma' Hutchins

== Critical reception ==
Lionel Collier, writing for the British magazine, Picturegoer, described the film as "a mixture of rough stuff and sentiment mixed with quite commendable skill." He wrote positively of the performances : "Sally Eilers doing well as a nurse who, believing that her young brother had been killed by a policeman, seeks revenge … Paul Kelly is suitably virile as the policeman and Larry Blake effectively sinister as the gangster."
