= Jewels of Brandenburg =

1947 film by Eugene Forde

- Theatrical release poster
- Directed by: Eugene Forde
- Screenplay by: Irving Cummings Jr. Robert G. North
- Story by: Irving Cummings Jr. Robert G. North
- Produced by: Sol M. Wurtzel
- Starring: Richard Travis; Micheline Cheirel; Leonard Strong; Carol Thurston; Lewis Russell; Louis Mercier
- Cinematography: Benjamin H. Kline
- Edited by: Frank Baldridge; William F. Claxton
- Music by: Darrell Calker
- Production company: 20th Century Fox
- Distributed by: 20th Century Fox
- Release date: May 27, 1947
- Running time: 64 minutes
- Country: United States
- Language: English

Jewels of Brandenburg is a 1947 American crime film directed by Eugene Forde and written by Irving Cummings Jr. and Robert G. North. The film stars Richard Travis, Micheline Cheirel, Leonard Strong, Carol Thurston, Lewis Russell and Louis Mercier. One of Sol M. Wurtzel B-pictures, the film was released on May 27, 1947, by 20th Century Fox.

== Cast ==
- Richard Travis as Johnny Vickers
- Micheline Cheirel as Claudette Grandet
- Leonard Strong as Marcel Grandet
- Carol Thurston as Carmelita Mendoza
- Lewis Russell as Roger Hamilton
- Louis Mercier as Pierre Dijon
- Fernando Alvarado as Pablo Mendoza
- Eugene Borden as Miguel Solomon
- Ralf Harolde as Koslic
