= Young Fugitives =

Film directed by John Rawlins

- Theatrical release poster
- Directed by: John Rawlins
- Screenplay by: Ben Grauman Kohn; Charles Grayson
- Story by: Edward James
- Produced by: Barney Sarecky
- Starring: Robert Wilcox; Dorothea Kent; Harry Davenport; Larry J. Blake; Clem Bevans; Mira McKinney
- Cinematography: George Robinson
- Edited by: Frank Gross
- Production company: Universal Pictures
- Distributed by: Universal Pictures
- Release date: June 30, 1938
- Running time: 67 minutes
- Country: United States
- Language: English

Young Fugitives is a 1938 American crime film directed by John Rawlins and written by Ben Grauman Kohn and Charles Grayson. The film stars Robert Wilcox, Dorothea Kent, Harry Davenport, Larry J. Blake, Clem Bevans and Mira McKinney. The film was released on June 30, 1938, by Universal Pictures.

== Plot ==
Joel Bentham is given 50,000 dollars for being the last surviving civil war veteran in his part of the country, he decides to give a house to homeless woman Meg and takes in the grandson of a war comrade Ray Riggins. Ray, along with some criminal friends, is planning to rob Joel, but has a change of heart.

== Cast ==
- Robert Wilcox as Ray Riggins
- Dorothea Kent as Meg
- Harry Davenport as Joel Bentham
- Larry J. Blake as Silent Sam
- Clem Bevans as Benjie Collins
- Mira McKinney as Letty
- Henry Roquemore as Mayor Henry Scudder
- Tom Ricketts as Tom Riggins
- Mary Treen as Kathy
- William "Billy" Benedict as Jud
