= Alan E. Freedman =

Alan E. Freedman (2nd from left) and his film processing sons (L to R) Irwin (Buck) Freedman, Hal Freedman, Myron (Mickey) Freedman in 1956

Alan Eliot Freedman (October 12, 1889 – April 29, 1980) was a pioneer and long-time executive in the motion picture film processing industry. He founded DeLuxe Laboratories after serving as president of its predecessor, Fox Film Laboratories. His career lasted over 50 years.

== Biography ==
Freedman was born in the Russian Empire in 1889. Shortly after his birth his parents brought him and several cousins to the United States, settling in New York's upper east side. He had seven younger brothers and sisters, all born in New York. Freedman retired in 1962, and died in 1980.

== Career ==
He started his long career in film processing at the industry's infancy in 1907, a time before cameras and projectors had sprockets and film had holes to match in order to assure a constant film flow, and steady exposed and projected image. Safety film, sound, and color reversal film stocks had not been conceived. And it was a time before continuous processing; when movie film was loaded on racks, batch processed in dip tanks and dried in drums.

His first industry job was with the Wendel film processing laboratory in Manhattan. He moved to Crystal Film Company in the Bronx shortly thereafter. In 1911 Fox Film Corporation (later 20th Century Fox) Executive Assistant Sol Wurtzel recruited Freedman as a bookkeeper and paymaster for its laboratory; he was soon promoted to business manager by Vice President Jack Leo, and he went on to run the lab under various titles. Freedman led the lab through the trials and shortages of World War I, overcoming a catastrophic explosion and fire and finding ways to pioneer improvements in film processing such as the addition of sound.

In the depths of the depression, Freedman bought the lab from Fox Film Corporation, renamed it “DeLuxe”. In January, 1934, Fox was granted an option to rebuy DeLuxe prior to Dec. 31, 1938. Fox exercised this option in July, 1936 with Freedman remaining as president.[documentation forthcoming] (Since Freedman's retirement, DeLuxe has been sold several times and is now known as DeLuxe Entertainment Services Group.) Under his direction, various innovations, including the processing and sound striping of Cinemascope, were developed and implemented. Many of those were patented and/or received Academy awards. During World War II, in addition to processing films from Fox and the other studios, his firm worked with the Signal Corps and the War Department to process military surveillance and training films. In appreciation, the War Department presented Freedman its patriotic services award. Similarly, the Commerce Department presented two certificates of appreciation, one in 1953 for services rendered ... in time of national emergency ... without compensation and one for his ... contribution to the defense of the United States by [his] service in the National Defense Executive Reserve. After the war, Freedman served as a UNESCO emissary to Europe to re-establish and vitalize film industries there.

Freedman had a great ability to forge low-key behind-the-scenes agreements which benefited all parties. One major accomplishment was to arrange financing for Robert Benjamin and Arthur Krim to buy United Artists in the early 1950s. This action had a side benefit for DeLuxe in that UA contracted to buy film processing services from the lab. During the 1950s and 1960s, DeLuxe negotiated with the union on behalf of all the New York Labs. Freedman worked behind the scenes while using his assistant and son Irwin (Buck) Freedman as the point man at the negotiating table. He was also chairman of the Motion Picture Laboratory Technicians, Local 702, Pension and Welfare Funds. Freedman was a pioneer member of the Society for Motion Picture Engineers. He was also a member of the Will Rogers Motion Pictures Pioneers Foundation, earning a Citation of Honor for "… dedicated and distinguished humanitarian service to the people of the entertainment industry [and] augmenting his participation in matters of the board of directors," and the Academy of Motion Pictures Arts and Sciences. He received many awards and testimonials including a lifetime achievement award from the Motion Pictures and Television Industries and recognition from the Encyclopædia Britannica Educational Corporation for outstanding contributions to the cause of audiovisual education.

== Sons’ Careers in Motion Picture Film Processing, Sales and Rejuvenation ==
Alan Freedman's three sons – Harold, Irwin (Buck), and Myron (Mickey) – all began their careers with DeLuxe.

Harold served as Engineering Assistant to the President, managed the sound department. He was instrumental in the development and implementation of numerous innovations in sound technology including the conversion from optical to magnetic processes. He in addition conceived and patented the product and technique for film splicing utilizing a sprocketed adhesive backed film, a technique that is still in use today. After DeLuxe closed its New York plant, Harold finished his career with Technicolor.

Buck served both as Assistant to the President and as president of the Toronto lab. He represented the New York labs in union contract negotiations. In the early 1960s when Fox was again running into great financial difficulties Buck kept product flowing into DeLuxe by successfully selling DeLuxe's excess capacity to most of New York's independent producers. He left DeLuxe shortly after the Zanuck takeover of Fox, and was motion picture film national sales manager for Agfa-Gevaert until his retirement.

Mickey managed DeLuxe's Chicago Crescent lab. After leaving DeLuxe, Mickey pioneered and then improved film rejuvenation. He patented and implemented new techniques which improved both quality and profitability, and he served as general manager of Hollywood Film Corp.
