= Irving Cummings Jr. =

American producer

- Born: January 27, 1918; New York, United States
- Died: March 26, 1996 (aged 78); Van Nuys, California, USA
- Occupation(s): Producer, writer
- Parent: Irving Cummings

Irving Cummings Jr. (January 27, 1918 – March 26, 1996) was an American producer and writer, known for the NBC television series Fury.

== Biography ==
Cummings was the son of actor and director Irving Cummings. They worked together several times: in 1948 they produced The Sign of the Ram together, and in 1951 he produced the film Double Dynamite, which his father directed.

He died of cancer in Van Nuys, California.

== Filmography ==
| Year | Title | Notes | Ref. |
|---|---|---|---|
| 1940 | Yesterday's Heroes | Writer | |
| 1941 | Ride, Kelly, Ride | Writer | |
| 1941 | Last of the Duanes | Writer | |
| 1942 | Lone Star Ranger | Writer | |
| 1943 | He Hired the Boss | Writer | |
| 1946 | Deadline for Murder | Writer | |
| 1946 | Dangerous Millions | Writer | |
| 1947 | Jewels of Brandenburg | Writer | |
| 1948 | The Sign of the Ram | Producer | |
| 1950 | Where Danger Lives | Producer | |
| 1951 | Double Dynamite | Producer | |
| 1952 | A Girl in Every Port | Producer | |
| 1955-1960 | Fury | Producer; 139 episodes | |
