= Leonard Strong (actor) =

American actor (1908–1980)

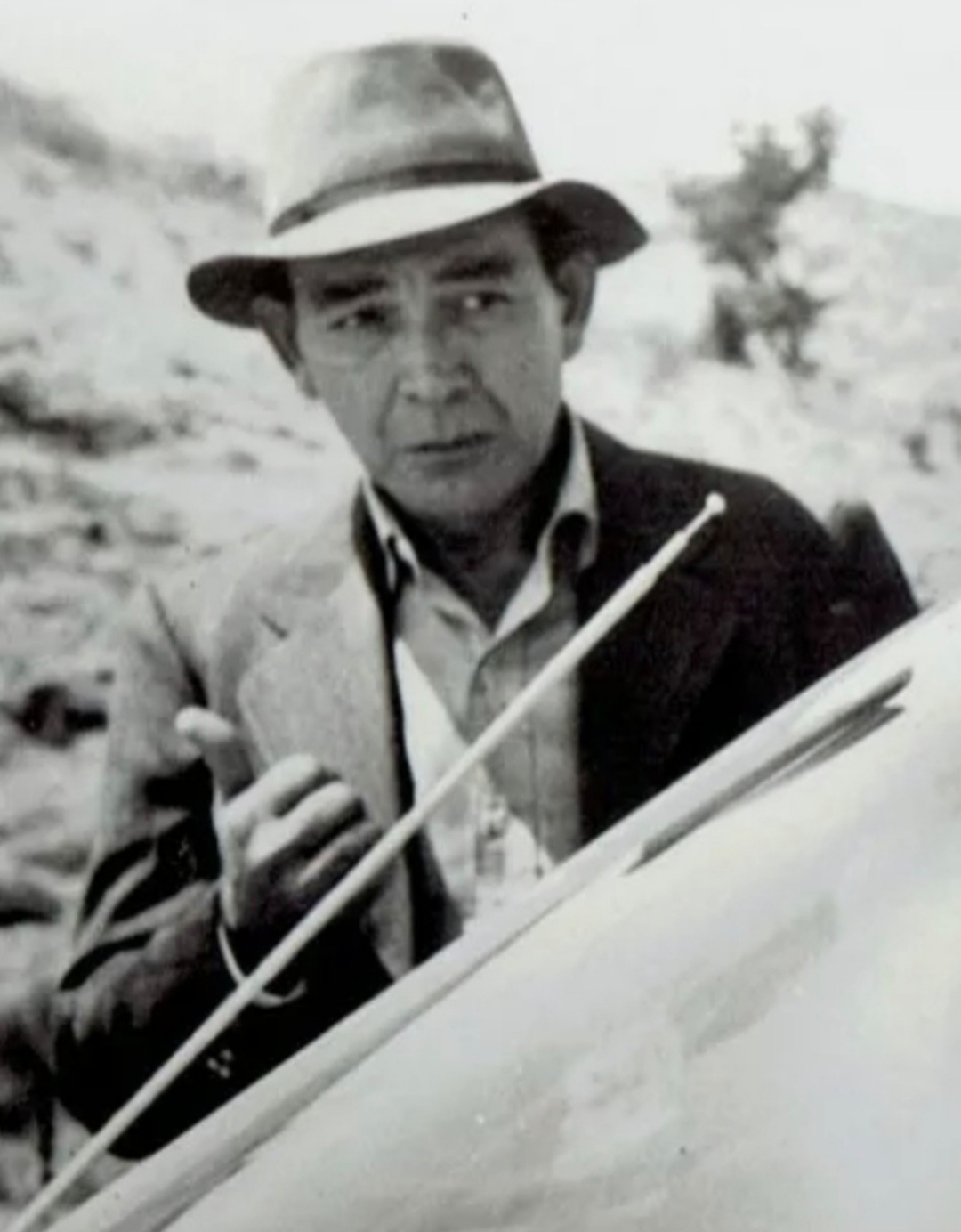
- Strong in Twilight Zone episode "The Hitch-Hiker" (1960)
- Born: Leonard Clarence Strong; August 12, 1908; Salt Lake City, Utah, U.S.
- Died: January 23, 1980 (aged 71); Glendale, California, U.S.
- Occupation: Actor
- Years active: 1942–1968
- Spouse: Irene Richards (m. 1935)
- Children: 3

Leonard Clarence Strong (August 12, 1908 – January 23, 1980) was an American character actor specializing in playing Asian roles.

== Career ==
Strong was born in Salt Lake City, Utah. Beginning with Little Tokyo, U.S.A. in 1942, he played a gamut of roles as Japanese, Chinese, Koreans, Thais, etc. in films such as Dragon Seed (1944), Up in Arms (1944), Jack London (1943), Salute to the Marines (1943), Behind the Rising Sun (1943), Night Plane from Chungking (1943), Bombardier (1943), Underground Agent (1942), and Manila Calling (1942). He played the Thai interpreter in both Anna and the King of Siam and its musical remake The King and I. He played Clem in The Lone Ranger episode (1/16) "Cannonball McKay" (1949). He appeared in the movie Shane (1953) as homesteader Ernie Wright.

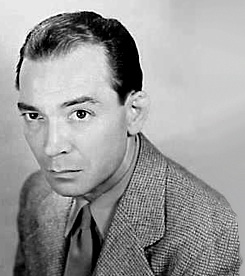
Strong, c. 1953

Strong achieved some pop culture notoriety for his role on television as "The Claw" on Get Smart, where Agent Maxwell Smart (Don Adams) is unable to understand Strong as he announces his evil nickname of “The Claw”; confused, Smart calls the villain “The Craw”, causing the bad guy to continually, and with increasing irritation, correct him. Strong appeared as "The Claw" in two episodes: "Diplomat's Daughter" (1965) and "The Amazing Harry Hoo" (1966). Additionally, he played the role of Lin Chan in "The Laser Blazer" (1968). In "The Cure" (1960), a season-five episode of Alfred Hitchcock Presents set deep in the Amazon jungle, Strong plays Luiz, a grimly faithful, deadly efficient native manservant, underestimated by all. Another notable television role was his haunting and mostly silent portrayal of the title character in the original Twilight Zone episode "The Hitch-Hiker", often listed as one of the ten best episodes of the series.

== Death ==
Strong died in Glendale, California in 1980, aged 71.

== Selected filmography ==
Year	Title	Role	Notes	Ref.
1942	Little Tokyo, U.S.A.	Fujiama		
1942	Manila Calling	Japanese Officer	Uncredited	
1942	Underground Agent	Count Akiri		
1943	Bombardier	Japanese Officer		
1943	Night Plane from Chungking	Lieutenant Karuma	Uncredited	
1943	Behind the Rising Sun	Tama's Father		
1943	Salute to the Marines	Karitu	Uncredited	
1943	Jack London	Captain Tanaka		
1944	Up in Arms	Japanese Interrogator in Cave	Uncredited	
1944	Dragon Seed	Japanese Official	Uncredited	
1944	The Keys of the Kingdom	Mr. Chia		
1945	Blood on the Sun	Hijikata		
1945	Back to Bataan	Gen. Homma		
1945	First Yank Into Tokyo	Major Nogira		
1946	Anna and the King of Siam	Interpreter	Uncredited	
1946	Dangerous Millions	Bandit Chieftain		
1947	Backlash	The Stranger / Willis - the Caretaker		
1948	Jewels of Brandenburg	Marcel Grandet		
1948	Sword of the Avenger	Ming Tang		
1949	We Were Strangers	Bombmaker	Uncredited	
1949	Malaya	Half-witted Malay	Uncredited	
1950	Backfire	Lee Quong	Uncredited	
1950	Cargo to Capetown	Singh		
1952	Carbine Williams	Robak	Uncredited	
1952	The Atomic City	Donald Clark		
1953	Destination Gobi	Wali-Akhun		
1953	Shane	Ernie Wright		
1953	Scared Stiff	Shorty		
1954	Hell's Half Acre	Ippy		
1954	The Naked Jungle	Kutina		
1954	Prisoner of War	Col. Kim Doo Yi		
1954	Bengal Brigade	Mahindra		
1955	Cult of the Cobra	Daru		
1955	Love Is a Many-Splendored Thing	Fortune Teller	Uncredited	
1956	The King and I	Interpreter	Uncredited	
1956	The Adventures of Dr. Fu Manchu	Professor Hugh Yan		
1957	This Could Be the Night	Mr. Bernbaum	Uncredited	
1958	Jet Attack	Maj. Wan (North Korean)		
1959	The Big Fisherman	Zebedee, Father of James & John	Uncredited	
1960	The Twilight Zone	the Hitchhiker	S1E10	
1962	Escape from Zahrain	Ambulance Driver		
