= Clinton Truman Duffy =

American prison warden

Clinton Truman Duffy (1898–1982) was the warden of San Quentin State Prison between 1940 and 1952. He was a prominent opponent of capital punishment.

== Life ==
His father was a guard at San Quentin, he was raised on the prison grounds, and his wife's father was also a San Quentin guard.

The 1954 film Duffy of San Quentin tells his story as a warden. His accomplishments during his tenure as warden include:

- Elimination of corporal punishment
- Improvement of food services
- Establishment of vocational training
- Founding of an Alcoholics Anonymous program
- Desegregation of the dining hall
- Creation of the first prisoner-developed radio programs inside a prison
- Inauguration of a prison newspaper

He was known to walk unarmed among the prisoners and to chat with them. Although he "supervised 90 executions during his tenure as warden", he opposed capital punishment and believed that murderers were more likely to rehabilitate than other criminals.

After he left San Quentin, he worked for the state's parole board; in addition, he wrote books and gave lectures about capital punishment. He died in Walnut Creek, California, at the age of 84.

== Works ==
- Duffy, Clinton T., and Dean Southern Jennings. The San Quentin Story. Garden City, NY: Doubleday, 1950.
- Duffy, Clinton T. 88 Men and 2 Women. Garden City, NY: Doubleday, 1962.
- Duffy, Clinton T., and Al Hirshberg. Sex and Crime. Garden City, NY: Doubleday, 1965.
- Duffy, Clinton T., and Eva Irene Linkletter. From Heroin to San Quentin. Morro Bay, CA: Java Books, 1977.
