= Deadline for Murder (film) =

1946 film directed by James Tinling

- Theatrical release poster
- Directed by: James Tinling
- Screenplay by: Irving Cummings Jr.
- Story by: Irving Cummings Jr.
- Produced by: Sol M. Wurtzel
- Starring: Paul Kelly; Kent Taylor; Sheila Ryan; Jerome Cowan; Renee Carson; Marion Martin
- Cinematography: Benjamin H. Kline
- Edited by: William F. Claxton
- Music by: Rudy Schrager
- Production company: Sol M. Wurtzel Productions
- Distributed by: 20th Century Fox
- Release date: August 1, 1946
- Running time: 65 minutes
- Country: United States
- Language: English

Deadline for Murder is a 1946 American crime film directed by James Tinling and written by Irving Cummings Jr. The film stars Paul Kelly, Kent Taylor, Sheila Ryan, Jerome Cowan, Renee Carson and Marion Martin. The film was released on August 1, 1946, by 20th Century Fox.

== Cast ==
- Paul Kelly as Lt. Jerry E. McMullen
- Kent Taylor as Steve Millard
- Sheila Ryan as Vivian Mason
- Jerome Cowan as Lynch
- Renee Carson as Zita Louise Duvalle
- Marion Martin as Laura Gibson
- Joan Blair as Helen Blanchard
- Leslie Vincent as Paul Blanchard
- Eddie Marr as Keller
- Matt McHugh as Johnny
- Jody Gilbert as Tiny
- Emory Parnell as Masseur
