= Sarah Heinz House =

Settlement house in Pittsburgh, Pennsylvania

Coordinates: 40.454795°N 79.993192°W

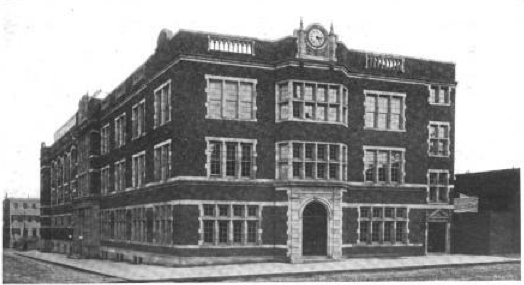
Sarah Heinz House newly built in 1915

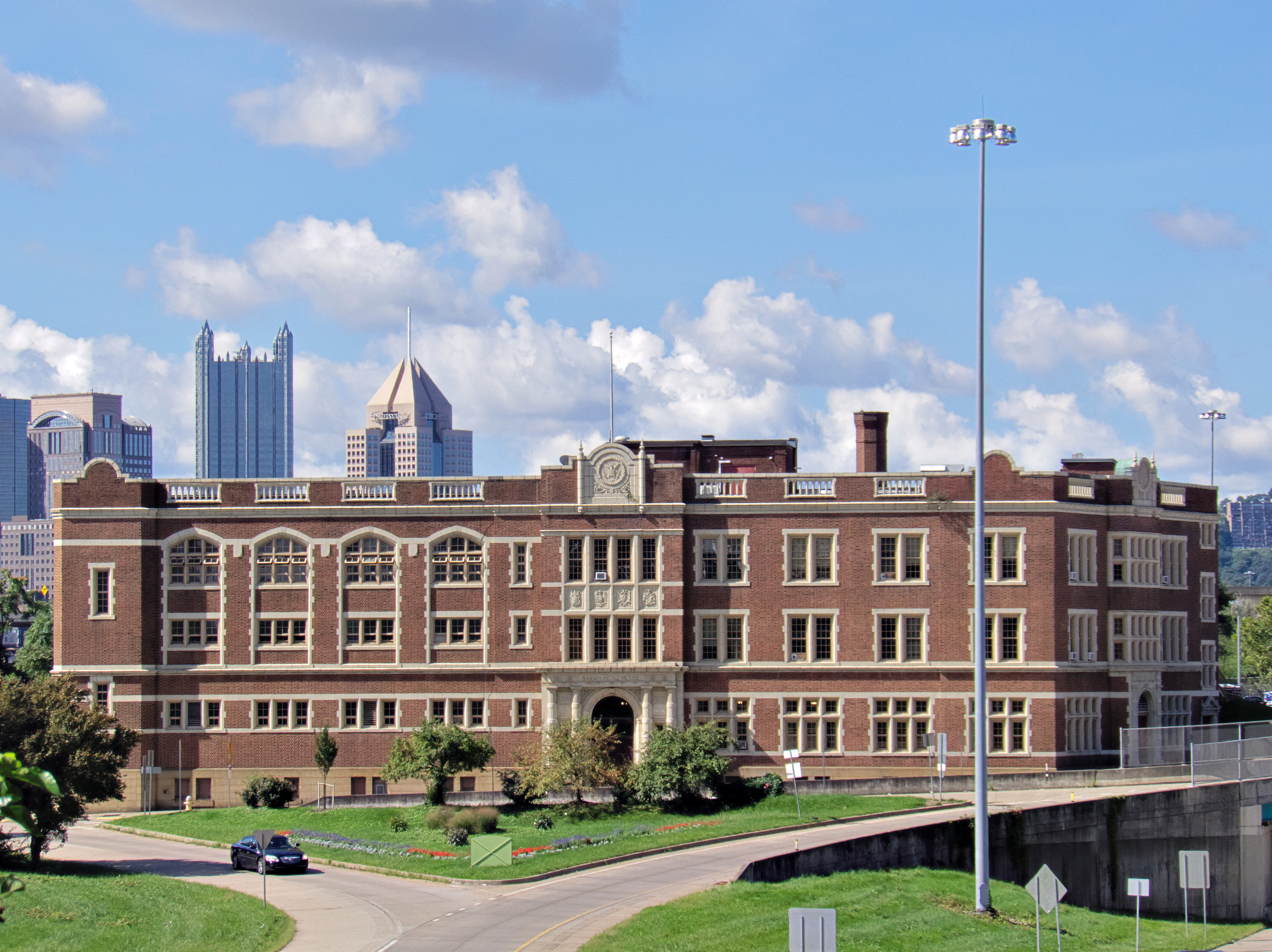
Sarah Heinz House in 2026

Sarah Heinz House (originally Covode House) is a settlement house at the corner of Heinz and Ohio streets in Pittsburgh, Pennsylvania, US. It adjoined the H. J. Heinz factories. The house's mission was: to provide wholesome social and recreational opportunities; to utilize leisure time and energy; to study individual requirements and awaken and direct latent ability; to develop Christian character and train for efficient citizenship the young people of the community; to draw together neighborhood residents and friends for mutual helpfulness: to train for service in the community.

== Establishment ==
The Sarah Heinz House was erected in 1914 by H. J. Heinz as a memorial to his wife, Sarah Young Heinz. The institution was supported and conducted entirely by members of the Heinz family. The settlement work in this connection was begun in 1901 by Howard Heinz, a son of the founder. It started as a local boys' club in a small building on Progress street nearby. The first quarters consisted of three rooms and a bathroom on the first floor of a tenement. Boys came in increasing numbers and soon the entire house was occupied, and given the name "Covode House." Two years later, the girls of the neighborhood were organized into two groups; the younger into a sewing school, and the older into an evening club. The building became too small, and another small building was secured as well as a natatorium and gymnasium. In 1914, the present building with its increased facilities was erected and formally opened on June 6, 1915. At one time, the enrollment was about 400, equally divided between boys and girls. The Settlement contained a swimming pool, billiard room, and game rooms. The fees in the Boys' Department, payable semi-annually, ranged from US$0.10 for boys under 12 to $1.50 for boys over 18.

A variety of activities were included, such as gymnastic classes, athletic competitions, basketball, swimming meets, and a training school for leaders and officers. The Girls' Department activities were largely along the lines of homemaking. There was a Saturday sewing school for young girls under fourteen, with ten classes graded according to ability. These girls had the use of the swimming pool and the gymnasium one afternoon each week. The older girls were organized into five groups, and members of all groups were eligible for classes in dress making, housekeeping, cooking, and dancing. The older girls paid a membership fee of $1.00 in two installments. A small fee was charged in addition to covering the cost of food supplies in cooking lessons. There were reception and clubrooms on the second floor for the exclusive use of girls, and a large kitchen on the third floor. There was a three-room apartment also for occasional use in the demonstration of the various housekeeping activities. The older girls had the use of the gymnasium and swimming pool one evening each week. Recreation was afforded by games, books and magazines; a victrola was also available. In the sense of doctrinal teaching, there was no distinctive religious training. The attitude of the Sarah Heinz House was that of co-operation with other agencies that work for the betterment of the people of the neighborhood. The afternoon Sunday program was an informal affair where talks were given by citizens on interesting subjects, with a musical program attached. Another feature was the course of extension lectures given by the Carnegie Institute. The City Health Department operated a permanent milk station in the building with attendant physicians and nurses who distributed the milk and gave instructions as to the care and feeding of infants to the mothers of the neighborhood. The Magee Maternity Hospital had headquarters in the building in which they conducted a maternity dispensary. Summer work was conducted on the roof garden, which was also adapted for the playing of basketball. The YMCA and the YWCA cooperated in the work of the House, and through these, many of the older boys and girls were able to enjoy camping experiences.
