= The Sign of the Ram =

1948 film by John Sturges

- Theatrical release poster
- Directed by: John Sturges
- Screenplay by: Charles Bennett
- Based on: the novel The Sign of the Ram by Margaret Ferguson
- Produced by: Irving Cummings Jr.
- Starring: Susan Peters; Alexander Knox; Phyllis Thaxter; Peggy Ann Garner
- Cinematography: Burnett Guffey
- Edited by: Aaron Stell
- Music by: Hans J. Salter
- Color process: Black and white
- Production company: Signet Productions
- Distributed by: Columbia Pictures
- Release date: March 3, 1948
- Running time: 84 minutes
- Country: United States
- Language: English

The Sign of the Ram is a 1948 American film noir directed by John Sturges and screenplay by Charles Bennett, based on a novel written by Margaret Ferguson. The drama features Susan Peters, Alexander Knox and Phyllis Thaxter. It also featured Ron Randell. The film's title alludes to people born under the astrological sign Aries (the Ram), who are supposedly strong-willed and desire to be admired, as explained in the dialogue.

The film marked Susan Peters's return to the screen after a three-year absence following an accident that permanently paralyzed her. It was her final film before her death in 1952. It was also the next to last film for Dame May Whitty.

== Plot ==
Sherida Binyon is driven by Mallory St. Aubyn to Bastions, his family estate on the western coast of England, where she is to serve as a secretary to Mallory's wife Leah. Leah is a poet who uses a wheelchair due to an accident when she rescued her step-children (by Mallory's first wife) from drowning. Mallory and the three children—Jane, Logan, and Christine—all seem devoted to Leah, perhaps out of guilt. Leah, however, manipulates the family's affections through her own condition while also flirting with her doctor. Besides the doctor, the family is frequently visited by a gossipy neighbor, Clara Brastock.

Christine and Clara both raise Leah's suspicions that Mallory and Sherida are attracted to each other, even though that is not true. Leah's grip on the family further weakens when the doctor reveals that he intends to propose to Jane, which Leah tries to prevent. Logan, a law student, also resumes a romance with Catherine Woolton, a neighboring young woman. Leah also tries to subvert that relationship by claiming that Catherine, an adoptee, came from a family afflicted by mental illness and cannot dare to pass it on to any children the couple might have. When a distraught Catherine attempts suicide but is stopped by Logan and after Christine, her mind twisted by Leah, tries to poison Sherida, Leah is left alone in the home. In one final act of control, she is able to make her way to the cliff above the ocean and throws herself off.

== Cast ==
- Susan Peters as Leah St. Aubyn
- Alexander Knox as Mallory St. Aubyn
- Phyllis Thaxter as Sherida Binyon
- Peggy Ann Garner as Christine St. Aubyn
- Ron Randell as Dr. Simon Crowdy
- Dame May Whitty as Clara Brastock
- Allene Roberts as Jane St. Aubyn
- Ross Ford as Logan St. Aubyn
- Diana Douglas as Catherine Woolton
- Gerald Hamer as Vicar Woolton
- Doris Lloyd as Mrs. Woolton
- Paul Scardon as Perowen
- Margaret Tracy as Emily
- Gerald Rogers as Station Master

== Production ==
The film is based on a 1945 novel by Margaret Ferguson, which The New York Times said it was "a book to chill the cockles of your heart." Since the story concerned a poet in a wheelchair, it was thought to be an ideal comeback vehicle for Susan Peters, who had been injured in a hunting accident near San Diego on 1 January 1945 that permanently paralysed her. Peters was under contract to MGM at the time. Her last completed film was Keep Your Powder Dry. She had an incomplete film The Outward Room which MGM wanted to reshoot to incorporate Peters' accident but she persuaded Louis B. Mayer otherwise.

Actor Charles Bickford read the novel and told Peters about it. "Leah is a completely domineering woman", said Peters. "But I know what makes her that way. It is a fear of being alone."

Peters took the project to her agent, Frank Orsatti, who got director Irving Cummings, who wanted to move into producing, involved in the project. Cummings and his son Irving Cummings Jr., and the Orsatti Agency set up an independent company, Signet to make the film. Signet signed a deal with Columbia, which provided cast and crew, production facilities and distribution. Peters received 33% of the profits. "It seemed to be much more sensible than for me to make a picture on a straight salary, what with income taxes and all", said Peters.

With Cummings as producer, the project was announced in April 1947 and John Sturges was announced as director in June. Peggy Ann Garner was borrowed from 20th Century Fox. Filming started 8 July 1947. "I know they will come in to see how I look in a wheelchair", said Peters during the shoot. "If I can send them out thinking I'm an actress I'll be satisfied. This is my great opportunity."

Seymour Friedman shot background footage in Cornwall, England.

== Reception ==
Film critic Bosley Crowther, in The New York Times, was harsh. According to Crowther: "Plainly the story is claptrap. And the direction of John Sturges is such that the illogic and the pomposity are only magnified. By showing Miss Peters, in her wheelchair, as though she were an alabaster doll, with just about as much personality, he has completely denatured her role. And by directing Phyllis Thaxter, Peggy Ann Garner, Allene Roberts and Alexander Knox to hit such a slowness of tempo and such a sombreness of tone that the whole thing drifts into monotony, he has only emphasized the static qualities. If it weren't for the noisy interjection of thunder-drums and pounding surf from time to time, this would be an effective soporofic. And it might have been kinder to let it be."

The film was not a box office success.

== Susan Peters's later career ==
In February 1948, Irving Cummings announced that Signet's next movie would be a romantic comedy, Paris Rhapsody, based on a script by Charles Bennett. It would be made in Paris the next winter. The same month Signet announced they would make The Pasadena Story.

However the film was never made and The Sign of the Ram would be Peters's last feature. She separated from her husband Richard Quine in March 1948 and made a TV series, Miss Susan (1951), and toured in two stage plays, The Glass Menagerie and The Barretts of Wimpole Street. She committed suicide in 1952.
