= Rak Panyarachun =

Thai businessman and politician (1914–2007)

Rak Panyarachun (Thai: รักษ ปันยารชุน; 3 June 1914 – 21 January 2007) was a Thai army officer, businessman and politician. He was a son-in-law of Prime Minister Plaek Phibunsongkhram (Phibun), and served as deputy minister of foreign affairs in Phibun's government from 1955 to 1957. He was also a brother of future prime minister Anand Panyarachun.

Rak graduated Doctor of Law from France and joined the Royal Thai Army in the Judge Advocate General's Department, reaching the rank of major. He left the army in 1946 to pursue private business, notably co-founding Rak, Derrick & Davis Bottling, the first Thai importer of Coca-Cola, which began selling the drink in 1949. He also partnered with Maxine North in several business ventures, including Thailand's first bottled water brand, Polaris.
