= Rattana Pestonji =

Thai film director

- รัตน์ เปสตันยี
- Pioneering Thai film director.
- Born: Rattan Pestonji; 22 May 1908; Bangkok, Siam
- Died: 17 August 1970 (aged 62); Bangkok, Thailand
- Other name: R. D. Pestonji
- Occupations: Film director; cinematographer; screenwriter
- Years active: 1939–1970
- Spouse: Chuen Thappathat (1937)
- Children: 3
- Awards: Asia Pacific Film Festival Best cinematography 1954 Santi-Vina

Rattana Pestonji (Thai: รัตน์ เปสตันยี; RTGS: Rat Pesatanyi) was a Thai film director, producer, screenwriter and cinematographer and is regarded as the father of contemporary Thai film. Although his filmography was brief, his films placed Thai cinema on the world stage. He also pushed for innovations, and was one of the first Thai directors to use 35-mm film. He died just as he was giving a speech to government officials to call for support of a domestic industry he saw as coming under threat from Hollywood films.

== Biography ==
=== Early life ===
He was born Rattan Pestonji (also sometimes referred to as R. D. Pestonji or Ratt Pestonji) in Bangkok, to an Indian Parsi family. At an early age, he showed an avid interest in photography. He was so adept at dismantling and reassembling his camera, that it was decided he should study engineering at the University of London.

He spent his early life studying in India and UK. Between studies in London, he was able to take photos and he picked up several awards in photographic competitions.

He returned to Thailand with an engineering degree, but continued to pursue his interest in photography and found a job as a film salesman. It was then he began to explore an art form that was still in its infancy – cinematography.

=== His first films ===
In 1937, Rattana shot his first film, a short called Tang, about a young Thai girl. Tang won the Amateur Cine Competition in Glasgow, Scotland and Rattana was given the top award by Alfred Hitckcock, who was president of the jury. He made another short called White Boat in 1939 and it was shown at the New York World Festival.

Rattana continued his work in film sales, but he was given his big break into filmmaking in 1949 when he was asked by Prince Bhanu Yugala to act as a cameraman on the film Phanthaay Norasingh (Oarsman Norasingh). Rattana showed great talent as a cinematographer.

Around this time, Rattana formed his own studio, Hanuman Films Company. He directed his first feature film, Dear Dolly in 1951.

=== Pushing for innovations ===
In each of his films, Rattana sought to experiment and raise the standard of production. At a time when post-dubbed 16 mm films were the industry standard in Thailand, Rattana wanted to use 35 mm stock, which was more expensive and technically difficult to work with, but it allowed for the sound to be recorded along with the image.

His first 35-mm film was the drama, Santi-Vina, on which he worked as cinematographer only. It was directed by Thavi Na Bangchang (better known as "Kru Marut") with a screenplay by Vichit Kounavudhi.

Santi-Vina was among the first Thai films to be sent to an overseas competition, the 1954 Asia Pacific Film Festival in Tokyo. It was a sensation, sweeping the awards for best cinematography, art direction and the Golden Harvest Award for best Asian cultural presentation.

Still, Rattana would run afoul of the Thai government, and upon his return from the festival, he was charged $5,000 tax for the $16,000 Mitchell Camera he won, and was fined 1,000 baht for failing to clear his film with the Thai censor.

=== Career as director ===
Undaunted, Rattana continued his work, working as cinematographer on the romantic drama Chuafah Din Salai (Dying Forever) and then taking the director's chair for Rongraem Narok.

For Rongraem Narok, (literally hotel hell, but entitled Country Hotel in English), he employed the use of one camera on a single set, similar to Hitchcock's 1948 film, Rope. The film had a bit of everything – rustic comedy, music (including a full ballad by a Filipina singer), rough-and-tumble action and dark, thrilling drama.

His first color film was 1958's Sawan Mued (Dark Heaven), which featured songs and some dramatic battlefield scenes.

Next was Prae Dum (Black Silk), which is regarded as Thailand’s first film noir (though Country Hotel had film noir elements as well). It is regarded as Rattana's best work. He performed almost all the major tasks himself, acting as writer, producer, director, cinematographer and editor. For his efforts, Prae Dum was included in competition at the 11th Berlin International Film Festival in 1961.

His final film was made in 1965, Nahmtaan Mai Waan (Sugar Is Not Sweet). A romantic farce, it is a vibrant film that takes visual cues from the pop-art style of Western films of the time. The film concerns a wealthy Thai aristocrat who owns a hair treatment business and wants to repay a debt to his dear Indian friend.

=== Death while giving a speech ===
Whilst Rattana was artistically respected, his films – featuring unhappy endings – were mostly commercial failures. Frustrated, he retired from filmmaking. However, he continued to be involved with the industry and was a tireless lobbyist. He co-founded and headed the Thai Film Producers Association.

On the night of August 17, 1970, at the Montien Hotel in Bangkok, Rattana was set to address film producers and Thai government officials in a meeting called to discuss ways of supporting the film industry. Finally, at 9 pm, after an address by Economics Minister Bunchana Atthakorn and speeches by numerous other filmmakers and officials, Rattana's time to speak came. Here is an accounting of his speech:

When I first started out in the movie business ... Sadet Ong Chai Yai [Prince Bhanu Yugala] had just hired me as a cameraman for a film he wanted to shoot called Phanthaay Norasingh. I've spent every baht I ever earned on my productions and now I have to make adverts just to survive. The foreign film distributors have been preying on Thai cinemas ...

Rattana faltered then collapsed to the floor. He was rushed to nearby Chulalongkorn Hospital, but he died three hours later of a massive coronary.

== Legacy ==
Rattana's death was the first of two tough blows for the burgeoning Thai industry in 1970, for later in the year, it would lose its biggest star, Mitr Chaibancha, in a fatal accident during the filming of a stunt.

A few days after Rattana's death, the government did set up the Thai Film Promotion Board, which would be responsible for promoting and encouraging investment in Thai films. But to this day there is still no direct government support for the Thai film industry and foreign films continue to dominate the domestic cinema landscape.

Movies made in the Thai studio system, such as Ong-Bak: Muay Thai Warrior, fare better in local cinemas, while indie directors such as Apichatpong Weerasethakul are left to seek funding from overseas backers.

Still, Rattana's legacy is recognizable. His films are cited as a major influence by Wisit Sasanatieng, a Thai film director whose acclaimed Tears of the Black Tiger (Fah Talai Jone) was shown at the Cannes Film Festival in 2000.

The studio that Rattana started, Hanuman Films Company, is still operated by his sons Edal and Santa. It is now called Santa International Film Productions and it provides technical support and equipment to foreign film productions. His son Santa Pestonji directed a remake of Santi-Vina in 1976. The original version of Santi-Vina was considered a lost film until prints were discovered in 2015. After restoration, it is set to be screened at the 2016 Cannes Film Festival.

Rattana's films are periodically shown in retrospectives at film festivals. The 10th Pusan International Film Festival screened Sugar Is Not Sweet, Black Silk, Country Hotel and Dark Heaven. He was posthumously awarded the Lifetime Achievement Award at the 2004 Bangkok International Film Festival.

The R. D. Pestonji Award, the top prize of the Thai Short Film and Video Festival, is named in his honor.

== Filmography ==
- Tang (short) (1937) – (Thai: แตง)
- White Boat (short) (1939)
- Phanthaay Norasingh (Oarman Norasingh) (cinematographer) (1949) – (Thai: พันท้ายนรสิงห์)
- Tukkata Jaa (Dear Dolly) (1951) – (Thai: ตุ๊กตาจ๋า)
- Santi-Vina (cinematographer) (1954) – (Thai: สันติ-วีณา)
- Chuafah Din Salai (Forever Yours) (cinematographer) (1955) – (Thai: ชั่วฟ้าดินสลาย)
- Rongraem Narok (Country Hotel) (1957) – (Thai: โรงแรมนรก)
- Sawan Mued (Dark Heaven) (1958) – (Thai: สวรรค์มืด)
- Phrae Dum (Black Silk) (1961) – (Thai: แพรดำ)
- Namtarn Mai Warn (Sugar Is Not Sweet) (1964) – (Thai: น้ำตาลไม่หวาน)
