= Sol M. Wurtzel =

American film producer (1890–1958)

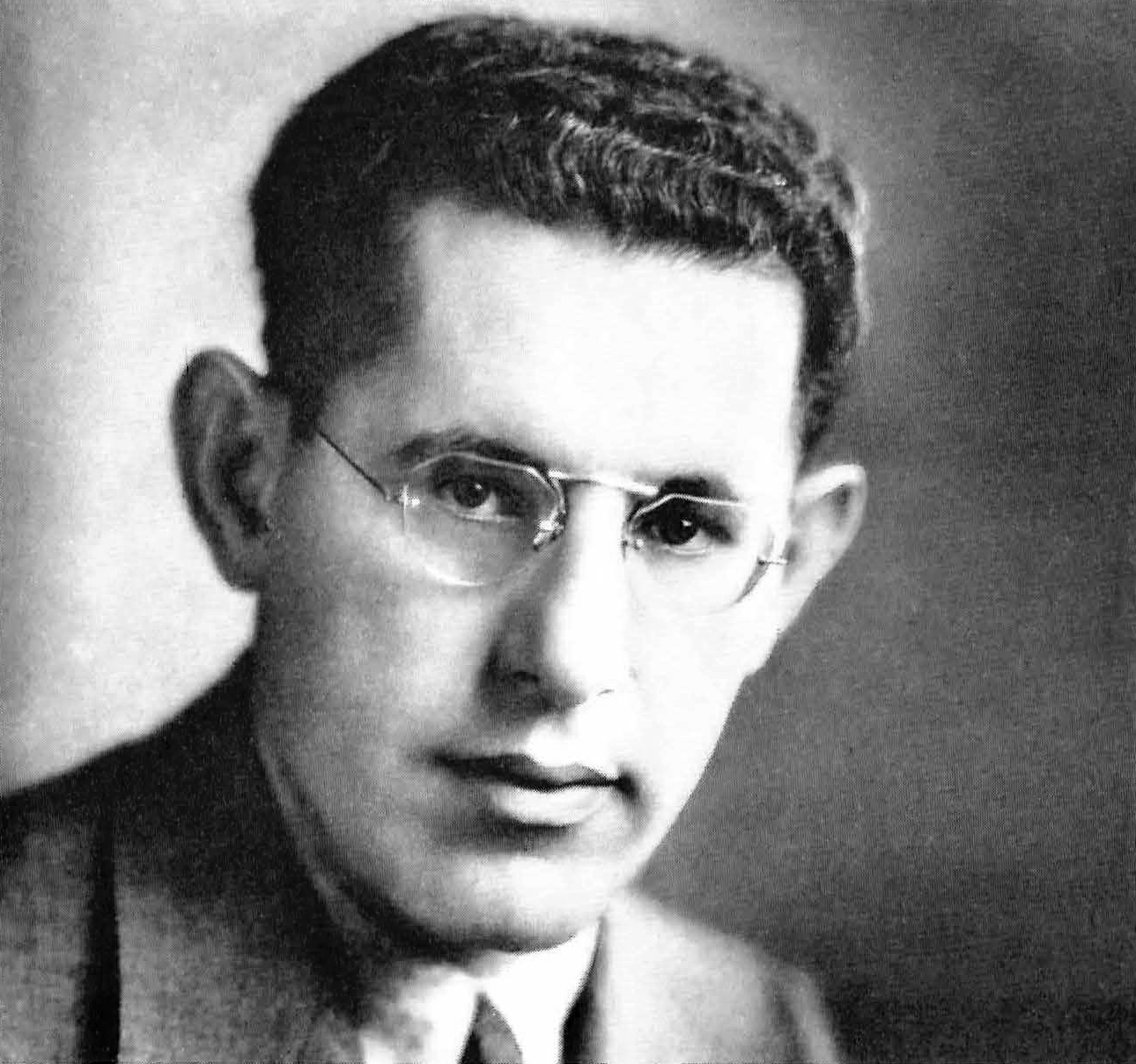
- Wurtzel in 1933
- Born: Solomon Max Wurtzel; September 12, 1890; New York City, U.S.
- Died: April 9, 1958 (aged 67); Los Angeles, California, U.S.
- Resting place: Hillside Memorial Park Cemetery in Culver City, California
- Occupation: Film producer
- Spouse: Marian Bodner (m. 1912)
- Children: 2

Solomon Max Wurtzel (September 12, 1890 – April 9, 1958) was an American film producer.

== Life and career ==
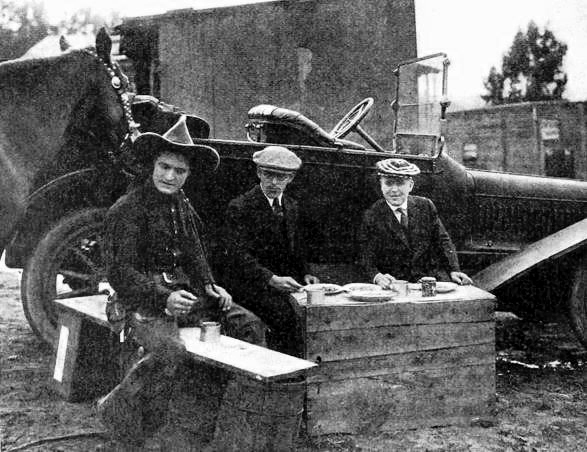
Tom Mix, actor; Sol Wurtzel, West Coast manager for Fox Film Corporation; and Winfield R. Sheehan, Fox Film general manager (1919)

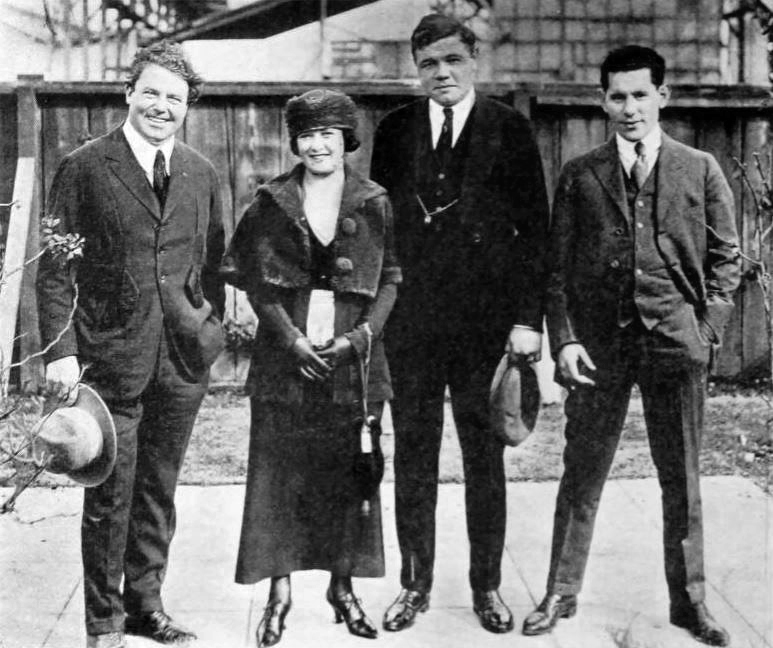
William Farnum, Helen and Babe Ruth and Wurtzel on the Fox Studios lot in Hollywood (1920)

Born in New York City, the second of five brothers; his parents were both Polish Jews from the village of Ulanow (Surname Wurtzel is a variant spelling of German and Yiddish wurzel, root in English). Wurtzel worked as an executive assistant to William Fox, founding owner of the Fox Film Corporation.

In 1911, Wurtzel hired Alan E. Freedman as a bookkeeper for Fox's fledgling film processing laboratory. Freedman would remain for over 50 years, eventually turning the operation into the gargantuan "Color by DeLuxe" DeLuxe Laboratories.

In 1917, Fox sent Wurtzel to California to oversee the studio's West Coast productions. Early in Wurtzel's career, he shepherded Fox's Hollywood studio through the Spanish Flu pandemic. He developed a formula for creating consistently profitable B movies that are heralded today.

During his 34-year career at Fox and 20th Century Fox, Wurtzel supervised over 700 films (many uncredited), including a large number of the Charlie Chan, Mr. Moto, and Jones Family series, as well as other successes such as Bright Eyes in 1934, starring Shirley Temple and featuring her enduring trademark song: "On the Good Ship Lollipop".

He discovered young director John Ford, who later went on to earn 4 Academy Awards. He also discovered and made a star of famous cowboys Will Rogers and Tom Mix.

Wurtzel cast dancer Rita Hayworth (credited under her given name Rita Cansino) in her first film role, the 1935 production Dante's Inferno. He gave an unknown Marilyn Monroe her first walk-on in his 1947 production of Dangerous Years.

He produced several of Laurel and Hardy's later comedies in the 1940s, including Great Guns (1941), A-Haunting We Will Go (1942), Jitterbugs (1943) and The Big Noise (1944). In 1943, he produced Chetniks! The Fighting Guerrillas on the guerrilla resistance movement in Serbia.

== Personal life and death ==
Wurtzel married Marian Bodner, who immigrated to New York from a small Polish shtetl, in 1912. They had two children: Paul Wurtzel, who worked in his father's production company, Sol M. Wurtzel Productions, and went on to become a prolific assistant director for multiple television series, and Lillian Wurtzel Semenov, who compiled and edited a book of letters between her father and his boss, William Fox.

Wurtzel cofounded and served as the first President of Temple Israel of Hollywood.

Ill for many years following a stroke in 1953, Wurtzel died at his home in Hollywood on April 9, 1958. John Ford and Rabbi Max Nussbaum delivered eulogies at his funeral at Temple Israel of Hollywood, attended by 400 mourners. Wurtzel was interred in the Hillside Memorial Park Cemetery in Culver City, California.

The Wurtzel-Neff Estate on Bellagio Road in Bel Air, Los Angeles was designed by Wallace Neff and completed in 1932.

== Selected filmography ==
- Rustling for Cupid (1926)
- The Shamrock Handicap (1926)
- Once a Sinner (1931)
- Body and Soul (1931)
- Charlie Chan's Greatest Case (1933)
- The Man Who Dared (1933)
- Smoke Lightning (1933)
- The Last Trail (1933)
- Life in the Raw (1933)
- Walls of Gold (1933)
- Smoky (1933)
- Judge Priest (1934)
- Handy Andy (1934)
- Bright Eyes (1934)
- Charlie Chan in Paris (1935)
- Dante's Inferno (1935)
- Paddy O'Day (1936)
- Ramona (1936)
- Thank You, Jeeves! (1936)
- Gentle Julia (1936)
- Think Fast, Mr. Moto (1936)
- Thank You, Mr. Moto (1937)
- Mr. Moto Takes a Vacation (1939)
- The Man Who Wouldn't Talk (1940)
- Charlie Chan in Rio (1941)
- Dressed to Kill (1941)
- Michael Shayne, Private Detective (1941)
- A Haunting We Will Go (1942)
- The Lone Star Ranger (1942)
- Chetniks! The Fighting Guerrillas (1943)
- The Big Noise (1944)
- Backlash (1947)
- Roses Are Red (1947)
- The Invisible Wall (1947)
- Second Chance (1947)
- Half Past Midnight (1948)
- Miss Mink of 1949 (1949)
- Tucson (1949)
