= No Hands on the Clock =

1941 film by Frank McDonald

- Directed by: Frank McDonald
- Written by: Maxwell Shane
- Based on: No Hands on the Clock by Geoffrey Homes
- Produced by: William H. Pine; William C. Thomas
- Starring: Chester Morris; Jean Parker; Rose Hobart
- Cinematography: Fred Jackman Jr.
- Edited by: William H. Ziegler
- Music by: Paul Sawtell
- Production company: Pine-Thomas Productions
- Distributed by: Paramount Pictures
- Release date: 22 December 1941 (New York)
- Running time: 76 minutes
- Country: United States
- Language: English

No Hands on the Clock is a 1941 American comedy mystery film directed by Frank McDonald starring Chester Morris as detective Humphrey Campbell. The cast also included Jean Parker and Rose Hobart. It was produced by Pine-Thomas Productions and released by Paramount Pictures.

== Plot ==
Private detective Humphrey Campbell tracks down a runaway woman named Louise and ends up marrying her. On the way to Reno, Nevada, for their honeymoon, the couple stops at a bank, which is robbed by three men.

Humphrey's employer, Oscar Flack of the Flack Missing Persons Bureau, tracks the newlyweds to a Reno hotel. (Across from the hotel, Louise spots an odd advertising clock, which has no hands. This has no bearing on anything, however.) Oscar wants him to find a missing man, Hal Benedict. Louise convinces him to take the case after Oscar promises her a fur coat for locating Hal. They go to see Warren Benedict, Hal's father. When Humphrey learns the FBI may be involved, he wants nothing to do with the case, but Oscar gets him to change his mind. Humphrey tries to keep Louise out of danger, but she has other ideas and keeps tagging along.

In the hotel bar, Humphrey learns that Hal was often seen with a woman, a redhead named Irene Donovan. A blonde named "Gypsy" Toland offers him a ride to Irene's place, but when Humphrey is spotted by a furious Louise, he gets out of the car. Humphrey later finds Irene dead. He also finds a very much alive Rose Madden, Hal's fiancée, who protests that she did not kill Irene. They drive off in Rose's car, then park and start talking. Louise spots him with the brunette Rose. Louise is ready to walk out on Humphrey, but the police will not let her leave because her husband is now a murder suspect.

Humphrey goes to see Clyde Copley, a collections investigator who admits he was hired by Hal to retrieve letters Hal wrote to Irene; Irene had threatened to use them if he married Rose Madden. Humphrey is cleared of the murder when Police Chief Bates learns that he has a solid alibi.

Warren Benedict asks to see Humphrey, but three men fire at Humphrey and Louise as they drive to Benedict's ranch. In a shootout, Humphrey wounds two of the men and drives them off. Then Humphrey figures out why the silver dollar found in Irene's hand seemed familiar: it is the trademark of Red Harris, a bank robber. Afterward, Benedict shows Humphrey a ransom note demanding $50,000 for Hal's return and specifying that Benedict's foreman Harry Belding drop off the money that night. Humphrey tells Benedict to do as ordered.

Humphrey is accosted by two FBI agents. They are looking for a bank robber, and the sketch looks very much like Humphrey, but Oscar vouches for him. Later, Belding is murdered and robbed while on his way to deliver the ransom money.

Eventually, Gypsy lures Humphrey into an abduction; it turns out that Red Harris wants revenge on Stafford, Humphrey's crooked lookalike. Red has to be convinced that Humphrey is not the one he wants. Humphrey determines that Red does not know any of the murder suspects, at least under their real names, so Humphrey suggests that Red stand outside a window to try to identify the person who knows him well enough to know his trademark. Red does not trust him, but Louise, who was caught snooping outside, offers to be Red's hostage.

Humphrey gathers everybody in Copley's office. Red does not spot anyone he knows and is killed in a shootout with the FBI agents, tipped off by an anonymous phone call. Humphrey finally realizes the killer must be Copley.

== Cast ==
- Chester Morris as Detective Humphrey Campbell
- Jean Parker as Mrs. Louise Campbell
- Rose Hobart as Mrs. Marion West
- Dick Purcell as Red Harris
- Astrid Allwyn as Gypsy Toland
- Rod Cameron as Tom Reed
- Lorin Raker as Clyde Copley
- Billie Seward as Rose Madden
- George Watts as Oscar Flack
- James Kirkwood as Warren Benedict
- Robert Middlemass as Police Chief Bates
- Ralph Sanford as Officer Gimble
- Grant Withers as Harry Belding
- George J. Lewis as Dave Paulson
- Keye Luke as Severino (uncredited)
- Milburn Stone as FBI man (uncredited)

== Original novel ==
The film was based on a 1939 novel by Daniel Mainwaring writing under the name "Geoffrey Homes". It was the second in a series of novels about detective Humphrey Campbell, following Then There Were Three (1938). Later novels in the series would be Finders Keepers (1940), Forty Whacks (1941) and The Six Silver Handles (1944). Forty Whacks would be filmed as Crime by Night (1944).

== Production ==
In June 1941 Paramount announced they had bought the screen rights to the novel and hired Mainwaring to write the script. However, Mainwaring is not credited on the final film for doing the screenplay.

This film was the first of a three-picture deal between Morris and Pine-Thomas, who made films for distribution through Paramount. It was the company's fourth film and the first time they had used a star who was not Richard Arlen. Pine Thomas announced they had taken options on three other Humphrey Campbell stories from Homes/Mainwaring. (They also optioned Mainwaring's The Hands on the Clock Stand Still.)

Filming started 15 August 1941. Rose Hobart replaced Florence Rice who was originally cast.

Keye Luke was signed to play a Chinese houseboy. But the Chinese had a policy that their actors should not play servants unless there were also servants of other races. So Luke played the part as a Filipino.

Mainwaring was later hired to write scripts for Pine-Thomas. The writer said, "Bill Thomas... who made very small and very bad pictures at Paramount, gave me my first real screenwriting job. I wrote six pictures in one year, all of which I'd just as soon forget except Big Town. At the end of the year, I fled to the hills and wrote Build My Gallows High."

== Reception ==
The Los Angeles Times said "devotees of shoot-em-up melodrama will no doubt find it to their liking." The New York Times called it "a mystery of no great consequence, not too tediously told."

However, Pine-Thomas made no further Humphrey films.

== See also ==
- Follow That Woman
