= The Big Steal =

1949 film by Don Siegel

- Theatrical release poster
- Directed by: Don Siegel
- Screenplay by: Gerald Drayson Adams; Daniel Mainwaring (credited as Geoffrey Homes)
- Based on: "The Road to Carmichael's"; 1942 story in The Saturday Evening Post by Richard Wormser
- Produced by: Jack J. Gross
- Starring: Robert Mitchum; Jane Greer; William Bendix; Patric Knowles; Ramón Novarro
- Cinematography: Harry J. Wild
- Edited by: Samuel E. Beetley
- Music by: Leigh Harline
- Distributed by: RKO Pictures
- Release date: July 1, 1949 (US)
- Running time: 71 minutes
- Country: United States
- Language: English
- Budget: $780,000
- Box office: $1.6 million

The Big Steal is a 1949 American black-and-white film noir that stars Out of the Past stars Robert Mitchum and Jane Greer. The film was directed by Don Siegel, based on the short story "The Road to Carmichael's" by Richard Wormser.

== Plot ==
U.S. Army lieutenant Duke Halliday (Robert Mitchum) is robbed of a $300,000 payroll by Jim Fiske (Patric Knowles). When Halliday's superior, Captain Vincent Blake (William Bendix), suspects him of having taken part in the theft, Halliday pursues Fiske into Mexico. Along the way, he runs into Joan Graham (Jane Greer), who is also after Fiske, she for $2000 loaned to her now ex-boyfriend. The two join forces, tentatively at first, unsure if they can trust each other.

When Halliday is knocked down trying to stop Fiske from getting away, he comes to the attention of Police Inspector General Ortega (Ramon Novarro). Halliday claims to be Blake, using identification he took from him after a brawl. Ortega lets him go after Fiske, but keeps an eye on him. His suspicions towards Halliday are confirmed when the real Blake shows up at his office seeking help.

Fiske stays one step ahead of his pursuers as they chase him from Veracruz past Tehuacan deeper into Puebla. All the while Halliday is dogged with equal ardor by Blake.

Halliday and Graham ultimately track Fiske to a safehouse in the desert, where a fence, Seton (John Qualen), offers him $150,000 in untraceable bills in exchange for the payroll. After a shootout, the couple are captured by Seton's henchmen. When Blake shows up, Halliday is initially relieved to be rescued, until Blake reveals that he is actually the brains behind the crime.

Fiske turns squeamish at the prospect of Graham being murdered and dumped in the desert along with Halliday, and proposes taking her with him. Blake, who is calling all the shots, rejects the idea, and in an act that shocks everyone shoots Fiske in the back when he goes to leave. Revealing just how ruthless he is, he then calmly explains to the others that his cover story will be that his late ex-partner, “apparently still at large”, will take the blame for the missing payroll. Seeking to twist Blake’s confession back on him, Halliday then points out to Seton that if Blake gets rid of him too, he can cover his tracks with the army by giving the stolen money back to it and keep the $150,000 for himself.

Alarmed, and taking no chances, Seton pulls a gun on everyone, and disarms Blake. Graham then creates a distraction for Halliday to jump Blake, whom he bests in a bruising fistfight, while she accidentally wounds Seton during a successful struggle over his gun. Ortega is called to come make the arrests.

Cleared by Ortega of all wrongdoing, Halliday is free to return to the army. When he indicates to a waiting Graham there is nothing to do in Mexico to keep him there any longer, she points his attention to a passing Mexican couple parading their seven children. He gets her drift as she smiles coyly.

== Cast ==
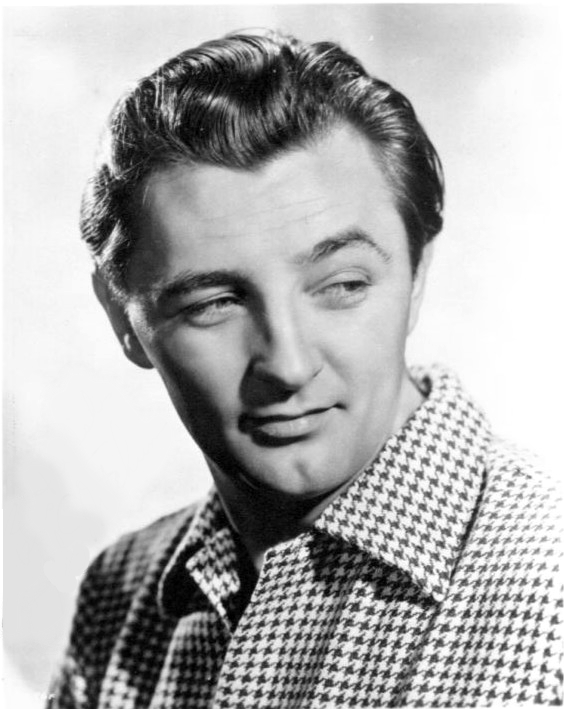
Mitchum, 1949

- Robert Mitchum as Lt. Duke Halliday
- Jane Greer as Joan Graham
- William Bendix as Capt. Vincent Blake
- Patric Knowles as Jim Fiske
- Ramon Novarro as Inspector General Ortega
- Don Alvarado as Lt. Ruiz
- John Qualen as Julius Seton
- Pascual García Peña as Manuel

== Production ==
=== Casting ===
Robert Mitchum's arrest for possession of marijuana on September 1, 1948, and his subsequent conviction and incarceration, had a large impact on the production of The Big Steal. RKO head Howard Hughes saw Mitchum's notoriety surrounding the arrest (the actor already seen as a 'bad boy' in Hollywood) as a positive that would boost attention for a rather low-rent - but hopefully profitable - production.

George Raft was originally cast, but was replaced by Mitchum after the arrest. Lizabeth Scott was slated for the female lead but quit three weeks prior to filming due to the arrest, and was replaced by Jane Greer (Mitchum and Greer had been earlier paired in the successful 1947 noir Out of the Past). Hughes had been keeping Greer, a former girlfriend, from appearing in any RKO films in an attempt to ruin her career, but finally conceded when no other actress would take the part. The film features one of the final screen appearances of Ramon Novarro, who had been a major star in the 1920s and 1930s.

=== Filming ===
Filming (Los Angeles and Tehuacán, Puebla, Mexico) was rushed in order to capitalize on the publicity generated by Mitchum's drug charges and incarceration, with some scenes shot while Mitchum was serving his sentence. Siegel commented upon the effect of Mitchum's absence upon a scene in which William Bendix pursues Mitchum through a forest, shot three months apart:

Mitchum in the picture would come running into a sequence and the trees would be green, and Bendix would be right on his heels and the tree would be bare.

Jane Greer's pregnancy ensured that the schedule was kept tight. This was part of the reason for the film's relatively short 71 minute runtime. Despite this Siegel said the film came in under budget.

The screenwriters Gerald Drayson Adams and Daniel Mainwaring (nom de plume Geoffrey Homes), were undecided as to Mitchum's film characterization, and according to film critic Judith M. Kass, viewers may be “confused about Mitchum’s motives until the final chase and denouement.”

== Release ==
Capitalizing on Michum's headlines was a proven scheme for Hughes, who immediately following the arrest had pushed for another of Mitchum's pictures, Rachel and the Stranger, to be released sooner than planned. Rachel was released on September 18, 1948, and became one of the year's biggest hits.

== Reception ==
=== Critical response ===
Channel 4 film reviews describes the movie as "Sparkling dialogues, fast-paced chases and the occasional twist make this an at first somewhat confusing but ultimately hugely entertaining film."

Hal Erickson writing for AllMovie calls the film "tautly directed by Don Siegel, who manages to pack plenty of twists and turns into the film's crowded 71 minutes."

Critic Judith M. Kass, writing in The Hollywood Professionals, Volume 4 (1976), singles out Jane Greer's performance for special mention: “The real support for Mitchum comes from Greer, who is fast-talking, quick-thinking and light on her feet as any masculine lead…”

== Home media ==
The U.K. Region 2 DVD from 2008 (in a box set with 8 other film noir thrillers) is a colorised version, produced by Turner Entertainment, copyrighted 1991.

The U.S (multi region) DVD from 2007 is the black and white version and is on a double bill with 1955’s Illegal (1955 film) starring Edward G. Robinson.

Has been shown on the Turner Classic Movies show 'Noir Alley' with Eddie Muller.

== Sources ==
- Kass, Judith M. (1975). Don Seigel: The Hollywood Professionals, Volume 4 (1975 ed.). New York: Tanvity Press. p. 207. ISBN 0-498-01665-X.
