= Big Town (1947 film) =

1947 film by William C. Thomas

- Theatrical release poster
- Directed by: William C. Thomas
- Screenplay by: Daniel Mainwaring; Maxwell Shane
- Story by: Daniel Mainwaring
- Produced by: William H. Pine; William C. Thomas
- Starring: Phillip Reed; Hillary Brooke; Robert Lowery; Veda Ann Borg; Byron Barr; Charles Arnt
- Cinematography: Fred Jackman Jr.
- Edited by: Howard A. Smith
- Music by: Darrell Calker
- Production company: Pine-Thomas Productions
- Distributed by: Paramount Pictures
- Release date: May 23, 1947
- Running time: 60 minutes
- Country: United States
- Language: English

Big Town is a 1947 American crime film directed by William C. Thomas and written by Daniel Mainwaring and Maxwell Shane. The film stars Phillip Reed, Hillary Brooke, Robert Lowery, Veda Ann Borg, Byron Barr and Charles Arnt. The first in a series of four films based on the long-running radio program Big Town, it was released on May 23, 1947, by Paramount Pictures.

== Cast ==
- Phillip Reed as Steve Wilson
- Hillary Brooke as Lorelei Kilbourne
- Robert Lowery as Pete Ryan
- Veda Ann Borg as Vivian LeRoy
- Byron Barr as Vance Crane
- Charles Arnt as Amos Peabody
- Nana Bryant as Mrs. Crane
- Roy Gordon as Editor Post
- Eddie Parks as Gerald Meeker
- Nella Walker as Mrs. Johannsen
- Thomas E. Jackson as Police Chief Berkley

== Production ==
Pine Thomas bought film rights in 1945 intended to make two films a year in the series.

The script was written by Daniel Mainwaring who later recalled, "Bill Thomas of Pine and Thomas, who made very small and very bad pictures at Paramount, gave me my first real screenwriting job. I wrote six pictures in one year, all of which I'd just as soon forget except Big Town [1947]. At the end of the year, I fled to the hills and wrote Build My Gallows High."

== Comic book adaptation ==
- Fiction House Movie Comics #1 (December 1946)

== See also ==
- Big Town radio series
