= Tokyo Rose (film) =

1946 film by Lew Landers

- Directed by: Lew Landers
- Screenplay by: Daniel Mainwaring; Maxwell Shane
- Produced by: William H. Pine
- Starring: Byron Barr; Osa Massen; Donald Douglas; Keye Luke
- Cinematography: Fred Jackman Jr.
- Edited by: Henry Adams; Howard A. Smith
- Music by: Rudy Schrager
- Production company: Pine-Thomas Productions
- Distributed by: Paramount Pictures
- Release date: February 8, 1946
- Running time: 69 minutes
- Country: United States
- Language: English

Tokyo Rose is a 1946 American war thriller film directed by Lew Landers and starring Byron Barr, Osa Massen, Donald Douglas and Keye Luke. It was produced by Pine-Thomas Productions and was released on February 8, 1946, by Paramount Pictures. It is a completely fictitious story inspired by the Tokyo Rose World War II propaganda broadcasts, and is not based on the real story of Iva Toguri.

== Plot ==
Pete Sherman an American prisoner of war being held in Japan during World War II is enlisted by his captors to take part in broadcasts designed to weaken Allied morale. He manages to escape and with the help of a war correspondent from neutral Ireland by impersonating a Swedish journalist killed in a recent bombing raid. He is also aided by Greta, the sister of the dead man. Put in touch with the anti-government underground, and he hatches a plan to kidnap Tokyo Rose.

== Cast ==
- Byron Barr as Pete Sherman
- Osa Massen as Greta Norburg
- Donald Douglas as Timothy O'Brien
- Richard Loo as Colonel Suzuki
- Keye Luke as Charlie Otani
- Grace Lem as Soon Hee
- Leslie Fong as Wong Chu
- H.T. Tsiang as Chang Yu
- Larry Young as Jack Martin
- William Challee as Mike Kovac
- Christian Drake as Frank
- James Millican as Pvt. Al Wilson
- Albert Ruiz as Mel
- Blake Edwards as Joe Bridger
- Lotus Long as Tokyo Rose

== Bibliography ==
- Close, Frederick P. Tokyo Rose / An American Patriot: A Dual Biography. Scarecrow Press, 2009.
- Tucker, David C. Pine-Thomas Productions: A History and Filmography. McFarland, 2019.
