= Nella Walker =

American actress (1886–1971)

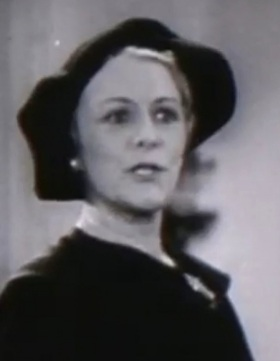
- Walker in trailer for Going Highbrow (1935)
- Born: March 6, 1886; Chicago, Illinois, U.S.
- Died: March 22, 1971 (aged 85); Los Angeles, California, U.S.
- Occupation: Actress
- Years active: 1912–1954
- Spouse(s): Wilbur Mack (m. 1910; div. 19??)

Nella Walker (March 6, 1886 – March 22, 1971) was an American actress and vaudeville performer of the 1920s through the 1950s.

== Biography ==
The daughter of Mr. and Mrs. Charles Walker, she was born and raised in Chicago. In 1910, she married Wilbur Mack. In 1912, they formed the vaudeville team Mack and Walker. By 1929, she had launched a film acting career, her first film role being in Tanned Legs. She appeared in three films in 1929 and easily transitioned to sound films, appearing in another four films in 1930, possibly making the smooth transition because she was never an established actress in silent films.

In 1931, her film career took off, with appearances in 10 films that year, five of which were uncredited. Her marriage ended not long after her film career was on the rise, and from 1932 to 1933, she appeared in 15 films, only five of which were uncredited. In 1935, her career improved, and from this year to 1938, she had 23 film appearances. Her biggest film appearance during this period was in Young Dr. Kildare with Lionel Barrymore and Lew Ayres. Throughout the 1930s, her career was strong, and despite never being a premier star, she repeatedly had solid acting roles. She finished the decade strongly in 1939 with nine film roles, only three of which were uncredited.

The 1940s mirrored her success of the previous decade in many ways, with appearances in 37 films from 1940 to 1947. Later in her career, and over 60 years of age, she slowed her career for a time, not having another role until 1950 when she appeared in Nancy Goes to Rio with Ann Sothern and Carmen Miranda. She appeared in another two films in 1952, then had her last film acting role in 1954 in the film Sabrina with Humphrey Bogart and Audrey Hepburn.

== Last years and death ==
She appeared in 117 movies, settling in Los Angeles, where she was residing at the time of her death on March 22, 1971, at age 85.

== Selected filmography ==
- Chinatown Nights (1929; voice double)
- Tanned Legs (1929) - Mrs. Sophie Reynolds
- The Vagabond Lover (1929) - Mrs. Whittington Todhunter
- Seven Keys to Baldpate (1929) - Mrs. Irene Rhodes
- Alias French Gertie (1930) - Morton's Wife
- Rain or Shine (1930) - Mrs. Conway
- What a Widow! (1930) - Marquise
- Extravagance (1930) - Mrs. Kendall
- The Hot Heiress (1931) - Mrs. Hunter
- Indiscreet (1931) - Mrs. Woodward
- Hush Money (1931) - Mrs. Stockton (uncredited)
- Their Mad Moment (1931) - Suzanne Stanley
- The Common Law (1931) - Yacht Guest (uncredited)
- The Public Defender (1931) - Aunt Matilda
- An American Tragedy (1931) - Hotel Guest (uncredited)
- The Bargain (1931) - The Patroness
- Daughter of the Dragon (1931) - Lady Petrie (uncredited)
- Susan Lenox (1931) - Dinner Guest (uncredited)
- Lady with a Past (1932) - Aunt Emma
- As You Desire Me (1932) - Lucia Marco (uncredited)
- Is My Face Red? (1932) - Mildred's Aunt Vickie (uncredited)
- Down to Earth (1932) - Mrs. Cameron (uncredited)
- Trouble in Paradise (1932) - Mme. Bouchet (uncredited)
- They Call It Sin (1932) - Mrs. Hollister
- 20,000 Years in Sing Sing (1932) - Mrs. Long (uncredited)
- Frisco Jenny (1932) - Janet Reynolds (uncredited)
- Second Hand Wife (1933) - Mrs. Cavendish
- Sensation Hunters (1933) - Mrs. Grayson
- Dangerously Yours (1933) - Lady Gregory
- Humanity (1933) - Mrs. James Pelton
- Reunion in Vienna (1933) - Countess Von Stainz
- This Day and Age (1933) - Little Fellow's Moll (uncredited)
- Ace of Aces (1933) - Mrs. Adams
- Ever in My Heart (1933) - Cousin Martha Sewell
- The House on 56th Street (1933) - Eleanor Van Tyle
- Four Frightened People (1934) - Mrs. Ainger
- The Ninth Guest (1934) - Margaret Chisholm
- All of Me (1934) - Mrs. Darrow
- Fashions of 1934 (1934) - Mrs. Van Tyle
- Change of Heart (1934) - Mrs. Frieda Mockby
- Madame Du Barry (1934) - Mme. de Noailles
- Elmer and Elsie (1934) - Mrs. Eva Kincaid
- Desirable (1934) - Eve - aka Madame Françoise (uncredited)
- Big Hearted Herbert (1934) - Mrs. Goodrich
- Behold My Wife! (1934) - Mrs. Copperwaithe (uncredited)
- Fugitive Lady (1934) - Mrs. Brooks
- The Right to Live (1935) - Mrs. Pride
- Under Pressure (1935) - Aunt Alice Simpson (uncredited)
- The Woman in Red (1935) - Aunt Bettina
- McFadden's Flats (1935) - Mrs. Hall
- A Dog of Flanders (1935) - Frau Vanderkloot
- Going Highbrow (1935) - Mrs. Forrester Marsh
- Dante's Inferno (1935) - Mrs. Hamilton (uncredited)
- Red Salute (1935) - Aunt Betty
- I Live My Life (1935) - Ruth's Mother (uncredited)
- Coronado (1935) - Mrs. Gloria Marvin
- Klondike Annie (1936) - Missionary (uncredited)
- Small Town Girl (1936) - Mrs. Dakin
- Captain January (1936) - Mrs. John Mason
- Don't Turn 'Em Loose (1936) - Helen Webster
- Three Smart Girls (1936) - Dorothy Craig
- Stella Dallas (1937) - Mrs. Grosvenor
- 45 Fathers (1937) - Mrs. Carter
- The Crime of Doctor Hallet (1938) - Mrs. Carpenter
- The Rage of Paris (1938) - Mrs. Duncan
- Professor Beware (1938) - Travelers Aid Society Clerk (uncredited)
- Young Dr. Kildare (1938) - Mrs. Chanler
- Hard to Get (1938) - Mrs. Emmy Atwater (uncredited)
- Made for Each Other (1939) - Dr. Langham's Nurse-Receptionist (uncredited)
- The Saint Strikes Back (1939) - Mrs. Betty Fernack
- Three Smart Girls Grow Up (1939) - Dorothy Craig
- In Name Only (1939) - Mrs. Walker
- When Tomorrow Comes (1939) - Betty Dumont
- These Glamour Girls (1939) - Mrs. Christy - Carol's Mother (uncredited)
- Espionage Agent (1939) - Mrs. Peyton (uncredited)
- A Child Is Born (1939) - Mrs. Twitchell
- Swanee River (1939) - Mrs. McDowell
- Irene (1940) - Mrs. Marshall (uncredited)
- The Saint Takes Over (1940) - Mrs. Lucy Fernack
- I Love You Again (1940) - Kay's Mother
- No Time for Comedy (1940) - First-Nighter (uncredited)
- Little Men (1940) - Truant Officer (uncredited)
- Kitty Foyle (1940) - Aunt Jessica
- Blame It on Love (1940) - Virginia Francis
- Buck Privates (1941) - Mrs. Parker II
- Back Street (1941) - Corinne Saxel
- A Girl, a Guy and a Gob (1941) - Mrs. Grange
- Repent at Leisure (1941) - Mrs. Sally Baldwin
- Reaching for the Sun (1941) - Nurse
- Million Dollar Baby (1941) - Mrs. Amory, Jim's Mother (uncredited)
- Manpower (1942) - FloorLady (uncredited)
- Kathleen (1941) - Mrs. Farrell
- Hellzapoppin' (1941) - Mrs. Rand
- Kid Glove Killer (1942) - Mrs. Daniels
- Sauce for the Gander (1942) - Mrs. Bentley
- We Were Dancing (1942) - Mrs. Janet Bentley
- Blondie for Victory (1942) - Mrs. Holbrook, Fashion Show Director (uncredited)
- Air Raid Wardens (1943) - Millicent Norton
- Hers to Hold (1943) - Dorothy Craig
- What a Woman! (1943) - Senator's Wife (uncredited)
- Ladies of Washington (1944) - Mrs. Crane (uncredited)
- Take It or Leave It (1944) - Mrs. Preston (uncredited)
- In Society (1944) - Mrs. Van Cleve
- Murder in the Blue Room (1944) - Linda Baldrich
- A Guy, a Gal and a Pal (1945) - General's Wife (uncredited)
- The Clock (1945) - Marriage Clerk (uncredited)
- Follow That Woman (1945) - Mrs. Henderson
- Two Sisters from Boston (1946) - Mrs. Lawrence Tyburt Patterson Sr.
- Big Town (1946) - Mrs. Johannsen, victim's mother
- The Locket (1946) - Mrs. Wendell
- The Beginning or the End (1947) - Grace Tully
- Undercover Maisie (1947) - Mrs. Andrew Lorrison
- Variety Girl (1947) - Mrs. Webster
- The Unfinished Dance (1947) - Dress Designer (uncredited)
- Magic Town (1947) - Grandview Citizen (uncredited)
- This Time for Keeps (1947) - Harriet Allenbury (uncredited)
- That Hagen Girl (1947) - Molly Freneau
- Nancy Goes to Rio (1950) - Mrs. Harrison
- Flesh and Fury (1952) - Mrs. Hackett
- Young Man with Ideas (1952) - Mrs. Jethrow (uncredited)
- Sabrina (1954) - Maude Larrabee
