= Pitfall (1948 film) =

1948 film by André de Toth

- Theatrical release poster
- Directed by: André de Toth
- Screenplay by: Karl Kamb; André de Toth (uncredited); William Bowers (uncredited)
- Based on: The Pitfall; 1947 novel by Jay Dratler
- Produced by: Samuel Bischoff
- Starring: Dick Powell; Lizabeth Scott; Jane Wyatt; Raymond Burr
- Cinematography: Harry J. Wild
- Edited by: Walter Thompson
- Production company: Regal Films
- Distributed by: United Artists
- Release date: August 24, 1948 (US)
- Running time: 86 minutes
- Country: United States
- Language: English
- Budget: nearly $1 million

Pitfall is a 1948 American film noir crime film directed by André de Toth. The film is based on the novel The Pitfall by Jay Dratler, stars Dick Powell, Lizabeth Scott, and Jane Wyatt, and features Raymond Burr.

== Plot ==
John "Johnny" Forbes (Dick Powell) is a family man bored with his job at an insurance agency and dreaming of adventure. When private investigator and former policeman J.B. "Mac" MacDonald (Raymond Burr), doing work for the agency, tells him he's located proceeds of embezzlement the company is liable for, in the form of expensive gifts to the imprisoned embezzler's girlfriend, Forbes decides to recover them himself. MacDonald mentions he's attracted to the girlfriend and Forbes doesn't trust him to stick to business.

Forbes visits the apartment of attractive model Mona Stevens (Lizabeth Scott), who touches a nerve by calling him a "little man with a briefcase." Cooperating, she goes over the list of things her criminal fiancé Bill Smiley (Byron Barr) gave her, including a boat. As they drive out to see the boat, and during a ride on it, they warm to each other, and that evening go for a drink and dinner. MacDonald, waiting outside her apartment, sees Forbes leave after dropping her off.

The next morning MacDonald is waiting for Forbes in his office and asks about the boat that isn't on the list of reclaimed items, which Forbes says he must have missed. With a hint of threat in his manner, MacDonald again mentions his interest in Stevens and asks what Forbes was talking to her about for so long the previous evening; Forbes ignores the question. When Forbes visits Stevens that evening he tells her he'll have to take the boat, as MacDonald could make trouble for him if he doesn't. Stevens tells him MacDonald was pounding on her door that evening "until all hours." When Forbes returns home MacDonald is waiting for him, says he was tailing Forbes and proceeds to beat him up, saying, "Maybe this'll keep you home where you belong for a few days."

The next day Stevens tries to phone Forbes at the insurance agency and learns he called in sick so she drives to his home to visit him, but as she pulls up she overhears his wife Sue (Jane Wyatt) speaking with the doctor and his son in front of the house, and realizes Forbes is a family man. When Forbes recovers and visits her again, Mona ends the relationship. At first sad, Forbes soon realizes he's made a mistake and again comes to value his wife and family.

MacDonald harasses Stevens at her job and outside her apartment when she returns home. When she says she's going to call the police he threatens to ruin Forbes's marriage by telling his wife about the affair. Stevens tells Forbes about the threat and Forbes goes to MacDonald's apartment, beats him up, and tells him he'll kill him if he ever threatens his family again.

MacDonald then visits Smiley in prison and upsets him by telling him his girl was fooling around with an insurance adjuster named Forbes. When Smiley is released, Stevens finds him in her apartment drinking, with a gun given to him by MacDonald, asking about Forbes. Mona admits the affair but says it's over, and Smiley says he can forgive her but not Forbes, then leaves. Mona phones Forbes to warn him about Smiley. With Sue and his son upstairs, Forbes gets his gun, turns out the lights and kills Smiley when he tries to break in.

MacDonald, who was outside Forbes's house in his car during the shooting, visits a worried Stevens. As she listens he calls a friend on the police force to find out what happened and is told that Smiley was shot, and that Forbes is claiming he was a prowler. During a pause on the phone with his former colleague he says to Stevens, "You were going to who and tell them about me?," suggesting the police are unlikely to help if Stevens goes to them. MacDonald starts packing her bags, talking casually about how well things turned out and where they should go, while Stevens is rigid and nearly silent. At last she stands, pulls a pistol out of a desk drawer and shoots him twice.

Forbes confesses everything to Sue and despite her objections confesses to the district attorney (John Litel) as well, who tells him that killing Smiley was justifiable homicide. Stevens has been arrested for shooting MacDonald, who may or may not die of his wounds. What happens to her depends on MacDonald's fate, but the DA is sympathetic and says he thinks the wrong person is under arrest.

As John is preparing to leave the building housing the DA's office, he sees Mona being escorted through another door, although Mona does not see him. He hesitates, and does not say anything to get her attention.

Sue picks Forbes up from the DA's office and drives him away. Though grim in temperament, she says she doesn't want a divorce since he's been a good husband "except for 24 hours." The family will arrange to move to another town, and although their relationship is clearly damaged and both parties are emotionally numb, both Sue and John each pledge to give their marriage another try. As they drive into the distance, it's up to the audience to conclude as to whether the marriage has a chance or not.

== Cast ==
- Dick Powell as John Forbes
- Lizabeth Scott as Mona Stevens
- Jane Wyatt as Sue Forbes
- Raymond Burr as J.B. "Mac" MacDonald
- John Litel as District Attorney
- Byron Barr as Bill Smiley
- Jimmy Hunt as Tommy Forbes
- Ann Doran as Maggie
- Selmer Jackson as Ed Brawley
- Margaret Wells as Terry
- Dick Wessel as Desk Sergeant
- George Green as Elevator Operator

== Hays Code infraction ==
According to Madeleine Stowe, guest host on the May 21, 2016, Turner Classic Movies screening of the film, the production was in trouble because the script violated the Hays Code, as the adulterer was insufficiently punished. When director de Toth found out, he met with two senior Hays Code members, whom he had selected with care. De Toth revealed that he knew the two were both married and both had mistresses. There were no problems after that.

== Reception ==
Film historian Leonard Maltin gives Pitfall three stars (out of four), calling it an "intriguing film noir look at the American Dream gone sour, typified by Powell's character, who's got a house, a little boy, and a perfect wife−but feels bored and stifled."

Film critic Fernando F. Croce wrote about the screenplay and direction,

The title's abyss, pitilessly moral, sprawls horizontally rather than vertically, a lateral track following disheveled Dick Powell bottoming out, wandering the streets after confessing murder and adultery to wife Jane Wyatt. Fate may be at play, yet André de Toth's grip is less determinist than humanist, airtight but wounded, each pawn in the grid allowed trenchant space to deepen the fallout of their own actions.

Film critic Dennis Schwartz wrote of the film,

Powell is the archetypal average American man living out the American Dream in the suburbs, where his type is viewed as the backbone of the country. This film does a good job of poking holes at that dream, showing underneath the surface all is not well.

In his book, Dark City: The Film Noir, film historian Spencer Selby refers to Pitfall as a "disquieting noir thriller that doesn't seem entirely able to reaffirm the middle-class values its protagonist disregards."

Foster Hirsch, in Film Noir: The Dark Side of the Screen, names Pitfall as a prime example of a class of '50s Noir thrillers that "support the status quo out of fear rather than strong or healthy moral convictions," and he contends that "their mealy-mouthed morality may be a symptomatic response to the political witch-hunt that was invading the motion picture industry at the time. The search for communists may have enforced the idea that it is safer to stay home, minding your own business, than to stray into unknown territory."

A one-time police officer sued the producers for libel, claiming the film was based on him.

== Home media ==
Pitfall was released on Blu-ray and DVD by Kino Lorber Studio Classics in November 2015.
