= Covered Wagon Raid =

1950 film by R. G. Springsteen

- Theatrical release poster
- Directed by: R. G. Springsteen
- Screenplay by: M. Coates Webster
- Produced by: Gordon Kay
- Starring: Allan Lane; Eddy Waller; Alex Gerry; Lyn Thomas; Byron Barr; Dick Curtis
- Cinematography: John MacBurnie
- Edited by: Harry Keller
- Music by: Stanley Wilson
- Production company: Republic Pictures
- Distributed by: Republic Pictures
- Release date: June 30, 1950
- Running time: 60 minutes
- Country: United States
- Language: English

Covered Wagon Raid is a 1950 American Western film directed by R. G. Springsteen and written by M. Coates Webster. The film stars Allan Lane, Eddy Waller, Alex Gerry, Lyn Thomas, Byron Barr and Dick Curtis. It was released on June 30, 1950 by Republic Pictures.

== Plot ==
Settler and pioneer Bob Davis is shot by hired guns Grif and Brag, who work for saloonkeeper and prospective land baron Harvey "Deacon" Grimes. The killing is witnessed by insurance investigator Rocky Lane, who assumes an undercover identity to help Bob's daughter Susie.

Rancher's daughter Gail Warren becomes acquainted with Rocky but inadvertently reveals his true identity to Grimes and his men. Rocky is able to prevail, and he leaves town, promising to return.

== Cast ==
- Allan Lane as Rocky Lane
- Eddy Waller as Nugget Clark
- Alex Gerry as Deacon Harvey Grimes
- Lyn Thomas as Gail Warren
- Byron Barr as Roy Chandler
- Dick Curtis as Henchman Grif
- Pierce Lyden as Henchman Brag
- Sherry Jackson as Susie Davis
- Rex Lease as Bob Davis
- Lester Dorr as Bartender Pete
- Lee Roberts as Henchman Steve
- Black Jack as Black Jack
