= Follow That Woman =

1945 film by Lew Landers

- Theatrical release poster
- Directed by: Lew Landers
- Written by: Winston Miller; Ben Perry; Maxwell Shane
- Produced by: William H. Pine
- Starring: William Gargan; Nancy Kelly; Regis Toomey; Byron Barr; Edward Gargan
- Cinematography: Fred Jackman Jr.
- Edited by: Henry Adams; Howard A. Smith
- Music by: Alexander Laszlo
- Production company: Pine-Thomas Productions
- Distributed by: Paramount Pictures
- Release date: December 14, 1945
- Running time: 69 minutes
- Country: United States
- Language: English

Follow That Woman is a 1945 American comedy crime film directed by Lew Landers and starring William Gargan, Nancy Kelly and Regis Toomey. It was distributed by Paramount Pictures.

== Plot summary ==
Nancy spends the evening with her boyfriend at the Downtown Club, a notorious hangout for members of the criminal underworld. Quite recently the club was the scene of a murder. Nancy witnesses what she believes is a holdup at the very next table, and instinctively she hits the gunman over the head with a champagne bottle, knocking him out completely. The gunman, Sam Boone, is really an undercover police officer posing as a gangster, who was trying to make an arrest when Nancy hit him. Even though Nancy and Sam really didn't meet under the best of circumstances, they soon take a liking to each other and eventually marry. Exactly two years later they return to the Downtown Club and the ”crime scene” to celebrate their first meeting.

Sam has now transformed into being a private detective instead of police officer. When he and Nancy sit at their table, Sam is slipped a note from one of the singers, Marge Andrews. She wants to meet him in one of the club's dressing rooms. A while later he and Nancy enter the dressing room, but find Marge's body lying on the floor. She has been murdered, and Sam sees stains probably left by the murderer on the radiator. Afraid that a scandal and his association with a murder might spoil his chances of entering into an Army training program he has been accepted to, Sam decides to ignore the lead and not mention that he was ever in the dressing room. They leave, and Sam asks Nick, the nightclub host, not to tell the police he was the one who found Marge's dead body.

Sam leaves to join the Army, leaving Nancy behind, working with Butch, Sam's partner at the firm. One day Nancy and Butch get a phone call from a man named J.B. Henderson, who wants to hire a detective to find Marge Andrews. Henderson says he was supposed to meet Marge for a meeting the other day and was worried when she didn't show up. Nancy is surprised by the fact that the truth about what happened to Marge hadn't been exposed.

Nancy contacts the nightclub host Nick and asks him about the murder scene, but he denies ever hearing about it. Nancy and Butch get suspicious, and late that night they break into Marge's apartment to get some clues of what had happened. As they search the apartment for clues a shot is fired, missing them both. The shooter is able to flee the scene without revealing himself to them.

Butch sends a letter to Sam at the Army camp, asking him to leave his duty, to come back home and convince his wife that she should stop playing private detective. Sam manages to get a short leave from the camp from his commander. Before he leaves he promises the commander that he will prove what had happened to Marge, and find her lost body.

Sam has seven days to complete the investigation and prove what happened to Marge before he has to return to camp. Back in the city, he tries to take over the investigation from Nancy, but she refuses to let the case go. When he insists, she goes on to make her own investigation.

Sam talks to a gambling operator at the club named Barney Manners, who used to be Marge's boyfriend, and finds out that Marge was with Henderson the same night she was killed. During their conversation, Sam discovers a cut on Barney's hand, but he doesn't suspect Barney of being the murderer. Sam goes to Henderson and finds out that Marge had a few more men around her, including a college student by the name of John Evans. The student had been very keen on meeting Marge in the days just before she was killed.

Nancy is bold enough to sneak into the Henderson house, dressed up as a French maid. She searches the house for clues, and eventually finds a brooch, identical to the one stolen from Marge on the night of her murder. She goes on to investigate John Evans, and posing as a college student, she tried to make contact with him.

Meanwhile, Sam and Butch work together and manage to find the stolen brooch at a pawn shop. Sam, who believes he has found the solution to the murder mystery, gets all the prospective suspects to come to a party at the Downtown Club. While they are all the club, Sam exposes John Evans as Marge's killer and also finds Marge's body in a freezer. When the case is over, Sam enlists his wife Nancy without her knowing, to be able to keep an eye on her and out of trouble.

== Cast ==
- William Gargan as Sam Boone
- Nancy Kelly as Nancy Boone
- Regis Toomey as Barney Manners
- Byron Barr as John Evans
- Edward Gargan as Butch
- Don Costello as Nick
- Pierre Watkin as J.B. Henderson
- Nella Walker as Mrs. Henderson
- Audrey Young as Marge Andrews

== Production ==
The film was based on a story by Winston Miller and purchased as a vehicle for William Gargan.

Helen Walker turned down the female lead.

== See also ==
- No Hands on the Clock, a 1941 film
