= Byron Barr =

American actor (1917–1966)

- Born: August 18, 1917; Corning, Iowa
- Died: November 3, 1966 (aged 49); Sacramento County, California
- Occupation: Actor

Byron Barr (August 18, 1917 – November 3, 1966), sometimes billed as Byron S. Barr, was an American actor. He appeared in 19 films from 1944 to 1951.

Barr was born in Corning, Iowa, the son of Mr. and Mrs. Henry Barr.

Barr perhaps is best known for his role as Nino Zachetti in Double Indemnity, his first appearance. He also had a role in films like Love Letters, Pitfall, Down Dakota Way, They Made Me a Killer, and The File on Thelma Jordon. His only lead role came in the 1946 B-movie Tokyo Rose. Barr retired from acting in 1951. He died on November 3, 1966, in Sacramento County, California, of unknown causes at age 49.

== Filmography ==
- Double Indemnity (1944) — Nino Zachetti
- Practically Yours (1944) — Navigator (uncredited)
- The Affairs of Susan (1945) — Chick
- Love Letters (1945) — Derek Quinton
- Follow That Woman (1945) — John Evans
- Tokyo Rose (1946) — Pete Sherman
- They Made Me a Killer (1946) — Steve Reynolds
- Our Hearts Were Growing Up (1946) — Roger (uncredited)
- Big Town (1946) — Vance Crane
- Two Years Before the Mast (1946) — Friend (uncredited)
- Seven Were Saved (1947) — Lt. Martin Pinkert
- Public Prosecutor (1948, TV series) — Glenn Thursby
- The Main Street Kid (1948) — Bud Wheeling
- Pitfall (1948) — Bill Smiley
- Down Dakota Way (1949) — Steve Paxton
- The File on Thelma Jordon (1950) — McCary
- Paid in Full (1950) — Man at Bar (uncredited)
- Tarnished (1950) — Joe Pettigrew
- Appointment with Danger (1950) — Policeman (uncredited)
- Covered Wagon Raid (1950) — Roy Chandler (final film role)
