= Jane Wyatt =

American actress (1910–2006)

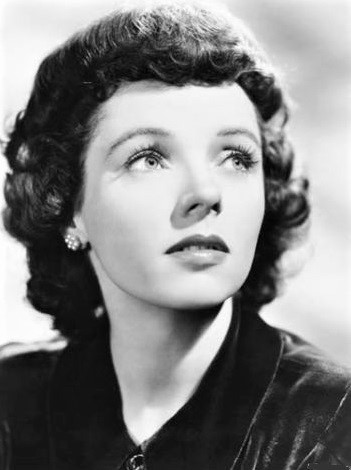
- Wyatt in the 1930s
- Born: Jane Waddington Wyatt; August 12, 1910; Franklin Lakes, New Jersey, U.S.
- Died: October 20, 2006 (aged 96); Los Angeles, California, U.S.
- Education: Barnard College
- Occupation: Actress
- Years active: 1931–1996
- Spouse: Edgar Bethune Ward (m. 1935; died 2000)
- Children: 3
- Awards: Emmy Award (1958, 1959, 1960)

Jane Waddington Wyatt (/ˈwaɪət/ WY-ət; August 12, 1910 – October 20, 2006) was an American actress. She starred in a number of Hollywood films, such as Frank Capra's Lost Horizon, but is likely best known for her role as homemaker and mother Margaret Anderson on the CBS and NBC television comedy series Father Knows Best, and as Amanda Grayson, the human mother of Spock on the science-fiction television series Star Trek. Wyatt was a three-time Emmy Award–winner.

== Early life ==
Wyatt was born on August 12, 1910, in Campgaw, a neighborhood in Franklin Lakes, New Jersey, and raised in Manhattan. Her father, Christopher Billopp Wyatt, was a broker. Her mother was Euphemia Van Rensselaer Waddington, granddaughter of Henry Bell Van Rensselaer. Wyatt had two sisters and a brother.

== Education ==
While in New York City, Wyatt attended Miss Chapin's School, where she had roles as Joan of Arc and as Shylock. She later attended two years of Barnard College. After leaving Barnard, she joined the apprentice school of the Berkshire Playhouse at Stockbridge, Massachusetts, where for six months she played a variety of roles.

== Stage and film ==
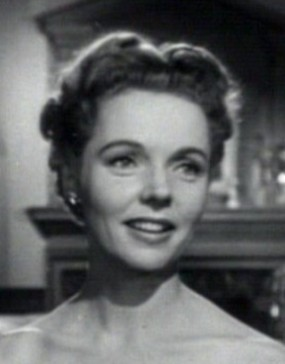
Wyatt in Gentleman's Agreement

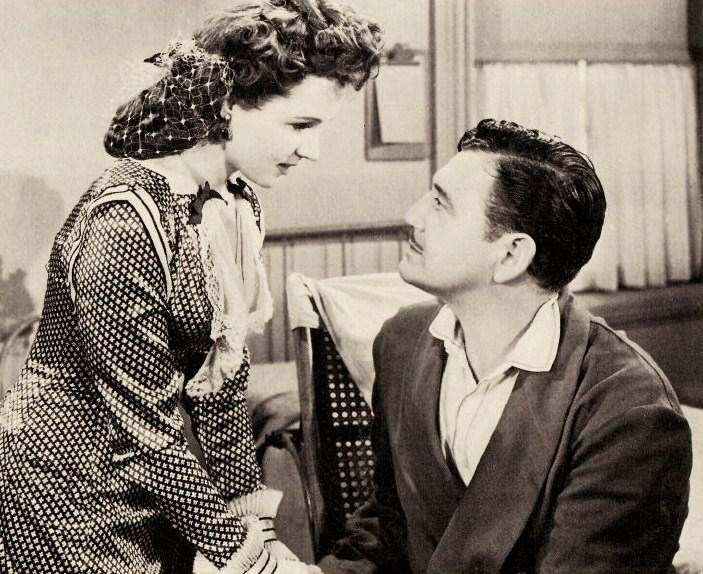
Jane Wyatt and Richard Dix in The Kansan in 1943

One of her first jobs on Broadway was as understudy to Rose Hobart in a production of Trade Winds—a career move that cost her her listing in the New York Social Register (she later was relisted upon her marriage). Receiving favorable notices on Broadway and celebrated for her understated beauty, Wyatt made the transition from stage to screen and was placed under contract by Universal Pictures.

She made her film debut in 1934 in One More River. Inarguably her most famous film role, she co-starred as Ronald Colman's character's love interest in Frank Capra's Columbia Pictures film Lost Horizon (1937). She reflected on Lost Horizon sixty years later in St. Anthony Messenger magazine:

During the war, they cut out all the pacifist parts of the film—the High Lama talking about peace in the world. All that was cut because they were trying to inspire those G.I.'s to get out there and go "bang! bang! bang!" which sort of ruined the film.

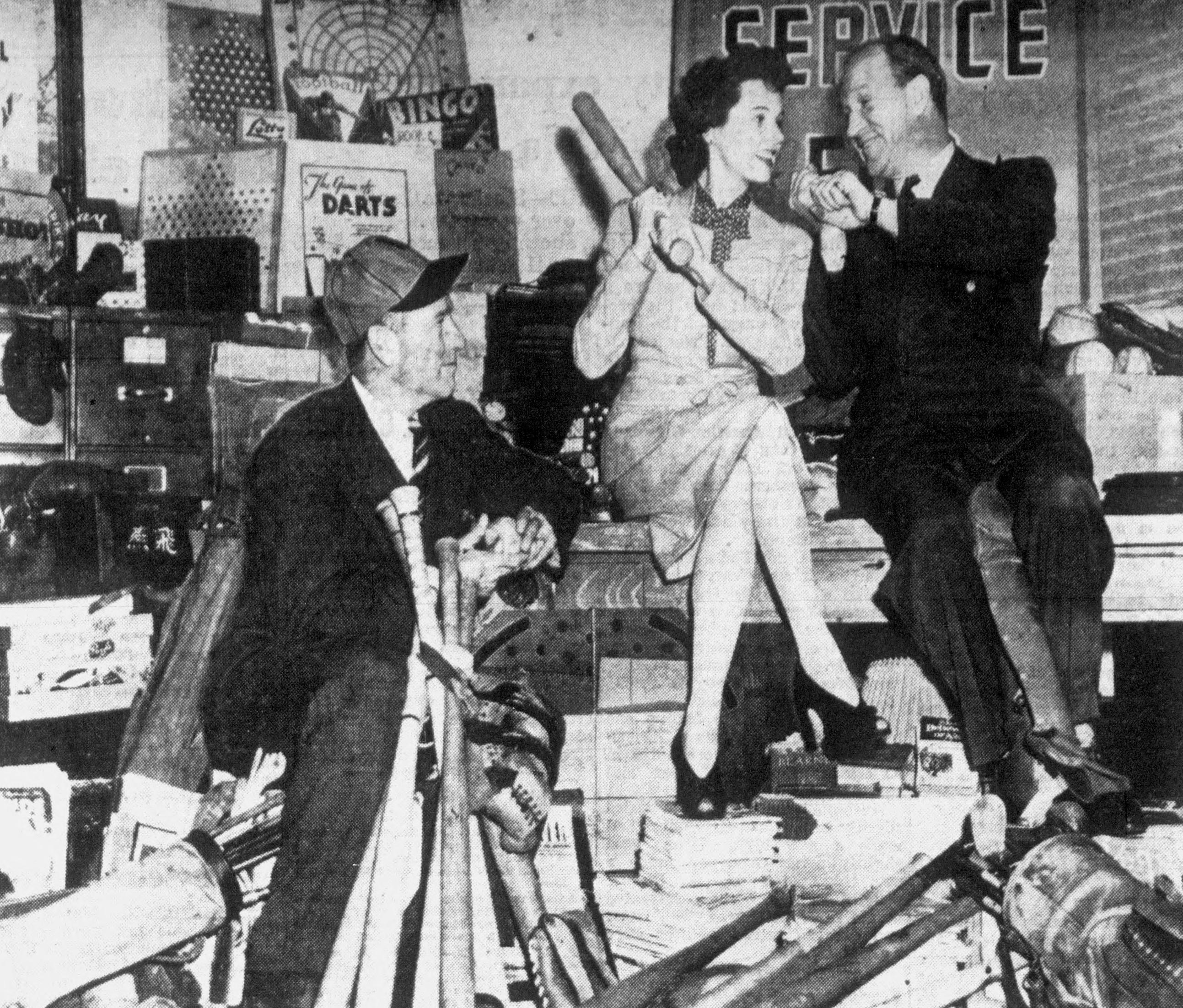
(L-R): Hollywood Stars manager Charlie Root, Jane Wyatt and Los Angeles Angels manager Bill Sweeney sit atop a pile of baseball equipment donated to members of the United States Armed Forces at military installations in Southern California in 1943

In 1939 Wyatt had not yet achieved her greatest fame when she appeared at Denver's legendary Elitch Theatre as the leading lady for the summer stock season, opposite Donald Woods. Her next film appearances included Gentleman's Agreement with Gregory Peck, None but the Lonely Heart with Cary Grant, Boomerang with Dana Andrews, and Our Very Own with Farley Granger. Wyatt co-starred in the crime dramas Pitfall and House by the River, and with Randolph Scott in a Western, Canadian Pacific. She played the wife of Gary Cooper in the war story Task Force.

Her film career suffered due to her outspoken opposition to Senator Joseph McCarthy, the chief figure in the anti-Communist investigations of that era, and was temporarily derailed for having assisted in hosting a performance by the Bolshoi Ballet during the Second World War, though it was at the request of President Franklin D. Roosevelt. Wyatt returned to her roots on the New York stage for a time and appeared in such plays as Lillian Hellman's The Autumn Garden, opposite Fredric March.

== Television ==
For many people, Wyatt is best remembered as Margaret Anderson on Father Knows Best, which aired from 1954 to 1960. She played opposite Robert Young as the devoted wife and mother of the Anderson family in the small town of Springfield. This role won consecutive Emmy Awards for her in 1958, 1959 and 1960 for best actress in a comedy series. After Father Knows Best, Wyatt guest-starred in several other series.

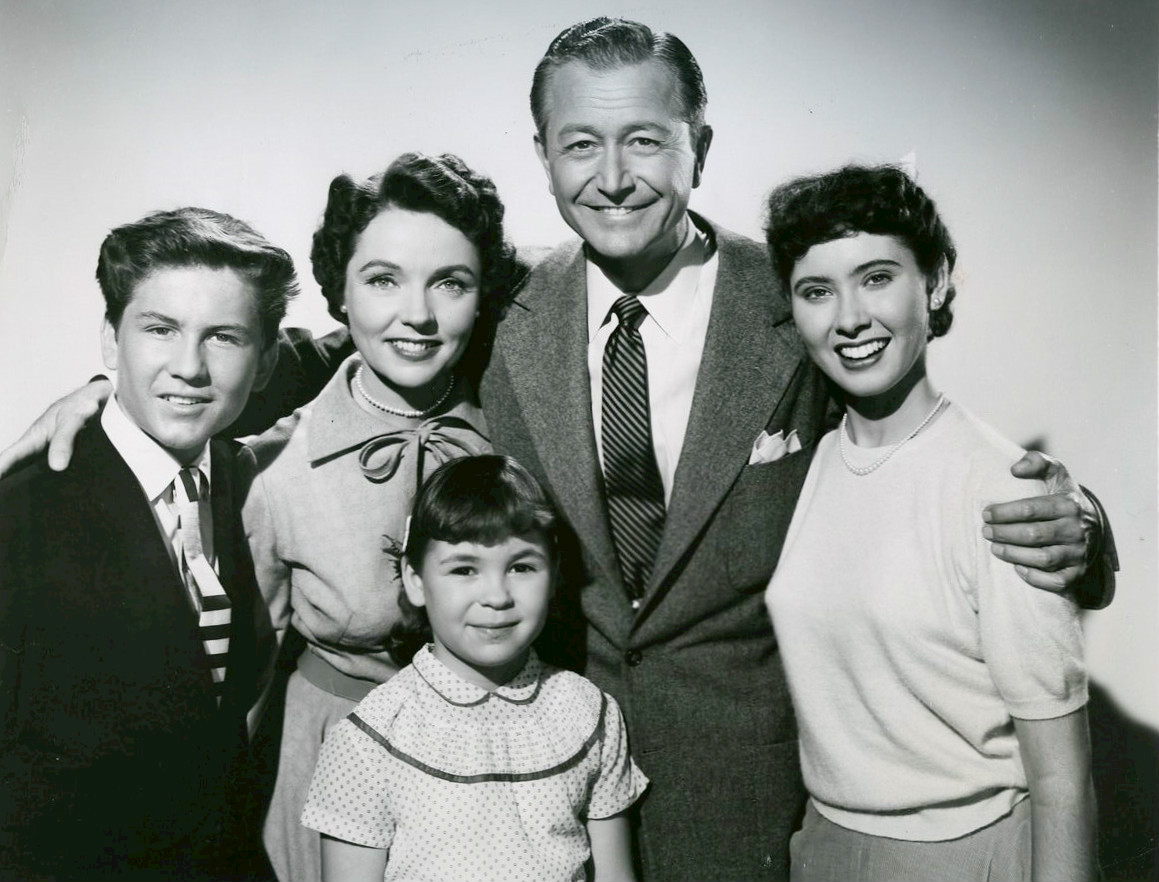
Cast photo of the Anderson family from the television program Father Knows Best (front): Lauren Chapin (back) (L-R): Billy Gray, Jane Wyatt, Robert Young and Elinor Donahue in 1954

On June 13, 1962, she was cast as the lead in "The Heather Mahoney Story" on NBC's Wagon Train. In 1963, she portrayed Kitty McMullen in "Don't Forget to Say Goodbye" on the ABC drama Going My Way, with Gene Kelly and Leo G. Carroll, a series about the Catholic priesthood in New York City. In 1964 Wyatt appeared as Mrs. Sarah Brynmar on The Virginian in the episode "The Secret of Brynmar Hall". In 1965, Wyatt was cast as Anne White in "The Monkey's Paw – A Retelling" on CBS's The Alfred Hitchcock Hour.

Wyatt portrayed Amanda Grayson, Spock's mother and Ambassador Sarek's (Mark Lenard) wife, in the 1967 episode "Journey to Babel" of the original NBC series Star Trek and in the 1986 film Star Trek IV: The Voyage Home. Wyatt was once quoted as saying her fan mail for these two appearances in this role exceeded that of Lost Horizon.

In 1969, she made a guest appearance on Here Come the Brides, but did not have any scenes with Mark Lenard, who was starring on the show as sawmill owner Aaron Stemple. Also in 1969, Wyatt appeared as a concerned mother in the first episode of the ABC comedy anthology series Love, American Style in a segment titled "Love and the Pill."

In 1970, Wyatt guest-starred in the episode "Wedding Day?????" (the five question marks being part of the title) in the second season of the TV sitcom The Ghost & Mrs. Muir, which played on ABC (the first season having played on NBC). She portrayed Emily Williams, the mother of Mrs. Muir.

In 1976, she guest-starred in an episode of Gibbsville, and she appeared as Anna, mother of the Virgin Mary, in the 1978 television film The Nativity. Late in her career, she appeared in a recurring role in the 1980s medical drama St. Elsewhere, as Katherine Auschlander, wife of hospital administrator Dr. Daniel Auschlander (Norman Lloyd).

She was given a star on the Hollywood Walk of Fame in 1960.

== Personal life ==
Wyatt was married to investment broker Edgar Bethune Ward from November 9, 1935, until his death on November 8, 2000. The couple met in the late 1920s when both were weekend houseguests of Franklin D. Roosevelt at Hyde Park, New York. They had three children.

Wyatt suffered a mild stroke in the 1990s but recovered well. She remained in relatively good health for the rest of her long life.

== Death ==
Wyatt died on October 20, 2006, at her home in Bel-Air, California, aged 96. Wyatt's family included three grandchildren and five great-grandchildren.

== Filmography ==
Year	Title	Role
1934	One More River	Dinny Cherrell
1934	Great Expectations	Estella
1935	We're Only Human	Sally Rogers
1936	The Luckiest Girl in the World	Pat Duncan
1937	Lost Horizon	Sondra Bizet
1940	Girl from God's Country	Anne Webster
1941	Kisses for Breakfast	Laura Anders
1941	Hurricane Smith	Joan Bradley
1941	Weekend for Three	Ellen
1942	Army Surgeon	Elizabeth "Beth" Ainsley
1942	The Navy Comes Through	Myra Mallory
1943	Buckskin Frontier	Vinnie Marr
1943	The Kansan	Eleanor Sager
1944	None but the Lonely Heart	Aggie Hunter
1946	Strange Conquest	Dr. Mary Palmer
1946	The Bachelor's Daughters	Marta Jordan
1947	Boomerang	Madge Harvey
1947	Gentleman's Agreement	Jane
1948	Pitfall	Sue Forbes
1948	No Minor Vices	Miss Darlington
1949	Bad Boy	Mrs. Maud Brown
1949	Canadian Pacific	Dr. Edith Cabot
1949	Task Force	Mary Morgan
1950	House by the River	Marjorie Byrne
1950	Our Very Own	Mrs. Fred (Lois) Macaulay
1950	My Blue Heaven	Janet Pringle
1950	The Man Who Cheated Himself	Lois Frazer
1951	Criminal Lawyer	Maggie Powell
1957	Interlude	Prue Stubbins
1961	The Two Little Bears	Anne Davis
1965	Never Too Late	Grace Kimbrough
1976	Treasure of Matecumbe	Aunt Effie
1986	Star Trek IV: The Voyage Home	Amanda Grayson

=== Television films ===
Year	Title	Role
1964	See How They Run	Augusta Flanders
1970	Weekend of Terror	Sister Frances
1973	You'll Never See Me Again	Mary Alden
1975	Katherine	Emily Alman
1976	Amelia Earhart	Amy Earhart
1978	Superdome	Fay Bonelli
1978	The Nativity	Anna
1989	Amityville 4: The Evil Escapes	Alice Leacock

== Radio appearances ==
Year	Program	Episode/source
1952	Family Theater	Pas de Deux
1952	Hollywood Sound Stage	Boomerang
1953	Theatre Guild on the Air	A Square Peg
