= Against All Odds (1984 film) =

1984 film directed by Taylor Hackford

- Theatrical release poster
- Directed by: Taylor Hackford
- Screenplay by: Eric Hughes
- Based on: Build My Gallows High; 1946 novel by Daniel Mainwaring
- Produced by: William S. Gilmore; Taylor Hackford
- Starring: Rachel Ward; Jeff Bridges; James Woods; Alex Karras; Jane Greer; Richard Widmark
- Cinematography: Donald E. Thorin
- Edited by: Fredric Steinkamp; William Steinkamp
- Music by: Michel Colombier; Larry Carlton
- Production companies: New Visions; Columbia-Delphi Productions
- Distributed by: Columbia Pictures
- Release date: March 2, 1984
- Running time: 121 minutes
- Country: United States
- Language: English
- Budget: $13 million
- Box office: $21.7 million (domestic only)

Against All Odds is a 1984 American neo noir romantic thriller film directed by Taylor Hackford and starring Rachel Ward, Jeff Bridges and James Woods alongside Jane Greer, Alex Karras, Richard Widmark and Dorian Harewood. The film is an adaptation of the 1946 novel Build My Gallows High by Daniel Mainwaring. The novel was previously adapted as Out of the Past (1947), a film in which Greer played the femme fatale. The film's plot is about an aging American football star who is hired by a mobster to find his girlfriend.

The film's soundtrack, nominated for a Grammy Award, featured songs from Big Country, Kid Creole & the Coconuts, Stevie Nicks and Genesis breakout star, Phil Collins, who wrote and performed the title song, which was nominated for an Academy Award as Best Original Song and for a Golden Globe Award as Best Original Song, as well as winning the Grammy for Best Pop Vocal Performance, Male.

== Plot ==
Professional football player Terry Brogan is released by his team, the Outlaws. Aging, injured and in need of money, he is contacted by an old acquaintance, gambler and nightclub owner Jake Wise. Jake wants Terry to locate his girlfriend, Jessie Wyler, who also happens to be the daughter of Mrs. Wyler, the Outlaws' owner. Terry is reluctant to take on the job, but he needs the money and knows Wise is capable of blackmailing him for a point-shaving incident.

Terry tries to convince Mrs. Wyler and her business partner Ben Caxton to reinstate him on the team. While she expresses no interest in his football career, she offers to pay him more than Jake would if he will instead find Jessie for her.

Hank Sully, the Outlaws team trainer, strongly advises Terry to stay away from Jake and offers to help Terry land a coaching job. Terry decides to work for Jake, but only until he can continue his playing career.

Terry finds Jessie living in Cozumel, Mexico. She rebuffs him as she believes that he has been sent by either Jake or her mother. Terry tires of pursuing her and packs to leave, but Jessie appreciates that he has not revealed her whereabouts. She invites him to her place and they become lovers. Terry confides to her the leverage Jake has over him.

Terry and Jessie remain happily together for a few weeks. Meanwhile, Terry tells Jake he has been unable to locate Jessie. Jake sends Sully to investigate, and he catches the lovers alone at the ruins of Chichen Itza. After a confrontation and struggle between Terry and Sully, Jessie fatally shoots Sully. She wants to flee to avoid jail, but Terry refuses and Jessie quickly abandons him.

After disposing of Sully's body, Terry returns to Los Angeles. There he is astonished to learn that Jessie has returned to Jake. Jake invites Terry to his nightclub, where he tells him that he wants him to break into the office of Steve Kirsch, the Outlaws' corrupt lawyer, who is also involved in Jake's gambling operation. Terry then goes to Jake's house, where Jessie admits both her love for him and the hold Jake now has over her as he discovered that she killed Sully.

Terry breaks into the office only to find Kirsch dead. Terry fights off a security guard, then hides Kirsch's body. He tracks down Kirsch's secretary, Edie, tells her what has happened, and warns that she is also in danger. Edie tells him about a secret box that contains the information to bring down both the entire syndicate and local politicians. They return to the office to retrieve the box.

Jake tells Jessie that he's had Kirsch killed and framed Terry for the murder. She goes to her mother's house and informs Caxton that Jake has been handling bets on his old football team using information from Sully and Kirsch. What she doesn't know is that Caxton is actually Jake's boss at the syndicate.

Caxton takes charge and arranges to meet Terry at the site of a new construction project that he and Mrs. Wyler are backing. Terry is able to disarm Caxton's henchman Tommy. He says his price for turning over the files is that Caxton must take down Jake. Caxton indicates he is receptive to that idea, whereupon Jake pulls his own gun and threatens to kill Jessie, forcing Terry to drop his weapon. While the men are focused on each other, Jessie retrieves the dropped gun and shoots Jake, killing him.

Having killed both Jake and Sully, Jessie must agree to Caxton's terms to avoid going to jail. They include Jessie returning to her estranged mother and ending her relationship with Terry.

Months later, Terry attends a publicity function for Caxton's and Mrs. Wyler's construction project. He wants a last look at Jessie before leaving Los Angeles to resume his football career in Miami. Terry predicts that one day Jessie will break free of the hold that Caxton and Mrs. Wyler have on her. In the meantime, all Terry and Jessie can do is gaze at one another from a distance.

== Cast ==
- Rachel Ward as Jessie Wyler
- Jeff Bridges as Terry Brogan
- James Woods as Jake Wise
- Alex Karras as Hank Sully
- Jane Greer as Mrs. Wyler
- Richard Widmark as Ben Caxton
- Dorian Harewood as Tommy
- Swoosie Kurtz as Edie
- Saul Rubinek as Steve Kirsch
- Pat Corley as Ed Phillips
- Bill McKinney as Head Coach
- Sam Scarber as Assistant Coach

== Production notes ==
- The film featured two cameo appearances by stars of Out of the Past on which the film is based: Jane Greer, who played Kathie Moffat in the first movie, plays Rachel Ward's mother (Greer held the infant Jeff Bridges in 1951's The Company She Keeps in a scene with his real life mother, Dorothy Bridges), and Paul Valentine, who played hood Joe Stephanos in the first movie, played a councilman in Against All Odds.
- Jeff Bridges' age and appearance in this film were used as reference to re-create a 35-year-old version of him for the characters of Kevin Flynn and CLU in the film Tron: Legacy (2010).

== Reception ==
=== Critical response ===
On the review aggregator website Rotten Tomatoes, 63% of 16 critics' reviews are positive, with an average rating of 6.0/10. Metacritic, which uses a weighted average, assigned the film a score of 42 out of 100, based on 10 critics, indicating "mixed or average" reviews.

Roger Ebert of the Chicago Sun-Times gave the film 3 out of 4 stars, saying it dragged in places due to "a lot of plot", but was redeemed by the subtle "social criticism". Janet Maslin of The New York Times highlights the effective contrast of Woods and Bridges.

In 2025, The Hollywood Reporter listed Against All Odds as having the best stunts of 1984.

=== Box office ===
In the United States and Canada, Against All Odds finished No. 2 at the box office in its opening weekend, staying in the top 10 through its first five weeks; overall, it grossed (domestically) $21.7 million at the box office.

=== Accolades ===
Award	Category	Nominee(s)	Result	Ref.
Academy Awards	Best Original Song	"Against All Odds (Take a Look at Me Now)"; Music and Lyrics by Phil Collins	Nominated	
Golden Globe Awards	Best Original Song	"Against All Odds (Take a Look at Me Now)"; Music and Lyrics by Phil Collins	Nominated	
Grammy Awards	Song of the Year	"Against All Odds (Take a Look at Me Now)" – Phil Collins	Nominated	
Grammy Awards	Best Pop Vocal Performance, Male	"Against All Odds (Take a Look at Me Now)" – Phil Collins	Won	
Grammy Awards	Best Album of Original Score Written for a Motion Picture or a Television Special	Against All Odds – Phil Collins, Stevie Nicks, Peter Gabriel, Stuart Adamson, Mike Rutherford, August Darnell, Larry Carlton, and Michel Colombier	Nominated	
Online Film & Television Association Awards	Film Hall of Fame: Songs	"Against All Odds (Take a Look at Me Now)"	Inducted	

== See also ==
- List of American football films
