= Osa Massen =

Danish actress (1914–2006)

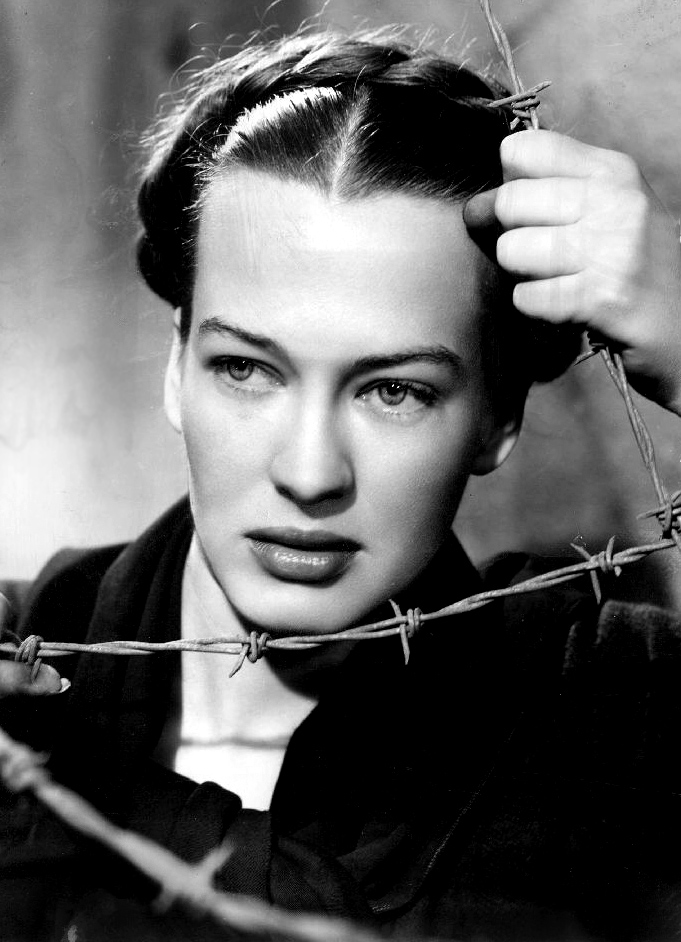
- in The Master Race (1944)
- Born: Aase Madsen Iversen; 13 January 1914; Copenhagen, Denmark
- Died: 2 January 2006 (aged 91); Santa Monica, California, U.S.
- Occupation: Actress
- Years active: 1935–1962
- Spouse(s): Allan Hersholt (1938–1945); Harvey R. Cummins (1947–1951); Dr. Stanley Vogel (1953–1962?)

Osa Massen (born Aase Madsen Iversen, 13 January 1914 – 2 January 2006) was a Danish actress who became a successful movie actress in Hollywood. She became a naturalized citizen of the United States in 1941.

== Background and early career ==
Born in Copenhagen, Denmark, she began her career as a newspaper photographer, then became an actress. She first came to the United States in 1937. She was recorded as Aase Madsen-Iversen, Danish actress, aged 23, on the manifest of the S/S Normandie, which sailed from Southampton, England, on 18 December 1937, and arrived at the Port of New York on 23 December 1937.

Massen's first film was Kidnapped (1935). She notably appeared as Melvyn Douglas' unfaithful wife dealing with blackmailer Joan Crawford in A Woman's Face (1941). She also appeared as a mysterious woman with something to hide in Deadline at Dawn (1946). She also starred with Lloyd Bridges in the movie Rocketship X-M (1950), the first space adventure of the post-World War II era.

Later in her career, Massen appeared in guest roles on many television programs. She made three guest appearances on Perry Mason. In 1958, she played Lisa Bannister in "The Case of the Desperate Daughter", where she was reunited with her "Master Race" daughter Gigi Perreau, and in 1959, she played Sarah Werner in "The Case of the Shattered Dream". Her last television role was in 1962 when she played Lisa Pedersen in "The Case of the Tarnished Trademark".

== Personal life ==
She was married three times, each with a relatively short duration, including once to Allan Hersholt, the son of Jean Hersholt, on 15 December 1938.

== Death ==
Massen died on 2 January 2006, 11 days before her 92nd birthday, following unspecified surgery in Hollywood, California. (Note: The book Obituaries in the Performing Arts, 2006: Film, Television, Radio, Theatre, Dance, Music, Cartoons and Pop Culture says Massen "... died of complications from surgery in a Santa Monica, California, convalescent home ...".) Her remains are buried at Westwood Memorial Park in Los Angeles, California with a plaque that lists her name as Osa Massen Vogel.

== Filmography ==
Year	Title	Role	Notes
1935	Kidnapped	Grethe	
1935	Bag Københavns kulisser	Eva Lindemann	
1939	Honeymoon in Bali	Noel Van Ness	
1941	Honeymoon for Three	Julie Wilson	
1941	A Woman's Face	Vera Segert	
1941	Accent on Love	Osa	
1941	You'll Never Get Rich	Sonya	
1941	The Devil Pays Off	Valeria DeBrock	
1942	Iceland	Helga Jonsdottir	
1943	Background to Danger	Ana Remzi	
1943	Jack London	Freda Maloof	
1943	Undercover	Sailor's Girlfriend	uncredited
1944	The Black Parachute	Marya Orloff	
1944	Cry of the Werewolf	Elsa Chauvet	
1944	The Master Race	Helena	
1946	Tokyo Rose	Greta Norburg	
1946	Deadline at Dawn	Helen Robinson	
1946	The Gentleman Misbehaves	Chincilla	
1946	Strange Journey	Christine Jenner	
1948	Million Dollar Weekend	Cynthia Strong	
1949	Night Unto Night	Lisa	
1950	Rocketship X-M	Dr. Lisa Van Horn	
1955	Wiegenlied	Ernestine Schumann-Heink	
1958	Outcasts of the City	Leda Mueller	
