= Jane Greer =

American actress (1924–2001)

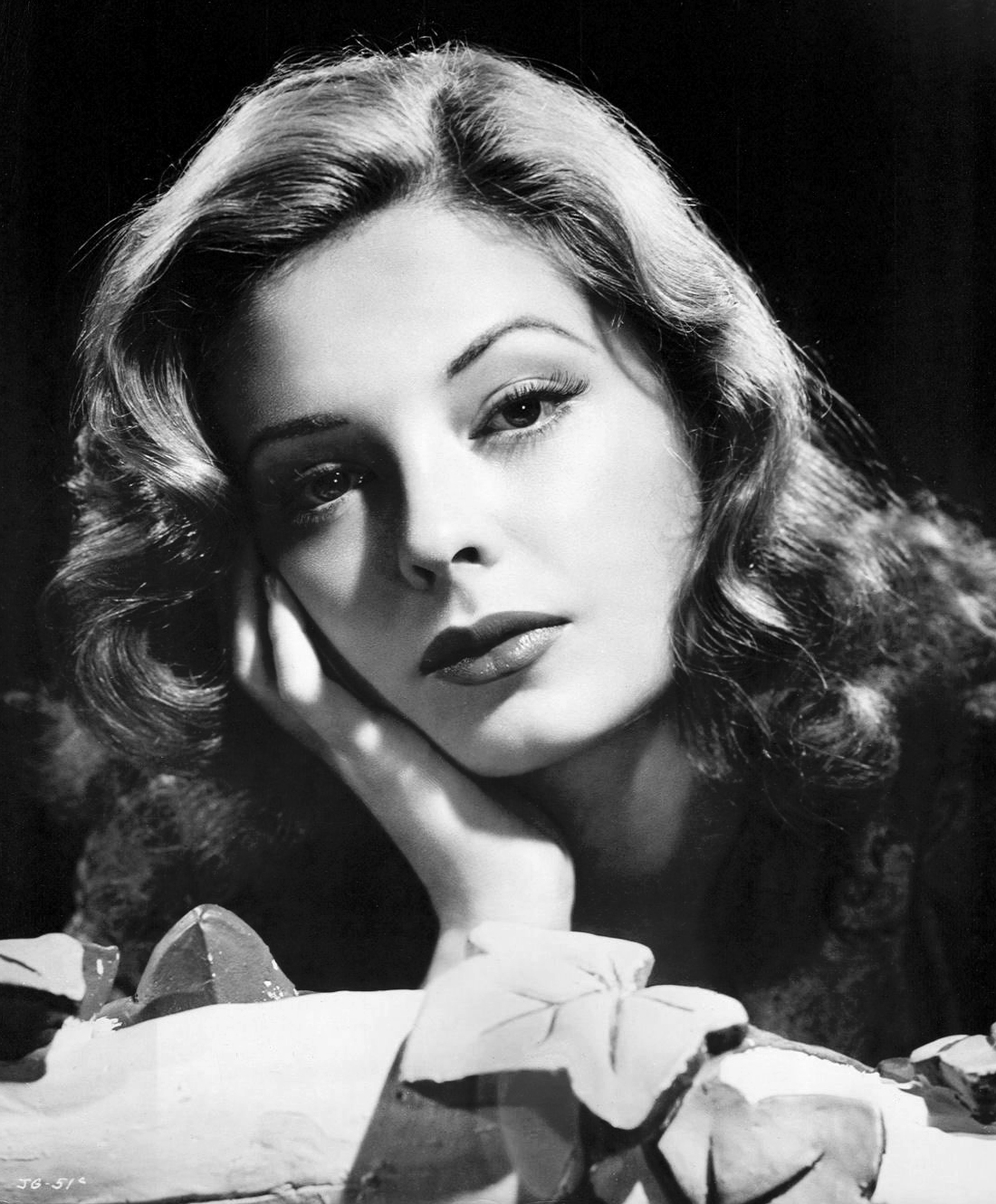
- Publicity photo of Greer for Out of the Past
- Born: Bettejane Greer; September 9, 1924; Washington, D.C., U.S.
- Died: August 24, 2001 (aged 76); Los Angeles, California, U.S.
- Resting place: Westwood Memorial Park
- Occupation: Actress
- Years active: 1945–1996
- Known for: Out of the Past
- Spouses: Rudy Vallée (m. 1943; div. 1944) Edward Lasker (m. 1947; div. 1963)
- Partner: Frank London (1965–2001; his death)
- Children: 3, including Lawrence Lasker
- Awards: Hollywood Walk of Fame

Jane Greer (born Bettejane Greer; September 9, 1924 – August 24, 2001) was an American film and television actress best known for her role as femme fatale Kathie Moffat in the 1947 film noir Out of the Past. In 2009, The Guardian named her one of the best actors never to have received an Academy Award nomination.

== Early life ==
Greer was born in Washington, D.C., the daughter of Charles Durell McClellan Greer Jr. and his wife, Bettie. She had a twin brother Donn, who became an actor and director starting in 1951, after getting out of the service when World War II ended. In 1940, at age 15, Greer suffered from a facial palsy, which paralyzed the left side of her face. She recovered, but the condition may have contributed to her "patented look" and "a calm, quizzical gaze and an enigmatic expression that would later lead RKO to promote her as 'The Woman with the Mona Lisa Smile'." She claimed that the facial exercises used to overcome the paralysis taught her the importance of facial expression in conveying human emotion.

On December 4, 1945, Greer had her name legally changed to Jane Greer by a court in Los Angeles. She said of her previous name: "Mine is a sissy name. It's too bo-peepish, ingenueish, for the type of role I've been playing. It's like Mary Lou or Mary Ann."

== Career ==
=== Music ===
A beauty-contest winner and professional model from her teens, Greer began her show-business career as a big-band singer. She sang in Washington, D.C., with the orchestra of Enric Madriguera. She "sang phonetically in Spanish" with the group.

=== Film ===
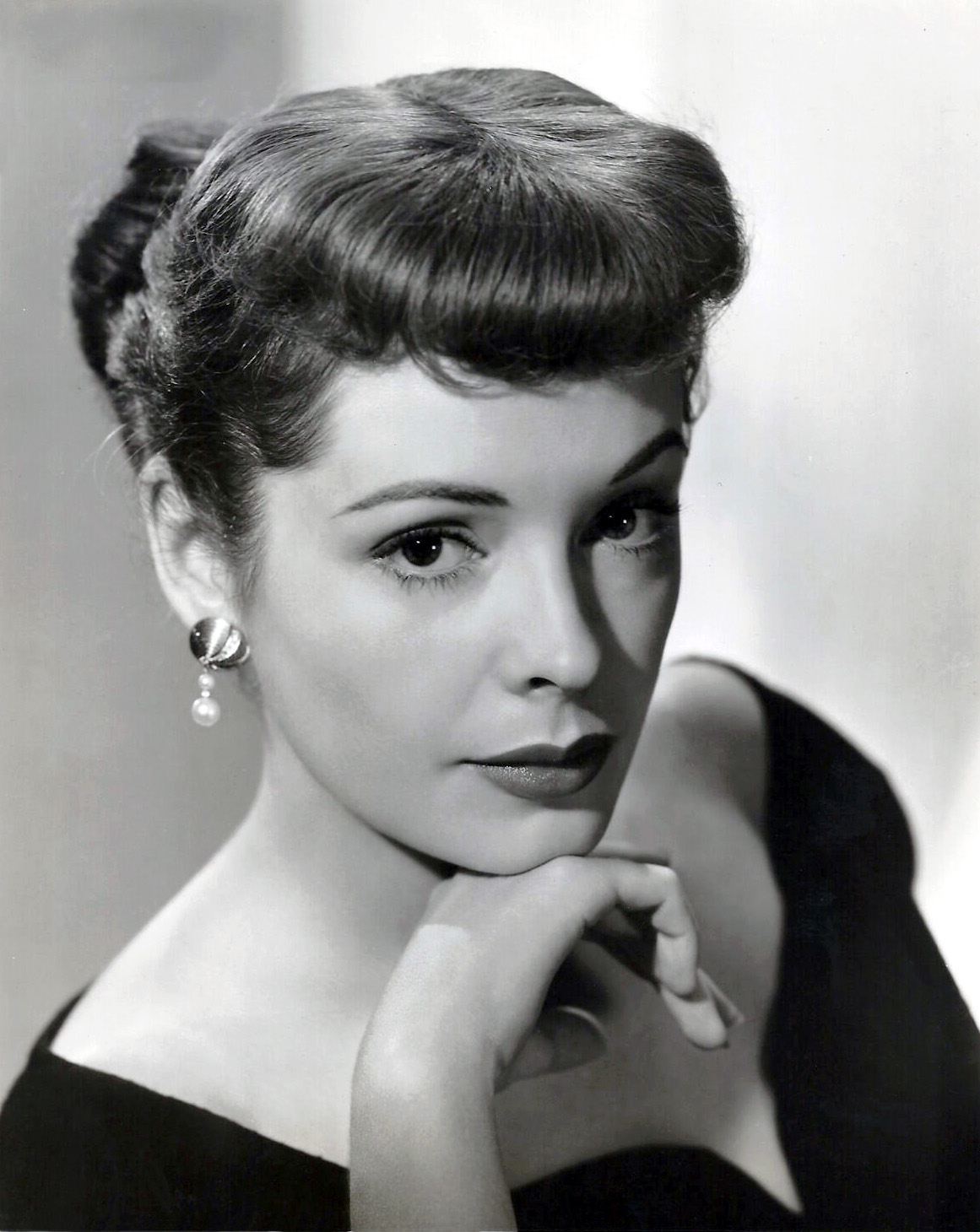
Greer in a 1940s publicity photo

Howard Hughes spotted Greer modeling in the June 8, 1942, issue of Life, and sent her to Hollywood to become an actress. Hughes lent her to RKO to star in many films (another source says Greer's husband, Rudy Vallee, "helped her get out of her contract with Hughes and secure another pact with RKO Studios") including Dick Tracy (1945), Out of the Past (1947), They Won't Believe Me (1947), and the comedy/suspense film The Big Steal (1949), with Out of the Past co-star Robert Mitchum. Hughes refused to let her work for a time; when she finally resumed film acting, she appeared in You're in the Navy Now (1951), The Prisoner of Zenda (1952), Run for the Sun (1956), and Man of a Thousand Faces (1957). In 1984, she was cast in Against All Odds, a remake of Out of the Past, as the mother of the character she had played in 1947. In 1952, Greer obtained a release from her contract with Metro-Goldwyn-Mayer Studios. She said, "When there is a good role at MGM, the producers want Lana or Ava. There is no chance for another actress to develop into important stardom at the studio."

=== Television ===
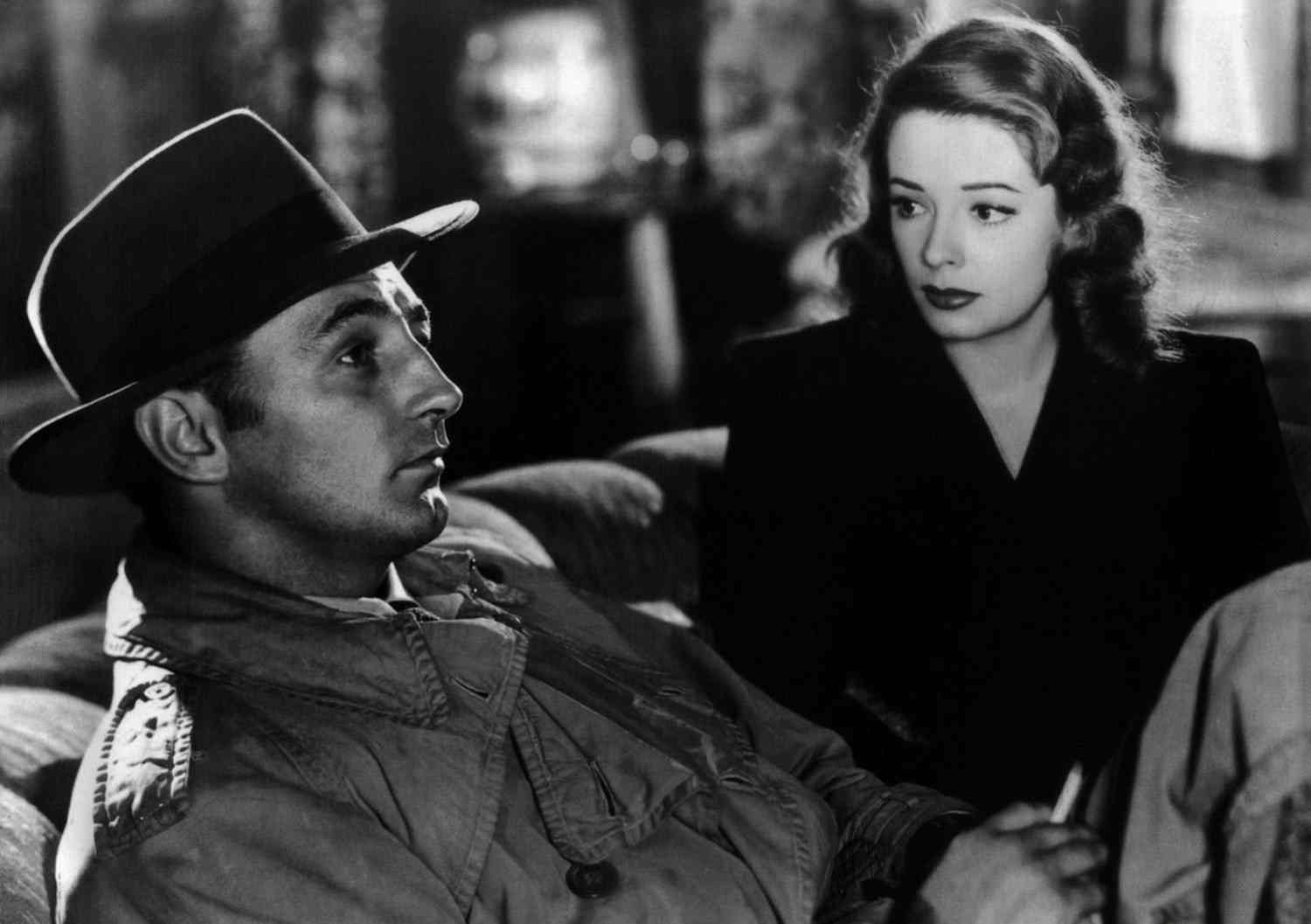
With Robert Mitchum in Out of the Past

Greer's noteworthy roles in television included guest appearances on episodes of numerous shows over the decades, such as Alfred Hitchcock Presents, Bonanza, Quincy, M.E., Murder, She Wrote, and a 1975 role with Peter Falk and Robert Vaughn in an episode of Columbo titled Troubled Waters. She even got to make fun of Out of the Past in a parody with Robert Mitchum on TV's Saturday Night Live in 1987. Greer joined the casts of Falcon Crest in 1984 and Twin Peaks in 1990 in recurring roles until her retirement in 1996.

== Recognition ==
Greer was honored with a star on the Hollywood Walk of Fame at 1634 Vine Street for her contributions to the motion picture industry. The star was dedicated on February 8, 1960.

== Personal life and death ==
Greer married Rudy Vallée on December 2, 1943, in Hollywood, but they separated after three months and divorced on July 27, 1944. On August 20, 1947, Greer married Edward Lasker, a Los Angeles lawyer and businessman, with whom she had three sons: Alex, a screenwriter and author, Lawrence, a movie producer (WarGames, Sneakers), and Steven, a two time Grammy Award winner. Greer and Lasker divorced in 1963. Frank London (an actor and dialogue coach) was Greer's domestic partner from 1965 until his death in 2001, six months before Greer died. Greer was Catholic.

Despite her family's deep roots in the Democratic Party—her grandfather, Charles McLean Greer Sr., was a prominent Tennessee Democrat who served as Speaker of the State Senate—Greer's personal politics shifted significantly later in life. A registered Democrat, she voted for Jimmy Carter in the 1976 presidential election. However, she grew deeply dissatisfied with his administration, eventually concluding that Carter "wasn't up to the job" as she had originally believed. This disappointment prompted her to break from her party affiliation to cross party lines and actively campaign for and vote for Republican Ronald Reagan during both his 1980 and 1984 presidential bids.

Greer died of cancer on August 24, 2001, at the age of 76, in Bel Air, Los Angeles.

== Complete filmography ==
Year	Film	Role	Director	Notes
1945	Pan-Americana	Miss Downing	John H. Auer	Uncredited
1945	Two O'Clock Courage	Helen Carter	Anthony Mann	as Bettejane Greer
1945	George White's Scandals	Billie Randall	Felix E. Feist	as Bettejane Greer
1945	Dick Tracy	Judith Owens	William A. Berke	
1946	The Falcon's Alibi	Lola Carpenter	Ray McCarey	
1946	Sunset Pass	Lolita Baxter	William Berke	
1946	The Bamboo Blonde	Eileen Sawyer	Anthony Mann	
1947	Sinbad the Sailor	Pirouze	Richard Wallace	
1947	They Won't Believe Me	Janice Bell	Irving Pichel	
1947	Out of the Past	Kathie Moffat	Jacques Tourneur	
1948	Station West	Charlie	Sidney Lanfield	
1949	The Big Steal	Joan Graham	Don Siegel	
1951	The Company She Keeps	Diane Stuart	John Cromwell	
1951	You're in the Navy Now	Ellie C. Harkness	Henry Hathaway	
1952	You for Me	Katie McDermad	Don Weis	
1952	The Prisoner of Zenda	Antoinette de Mauban	Richard Thorpe	
1952	Desperate Search	Julie Heldon	Joseph H. Lewis	
1953	The Clown	Paula Henderson	Robert Z. Leonard	
1953	Down Among the Sheltering Palms	Diana Forrester	Edmund Goulding	
1956	Run for the Sun	Katherine "Katie" Connors	Roy Boulting	
1957	Man of a Thousand Faces	Hazel Bennet Chaney	Joseph Pevney	
1964	Where Love Has Gone	Marian Spicer	Edward Dmytryk	
1965	Billie	Agnes Carol	Don Weis	
1973	The Outfit	Alma Macklin	John Flynn	
1979	A Christmas for Boomer		William Asher	TV movie
1982	The Shadow Riders	Ma Traven	Andrew V. McLaglen	TV movie
1984	Against All Odds	Mrs. Wyler	Taylor Hackford	
1986	Just Between Friends	Ruth Chadwick	Allan Burns	
1989	Immediate Family	Michael's Mother	Jonathan Kaplan	
1996	Perfect Mate	Mom	Karl Armstrong	Independent film

== Partial television credits ==
- The Ford Television Theatre – "Look for Tomorrow" (1953), "One Man Missing (1955)", "Moment of Decision" (1957)
- Celebrity Playhouse – "Diamonds in the Sky" (1955) as Nina
- Dick Powell's Zane Grey Theatre – "A Gun for My Bride" (1957), "The Vaunted" (1958), "Stagecoach to Yuma" (1960)
- Playhouse 90 – "No Time at All" (1958) as Karen
- Alfred Hitchcock Presents (1959) (Season 4 Episode 34: "A True Account") as Mrs. Cannon-Hughes / Ms. Cannon-Hughes / Mrs. Cannon-Hughes-Brett
- Bonanza – "The Julia Bulette Story" (1959) as Julia Bulette
- Stagecoach West – "High Lonesome" (1960) as Kathleen Kane
- Thriller – "Portrait Without a Face" (1961) as Ann Moffat
- Burke's Law – "Who Killed My Girl?" (1964) as Lonnie Smith
- Columbo – "Troubled Waters" (1975) as Sylvia Danziger
- Quincy, M.E. – "The Depth of Beauty" (1979) as Dorrie Larkin
- Falcon Crest (1984) as Charlotte Pershing (recurring role, 6 episodes)
- The Law & Harry McGraw – "Murder by Landslide" (1987) as Augusta Stillman
- Saturday Night Live – "Robert Mitchum/Simply Red" (1987) as Kathy (uncredited)
- Murder, She Wrote – "The Last Flight of the Dixie Damsel" (1988) as Bonnie Phelps
- Twin Peaks (1990) as Vivian Smythe Niles
