= Daniel Mainwaring =

American novelist and screenwriter (1902–1977)

- Born: February 27, 1902; Oakland, California, U.S.
- Died: January 31, 1977 (aged 74); Los Angeles, California, U.S.
- Resting place: Clovis Cemetery, Clovis, California, U.S.
- Occupations: Novelist; screenwriter
- Writing career
- Pen name: Geoffrey Homes
- Genre: Mystery fiction

Daniel Mainwaring (February 27, 1902 – January 31, 1977) was an American novelist and screenwriter. His novel Build My Gallows High (1946) was adapted to film by himself as Out of the Past (1947).

== Biography ==
A native of Oakland, California, Mainwaring began his professional career as a journalist for the San Francisco Chronicle and enjoyed a successful career as a mystery novelist (under the name Geoffrey Homes). He worked as a film publicist and eventually abandoned fiction for a successful career as a screenwriter.

His first novel (and the only one he ever published under his own name), One Against the Earth (1932), is a proletarian novel about a young man born on a California ranch who becomes a drifter and is eventually unjustly accused of attacking a child. He made his real mark, however, with a string of hard-boiled mystery novels (mostly with small-town California settings), the first of which was The Man Who Murdered Himself (1936).

His final published novel, Build My Gallows High (William Morrow & Co., 1946), is generally regarded as his best—and its adaptation (by "Homes" himself) into the 1947 film noir classic Out of the Past assured his place in film history. Mainwaring explained to interviewer Pat McGilligan that he regarded the novel as a departure from his earlier literary efforts:

With Build My Gallows High, I wanted to get away from straight mystery novels. Those detective stories are a bore to write. You've got to figure out "whodunit". I'd get to the end and have to say whodunit and be so mixed up I couldn't decide myself.

By the time Out of the Past appeared Mainwaring had already begun to devote himself exclusively to screenwriting, first under the Homes pseudonym and later under his real name. Other notable credits during this period include The Big Steal (1949, directed by Don Siegel) and This Woman Is Dangerous (1952, with Joan Crawford). His first important film works bearing his real name were the 1954 shot-on-location crime thriller The Phenix City Story (1954) and the original version of Invasion of the Body Snatchers (1956).

As director Joseph Losey, whose The Lawless was adapted by Mainwaring from the writer's own short story (publication undetermined) "The Voice of Stephen Wilder", noted:

This is one of the things that makes me very close to Dan Mainwaring—his experience of Americana, the nostalgia of the good things about small towns. I remember the smell of burning leaves at night in the autumn too. And I remember the smell of Christmas, the sparkle in the air at football games, and the sound of distant trains. And Dan remembers them all. He's a much underrated writer and he's a really quite noble man. He damaged himself with drink and he was very badly hurt by the blacklist.

According to Frank Krutnik's book "Un-American" Hollywood, Losey's memory seems to serve him wrong here. Mainwaring's widow claims her husband actually acted as a front for blacklisted author Paul Jarrico. Also, Mainwaring's name appears on several movie credits in the 1950s which would have been impossible for a blacklisted author. The first film to break the blacklisting rule by naming a "banned" screenwriter (Dalton Trumbo) in the credits was Otto Preminger's 1960 film, Exodus.

In 1960, Mainwaring was hired by fantasy-film producer-director George Pal to write the screenplay for the MGM Studios film Atlantis, the Lost Continent, released in 1961. He based his script on a play written by Gerald Hargreaves in 1945. Toward the end of his career, in the 1960s, he wrote for TV shows like The Wild Wild West and Mannix. He did not live long enough to see Out of the Past remade as Against All Odds (1984).
