= Out of the Past =

1947 American film noir by Jacques Tourneur

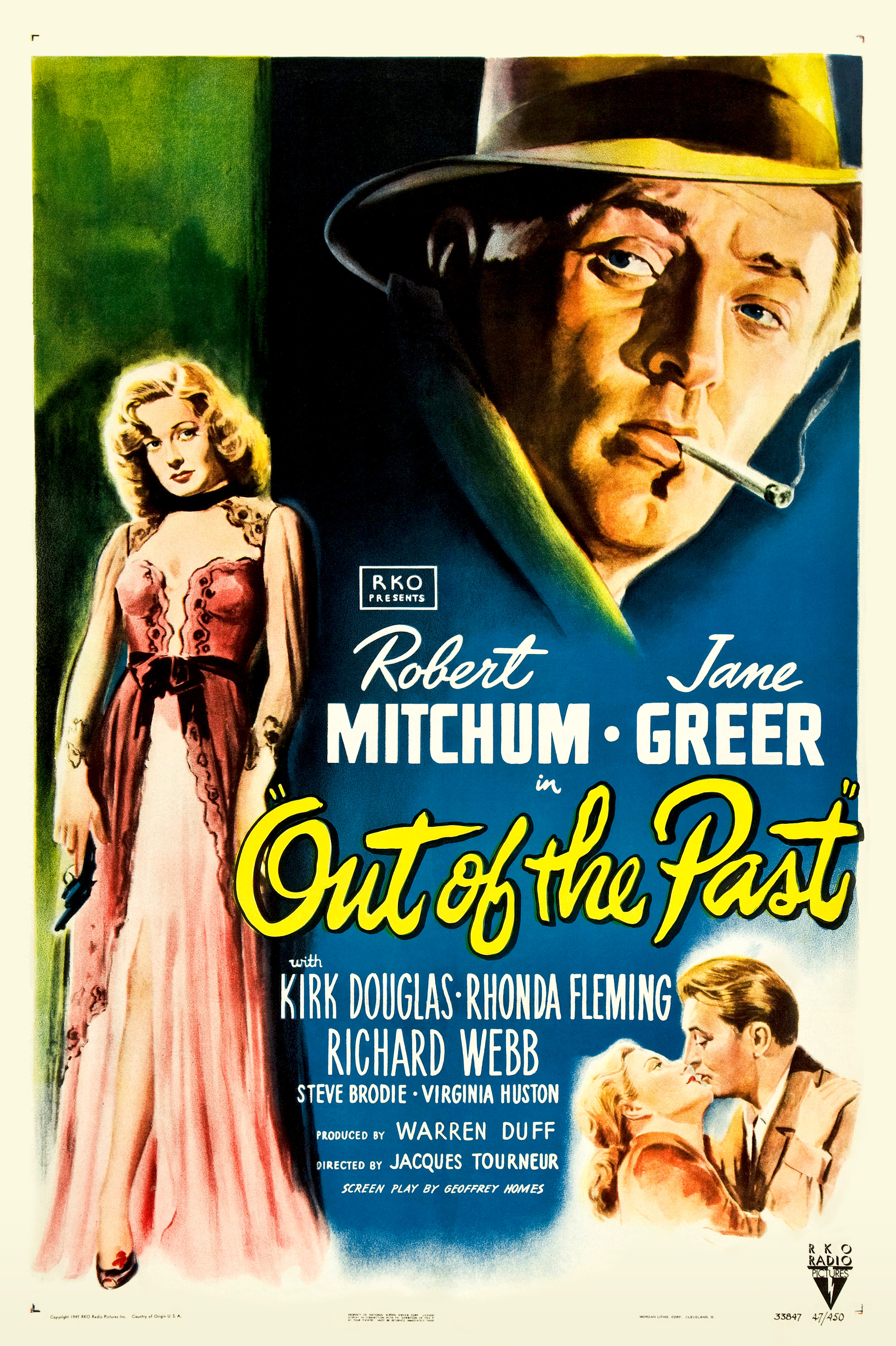
- Theatrical release poster by William Rose
- Directed by: Jacques Tourneur
- Screenplay by: Geoffrey Homes (Daniel Mainwaring); James M. Cain (uncredited); Frank Fenton; (uncredited)
- Based on: Build My Gallows High; 1946 novel by Daniel Mainwaring
- Produced by: Warren Duff
- Starring: Robert Mitchum; Jane Greer; Kirk Douglas; Rhonda Fleming; Richard Webb; Steve Brodie; Virginia Huston
- Cinematography: Nicholas Musuraca
- Edited by: Samuel E. Beetley
- Music by: Roy Webb
- Production company: RKO Radio Pictures
- Distributed by: RKO Radio Pictures
- Release date: November 25, 1947 (USA)
- Running time: 97 minutes
- Country: United States
- Language: English

Out of the Past (billed in the United Kingdom as Build My Gallows High) is a 1947 American film noir by director Jacques Tourneur and starring Robert Mitchum, Jane Greer and Kirk Douglas. The film was adapted by Geoffrey Homes (Daniel Mainwaring) from his 1946 novel Build My Gallows High (also written as Homes), with uncredited revisions by Frank Fenton and James M. Cain.

Out of the Past is considered one of the greatest films noirs. Its complex, fatalistic storyline, dark cinematography and classic femme fatale garnered the film critical acclaim and cult status. In 1991, the National Film Preservation Board at the Library of Congress selected Out of the Past for preservation to the United States National Film Registry as being “culturally, historically, or aesthetically significant” along with 24 other films.

== Plot ==
Joe Stefanos drives to the rural mountain town of Bridgeport, California to seek gas station owner Jeff Bailey, and asks him to meet Whit Sterling in Lake Tahoe. Jeff acquiesces and takes his girlfriend Ann Miller to ride along and hear about his past.

Jeff reveals that his real surname is Markham, and three years ago he was partners with Jack Fisher in New York City as private eyes. Gambling kingpin Whit hired Jeff to track down Whit's girlfriend Kathie Moffat, who shot Whit and stole $40,000 from him. Jeff tracks Kathie to Acapulco, and is struck by her seductive beauty. Kathie admits to shooting Whit, but denies stealing. Jeff and Kathie quickly fall in love; when Whit and Stefanos arrives unannounced to check on Jeff's progress, Jeff lies and says he never found her. Jeff and Kathie then escape to San Francisco and live there for several months before Fisher tracks them down to a mountain cabin. There, Fisher and Jeff brawl before Kathie shoots Fisher dead and runs away, leaving behind a bankbook revealing a $40,000 deposit.

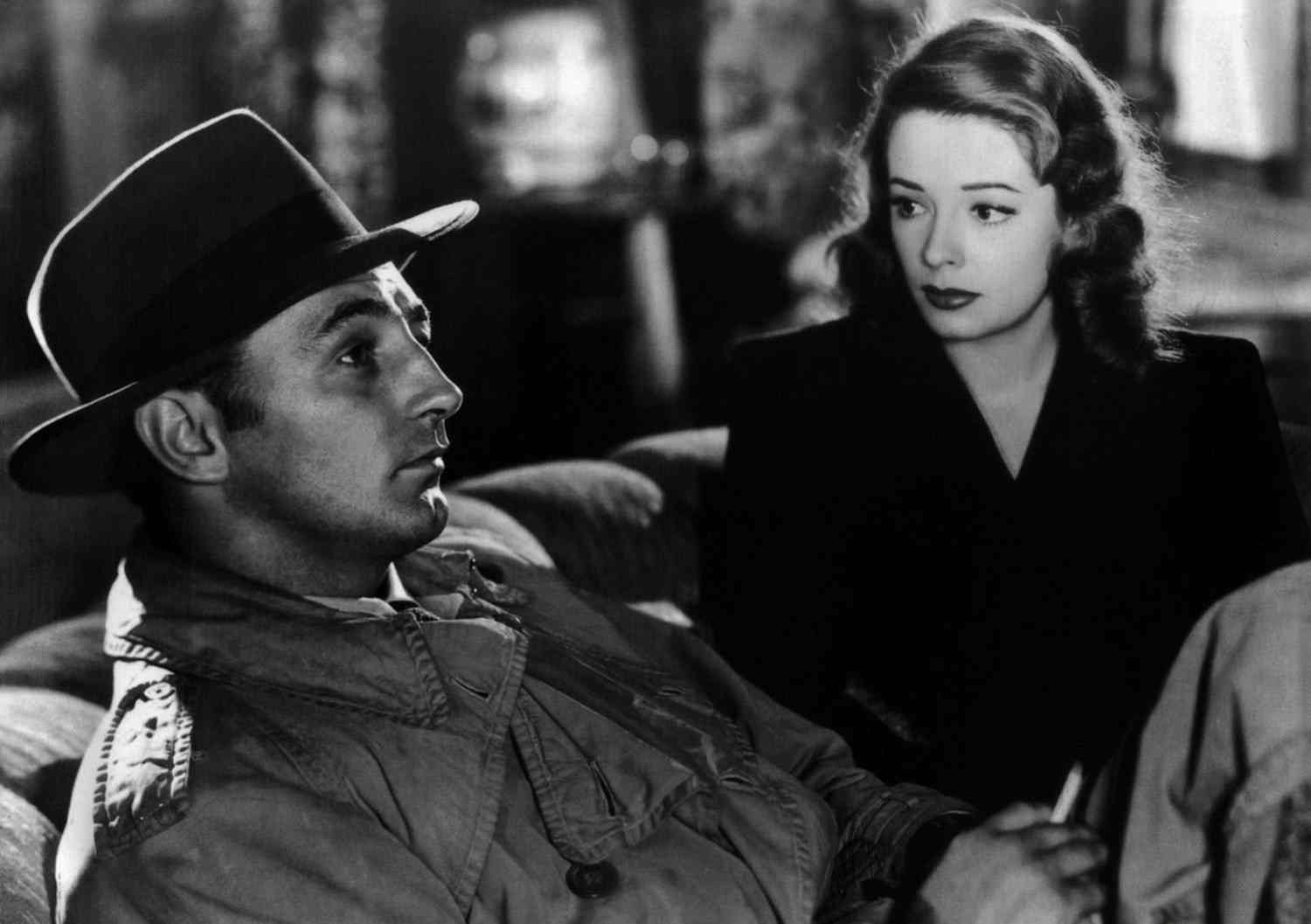
Jeff Bailey (Mitchum) and Kathie Moffat (Greer)

Ann drops Jeff off at Whit's estate, where Whit inveigles Jeff into a job to clear their slate. Jeff is surprised to see Kathie there as Whit's lover again, but she claims she had no choice but to return. She indicates that Whit knows about their time together but nothing about Fisher's murder. Jeff scornfully rejects her.

Whit explains that San Francisco lawyer Leonard Eels has helped him dodge $1,000,000 in taxes but is now blackmailing him. Whit orders Jeff to meet with Eels's secretary, Meta Carson, who explains the plan to recover the incriminating records. Suspecting a frame, Jeff still joins her at Eels's apartment. He trails Meta, who retrieves the records from Eels' office. Jeff returns to Eels's apartment to find Eels dead; he hides the body.

Jeff sneaks into Meta's apartment and overhears Kathie arranging for the discovery of Eels's body; she is surprised to learn it can't be found. Jeff confronts Kathie, who claims she signed an affidavit for Whit swearing that Jeff killed Fisher. She suggests rekindling their romance and he leaves. Stefanos arrives, assuring Kathie that he killed Eels. Jeff retrieves the tax records as collateral for getting the affidavit. Kathie and Meta are unable to retrieve the affidavit from Eels' office as the police are already there. Whit's thugs capture Jeff but discovers he no longer has the records, as Jeff had already mailed them to himself.

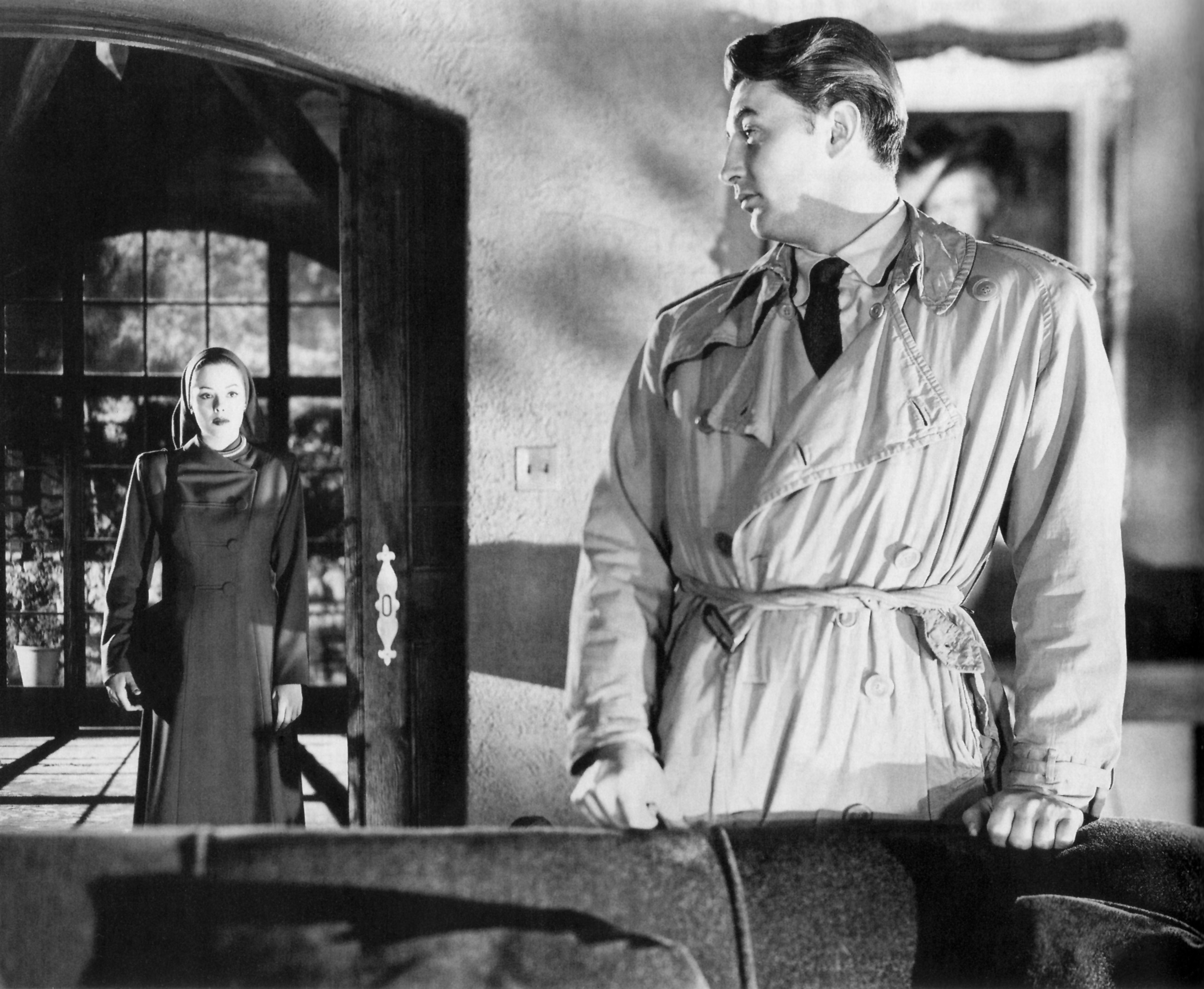
Kathie and Jeff at the Lake Tahoe mansion

Wanted for the murders of Fisher and Eels, Jeff hides out in Bridgeport. Kathie directs Stefanos to trail Jeff's deaf-mute gas station helper, which leads to a gorge where Jeff is hiding. The kid pulls Stefanos with a fishing line to his death before he can shoot Jeff. Jeff informs Whit about Stefanos' death as well as Kathie's double-cross, and offers to return the records if Whit destroys Kathie's affidavit and surrenders her to police for Fisher's murder. Whit accepts, threatening to kill Kathie if she does not cooperate.

Jim, Ann's childhood friend and former beau, trails Jeff to a meeting with Ann. Ann believes in Jeff's innocence but asks if he is absolutely sure of what he wants. He says he is, and she promises to wait for him. Jeff returns to Whit's mansion and discovers that he has been killed by Kathie, who insists Jeff run away with her or be framed for all three murders. While she packs, Jeff makes a phone call. As Jeff drives them away, Kathie realizes that he has arranged a police roadblock. She shoots him dead and is then gunned down by the police.

In Bridgeport, Jim asks Ann to leave town with him, but Ann demurs. Privately, she asks the kid if Jeff was going away with Kathie. After a pause, he nods disingenuously. A heartbroken Ann gets into Jim's car, and the kid waves a wistful farewell at Jeff's name on his garage sign.

== Cast ==
- Robert Mitchum as Jeff Bailey, previously known as Jeff Markham
- Jane Greer as Kathie Moffat
- Kirk Douglas as Whit Sterling
- Rhonda Fleming as Meta Carson
- Richard Webb as Jim
- Steve Brodie as Jack Fisher
- Virginia Huston as Ann Miller
- Paul Valentine as Joe Stefanos
- Dickie Moore as The Kid
- Ken Niles as Leonard Eels

== Production ==
Daniel Mainwaring wrote Build My Gallows High in 1946 while on retreat after writing six screenplays in one year. He had also tired of detective fiction, having written several novels featuring a sleuthing reporter named Robin Bishop. The title for the novel originated in a poem, believed by one scholar to be "Haman" from Benjamin Cutler Clark's The Past, Present, and Future (1867). The poem is about Haman's machinations and includes the line, "At length a gallows high he swung, upon which all were to be hung..."

A script reader at RKO Pictures recommended the novel as a "worthy addition to the rough, tough school of Chandler, Cain and Burnett...presents an almost perfect story for an actor like Bogart". William Dozier approved the purchase for $20,000, which included Mainwaring as screenwriter. Gallup's Audience Research recommended that RKO change the title to Out of the Past. Warren Duff was unsure about Mainwaring's first draft. One of the problems was that The Kid narrated the film, which convoluted the structure. Duff paid James M. Cain $20,000 to rewrite it, but the second draft was so flawed that Duff hired Mainwaring again to finish the screenplay.

Out of the Past was produced by RKO Pictures. Key personnel—director Jacques Tourneur, cinematographer Nicholas Musuraca, actor Mitchum, and Albert S. D'Agostino's design group—were all long-time RKO collaborators. Although the studio focused on making B-films during the early 1940s, the post–World War II Out of the Past was afforded a comparatively lavish budget.

John Garfield and Dick Powell declined the lead role. Kirk Douglas appears in his third credited screen performance, having made his critically noted debut in 1946's The Strange Love of Martha Ivers. The next time that Mitchum and Douglas played major roles in the same picture occurred in the 1967 Western The Way West.

== Reception ==
Out of the Past is considered one of the greatest of all films noir. Robert Ottoson hailed the film in 1981 as "the ne plus ultra of forties film noir". In a contemporary review, The New York Times film critic Bosley Crowther complimented the crime drama's direction and performances, although he did find the latter portion of the screenplay hard to follow:

...it's very snappy and quite intriguingly played by a cast that has been well and smartly directed by Jacques Tourneur. Robert Mitchum is magnificently cheeky and self-assured as the tangled 'private eye,' consuming an astronomical number of cigarettes in displaying his nonchalance. And Jane Greer is very sleek as his Delilah, Kirk Douglas is crisp as a big crook and Richard Webb, Virginia Huston, Rhonda Fleming and Dickie Moore are picturesque in other roles. If only we had some way of knowing what's going on in the last half of this film, we might get more pleasure from it. As it is, the challenge is worth a try.

The staff of the widely read trade publication Variety also gave it a positive review upon release:

Out of the Past is a hardboiled melodrama [from the novel by Geoffrey Homes] strong on characterization. Direction by Jacques Tourneur pays close attention to mood development, achieving realistic flavor that is further emphasized by real life settings and topnotch lensing by Nicholas Musuraca...Mitchum gives a very strong account of himself. Jane Greer as the baby-faced, charming killer is another lending potent interest. Kirk Douglas, the gangster, is believable and Paul Valentine makes his role of henchman stand out. Rhonda Fleming is in briefly but effectively."

In The Nation in 1948, James Agee wrote, "Out of the Past is a medium-grade thriller ... Fairly well played, and very well photographed ... the action develops a routine kind of pseudo-tension ... Robert Mitchum is so very sleepily self-confident with the women that when he slopes into clinches you expect him to snore in their faces."

In his 2004 assessment of the film for the Chicago Sun-Times, critic Roger Ebert noted:

Out of the Past is one of the greatest of all film noirs, the story of a man who tries to break with his past and his weakness and start over again in a town, with a new job and a new girl. The film stars Robert Mitchum, whose weary eyes and laconic voice, whose very presence as a violent man wrapped in indifference, made him an archetypal noir actor. The story opens before we've even seen him, as trouble comes to town looking for him. A man from his past has seen him pumping gas, and now his old life reaches out and pulls him back.

With regard to the production's stylish and moody cinematography, Ebert also dubbed the film "The greatest cigarette-smoking movie of all time."

...The trick, as demonstrated by Jacques Tourneur and his cameraman, Nicholas Musuraca, is to throw a lot of light into the empty space where the characters are going to exhale. When they do, they produce great white clouds of smoke, which express their moods, their personalities and their energy levels. There were guns in Out of the Past, but the real hostility came when Robert Mitchum and Kirk Douglas smoked at each other.

In a 1989 review, Leslie Halliwell gave it two of four stars, stating: "Moody film noir with Hollywood imitating French models; plenty of snarling and a death-strewn climax." Pauline Kael wrote in 1991, "A thin but well-shot suspense melodrama ... It's empty trash, but you do keep watching it." TCM Noir Alley host and author Eddie Muller lauded the film in 2021: "Mainwaring's serpentine story is all about mood and movement, dreamily winding its way through various locations, shifting rhythms, seducing the audience toward the black hole at its heart. It nailed the bull's-eye and its reverberations linger after repeated viewings: guilt, duplicity, self-deception, and the lonely hero's need to push it to the bitter end, tempting fate once too often."

The film holds a score of 88% on review aggregation website Rotten Tomatoes, based on 88 reviews. Its consensus summarizes: "Anchored by a wistful Robert Mitchum, Out of the Past is an exemplary noir steeped in doom and sensuality." Metacritic, which uses a weighted average, assigned the film a score of 85 out of 100, based on 40 critics, indicating "universal acclaim".

== Box office ==
The film earned a profit of $90,000.

== Adaptations ==
Out of the Past was remade as Against All Odds (1984) with Rachel Ward in the Greer role, Jeff Bridges playing the Jeff Markham- inspired role, and James Woods as a variation of Kirk Douglas' villain, with Jane Greer as the mother of her original character in Out of the Past and Richard Widmark in a supporting role.

On November 14, 1987, Mitchum guest hosted Saturday Night Live. Greer made a surprise appearance in a gag sequel called "Out of Gas," in which their characters met again 40 years later at a filling station.

== See also ==
- List of cult films
