= Gene Tierney =

American actress (1920–1991)

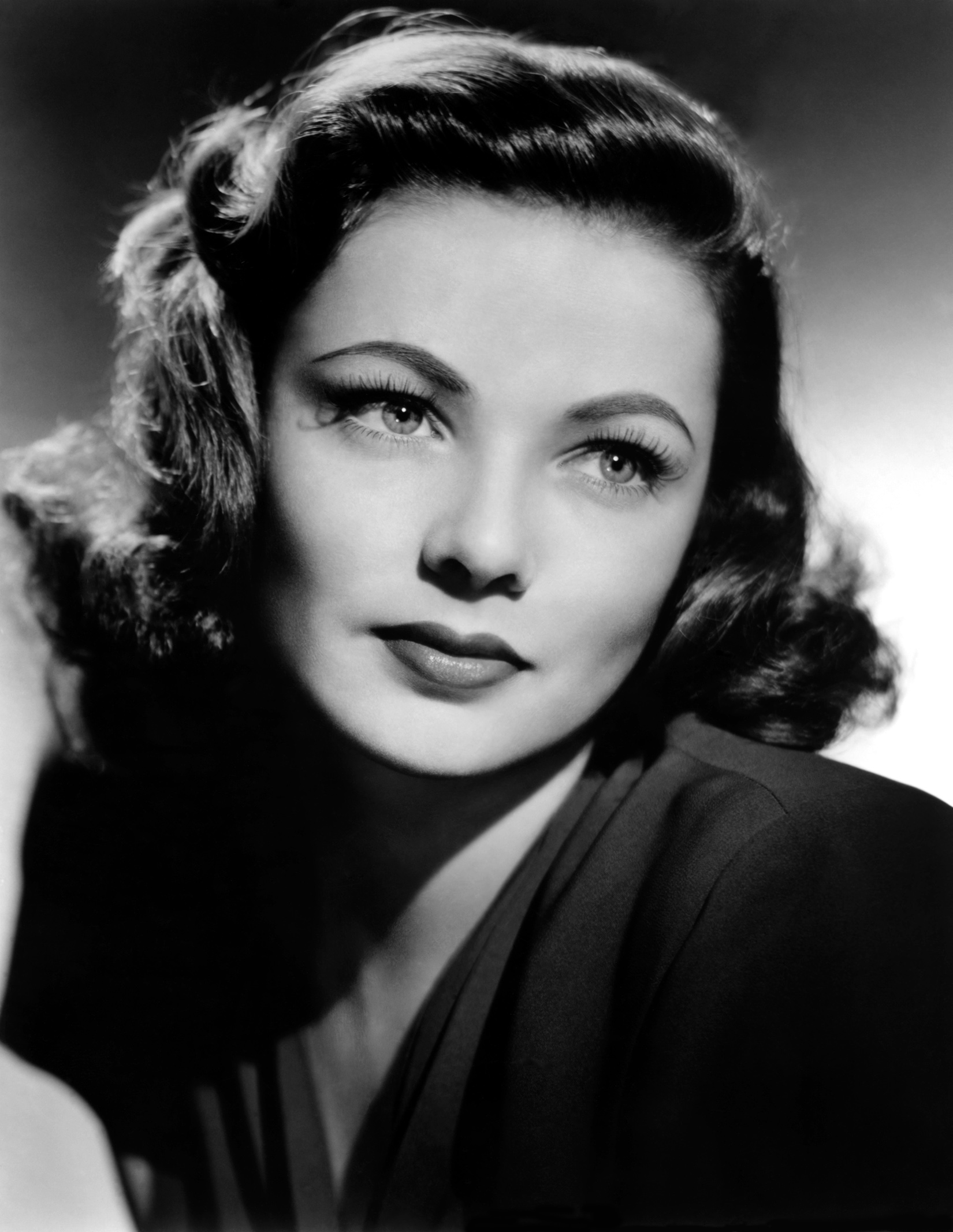
- Tierney in the 1940s
- Born: Gene Eliza Tierney; November 19, 1920; New York City, U.S.
- Died: November 6, 1991 (aged 70); Houston, Texas, U.S.
- Resting place: Glenwood Cemetery, Houston, Texas, U.S.
- Occupation: Actress
- Years active: 1938–1980
- Political party: Republican
- Spouses: Oleg Cassini (m. 1941; div. 1952); W. Howard Lee (m. 1960; died 1981)
- Children: 2
- Awards: Donostia Award; Hollywood Walk of Fame

Gene Eliza Tierney (November 19, 1920 – November 6, 1991) was an American stage and film actress. Tierney was a prominent leading lady during the Golden Age of Hollywood. She starred as Laura Hunt in Otto Preminger's Laura (1944), a film noir classic, and as Ellen Berent in John M. Stahl's Leave Her to Heaven (1945), which earned her a nomination for the Academy Award for Best Actress. Darryl F. Zanuck, co-founder of 20th Century Fox, said Tierney was "unquestionably, the most beautiful woman in movie history."

Tierney was a 20th Century Fox contract player who did much of her work for the studio. She starred in many commercially successful Fox films, including The Return of Frank James (1940; her film debut), Tobacco Road (1941), Son of Fury: The Story of Benjamin Blake (1942), Heaven Can Wait (1943), A Bell for Adano (1945), The Razor's Edge (1946), The Ghost and Mrs. Muir (1947), The Iron Curtain (1948), Whirlpool and Night and the City (both 1950), The Mating Season (1951), On the Riviera (1951), The Egyptian (1954), The Left Hand of God (1955), and The Pleasure Seekers (1964; her last film role). After her Hollywood career began to decline, Tierney made sporadic appearances on many television shows. Her role in the miniseries Scruples (1980), marked her last work credit.

== Early life ==
Tierney was born in Brooklyn, New York, the daughter of Howard Sherwood Tierney and Belle Lavinia Tierney (née Taylor). She was named after a beloved uncle, who died young. She had an elder brother and a younger sister. Her father was a successful insurance broker of Irish descent on his paternal side; their mother was a former physical education instructor.

She attended St. Margaret's School for Girls in Waterbury, Connecticut (which merged into what became Chase Collegiate School) and Unquowa School in Fairfield, Connecticut. Tierney spent two years in Europe, attending Brillantmont International School in Lausanne, Switzerland, where she learned to speak fluent French. She returned to the US in 1936 and attended Miss Porter's School in Farmington, Connecticut. On a family trip to the West Coast, she visited Warner Bros. studios, where her mother's cousin worked as a producer of historical short films. Director Anatole Litvak, taken by the 17-year-old's beauty, told Tierney that she should become an actress. Warner Bros. wanted to sign her to a contract, but her parents advised against it because of the relatively low salary; they also wanted her to take her position in society.

Tierney's society debut occurred on September 24, 1938, when she was 17 years old. Quickly bored with society life, she decided to pursue an acting career. Her father said, "If Gene is to be an actress, it should be in the legitimate theatre." Tierney studied acting at a small Greenwich Village acting studio in New York with Broadway actor/director Benno Schneider who was a prominent director and acting coach who studied in Russia under Konstantin Stanislavsky and Evgeny Vakhtangov. He brought this foundational approach to the United States, famously teaching early psychological realism and character immersion. She also became a protégée of Broadway producer-director George Abbott.

== Career ==
=== Broadway ===
In Tierney's first role on Broadway, she carried a bucket of water across the stage in What a Life! (1938). A Variety magazine critic declared, "Miss Tierney is certainly the most beautiful water carrier I've ever seen!" She also worked as an understudy in The Primrose Path (1938).

The following year, she appeared in the role of Molly O'Day in the Broadway production Mrs. O'Brien Entertains (1939). New York Times critic Brooks Atkinson wrote, "As an Irish maiden fresh from the old country, Gene Tierney in her first stage performance is very pretty and refreshingly modest." That same year, Tierney appeared as Peggy Carr in Ring Two (1939) to favorable reviews. Theater critic Richard Watts Jr. of the New York Herald Tribune wrote, "I see no reason why Miss Tierney should not have an interesting theatrical career – that is, if cinema does not kidnap her away."

Tierney's father set up a corporation, Belle-Tier, to fund and promote her acting career. Columbia Pictures signed her to a six-month contract in 1939. She met Howard Hughes, who tried unsuccessfully to seduce her. From a well-to-do family herself, she was not impressed by his wealth. Hughes eventually became a lifelong friend.

After a cameraman advised Tierney to lose a little weight, she wrote to Harper's Bazaar magazine for a diet, which she followed for the next 25 years. Tierney was initially offered the lead role in National Velvet, but production was delayed. When Columbia Pictures failed to find Tierney a project, she returned to Broadway and starred as Patricia Stanley to critical and commercial success in The Male Animal (1940). In The New York Times, Brooks Atkinson wrote, "Tierney blazes with animation in the best performance she has yet given". She was the toast of Broadway before her 20th birthday. The Male Animal was a hit, and Tierney was featured in Life. She was also photographed by Harper's Bazaar, Vogue, and Collier's Weekly.

Two weeks after The Male Animal opened, Darryl F. Zanuck, the head of 20th Century Fox, was rumored to have been in the audience. During the performance, he told an assistant to note Tierney's name. Later that night, Zanuck dropped by the Stork Club, where he saw a young lady on the dance floor. He told his assistant, "Forget the girl from the play. See if you can sign that one." She was Tierney. At first, Zanuck did not think she was the actress he had seen. Tierney was quoted (after the fact), saying: "I always had several different 'looks', a quality that proved useful in my career."

=== Film career ===
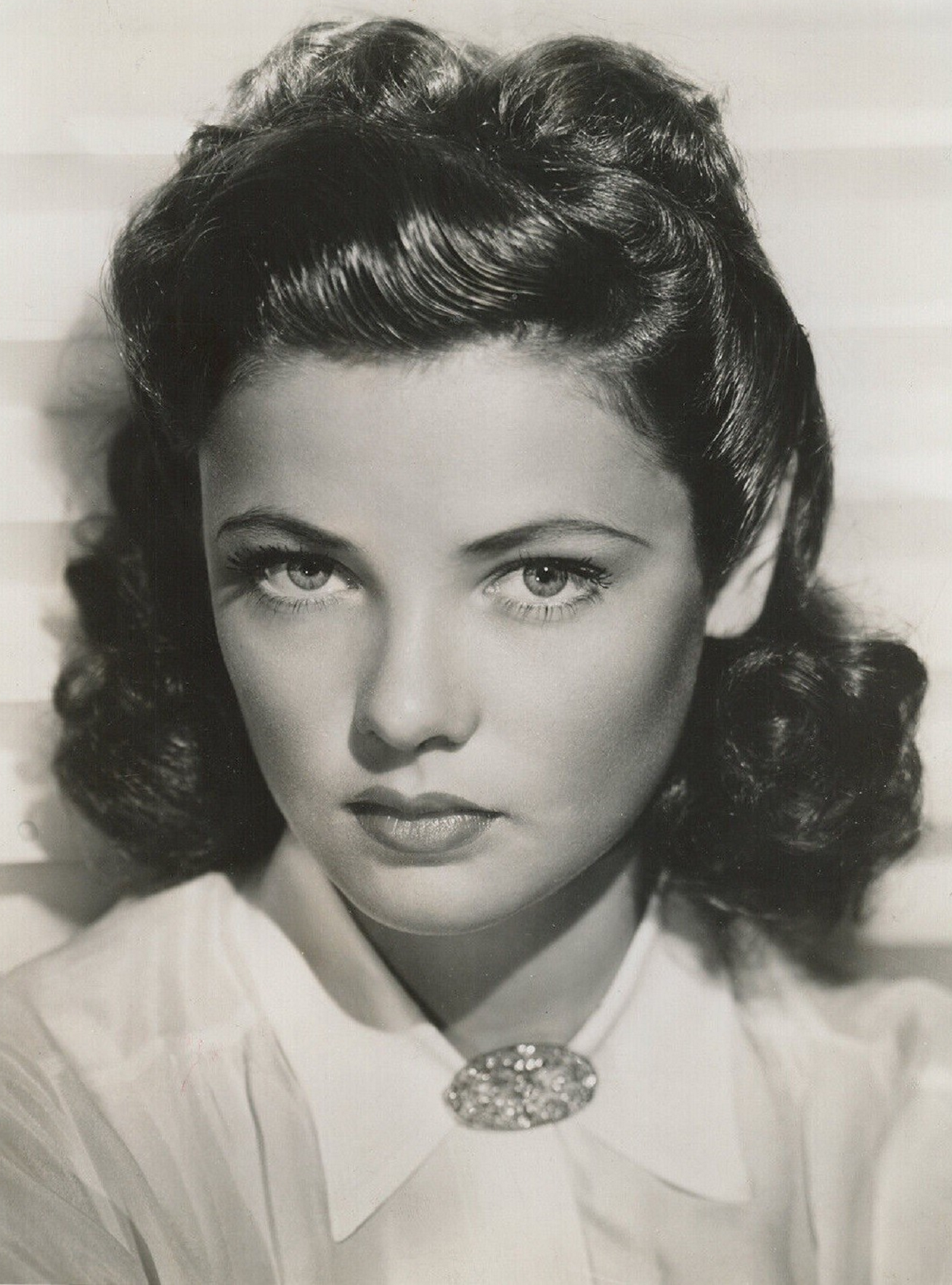
Publicity photo (1941)

Tierney signed with 20th Century-Fox and her motion picture debut was in a supporting role as Eleanor Stone in Fritz Lang's Western The Return of Frank James (1940), opposite Henry Fonda.

A small role as Barbara Hall followed in Hudson's Bay (1941) with Paul Muni and she co-starred as Ellie Mae Lester in John Ford's comedy Tobacco Road (also 1941), and played the title role in Belle Starr alongside co-star Randolph Scott, Zia in Sundown, and Victoria Charteris (Poppy Smith) in The Shanghai Gesture. She played Eve in Son of Fury: The Story of Benjamin Blake (1942), as well as the dual role of Susan Miller (Linda Worthington) in Rouben Mamoulian's screwball comedy Rings on Her Fingers, and roles as Kay Saunders in Thunder Birds, and Miss Young in China Girl (all 1942).

Receiving top billing in Ernst Lubitsch's comedy Heaven Can Wait (1943), as Martha Strable Van Cleve, signaled an upward turn in Tierney's career. Tierney recalled during the production of Heaven Can Wait:

Lubitsch was a tyrant on the set, the most demanding of directors. After one scene, which took from noon until five to get, I was almost in tears from listening to Lubitsch shout at me. The next day I sought him out, looked him in the eye, and said, 'Mr. Lubitsch, I'm willing to do my best but I just can't go on working on this picture if you're going to keep shouting at me.' 'I'm paid to shout at you', he bellowed. 'Yes', I said, 'and I'm paid to take it – but not enough.' After a tense pause, Lubitsch broke out laughing. From then on we got along famously.

Tierney starred in what became her best-remembered role: the title role in Otto Preminger's film noir Laura (1944), opposite Dana Andrews (with whom she would work again in The Iron Curtain and Preminger's Where The Sidewalk Ends).

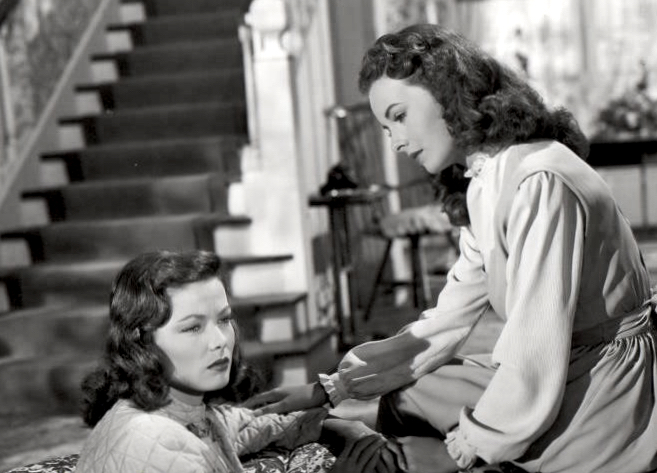
Gene Tierney and Jeanne Crain in Leave Her to Heaven (1945)

After playing Tina Tomasino in A Bell for Adano (1945), she played the jealous, narcissistic femme fatale Ellen Berent Harland in Leave Her to Heaven (1945), adapted from a bestselling novel by Ben Ames Williams. Appearing with Cornel Wilde, Tierney was nominated for an Academy Award for Best Actress. This was 20th Century-Fox's most successful film of the 1940s. It was cited by director Martin Scorsese as one of his favorite films, and he assessed Tierney as one of the most underrated actresses of the Golden Era.

Tierney starred as Miranda Wells in Dragonwyck (1946), along with Walter Huston and Vincent Price. It was Joseph L. Mankiewicz' debut film as a director. In the same period, she starred as Isabel Bradley, opposite Tyrone Power, in The Razor's Edge (also 1946), an adaptation of W. Somerset Maugham's novel of the same name. Her performance was critically praised.

Tierney played Lucy Muir in Mankiewicz's The Ghost and Mrs. Muir (1947), opposite Rex Harrison. The following year, she co-starred again with Power, this time as Sara Farley in the successful screwball comedy That Wonderful Urge (1948). As the decade came to a close, Tierney reunited with Laura director Preminger to star as Ann Sutton in the classic film noir Whirlpool (1950), co-starring Richard Conte and José Ferrer. She appeared in two other films noir: Jules Dassin's Night and the City, shot in London, and Otto Preminger's Where the Sidewalk Ends (both 1950), reunited with both Preminger and leading man Dana Andrews, with whom she appeared in five movies total including The Iron Curtain and, before Laura, Belle Starr and Tobacco Road.

Tierney was lent to Paramount Pictures, giving a comic turn as Maggie Carleton in Mitchell Leisen's ensemble farce, The Mating Season (1951), with John Lund, Thelma Ritter, and Miriam Hopkins. She gave a tender performance as Midge Sheridan in the Warner Bros. film, Close to My Heart (1951), with Ray Milland. The film is about a couple trying to adopt a child. Later in her career, she was reunited with Milland in Daughter of the Mind (1969).

After Tierney appeared opposite Rory Calhoun as Teresa in Way of a Gaucho (1952), her contract at 20th Century-Fox expired. That same year, she starred as Dorothy Bradford in Plymouth Adventure, opposite Spencer Tracy at MGM. Tracy and she had a brief affair during this time. Tierney played Marya Lamarkina opposite Clark Gable in Never Let Me Go (1953), filmed in the UK.

In the course of the 1940s, she reached a pinnacle of fame as a beautiful leading lady, on a par with "fellow sirens Rita Hayworth, Lana Turner and Ava Gardner". She was called “the most beautiful woman in movie history" and many of her movies in the 1940s became classic films.

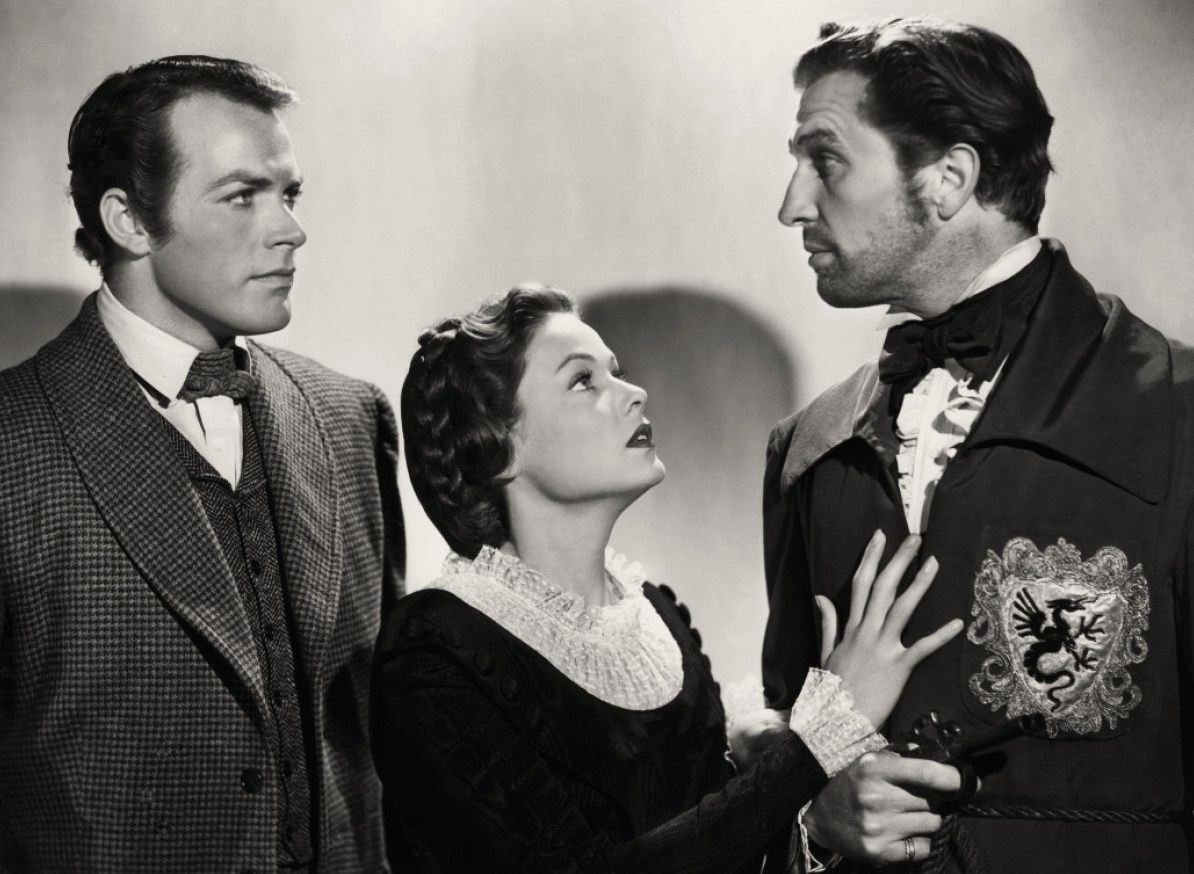
L–R: Glenn Langan, Gene Tierney, and Vincent Price in Dragonwyck

Tierney remained in Europe to play Kay Barlow in United Artists' Personal Affair (1953). While in Europe, she began a romance with Prince Aly Khan, but their marriage plans met with fierce opposition from his father Aga Khan III. Early in 1953, Tierney returned to the U.S. to co-star in the film noir Black Widow (1954) as Iris Denver, with Ginger Rogers and Van Heflin.

=== Health ===
Tierney had reportedly started smoking after a screening of her first movie to lower her voice, because she felt that she sounded "like an angry Minnie Mouse." She subsequently became a heavy smoker.

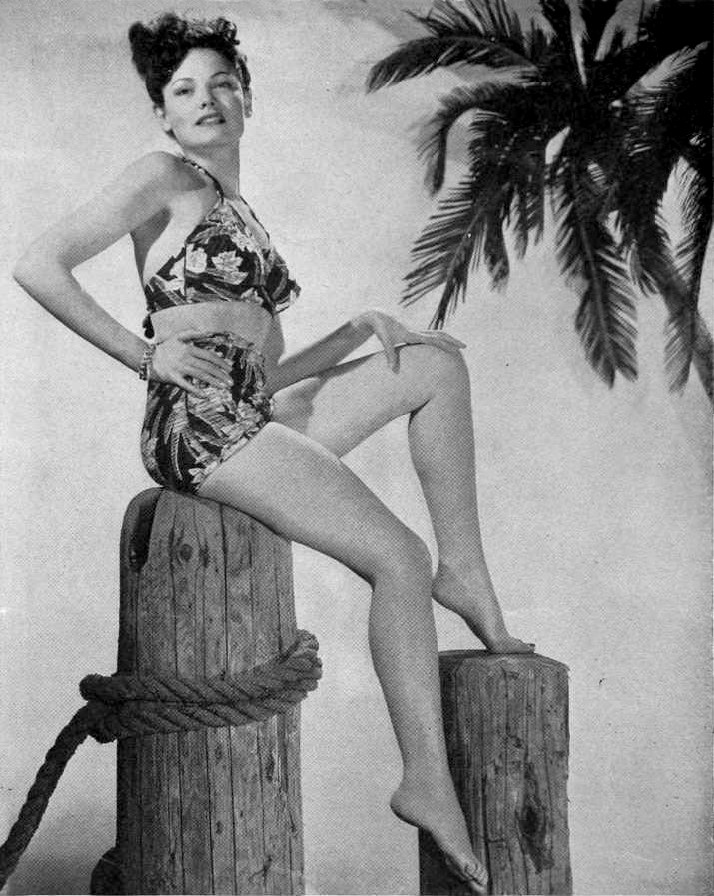
Pin-up photo in World War II magazine Brief

Tierney struggled for years with episodes of manic depression. In 1943, she gave birth to a daughter, Daria, who was deaf and mentally disabled, due to congenital rubella syndrome. In 1953, she suffered problems with concentration, which affected her film appearances. She dropped out of Mogambo and was replaced by Grace Kelly. While playing Anne Scott in The Left Hand of God (1955), opposite Humphrey Bogart, Tierney had a relapse. Bogart's sister had suffered from mental illness, so he showed Tierney great sympathy, feeding her lines during the production and encouraging her to seek help.

Tierney consulted a psychiatrist and was admitted to Harkness Pavilion in New York. Later, she went to the Institute of Living in Hartford, Connecticut. After some 27 shock treatments, intended to alleviate severe depression, Tierney fled the facility, but was caught and returned. She later became an outspoken opponent of shock treatment therapy, claiming it had destroyed significant portions of her memory.

In late December 1957, Tierney, at her mother's apartment in Manhattan, stepped onto a ledge 14 stories above ground and remained for about 20 minutes in what was considered a suicide attempt. Police were called, and afterwards, Tierney's family arranged for her to be admitted to the Menninger Clinic in Topeka, Kansas. The following year, after treatment for depression, she was discharged. Afterwards, she worked as a sales girl in a local dress shop with hopes of integrating back into society. A Topeka newspaper reported on her employment status, which gained national attention.

Later in 1958, 20th Century Fox offered Tierney a lead role in Holiday for Lovers (1959), but the stress upon her proved too great, so only days into production, she dropped out of the film and returned to Menninger, for a time.

=== Comeback ===
Tierney made a screen comeback in Advise and Consent (1962), co-starring with Franchot Tone and reuniting with director Otto Preminger. Soon afterwards, she played Albertine Prine in Toys in the Attic (1963), based on the play by Lillian Hellman. This was followed by the international production of Las Cuatro Noches de la Luna Llena (Four Nights of the Full Moon – 1963), in which she starred with Dan Dailey. She received critical praise overall for her performances.

Tierney's career as a solid character actress seemed to be back on track as she played Jane Barton in The Pleasure Seekers (1964), but then she suddenly retired. She returned to star in the television movie Daughter of the Mind (1969) with Don Murray and Ray Milland. Her final performance was in the TV miniseries Scruples (1980).

== Personal life ==
Tierney was married twice. Her first husband was Oleg Cassini, a costume and fashion designer, with whom she eloped on June 1, 1941. She was 20 years old, and Cassini was 28. Her parents opposed the marriage because he was from a Russian-Italian family, born in France. She and Cassini had two daughters, Daria and Christina.

In June 1943, while pregnant with Daria, Tierney contracted rubella (German measles), likely from a fan ill with the disease. Daria was born prematurely in Washington, D.C., weighing three pounds two ounces (1.4 kg) and requiring a total blood transfusion. The rubella caused congenital damage: Daria was deaf, partially blind with cataracts, and severely mentally disabled. She was institutionalized for much of her life. This entire incident was inspiration for the plot in the 1962 Agatha Christie novel The Mirror Crack'd from Side to Side.

Tierney's friend Howard Hughes paid for Daria's medical expenses, ensuring the girl received the best care. Tierney never forgot his acts of kindness. Daria died on September 11, 2010, at the age of 66. Through Christina, Tierney had four grandchildren and six great-grandchildren.

Tierney and Cassini separated October 20, 1946, and entered into a property settlement agreement on November 10. Her divorce from Cassini was to be finalized in March 1948, but they reconciled before then. They actually divorced in 1952, but remained friends until her death in November 1991. Their divorce settlement specified that at Cassini’s death, half of his wealth would go to their daughters.

After his death in 2006, Cassini bequeathed $500,000 in trust to Daria and $1,000,000 to Christina. Christina sued Cassini's widow Marianne Nestor for one quarter of the estate, based on the agreement in the divorce settlement, but Nestor argued that the divorce decree was overridden by the will. Nestor claimed the provision was unenforceable because it had been made more than 60 years previously. Despite the New York Surrogate Court ruling in favour of Christina, she did not receive her inheritance before she died in poverty in 2015.

During her separation from Cassini, Tierney met John F. Kennedy, a young World War II veteran, who was visiting the set of Dragonwyck in 1946. They began a romance that she ended the following year after Kennedy told her he could never marry her because of his political ambitions. In 1960, Tierney sent Kennedy a note of congratulations on his victory in the presidential election. Her former husband, Cassini, would go on to design outfits for Jackie Kennedy.

In 1952, newspapers documented that Tierney was in a romantic relationship with Kirk Douglas. Later, while filming for Personal Affair in Europe, she began a romance with Prince Aly Khan. They became engaged while Khan was going through a divorce from Rita Hayworth. Their marriage plans, however, were met with fierce opposition from his father, Aga Khan III.

In 1958, Tierney met Texas oil baron W. Howard Lee, who had been married to actress Hedy Lamarr since 1953. Lee and Lamarr divorced in 1960 after a long battle over alimony. Lee and Tierney married in Aspen, Colorado, on July 11, 1960. They lived quietly in Houston, Texas, and Delray Beach, Florida, until his death in 1981.

Despite her self-imposed exile in Texas, Tierney received work offers from Hollywood, prompting her to make a comeback. She appeared in a November 1960 broadcast of General Electric Theater, during which time she discovered that she was pregnant. Shortly after, 20th Century Fox announced Tierney would play the leading role in Return to Peyton Place, but she withdrew from the production after suffering a miscarriage.

== Later years ==
Tierney's autobiography, Self-Portrait, in which she candidly discusses her life, career, her appearance, and mental illness, was published in 1979.

In 1986, Tierney was honored alongside actor Gregory Peck with the first Donostia Lifetime Achievement Award at the San Sebastian Film Festival in Spain.

Tierney was awarded a star on the Hollywood Walk of Fame at 6125 Hollywood Boulevard on February 8, 1960.

== Death ==
Tierney, a lifelong smoker, died of emphysema on November 6, 1991 at her home in Houston, aged 70. She is interred in Glenwood Cemetery in Houston.

Certain documents of Tierney's film-related material, personal papers, letters, etc., are held in the Wesleyan University Cinema Archives, though her papers are closed to the public.

== Broadway credits ==
| Year | Title | Format/genre | Role | Staged by |
|---|---|---|---|---|
| 1938 | What A Life! | Original play, comedy | Walk on, Water carrier | George Abbott |
| 1938 | The Primrose Path | Original play, drama/comedy | Understudy | George Abbott |
| 1939 | Mrs O'Brien Entertains | Original play, comedy | Molly O'Day | George Abbott |
| 1939 | Ring Two | Original play, Comedy | Peggy Carr | George Abbott |
| 1940 | The Male Animal | Original play, Comedy/drama | Patricia Stanley | Herman Shumlin |

== Filmography ==
| Year | Title | Role | Director | Other cast members | Notes |
|---|---|---|---|---|---|
| 1940 | The Return of Frank James | Eleanor Stone | Fritz Lang | Henry Fonda | Technicolor |
| 1941 | Hudson's Bay | Barbara Hall | Irving Pichel | Paul Muni; Vincent Price | |
| 1941 | Tobacco Road | Ellie Mae Lester | John Ford | Charles Grapewin; Dana Andrews | |
| 1941 | Belle Starr | Belle Starr | Irving Cummings | Randolph Scott; Dana Andrews | Technicolor |
| 1941 | Sundown | Zia | Henry Hathaway | Bruce Cabot | |
| 1941 | The Shanghai Gesture | Victoria Charteris aka Poppy Smith | Josef von Sternberg | Walter Huston | |
| 1942 | Son of Fury: The Story of Benjamin Blake | Eve | John Cromwell | Tyrone Power | Sepia tone (sequences) |
| 1942 | Rings on Her Fingers | Susan Miller (aka Linda Worthington) | Rouben Mamoulian | Henry Fonda | |
| 1942 | Thunder Birds | Kay Saunders | William A. Wellman | Preston Foster; John Sutton | Technicolor |
| 1942 | China Girl | Miss Haoli Young | Henry Hathaway | George Montgomery | |
| 1943 | Heaven Can Wait | Martha Strabel Van Cleve | Ernst Lubitsch | Don Ameche | Technicolor |
| 1944 | Laura | Laura Hunt | Otto Preminger | Dana Andrews; Clifton Webb; Vincent Price | |
| 1945 | A Bell for Adano | Tina Tomasino | Henry King | John Hodiak | |
| 1945 | Leave Her to Heaven | Ellen Berent Harland | John M. Stahl | Cornel Wilde; Jeanne Crain; Vincent Price | Nominated—Academy Award for Best Actress; Technicolor |
| 1946 | Dragonwyck | Miranda Wells Van Ryn | Joseph L. Mankiewicz | Walter Huston; Vincent Price | |
| 1946 | The Razor's Edge | Isabel Bradley Maturin | Edmund Goulding | Tyrone Power; Anne Baxter; John Payne | |
| 1947 | The Ghost and Mrs. Muir | Lucy Muir | Joseph L. Mankiewicz | Rex Harrison; Natalie Wood; George Sanders; Edna Best | |
| 1948 | The Iron Curtain | Anna Gouzenko | William A. Wellman | Dana Andrews | |
| 1948 | That Wonderful Urge | Sara Farley | Robert B. Sinclair | Tyrone Power | |
| 1950 | Whirlpool | Ann Sutton | Otto Preminger | Richard Conte; José Ferrer | |
| 1950 | Night and the City | Mary Bristol | Jules Dassin | Richard Widmark | |
| 1950 | Where the Sidewalk Ends | Morgan Taylor (Payne) | Otto Preminger | Dana Andrews | |
| 1951 | The Mating Season | Maggie Carleton McNulty | Mitchell Leisen | John Lund; Miriam Hopkins; Thelma Ritter | |
| 1951 | On the Riviera | Lili Duran | Walter Lang | Danny Kaye | Technicolor |
| 1951 | The Secret of Convict Lake | Marcia Stoddard | Michael Gordon | Glenn Ford | |
| 1951 | Close to My Heart | Midge Sheridan | William Keighley | Ray Milland | |
| 1952 | Way of a Gaucho | Teresa | Jacques Tourneur | Rory Calhoun | Technicolor |
| 1952 | Plymouth Adventure | Dorothy Bradford | Clarence Brown | Spencer Tracy; Van Johnson; Leo Genn | Technicolor |
| 1953 | Never Let Me Go | Marya Lamarkina | Delmer Daves | Clark Gable | |
| 1953 | Personal Affair | Kay Barlow | Anthony Pelissier | Leo Genn; Glynis Johns | |
| 1954 | Black Widow | Iris Denver | Nunnally Johnson | Ginger Rogers; Van Heflin | CinemaScope, Deluxe color |
| 1954 | The Egyptian | Baketamon | Michael Curtiz | Jean Simmons; Victor Mature; Edmund Purdom | CinemaScope, Deluxe color |
| 1955 | The Left Hand of God | Anne Scott | Edward Dmytryk | Humphrey Bogart | CinemaScope, Deluxe color |
| 1962 | Advise & Consent | Dolly Harrison | Otto Preminger | Henry Fonda; Walter Pidgeon; Franchot Tone | Panavision |
| 1963 | Toys in the Attic | Albertine Prine | George Roy Hill | Dean Martin; Geraldine Page | |
| 1963 | Las cuatro noches de la luna llena | | Sobey Martin | Dan Dailey | English title: Four Nights of the Full Moon Lost film. |
| 1964 | The Pleasure Seekers | Jane Barton | Jean Negulesco | Ann-Margret; Anthony Franciosa | CinemaScope, Deluxe color |

== Television credits ==
| Year | Title | Role | Other cast members | Notes |
|---|---|---|---|---|
| 1947 | The Sir Charles Mendl Show | Herself | Host: Sir Charles Mendl | |
| 1953 | Toast of the Town | Herself | Host: Ed Sullivan | Episode #6.33 |
| 1954 | 26th Academy Awards | Herself | Host: Donald O'Connor, Fredric March | Presenter: Costume Design Awards |
| 1957 | What's My Line? | Herself | Host: John Charles Daly | Episode: August 25, Mystery guest |
| 1960 | General Electric Theater | Ellen Galloway | Host: Ronald Reagan | Episode: "Journey to a Wedding" |
| 1969 | The F.B.I. | Faye Simpson | Efrem Zimbalist Jr. | Episode: "Conspiracy of Silence" |
| 1969 | Daughter of the Mind | Lenore Constable | Ray Milland | TV movie |
| 1974 | The Merv Griffin Show | Herself | Host: Merv Griffin | |
| 1979 | The Merv Griffin Show | Herself | Host: Merv Griffin | |
| 1980 | The Tonight Show Starring Johnny Carson | Herself | Host: Johnny Carson | |
| 1980 | The Mike Douglas Show | Herself | Host: Mike Douglas | |
| 1980 | Dinah! | Herself | Host: Dinah Shore | |
| 1980 | Scruples | Harriet Toppington | Lindsay Wagner | TV miniseries |
| 1999 | Biography | Herself (archive material) | Host: Peter Graves | "Gene Tierney: A Shattered Portrait", biographical documentary, March 26 |

== Radio appearances ==
| Year | Program | Episode/source |
|---|---|---|
| 1945 | Old Gold Comedy Theatre | A Lady Takes a Chance |
| 1946 | Lux Radio Theatre | Dragonwyck |
| 1946 | Hollywood Star Time | Bedelia |

== Awards and nominations ==
| Year | Organization | Work | Category | Result | Ref. |
|---|---|---|---|---|---|
| 1946 | Academy Awards | Leave Her to Heaven | Best Actress | Nominated | |
| 1960 | Hollywood Walk of Fame | —N/a | Star - Motion Pictures | Honored | |
| 1986 | San Sebastián International Film Festival | —N/a | Donostia Lifetime Achievement Award | Won | |

== Cultural references ==
- Tierney was ranked number 71 in Premiere Magazine's 2006 list of "The 100 Sexiest Movie Stars of All Time".
- A comedy routine between Dean Martin and Jerry Lewis involved Lewis (in boxing shorts and gear) stating that he's fighting Gene Tierney. This plays on the similarly named Gene Tunney, who held the world heavyweight boxing title from 1926 to 1928.
- In a third-season episode of M*A*S*H* ("House Arrest"), the characters watch Tierney in Leave Her to Heaven. After Cornel Wilde kisses Tierney passionately, Hawkeye Pierce says, "If he straightens out that overbite, I'll kill him."
- Tierney was featured as the heroine of a novel, Gene Tierney and the Invisible Wedding Gift (1947), written by Kathryn Heisenfelt.
- Agatha Christie is widely assumed to have drawn the basic idea for her 1962 novel The Mirror Crack'd from Side to Side from the real-life German measles tragedy of Tierney and her baby.
- The Off-Broadway musical Violet references Gene Tierney several times. The main character Violet states that she wants a pair of "Gene Tierney eyes" due to the fact that her face was disfigured after an accident involving her father.
- Tierney is routinely discussed in the 2005 Irish novel An Evening of Long Goodbyes by Paul Murray

== Bibliography ==
- Cassini, Oleg (1987). In My Own Fashion: An Autobiography. Simon & Schuster. ISBN 0-671-62640-X.
- Devillers, Marceau (1987). Gene Tierney: A Biography. Pygmalion/G.Watelel. ISBN 2-85704-230-2.
- Mérigeau, Pascal (1987). Gene Tierney: A Biography. Paris: Edilig. ISBN 2-85601-174-8.
- Tierney, Gene; Herskowitz, Mickey (1979). Self-Portrait. Peter Wyden. ISBN 0-88326-152-9.
- Vogel, Michelle (2005). Gene Tierney: A Biography. McFarland & Company. ISBN 0-7864-2035-9.
