= Where the Sidewalk Ends (film) =

1950 film by Otto Preminger

- Theatrical release poster
- Directed by: Otto Preminger
- Screenplay by: Ben Hecht
- Story by: Victor Trivas; Frank P. Rosenberg; Robert E. Kent
- Based on: Night Cry; 1948 novel by William L. Stuart
- Produced by: Otto Preminger
- Starring: Dana Andrews; Gene Tierney; Gary Merrill
- Cinematography: Joseph LaShelle
- Edited by: Louis Loeffler
- Music by: Cyril Mockridge
- Color process: Black and white
- Production company: 20th Century Fox
- Distributed by: 20th Century Fox
- Release date: July 7, 1950
- Running time: 95 minutes
- Country: United States
- Language: English
- Budget: $1,475,000
- Box office: $1 million

Where the Sidewalk Ends is a 1950 American film noir directed and produced by Otto Preminger. The screenplay for the film was written by Ben Hecht and adapted by Robert E. Kent, Frank P. Rosenberg and Victor Trivas based on the novel Night Cry by William L. Stuart. The film stars Dana Andrews and Gene Tierney.

Considered by many as a classic of the film noir genre, the film displays a brand of violence "lurking below urban society", a significant noir motif.

== Plot ==
New York police detective Mark Dixon is demoted by Inspector Foley because of his frequent use of violence that echoes his father's criminal past. At a hotel, gangster Tommy Scalise's floating crap game becomes the scene of a visiting Texas tycoon's murder. Police are summoned, including Dixon, who had arrested Scalise years earlier for murder, although Scalise was acquitted. Interrogation yields information that newspaper columnist Ken Paine and model Morgan Taylor had left the game early. Dixon questions Paine, who is drunk and belligerent, and strikes him a blow that kills him.

Dixon attempts to conceal Paine's death, laying a false trail suggesting that Paine had left town. Dixon barely avoids being seen by Taylor's father, cab driver Jiggs Taylor. Dixon dumps Paine's corpse in the river, but the body is soon discovered. To cover himself, Dixon suggests that Scalise murdered Paine as well as the tycoon.

As the case develops, detectives talk to Morgan and Jiggs. Morgan was Paine's estranged wife, and the night of the murder was the first time that she had seen him in months. Dixon insists that Scalise was the murderer, but Jiggs, who had previously threatened Paine, had been seen at Paine's apartment and is arrested. Dixon and Morgan have developed a mutual attraction, but he cannot bear to tell her the truth. He borrows money to hire a top lawyer for Jiggs, but the attorney refuses the case.

Dixon brawls with Scalise's men and is beaten badly. When one of the men reports Dixon's violence to the police, Inspector Foley angrily scolds Dixon. Distraught, Dixon writes a confession letter addressed to Foley, to be opened if Dixon should die.

Dixon arranges to meet with Scalise again, expecting to be murdered with Scalise held responsible. However, Scalise realizes Dixon's intentions and refuses to kill him, shooting him in the arm instead. One of Scalise's men arrives with news that police have learned the truth about the tycoon's murder from an informant. As the gang attempts escape in a car elevator, Dixon delays them by stalling it until police arrive.

At the police precinct, Foley commends Dixon and returns the unopened confession letter to him. Dixon tells Foley to open and read it. After reading the letter, Foley arrests Dixon. Morgan reads the letter, but her love for Dixon is undiminished and she confidently declares that he will not be punished for the accidental death.

== Cast ==
- Dana Andrews as Det. Mark Dixon
- Gene Tierney as Morgan Taylor
- Gary Merrill as Tommy Scalise
- Bert Freed as Det. Paul Klein
- Tom Tully as Jiggs Taylor
- Karl Malden as Lt. Thomas
- Ruth Donnelly as Martha
- Craig Stevens as Ken Paine
- Robert F. Simon as Inspector Nicholas Foley
- Neville Brand as Steve (uncredited)
- Harry von Zell as Mr. Morrison (uncredited)
- Oleg Cassini as Oleg (uncredited)

== Production ==
Where the Sidewalk Ends is the last film that Otto Preminger directed for Twentieth Century-Fox in the 1940s. He had previously directed the film's stars Gene Tierney and Dana Andrews in Laura (1944), Whirlpool (1950) with Tierney and Fallen Angel and Daisy Kenyon, both starring Andrews.

Lee J. Cobb was assigned the role of Jiggs Taylor but refused it, and Twentieth Century-Fox suspended him in December 1949. Cobb denied media reports that he had declined the role because it was that of a taxi driver but would not disclose his true reason. Tom Tully was announced as Cobb's replacement the following month.

Preminger had originally named Louise Lorimer's Mrs. Jackson character Miss LaShelle after the film's cinematographer Joseph LaShelle.

Although the film was primarily shot on a studio set, some scenes were filmed on location in New York.

== Reception ==
In a contemporary review for The New York Times, critic Howard Thompson wrote: "This graphically-presented account of a sadistic detective who accidentally kills a man and tries to pin it on a slippery public enemy doesn't have the over-all trigger tension of 'Kiss of Death' or the picturesqueness of 'Cry of the City.' And the plausibility of the script by Ben Hecht, an old hand with station houses and sleazy underworldlings, is open to question on several counts. Not so, however, his pungent dialogue and unfolding of the plot, which Otto Preminger, who guided the same stars through 'Laura' several seasons back, has taken to like a duck to water and kept clipping along crisply till the fadeout."

Variety wrote: "Story, by Ben Hecht, unwinds with a maximum of suspense and swiftly paced action and is featured by an excellent performance by Dana Andrews. Otto Preminger, director, does an excellent job of pacing the story and of building sympathy for Andrews."

Harrison's Reports called the film "one of the most taut and absorbing crime melodramas produced in many a moon," with "exceptionally good" dialogue.

John McCarten of The New Yorker called the film "a fair-to-middling-melodrama."

== Legacy ==
The Academy Film Archive preserved Where the Sidewalk Ends in 2004.
