= Hal K. Dawson =

American actor (1896–1987)

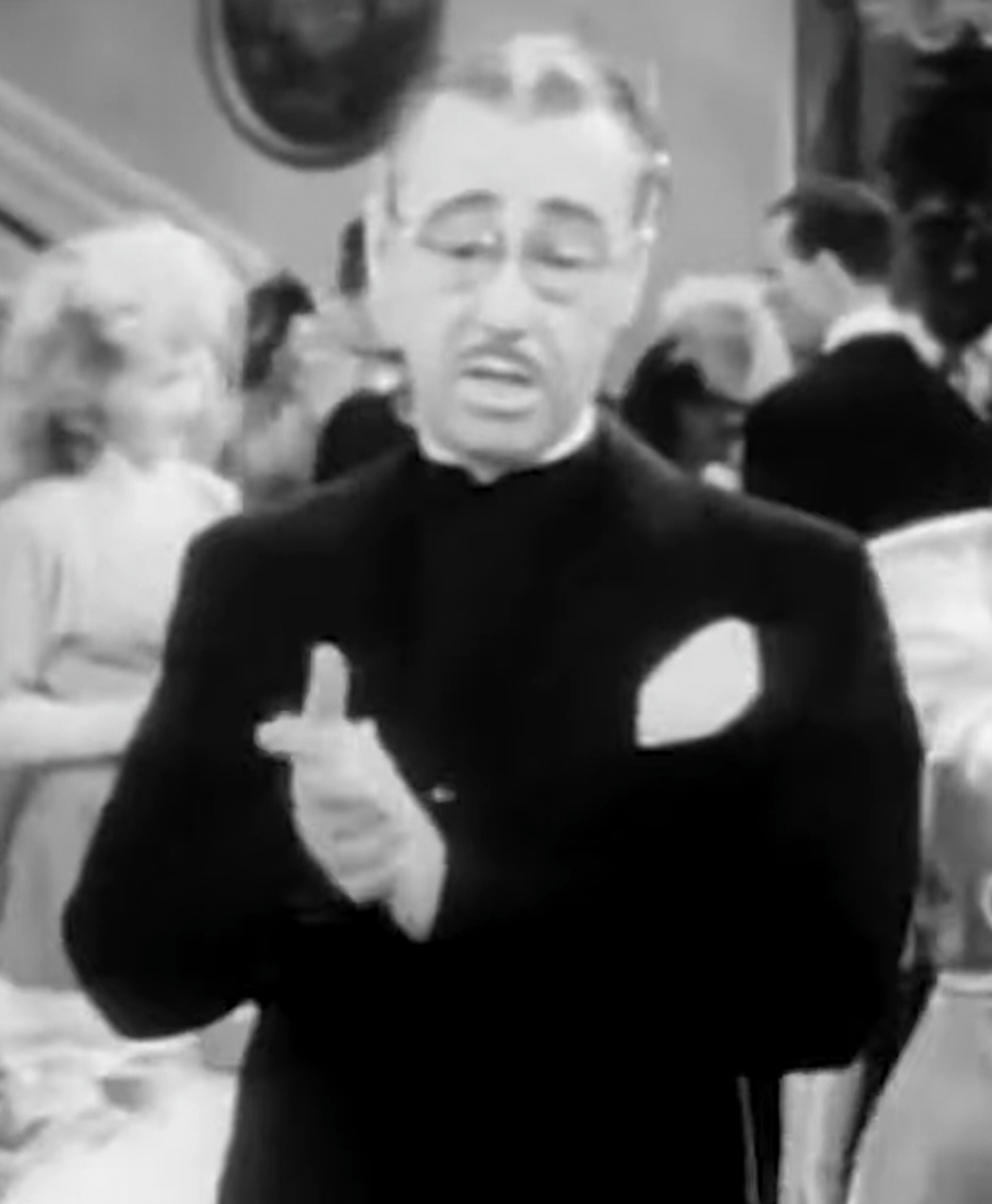
- Dawson in Hi Diddle Diddle (1943)
- Born: October 17, 1896
- Died: February 17, 1987 (aged 90); Loma Linda, California, U.S.
- Resting place: Forest Lawn Memorial Park, Glendale
- Occupation: Actor
- Years active: 1930–1980

Hal K. Dawson (October 17, 1896 – February 17, 1987) was an American actor.

== Death ==
Dawson died on February 17, 1987, in Loma Linda, California aged 90. He was buried in Forest Lawn Memorial Park Cemetery in Glendale, California.

== Selected filmography ==
- Another Language (1933) as Walter
- Dr. Socrates (1935) as Mel Towne (uncredited)
- Music Is Magic (1935) as Jim Watson (uncredited)
- Everybody's Old Man (1936) as Jameson
- Public Enemy's Wife (1936) as Daugherty
- My American Wife (1936) as Stephen Cantillon
- Down the Stretch (1936) as Mr. Watson (uncredited)
- Libeled Lady (1936) as Harvey Allen
- We're on the Jury (1937) as Mr. John Weatherman
- Park Avenue Logger (1937) as Joe, Wrestling Manager (uncredited)
- Cafe Metropole (1937) as Arthur Cleveland Thorndyke
- She Had to Eat (1937) as Mr. McIntire, Telegraph Clerk (uncredited)
- On Again-Off Again (1937) as Sanford
- Wife, Doctor and Nurse (1937) as Dr. Hedges
- Danger – Love at Work (1937) as Mike, Chauffeur
- Second Honeymoon (1937) as Andy
- Wells Fargo (1937) as Ormsby, N.Y. Herald Correspondent (uncredited)
- The Nurse from Brooklyn (1938) as Tommy Tucker (uncredited)
- Always Goodbye (1938) as Al, Groom-to-Be (uncredited)
- Keep Smiling (1938) as Casting Director
- Sweethearts (1938) as Morty, Stage Manager
- Rose of Washington Square (1939) as Chump
- Joe and Ethel Turp Call on the President (1939) as Bill (uncredited)
- The Great Victor Herbert (1939) as George Faller
- Broadway Melody of 1940 (1940) as O'Grady (uncredited)
- Star Dust (1940) as Cargo, Wellman's Assistant
- The Doctor Takes a Wife (1940) as Charlie
- Washington Melodrama (1941) as Logan
- Week-End in Havana (1941) as Mr. Marks
- Song of the Islands (1942) as John Rodney
- The Magnificent Dope (1942) as Charlie
- Baby Face Morgan (1942) as J.B. Brown
- Obliging Young Lady (1942) as Bore in Pullman Car (uncredited)
- Hi Diddle Diddle (1943) as Dr. Agnew
- Guest Wife (1945) as Dennis
- Mr. Blandings Builds His Dream House (1948) as Harry Selby (uncredited)
- Chicken Every Sunday (1949) as Jake Barker
- Wabash Avenue (1950) as Healy
- Rhubarb (1951) as Mr. Fisher
- Superman and the Mole Men (1951) as Chuck Weber
- The Captive City (1952) as Clyde Nelson
- Park Row (1952) as Mr. Wiley
- Bonzo Goes to College (1952) as Mr. Cox (uncredited)
- The Yellow Mountain (1954) as Sam Torrence
- The Benny Goodman Story (1956) as McHenshey, Columbus Pavilion Manager
- The Tin Star (1957) as Andy Miller
- Cattle Empire (1958) as George Washington Jeffrey
- The Rat Race (1960) as Bo Kerry
- The Touch of Satan (1971) as Mr. Gentry
- Prime Time a.k.a. American Raspberry as Grandpa

== Selected television ==
Year	Title	Role	Notes
1952	Death Valley Days	Bill	Season 1 Episode 6: "Self Made Man"
1953	Death Valley Days	Jonah King	Season 2 Episode 4: "Which Side of the Fence"
1955	Champion the Wonder Horse	Jim Custer	Season 1 Episode 3: "Salted Ground"
1956	Alfred Hitchcock Presents	Secretary	Season 1 Episode 16: "You Got to Have Luck"
1957	Alfred Hitchcock Presents	Graham	Season 2 Episode 22: "The End of Indian Summer"
1961	Bat Masterson	Finnegan	Season 3 Episode 24: "The Good and the Bad"
1961	Have Gun - Will Travel	Bum	Season 4 Episode 26: "The Gold Bar"
1960	Wanted Dead or Alive	Henry Foster	Season 3 Episode 8: "To the Victor"
