= My Blue Heaven (1950 film) =

1950 film by Henry Koster

- Film poster
- Directed by: Henry Koster
- Screenplay by: Lamar Trotti; Claude Binyon
- Based on: Stork Don't Bring Babies by S.K. Lauren
- Produced by: Sol C. Siegel
- Starring: Betty Grable; Dan Dailey
- Cinematography: Arthur E. Arling
- Edited by: James B. Clark
- Color process: Technicolor
- Production company: 20th Century Fox
- Distributed by: 20th Century Fox
- Release date: September 15, 1950 (New York City)
- Running time: 96 minutes
- Country: United States
- Language: English
- Box office: $2,275,000 (US rentals)

My Blue Heaven is a 1950 American drama musical film directed by Henry Koster and starring Betty Grable and Dan Dailey. New songs by Harold Arlen and Ralph Blane.

== Plot ==
Radio star Kitty Moran learns that she is pregnant. After she miscarries, Kitty and her husband Jack move their show to television and become determined to adopt a baby.

Miss Gilbert, an adoption agency official, is sympathetic but warns them that the process can be complicated and that some officials may consider their showbusiness background unfavorably. Their dog Mr. Milton hides under the sofa whenever the subject of a baby is discussed. When Kitty and Jack finally receive a baby through unofficial means, Kitty fires strict nurse Mrs. Bates and stays home. This lasts five weeks until Kitty learns that her understudy Gloria Adams has her sights set on Jack, and Kitty returns to work.

Kitty and Jack find themselves with two adopted babies and the news that Kitty is pregnant again.

== Cast ==
- Betty Grable as Kitty Moran
- Dan Dailey as Jack Moran
- David Wayne as Walter Pringle
- Jane Wyatt as Janet Pringle
- Mitzi Gaynor as Gloria Adams
- Una Merkel as Miss Irma Gilbert
- Louise Beavers as Selma
- Laura Pierpont as Mrs. Johnston
- Elinor Donahue as Mary – Bratty Autograph Seeker
- Phyllis Coates as Party Girl
- Mae Marsh as Maid
- Minerva Urecal as Mrs. Bates aka Old Mule Face
- Suzanne Ridgeway as Audience Member / Passerby on Street
- Barbara Pepper as Susan, Waitress
- James Pierce as Tough Truck Driver (uncredited)
- Thomas Browne Henry as Tavern Owner (uncredited)
- Myron Healey as Adoptive Father (uncredited)

The film marks Gaynor's screen debut. Wyatt and Donahue later starred in the television show Father Knows Best (1954–1960).

== Production ==
Claude Binyon was announced as director in September 1949 and Betty Lynn was cast during the early planning stages, but Lynn does not appear in the film.

Grable, who had reluctantly played roles that she did not like in the past, such as in The Shocking Miss Pilgrim (1947), That Lady in Ermine (1948) and The Beautiful Blonde from Bashful Bend (1949), refused her assignment to My Blue Heaven, later saying: "I had never questioned any picture chosen for me before this, but when this one was proposed I said my first 'No.' I told them I wouldn't do it. They told me they would have to suspend me. I said, 'Well, I'll have to be suspended,' and I went to the races."

Twentieth Century-Fox relented, offering that Lamar Trotti, who had written Grable's earlier films Mother Wore Tights (1947) and When My Baby Smiles at Me (1948), would rewrite the script and that Henry Koster, who had recently directed Grable in Wabash Avenue (1950), would replace Binyon as director. Grable accepted, although she demanded several revisions to Trotti's screenplay. The studio reassigned Binyon to direct Family Skeleton, later renamed Stella.

My Blue Heaven was the third film in which Grable and Dailey has appeared together following Mother Wore Tights and When My Baby Smiles at Me. They later costarred in a fourth film, Call Me Mister (1951).

== Reception ==
In a contemporary review for The New York Times, critic Bosley Crowther called My Blue Heaven "a musical mishmash" and wrote a blistering assessment of television's effect on filmmaking:

"My Blue Heaven" ... apparently is angled at that audience which presumably gurgles and glees at the most elementary banalities that occur on the video screen, And since it succeeds in achieving the low level to which it aspires, it is probably the gooiest and guckiest musical film from Twentieth Century-Fox in years. To be sure, we have no way of knowing how such a mistake came about, but we rather imagine from the evidence that it came about something like this: Someone conceived the brilliant idea of making a musical film on this new television entertainment and the people who work in it. So the boys put their heads together and came up with another brilliant thought: Why not include the most popular of the air-waves' banalities—Motherhood? Why not make this picture about a husband-wife television team which is yearning to have a baby with all the fervor in their big expansive hearts? Why not combine the lushest features of a video variety show with the sentiment of a washboard weeper? "I'll buy it!" somebody must have cried.

== Adaptation ==
My Blue Heaven was presented on Lux Radio Theatre on February 25, 1952. The one-hour adaptation featured Grable and Dailey in their roles from the film.
