= Oh, Men! Oh, Women! =

1957 film by Nunnally Johnson

- 1957 Movie Poster
- Directed by: Nunnally Johnson
- Screenplay by: Nunnally Johnson
- Based on: Oh, Men! Oh, Women! (play) by Edward Chodorov
- Produced by: Nunnally Johnson
- Starring: Ginger Rogers; David Niven; Dan Dailey
- Cinematography: Charles G. Clarke
- Edited by: Marjorie Fowler
- Music by: Cyril J. Mockridge
- Production company: 20th Century Fox
- Distributed by: 20th Century Fox
- Release date: February 22, 1957
- Running time: 90 minutes
- Country: United States
- Language: English
- Budget: $1,780,000

Oh, Men! Oh, Women! is a 1957 American comedy film written, produced and directed by Nunnally Johnson, based on the play of the same name by Edward Chodorov. It stars Ginger Rogers, Dan Dailey and David Niven. It was the feature film debut of Tony Randall, who had played Dailey's role in the Broadway version, albeit as part of the replacement cast.

== Plot ==
Mildred Turner is a patient of a New York psychiatrist, Dr. Alan Coles. She is bored and frustrated in her marriage to a movie star, Arthur Turner. Coles is about to marry Myra Hagerman but is perplexed when neurotic new patient Grant Cobbler claims he is sleepless and heartsick over "Myra," the woman he loves. Coles is then completely bewildered when Mildred mentions that her husband also used to date Myra. While confronting her about all this, Coles can hardly believe his eyes when a tipsy Arthur shows up at Myra's, embracing her, followed by Cobbler, who repeats his adoration of her. It leads to a fight, followed by Coles meeting the other two suitors in a bar to drown their sorrows. Coles is able to persuade Arthur to show wife Mildred the affection she wants.

Alan later boards a luxury liner on the day he and Myra are supposed to set sail on a honeymoon cruise, not knowing if she will show up. When she does, Cobbler turns up as well. Coles tosses him down the gangplank. While still arguing about their situation, Coles and Myra fail to notice that the ship has sailed.

== Cast ==
- Dan Dailey as Arthur Turner
- Ginger Rogers as Mildred Turner
- David Niven as Dr. Alan Coles
- Tony Randall as Cobbler
- Barbara Rush as Myra Hagerman
- Natalie Schafer as patient Mrs. Day, in the opening scene.
- Franklin Pangborn (uncredited) as the Steamship Clerk.

== See also ==
- List of American films of 1957
