= Miriam Young =

American writer

- Born: Miriam Burt; February 26, 1913; New York City, New York, US
- Died: 12 September 1974 (aged 61); Lake Katonah, New York
- Occupation: Writer
- Writing career
- Genres: Children's literature, picture book texts
- Notable work: Mother Wore Tights

Miriam Young (died September 12, 1974) was an American writer best known for children's books. She also wrote Mother Wore Tights, a memoir about growing up in a vaudeville family, which was adapted as the 1947 film of the same name, a "Hollywood supermusical".

Young was born in 1911 or 1912, her New York Times obituary implies. Other sources give year of birth 1913. The Library of Congress gives date February 26, 1913.

== Selected works ==
- Mother Wore Tights (1944)
- The Dollar Horse (1961)
- The Secret of Stone House Farm (1963)
- Miss Suzy (1964)
- Jellybeans for Breakfast (1968)
- Miss Suzy's Easter Surprise(1972)
- A Witch's Garden (1973)
- Miss Suzy's Birthday Surprise (1974)
