= Lamar Trotti =

American film producer

- Born: Lamar Jefferson Trotti; October 18, 1900; Atlanta, US
- Died: August 28, 1952 (aged 51); Oceanside, California, US
- Occupations: Writer, screenwriter, motion picture executive
- Years active: 1933–1952
- Awards: Best Original Screenplay; 1945 Wilson

Lamar Jefferson Trotti (October 18, 1900 – August 28, 1952) was an American screenwriter, producer, and motion picture executive.

== Early life and education ==
Trotti was born in Atlanta, US. He became the first graduate of the Henry W. Grady College of Journalism and Mass Communication at the University of Georgia (UGA) in Athens, Georgia, when he received a Bachelor of Arts in journalism (ABJ) in 1921. While at UGA, he was the editor of the independent student newspaper The Red and Black.

== Professional career ==
In the silent film era, he was a reporter for the daily Atlanta Georgian, where he interviewed many show business people, such as Viola Dana. Later, Trotti became an executive at Fox Film Corporation in 1933 and after its 1935 merger with Twentieth Century Pictures to become 20th Century Fox, he remained with the company until his death. He wrote about fifty films for the studio, producing many of them. He only wrote one screenplay for another studio, You Can't Buy Everything (1934) for MGM.

He won an Academy Award for Writing Original Screenplay in 1944 for Wilson and was nominated for Young Mr. Lincoln (1939) and There's No Business Like Show Business (1952). He received the Laurel Award for Screenwriting Achievement, the lifetime achievement award of the WGA, in 1983.

== Personal life ==
Trotti was in ill heath towards the end of his life and had taken six months leave from Fox when he died of a heart attack at hospital near his summer home in St Malo in Oceanside, California. He was survived by a widow, a son and a daughter. His eldest son had died in a car crash in 1950. Henry Koster later wrote that he thought Trotti died of "a broken heart" because of his son's death.

== Partial filmography ==
- The Man Who Dared (1933) – writer (with Dudley Nichols)
- Hold That Girl (1934) – writer (with Dudley Nichols)
- Wild Gold (1934) – writer
- Call It Luck (1934) – writer (with Dudley Nichols)
- Judge Priest (1934) – writer (with Dudley Nichols) – directed by John Ford, with Will Rogers
- Bachelor of Arts (1934) – writer
- Life Begins at 40 (1934) – writer – with Will Rogers
- Mr. Faintheart (1935) – writer
- Steamboat Round the Bend (1935) – writer (with Dudley Nichols) – directed by John Ford, with Will Rogers
- This Is the Life (1935) – writer – with Jane Withers
- The First Baby (1936) – writer
- Gentle Julia (1936) – writer – with Jane Withers
- The Country Beyond (1936) – writer
- Pepper (1936) – writer – with Jane Withers
- Ramona (1936) – writer – directed by Henry King
- Can This Be Dixie? (1936) – writer – with Jane Withers
- Career Woman (1936) – writer
- Time Out for Romance (1936) – writer
- This Is My Affair (1937) – writer
- Slave Ship (1937) – writer
- Wife, Doctor and Nurse (1937) – writer – directed by Walter Lang
- Second Honeymoon (1937) – writer – directed by Walter Lang
- In Old Chicago (1937) – writer – directed by Henry King
- The Baroness and the Butler (1938) – writer – directed by Walter Lang
- Alexander's Ragtime Band (1938) – writer – directed by Henry King
- Gateway (1938) – writer
- Kentucky (1938) – writer
- The Story of Alexander Graham Bell (1939) – writer
- Young Mr. Lincoln (1939) – writer – directed by John Ford
- Drums Along the Mohawk (1939) – writer – directed by John Ford
- Brigham Young: Frontiersman (1940) – writer – directed by Henry Hathaway
- Hudson's Bay (1941) – writer
- Man Hunt (1941) – writer (with Dudley Nichols) – directed by Fritz Lang
- Belle Starr (1941) – writer
- To the Shores of Tripoli (1942) – writer
- Tales of Manhattan (1942) – writer
- Thunder Birds (1942) – writer, producer – directed by William Wellman
- Immortal Sergeant (1942) – writer, producer
- The Ox-Bow Incident (1943) – writer, producer – directed by William Wellman
- Guadalcanal Diary (1943) – writer
- Wilson (1944) – writer – directed by Henry King
- A Bell for Adano (1945) – writer, producer – directed by Henry King
- The Razor's Edge (1946) – writer
- Colonel Effingham's Raid (1946) – producer
- Mother Wore Tights (1947) – writer, producer – directed by Walter Lang
- Captain from Castile (1947) – writer, producer – directed by Henry King
- The Walls of Jericho (1948) – writer, producer
- When My Baby Smiles at Me (1948) – writer
- Yellow Sky (1948) – writer, producer – directed by William Wellman
- You're My Everything (1949) – writer, producer – directed by Walter Lang
- Cheaper by the Dozen (1950) – writer, producer – directed by Walter Lang
- My Blue Heaven (1950) – writer – directed by Henry Koster
- American Guerrilla in the Philippines (1950) – writer, producer – directed by Fritz Lang
- I'd Climb the Highest Mountain (1951) – writer, producer – directed by Walter Lang
- As Young as You Feel (1951) – writer, producer
- With a Song in My Heart (1952) – writer, producer – directed by Walter Lang
- O. Henry's Full House (1952) – writer
- Stars and Stripes Forever (1952) – writer, producer – directed by Henry Koster
- There's No Business Like Show Business (1954) – writer – directed by Walter Lang

== Other reading ==
- Smith, Maybard (1953). A survey of the screenplays written by Lamar Trotti with emphasis on their acceptance by professional and non-professional groups (Thesis). University of Southern California.
