= Moon Over Her Shoulder =

1941 film by Alfred L. Werker

- Directed by: Alfred L. Werker
- Written by: Walter Bullock; Eve Golden; Helen Vreeland Smith
- Produced by: Walter Morosco
- Starring: Lynn Bari; John Sutton; Alan Mowbray
- Cinematography: Lucien Andriot
- Edited by: J. Watson Webb, Jr.
- Music by: Cyril J. Mockridge
- Production company: 20th Century Fox
- Distributed by: 20th Century Fox
- Release date: October 24, 1941
- Running time: 68 minutes
- Country: United States
- Language: English

Moon Over Her Shoulder is a 1941 American comedy film directed by Alfred L. Werker and starring Lynn Bari, John Sutton and Alan Mowbray. It was produced and distributed by Twentieth Century Fox.

== Cast ==
- John Sutton as Phillip Rossiter
- Lynn Bari as Susan Rossiter
- Alan Mowbray as Grover Sloan
- Dan Dailey as Rex Gibson
- Leonard Carey as Dusty
- Irving Bacon as Conrad - Taxi Driver
- Joyce Compton as Cecilia
- Lillian Yarbo as Juline, the Maid
- Eula Guy as Mrs. Phyllis Bates
- Vivien Oakland as Mrs. Martin
- Edmund Mortimer as Melvin Lathwood
- Arthur Hoyt as Daniel Q. Boone Sr.
- Minerva Urecal as Mrs. Duggins - Scoutmistress
- Lester Dorr as Lester - the Desk Clerk
- Pat O'Malley as Bartender
- Kay Linaker as Radio Hostess
- Gino Corrado as Waiter

== Bibliography ==
- Fetrow, Alan G. Feature Films, 1940-1949: a United States Filmography. McFarland, 1994.
