= Daughter of the Mind =

1969 horror film

- Opening title card
- Based on: The Hand of Mary Constable by Paul Gallico
- Screenplay by: Luther Davis
- Directed by: Walter Grauman
- Starring: Ray Milland; Pamelyn Ferdin; Don Murray; Gene Tierney
- Theme music composer: Robert Drasnin
- Country of origin: United States
- Original language: English

Production
- Cinematography: Jack Woolf
- Running time: 90 min.

Original release
- Network: ABC
- Release: December 9, 1969

Daughter of the Mind is a 1969 American made-for-television horror-thriller film starring Don Murray, Ray Milland and Gene Tierney. It was first broadcast on ABC on December 9, 1969 as the ABC Movie of the Week. It was based on the book The Hand of Mary Constable (1964) by Paul Gallico.

== Plot ==
At the request of a colleague, psychologist and ESP researcher Dr. Alex Lauder investigates leading cybernetic expert Dr. Samuel Hale Constable's claim that he has seen and spoken with his young daughter, Mary, who died 13 weeks before. Keeping an open mind, Lauder decides to take the case and see where it may lead.

As Lauder's investigation progresses, he learns that U.S. government counter-intelligence is watching his every move with great interest. "Mary" appears to others besides her father (always preceded by Mary hauntingly calling out "Daddy"), including Lauder, Mary's mother and other acquaintances during a seance. "Mary" leaves physical evidence of her appearance (a tooth impression in wax, her voice on a recording and a wax mold of her hand—found in a clear bowl of water—that even has her fingerprints inside). "Mary" also tells Constable he must abandon his work if he wants to continue to see her. After learning from a major general how valuable disrupting Constable's work would be to the Soviet Union (a motive for deception), the possibility of "Mary" being a real spirit begins to erode in Lauder's mind. He starts to pursue the possibility that everything connected to Mary's appearances may be generated by elaborate human-made illusions to guilt Constable into abandoning his research (which, unbeknownst to Constable was being used by the U.S. military), and defecting to work for the Soviets to equalize their power. In the end, Lauder and the counter-intelligence agents monitoring Constable uncover a plot from behind the Iron Curtain to get the Nobel-winning scientist to defect from the United States.

Daughter of the Mind was one of the first high-quality offerings of ABC's Movie of the Week series.

== Cast ==
- Don Murray as Alex Lauder
- Ray Milland as Professor Samuel Constable
- Gene Tierney as Lenore Constable
- Barbara Dana as Tina Cryder
- Edward Asner as Wiener
- Pamelyn Ferdin as Mary
- Ivor Barry as Dr. Cryder
- Virginia Christine as Helga
- George Macready as Dr. Frank Ferguson
- William Beckley as Arnold Bessimer
- John Carradine as Bosch
- Cecile Ozorio as Devi Bessimer
- Frank Maxwell as Augstadt
- Bill Hickman as Enemy Agent

== See also ==
- The Sixth Sense (1972 ABC TV series)
