= Thunder Birds (1942 film) =

1942 film by William A. Wellman

- Theatrical poster
- Directed by: William A. Wellman
- Screenplay by: Lamar Trotti
- Story by: Darryl F. Zanuck (as Melville Crossman)
- Produced by: Lamar Trotti
- Starring: Gene Tierney; Preston Foster; John Sutton; Jack Holt; Dame May Whitty
- Cinematography: Ernest Palmer
- Edited by: Walter Thompson
- Music by: David Buttolph
- Color process: Technicolor
- Production company: 20th Century Fox
- Distributed by: 20th Century Fox
- Release date: November 20, 1942
- Running time: 78 minutes
- Country: United States
- Language: English
- Box office: $1,250,000 (US rentals)

Thunder Birds (subtitled "Soldiers of the Air" and also known as Thunderbirds) is a 1942 Technicolor war drama film directed by William A. Wellman and starring Gene Tierney, Preston Foster, and John Sutton. It features aerial photography and location filming at an actual Arizona training base of the United States Army Air Forces named Thunderbird Field No. 1 during World War II.

The film was made as a propaganda vehicle to boost civilian morale, while at the same time providing a look at training activities and promoting airpower as a means of winning the war. Wellman was himself a veteran of the U.S. Air Service as a World War I fighter pilot.

== Plot ==
Soon after the US enters World War II, Steve Britt (Preston Foster), a former World War I flying ace, arrives at Thunderbird Field, looking for a job as a civilian primary flight instructor. The base commander is an old friend, Lt. Col. "Mac" MacDonald, working with Squadron Leader Barrett, who is in charge of the Royal Air Force cadets at the base.

Steve says he wants the job because he is too old for combat and the war will be won by pilots trained on bases like Thunderbird, but it is soon clear that he chose this base because his former girlfriend, Kay Saunders (Gene Tierney), lives nearby with her grandfather, retired Colonel Cyrus "Gramps" Saunders, also a close friend of Steve's.

Steve immediately flies to their ranch and performs stunts over a water tank where Kay is bathing, blowing her robe away and then dropping her his flying coveralls. When he lands, she seems miffed, but responds to his passionate kiss of greeting. Kay is still very fond of him, but no longer deeply in love.

Steve is introduced to the new class of RAF cadets, including Peter Stackhouse, whose father Steve knew. Mac warns Steve to "wash them out fast" if cadets cannot meet the requirements. Peter flies clumsily and is sick from acrophobia. After three such failures, Steve tries to persuade Peter to transfer, but Peter is confident he can overcome what he calls his "conditional reflex", and asks for more time.

Peter reveals the reason why he wants to fly. His brother was killed on a bombing mission and their grandmother, Lady Jane Stackhouse, summoned Peter, then an intern at a London hospital, home to show him the cheque she is sending Winston Churchill for the purchase of a new bomber to carry on the fight in Tom's memory. Since no male is left in the family to do so, Peter leaves his hospital service to enlist in the RAF to learn to fly. After hearing his story, Steve agrees to keep Peter in training.

On his first leave, Peter meets Kay Saunders and is immediately infatuated. She dates Peter, but warns him that she might still be in love with Steve. Still, her instincts warn her that Steve would make a poor husband, as he is a carefree nomad not interested in settling down. Peter admires Steve and is grateful to him, so he warns Steve that he is in love with Kay and intends to propose marriage. Steve promises that he will not wash Peter out because of their rivalry. His judgment tells him that Peter will one day be a fine pilot. When Squadron Leader Barrett gives Peter a check flight, he gets sick again. Steve stands by Peter in a showdown, threatening to resign.

Gramps throws a Fourth of July party for the cadets and, to help Steve win Kay, tricks Peter into riding a bucking bronco. This backfires when Peter proves to be an adept horseman. Steve sees that Kay has fallen in love with Peter, even before she realizes it herself.

The decision on Peter's training must be made. Steve tells Peter to fly the aircraft just as he rode the bronco, by easing up and relaxing. The advice works. Steve then forces Peter to fly solo by bailing out, although he descends into a sandstorm and is blown along the ground toward a cliff. Peter lands nearby and saves Steve, but the wind flips his aircraft over. Mac believes that Peter's incompetence caused the damage, washes him out, and fires Steve. Kay convinces Mac and Barrett to giving them one more chance. She tells Steve that she has decided to marry Peter, and reminds him of his own words about where the war will be won. Peter makes good on the faith shown in him, making a deadstick landing when his engine fails during his solo flight. Soon after, Steve, hobbling on a cane, greets an incoming class of new RAF cadets.

== Cast ==
- Gene Tierney as Kay Saunders
- Preston Foster as Steve Britt
- John Sutton as Peter Stackhouse
- Jack Holt as Lt. Col. "Mac" MacDonald
- Dame May Whitty as Lady Jane Stackhouse
- George Barbier as Col. Cyrus P. "Gramps" Saunders
- Richard Haydn as RAF cadet George Lockwood
- Reginald Denny as Squadron Leader Barrett
- Ted North as Cadet Hackzell (Note: Another cadet is Peter Lawford in an uncredited role.)
- Janis Carter as Blonde
- C. Montague Shaw as Doctor
- Viola Moore as Nurse
- Nana Bryant as Mrs. Blake
- Joyce Compton as Saleswoman
- Bess Flowers as Nurse
- Connie Leon as Ellen (uncredited)

== Production ==
Technicolor shots of aircraft at Thunderbird Field were the highlight of Thunder Birds.

Thunder Birds was intended by Fox studio chief Darryl F. Zanuck to be a follow-up to his popular A Yank in the R.A.F., given the working title of A Tommy in the U.S.A. Using the pen name "Melville Crossman," Zanuck himself wrote the original story. The studio also purchased rights to a magazine story entitled "Spitfire Squadron," written by Arch Whitehouse, but did not use it as part of the screenplay.

The Hollywood Reporter wrote that Dana Andrews would play the lead in Thunder Birds opposite Gene Tierney and that either Bruce Humberstone or Archie Mayo would direct.

William Wellman, however, agreed to direct in exchange for financial backing from Zanuck to film the novel The Ox-Bow Incident, which Wellman began immediately after production ended for Thunder Birds.

With cooperation from the United States Army Air Corps, production filming began on location at the actual Thunderbird Field No. 1 northwest of Glendale, Arizona, from mid-March to May 6, 1942. The storyline of international flight students, including Chinese trainees, revolved around cadets flying the Stearman PT-17 primary trainer, but also featured many live action formation flights of Vultee BT-13 Valiant and North American AT-6 trainers. Filming coincided with the time frame of the story. Additional sequences were filmed in the first week of June 1942 at the Falcon Field Training Facility in Mesa, Arizona, with retakes during July 1942. Stunt pilot Paul Mantz flew the live action flying scenes.

== Home media ==
20th Century Fox released Thunder Birds on June 6, 2006, as a Region 1 DVD, while in Region 2, it is available as part of a DVD box set of Gene Tierney's films for TCF.

== Reception ==
Thunder Birds received mixed reviews. The New York Times reviewer, Bosley Crowther critiqued the basic plot that "simply dished up another of those frightfully hackneyed tales, more to be censured than prettied, about an American instructor and a British flying cadet at the field who, in love with the same American lassie, vie to see which one can be the nobler goof."

Audiences liked the aerial scenes, which Crowther reported contained "many shots of basic trainers rolling and zooming on yellow wings against the blue. Those are the only exalting glimpses in the whole film." Film historians consider Thunder Birds a classic aviation film.
