= Hudson's Bay (film) =

1941 film by Irving Pichel

- Directed by: Irving Pichel
- Screenplay by: Lamar Trotti
- Based on: Pierre-Esprit Radisson (Incidents from the life of)
- Produced by: Darryl F. Zanuck
- Starring: Paul Muni; Gene Tierney; Laird Cregar; John Sutton
- Cinematography: George Barnes; J. Peverell Marley
- Edited by: Robert L. Simpson
- Music by: Alfred Newman
- Color process: Black and white
- Production company: 20th Century-Fox
- Distributed by: 20th Century-Fox
- Release dates: December 24, 1940 (Kansas City (limited)); December 28, 1940 (United States)
- Running time: 95 minutes
- Country: United States
- Language: English
- Budget: $869,600
- Box office: $1,395,300

Hudson's Bay is a 1940 American historical western adventure film directed by Irving Pichel and starring Paul Muni, Gene Tierney, Laird Cregar and John Sutton. Produced and distributed by 20th Century-Fox, the film is about a pair of French-Canadian explorers whose findings lead to the formation of the Hudson's Bay Company. In Canada, the film was heavily promoted by the Hudson's Bay Company through its retail stores.

== Plot ==
A trapper, Pierre Esprit Radisson, and his friend, nicknamed "Gooseberry," hope to open a trading post in the Hudson's Bay region of northeastern Canada in the year 1667.

They meet the jailed Lord Edward Crewe, a nobleman from England who has been banished from that country by Charles II of England. They manage to free Edward, who funds their expedition, beginning in Montreal, designed to further free trade with the Indians and make Canada a more united land.

Barbara Hall is the sweetheart of Edward and her brother, Gerald, is thrust upon them after the explorers travel to England to seek the king's favor. Prince Rupert helps get Edward back in the king's good graces. Charles II is open to the idea of a trading post, provided he is personally brought 400,000 pelts.

Gerald creates trouble in Canada as soon as the new Fort Charles trading post is established. His actions incite violence among the Indian natives, who demand he be punished. Over the king's objections and to Barbara's horror, Radisson and his associates permit Gerald to be sentenced to death by a firing squad.

But once the gravity of her brother's misdeeds become clear to her, and with the flourishing of the Hudson's Bay trading post, Barbara forgives her love Edward while his partners Radisson and Gooseberry celebrate their success.

== Cast ==
- Paul Muni as Pierre Esprit Radisson
- Gene Tierney as Barbara Hall
- Laird Cregar as Gooseberry
- John Sutton as Lord Edward Crewe
- Virginia Field as Nell Gwyn
- Vincent Price as Charles II
- Nigel Bruce as Prince Rupert
- Morton Lowry as Gerald Hall
- Robert Greig as Sir Robert
- Chief Thundercloud as Orimha
- Frederick Worlock as English Governor
- Florence Bates as Duchess
- Montagu Love as Marquis d'Argenson - Governor
- Ian Wolfe as Mayor
- Chief John Big Tree as Chief
- Jody Gilbert as Germaine

== Reception ==
George MacDonald Fraser wrote in 1988, "Hudson's Bay paid the penalty for being ahead of its time; critics found it boring, and one described it as 'a cock-eyed history lesson' which, overall, it certainly is not." MacDonald goes on to say of Vincent Price in the role of the King, "Here was an actor who looked reasonably like Old Rowley, and combined the languid style with the athletic presence - one could imagine Price walking ten miles a day for the fun of it as King Charles did."

=== Box office ===
The film earned a profit of $88,500.

== Radio ==
The same story was serialised for Australian radio in 1946 as Hudson's Bay starring Grant Taylor and Max Osbiston.
