= Washington Melodrama =

1941 film by S. Sylvan Simon

- Directed by: S. Sylvan Simon
- Written by: L. Du Rocher Macpherson
- Screenplay by: Marion Parsonnet; Roy Chanslor
- Produced by: Edgar Selwyn
- Starring: Frank Morgan; Ann Rutherford; Kent Taylor; Anne Gwynne; Dan Dailey
- Cinematography: Harold Rosson
- Edited by: Gene Ruggiero
- Music by: David Snell
- Production company: Metro-Goldwyn-Mayer
- Distributed by: Loew's Inc.
- Release date: April 18, 1941
- Running time: 80 minutes
- Country: United States
- Language: English

Washington Melodrama is a 1941 American drama film directed by S. Sylvan Simon and starring Frank Morgan, Ann Rutherford, and Kent Taylor. It was produced in Hollywood by major studio Metro-Goldwyn-Mayer.

== Plot ==
It is 1941 and the United States remains at an uneasy peace. Prominent Washington, D.C. industrialist turned philanthropist Calvin Claymore is the prime force behind a proposed Senate bill to feed the starving children of war-ravaged Europe. He is fiercely opposed by brash young newspaper publisher Hal Thorne, who fears the food will end up hijacked by the fascist militaries.

One evening after a draining committee meeting, Claymore receives a doleful call from his wife informing him that rather than returning home she and his only child, daughter Laurie, will continue their extended globe-hopping several more months. Heartsick, he seeks to retire quietly to his home, as has become his lamented custom. His retreat is foiled by his well-meaning secretary, who recruits a high-spirited U.S. Senator that cajoles his old pal into going to an unusually frisky nightclub.

There Claymore makes the acquaintance of a very attractive young girl from an entertainment troupe performing both dance and water ballet numbers, Mary Morgan. He is a gentleman in every way throughout the evening with her, but in his loneliness bidding her goodnight he asks if he can see her again. She agrees, and they innocently spend a happy summer exploring the sights and public highlights of the Capital. As the season comes to an end neither wants their friendship to wane with it, but Claymore receives a cable that his wife and daughter are returning imminently, so he pays a respectful farewell visit to Mary at her apartment. Tucked inside a warm personal note he leaves behind are several thousand dollar bills, so she can enjoy "some of the nice things in life" she has dreamt aloud of. Unwilling to accept the generous, yet innocent, gesture, she vows to return it.

All the while nightclub MC Whitney King has been waiting to pounce. It turns out his angle in ensuring his girls are literally "hooked" by wealthy men was extortion. He first tries to strongarm Mary into turning over the cash to him. She resists, they struggle, and he accidentally knocks her head over heels into the fireplace, killing her. Searching her apartment for the money he turns up both it and what now can be regarded as an incriminating note. Immediately, he blackmails Claymore, who pays heavily to keep himself free of scandal in order to remain the moving force of his do-gooder initiative.

Upon his wife and daughter's return Claymore is confronted with the renewed relationship of Laurie with his antagonist, Thorne. The very first evening he generously concedes to their engagement, but is immediately drawn back into conflict with him over the pending aid proposal.

Meanwhile, one of the gloves Claymore had worn to Mary's apartment that last evening has been dug up at her apartment by one of Thorne's reporters, triggering a search for the other glove and its owner - the presumed murderer. Thorne's paper drums it into a frenzy, gripping the city - and its D.A..

Claymore confesses his summer dalliance to both his wife and daughter, convincing them of his innocence in Mary's death. Seeing his struggle, and what losing the aid bill will do to him and the desperate children of Europe, each finds their own route to rallying behind him. Meanwhile, the D.A. begins to close in. Seeing this, Thorne is finally willing to put both his political differences with Claymore and his zealous role as a newspaper crusader to the side, helping him hide the incriminating glove falsely tying him to the murder from the prosecutor.

Later that evening Laurie decides to turn detective, and, posing as an adventurous French coquette, shortly becomes hooked up with the dangerous King. Discovering the pair together sends his tempestuous girlfriend and dance partner Teddy Carlyle into a jealous rage. Buying time to learn more about his role, Laurie helps him talk his way out of it.

Caught with Laurie a second time the same night by Teddy, King tries to wriggle free, but she threatens to turn him into the authorities. Infuriated, he shoots her point blank. Rushed to the hospital, she stonewalls both the D.A. and Laurie. Begged to tell the truth "for the children", she relents and fingers King as Mary's murderer with her last breath.

The next morning Claymore is set to testify before the Senate in support of his charity proposal. The family is reunited as one, and father and future son-in-law warmly embrace one-another - yet vow to still fight like cats and dogs over the bill.

== Cast ==
- Frank Morgan as Calvin Claymore
- Ann Rutherford as Laurie Claymore
- Kent Taylor as Hal Thorne
- Dan Dailey as Whitney King
- Lee Bowman as Ronnie Clayton
- Fay Holden as Mrs. (Calvin) Claymore
- Virginia Grey as Teddy Carlyle
- Anne Gwynne Sara Haden... Mrs. Harrington
- Olaf Hytten as Parry
- Douglass Dumbrille as Donnelly
- Cliff Clark as Simpson
- Hal K. Dawson as Logan
- Thurston Hall as Senator Morton
- Joseph Crehan as Phil Sampson
- Frederick Burton as Dean Lawford
- Howard Hickman as Bishop Chatterton
- Virginia Brissac as Mrs. Curzonas Mary Morgan

== Bibliography ==
- Fetrow, Alan G. Feature Films, 1940-1949: a United States Filmography. McFarland, 1994.
