= Sobey Martin =

American film director

Sobey Martin (27 June 1909 – 27 July 1978) was an American director of television and short films, primarily in the 1950s and 1960s. Martin directed the film Four Nights of the Full Moon (Spanish: Las cuatro noches de la luna llena) (1963), starring an international ensemble cast led by Gene Tierney. However, he is probably best remembered for his prolific work on the Irwin Allen TV series Lost in Space, The Time Tunnel, Voyage to the Bottom of the Sea and Land of the Giants.

== Selected filmography ==
- Freddy in the Wild West (1964)
