= You're My Everything (film) =

1949 film by Walter Lang

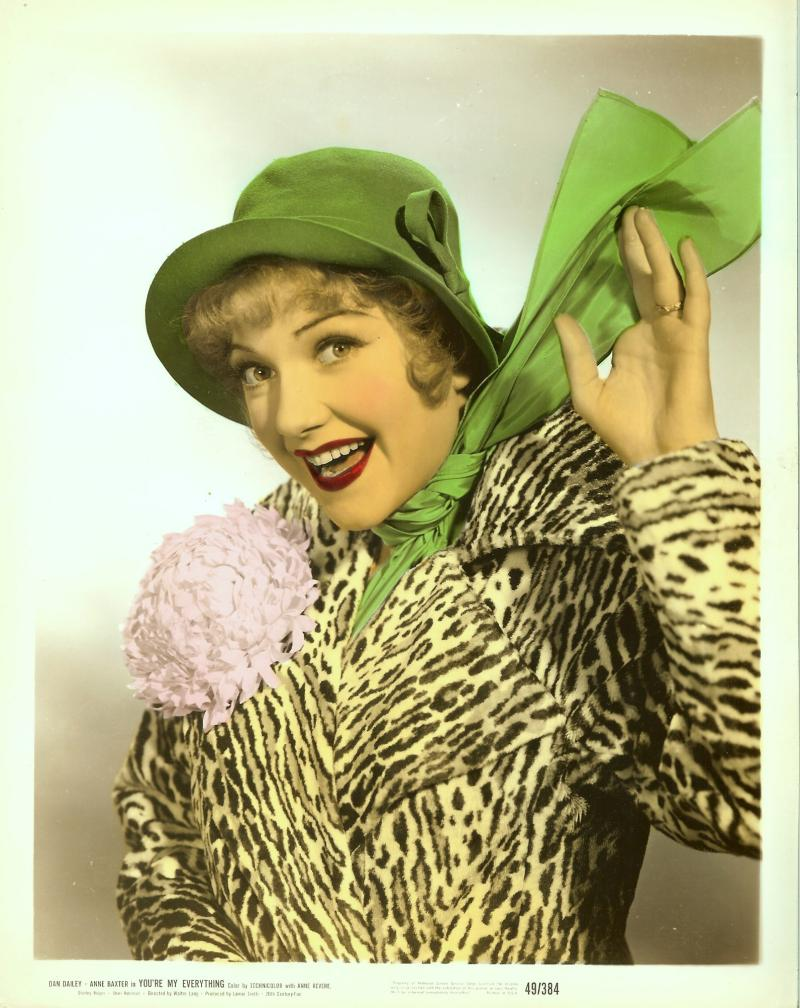
- Promotional photograph of Anne Baxter for the film
- Directed by: Walter Lang
- Screenplay by: Lamar Trotti; Will H. Hays, Jr.
- Story by: George Jessel
- Produced by: Lamar Trotti
- Starring: Dan Dailey; Anne Baxter
- Cinematography: Arthur E. Arling
- Edited by: J. Watson Webb, Jr.
- Music by: Alfred Newman
- Color process: Technicolor
- Production company: Twentieth Century-Fox
- Distributed by: Twentieth Century-Fox
- Release date: July 22, 1949 (New York)
- Running time: 94 minutes
- Country: United States
- Language: English
- Box office: $2.4 million

You're My Everything is a 1949 American comedy musical film directed by Walter Lang and starring Dan Dailey and Anne Baxter.

== Plot ==
In 1924 Boston, a starstruck Hannah Adams waits outside in the rain to meet Tim O'Connor, who has just performed in a musical on stage. She invites him home to meet her family, and soon they are in love and engaged to be married.

Tim is offered a Hollywood screen test, and Hannah is asked to read with him. However, it is she who is offered a contract following the test, and she becomes a star in silent films. At the advent of sound, she retires to have a baby and live with Tim on a farm.

Tim takes their daughter Jane to studio chief Henry Mercer when a child's role in a film becomes available. Hannah hesitantly agrees to permit her daughter to appear in just one film, but Tim conceals the fact that Jane has been offered a three-film contract. The conflict threatens to fracture the family.

== Cast ==
- Dan Dailey as Timothy O'Connor
- Anne Baxter as Hannah Adams
- Anne Revere as Aunt Jane
- Stanley Ridges as Mr. Henry Mercer
- Shari Robinson as Jane O'Connor
- Henry O'Neill as Prof. Adams
- Selena Royle as Mrs. Adams
- Alan Mowbray as Joe Blanton
- Robert Arthur as Harold
- Buster Keaton as Butler

== Production ==
Jeanne Crain and Dan Dailey were announced as the leads in August 1948, with filming scheduled for October, but Crain's pregnancy caused her to withdraw from the project in September, with her role given to Anne Baxter. However, Baxter had never danced in a feature film and took a rushed set of Charleston lessons to prepare. She also researched the professional and personal life of Clara Bow, from whom the Hannah Adams character is patterned the film.

By October, the role of Jane had not been cast and the producers were frantically searching for a child actress to play the part, but nine-year-old Shari Robinson was selected from among more than 100 girls who tested for the role. The search was considered the studio's effort to identify the next Shirley Temple, and Robinson's hair was lightened and curled for the film in order to resemble a young Temple. Although Twentieth Century-Fox insisted that the role of Jane was not intended to mimic Temple, Robinson performs Temple's signature song "On the Good Ship Lollipop" in the film.

Production began in mid-November 1948 and wrapped in January 1949.

== Release ==
You're My Everything was afforded a lavish gala premiere at Grauman's Chinese Theatre on June 29, 1949, reportedly Hollywood's grandest premiere in 10 years, as the lavish premieres of the 1920s and 1930s had given way to quieter events during and after World War II. As part of the spectacle, Baxter drove down Hollywood Boulevard to the theater in the 1910 Ford seen in the film, and a 20-piece band played songs from the film in front of the theater.

== Reception ==
In a contemporary review for The New York Times, critic Bosley Crowther wrote: "Having made itself famous and monotonous with its series of backstage musicals about vaudeville hoofers, song-writers and Betty Grables who 'arrive' on Broadway, Twentieth Century-Fox suddenly figured to look behind its own scenes for the atmosphere and the makings of a nostalgic musical show. And, by George, it couldn't have done better, for it has come up in 'You're My Everything' with a bright spoof of Hollywood careerdom."

== Radio adaptation ==
You're My Everything was first presented on the radio in a one-hour adaptation starring Baxter and Phil Harris on Lux Radio Theatre on November 27, 1950. Harris was a last-minute replacement for Dailey, who was ill. The story was repeated on Lux Radio Theatre on February 23, 1953, starring Dailey and Jeanne Crain.
