= Four Nights of the Full Moon =

1963 film by Sobey Martin

- Spanish: Las Cuatro Noches de la Luna Llena
- Directed by: Sobey Martin
- Produced by: Sobey Martin
- Starring: Gene Tierney; Dan Dailey; Analía Gadé
- Cinematography: Juan Marine
- Distributed by: Documento Films
- Release date: 1963
- Country: United States
- Languages: English; Spanish

Four Nights of the Full Moon (Spanish: Las Cuatro Noches de la Luna Llena) is a 1963 American film directed by Sobey Martin. It features an international ensemble cast, including Gene Tierney, Dan Dailey, and Analía Gadé.

This film is considered a lost film. During production, they ran out of money, and the project was shortened for television. The final print of this production has been lost.

== Cast ==
- Gene Tierney
- Dan Dailey
- Analía Gadé
- Don Jaime de Mora y Aragón
- Perla Cristal
- Niní Montián
