= I Can Get It for You Wholesale (film) =

1951 film by Michael Gordon

- Original poster
- Directed by: Michael Gordon
- Written by: Abraham Polonsky; Vera Caspary; Based on the novel by Jerome Weidman
- Produced by: Sol C. Siegel
- Starring: Susan Hayward; Dan Dailey; George Sanders
- Cinematography: Milton R. Krasner
- Edited by: Robert L. Simpson
- Music by: Sol Kaplan
- Distributed by: Twentieth Century Fox
- Release dates: April 4, 1951 (New York); April 18, 1951 (Los Angeles)
- Running time: 91 minutes
- Country: United States
- Language: English
- Box office: $1,425,000 (US rental)

I Can Get It for You Wholesale is a 1951 American romantic drama film directed by Michael Gordon. The screenplay by Abraham Polonsky is based on Vera Caspary's loose adaptation of the 1937 novel of the same title by Jerome Weidman.

== Plot ==
In New York City's garment district, ambitious model and fashion designer Harriet Boyd, production manager Sam Cooper and salesman Teddy Sherman leave their firm to start their own business that specializes in $10.95 dresses. Their plans are temporarily derailed when Harriet's mother refuses to give her the insurance payment that the family received when her father died, having promised it to Harriet's younger sister Marge for her wedding. Harriet dupes Marge and her fiancé Ray into giving her the money, and Sherboyco Dresses opens for business.

Teddy, who has fallen in love with Harriet, is dismayed when she flirts with lecherous buyer Mr. Savage during a business dinner, so he proposes marriage. She declines his offer, telling him that she enjoys her freedom. Her refusal prompts Teddy to try to extract himself from their partnership, but he discovers that their contract is ironclad.

Harriet begins dating J. F. Noble, the owner of a chain of upscale department stores, who wants her to quit and work exclusively for him. Her uncertainty puts her on edge, and when Teddy discusses her change in attitude, she claims that she is stressed by overwork and wants to quit. Teddy repeats his offer of marriage and Harriet now reconsiders. She visits Noble to decline his offer, but Teddy interrupts their meeting, misunderstands her motives and mistakenly believes that her behavior was a ploy designed to lead the way to her departure from Sherboyco. Heartbroken and angry, Teddy departs, and soon after, he leaves town for a sales trip. During his absence, Harriet shifts money from Sherboyco to a new company that she is founding, stops production on Sherboyco's dresses and begins designing for Noble's department stores.

Unaware of what has happened, Teddy continues to take orders for Sherboyco's popular low-cost womenswear while on the road. He does not learn about Harriet's deception until buyer Hermione Griggs contacts him about an order that she has not received. Harriet tries to convince her Sherboyco partners that it is in their best interest to align with her at Noble's company, but Sam and Teddy prefer to declare bankruptcy rather than join forces with the competition. Harriet prepares to sail to Paris with Noble, but at the last moment, she realizes that her commitment to Sam and Teddy is too important to ignore. She returns to Sherboyco, where she admits that she loves Teddy and asks him and Sam to forgive her.

== Cast ==
- Susan Hayward as Harriet Boyd
- Dan Dailey as Teddy Sherman
- George Sanders as J.F. Noble
- Sam Jaffe as Sam Cooper
- Randy Stuart as Marge Boyd
- Marvin Kaplan as Arnold Fisher
- Harry von Zell as Savage
- Barbara Whiting as Ellen Cooper
- Vicki Cummings as Hermione Griggs
- Ross Elliott as Ray
- Richard Lane as Kelley
- Mary Philips as Mrs. Boyd

== Production ==
The protagonist of Weidman's novel had been an ambitious businessman, but his gender was changed to accommodate Twentieth Century-Fox contract player Susan Hayward.

== Release ==
The film was released in the United Kingdom as This Is My Affair. When it was broadcast on American television in 1962, the film's title was changed to Only the Best to avoid confusion with the stage musical based on Weidman's novel that was running on Broadway at the time.

== Reception ==
In a contemporary review for The New York Times, critic Thomas M. Pryor wrote:

Within the story framework laid out by Miss Caspary, Mr. Polonsky has written some crisp, double-edged dialogue, but the flavor of the garment industry never is really exploited. This is regrettable because the chief distinction in the way of freshness the picture has to offer are the scenes which reflect the pulse beat of the dress industry—the crowds scurrying along Seventh Avenue amid the traffic of dress carts and the frenetic atmosphere of the showrooms where the buyers are not only baited with dresses but blandishments as well. The camera roves excitingly through this fabulous, hurly-burly in the picture's opening sequences, but too soon director Michael Gordon has to face the business of telling the story of a pert young lady who is determined to climb to the top of the heap ... With less whitewash and more honesty, "I Can Get It for You Wholesale" could have been an exciting, instead of just an average good, entertainment."

Critic Philip K. Scheuer of the Los Angeles Times wrote: "'I Can Get It for You Wholesale' does to the garment industry what 'All About Eve' did to show business. I say 'to' rather than 'for' because the prevailing mood is one of disenchantment. In fact, it's downright crackling in its bitterness. The result may be entertainment with a sneer but it's certainly entertainment—and educational, too."

== Adaptations ==
Hayward and Dailey reprised their film roles for a Lux Radio Theatre broadcast on March 31, 1952.
