= Belle Starr (1941 film) =

1941 film

- Theatrical release poster
- Directed by: Irving Cummings
- Screenplay by: Lamar Trotti
- Story by: Niven Busch; Cameron Rogers
- Produced by: Kenneth Macgowan
- Starring: Randolph Scott; Gene Tierney; Dana Andrews; Shepperd Strudwick
- Cinematography: Ernest Palmer; Ray Rennahan
- Edited by: Robert Simpson
- Music by: Alfred Newman
- Production company: 20th Century Fox
- Distributed by: 20th Century Fox
- Release date: September 12, 1941
- Running time: 87 minutes
- Country: United States
- Language: English

Belle Starr is a 1941 American Western film directed by Irving Cummings and produced by Kenneth Macgowan for 20th Century Fox. It stars Gene Tierney as Belle Starr, alongside Randolph Scott, Dana Andrews, and Shepperd Strudwick. The screenplay by Lamar Trotti is based on a story by Niven Busch and Cameron Rogers, adapted from Rogers's 1927 article and subsequent book Gallant Ladies.

Filmed in Technicolor, the film was the first major Hollywood production to portray the 19th-century outlaw Belle Starr, known for her criminal associations. Production faced casting changes and delays due to Tierney's health issues, but its eventual success contributed to the romanticized cinematic depictions of the Old West.

== Plot ==
At the end of the Civil War, Belle Shirley is reunited with her brother Ed and intends to continue the fight for the South, of which she is a part. She defends Sam Starr, a rebel who won't defend himself against Major Grail, a Yankee and friend of her brother's from before the war, who wants to find Belle's love again. Ed invites him to dinner at their rich estate, but that's when Sam Starr turns up, having heard what Belle has to say about him. She's not averse to talking to him. A horse thief who has had dealings with Belle in the past warns the army and Captain Starr has to leave but is wounded. His loyal lieutenant, Blue Dock, takes him back to Belle, who tries to do everything she can to protect him with the arrival of the Major. But the Major not only arrests the rebel, but also Ed, before burning down Belle's house.

Mad with rage, she wants revenge and to lead the fight in the South, so she joins the rebels. She organises the escape of the captain and her brother, who prefers to return to the city, while his sister joins Sam Starr's ranks for good. Together they set out to reconquer Missouri, driving out the northerners before marrying and becoming the leaders of the rebellion, with a price on their heads.

One day, the Cole brothers, renowned assassins, join their ranks. The captain goes on an expedition with them without Belle. When her husband has not yet returned, Belle is visited by her brother, who warns her of the actions of these expeditions, which rob and kill at the instigation of the new recruits, who mercilessly slaughter him without his sister noticing. In her grief she learns from her husband that he has done this kind of thing, and when she offers to take him to Texas he refuses, wanting to carry out one last mission to kidnap a governor. Seeing their differences, she gives him back his ring and flees. She intends to turn herself in and, to protect him, denounce him to the northerners, but she learns from her nurse that this is a trap for the captain. Belle runs to warn him, telling her nurse that she will always love him despite what he has done, but is shot in her tracks by the horse thief who wants the reward. The captain turns back, believing that it was Blue Duck who fired the shot to warn him. In front of the assassin, he denies that the body is that of his wife so that the thief doesn't get the money, and the Major lets him do it, saddened by the death of the woman he has always loved. The captain places her ring on her finger before hearing slaves say that she is a legend and that she is not dead, like a fox.

== Cast ==
- Randolph Scott as Sam Starr
- Gene Tierney as Belle Shirley / Belle Starr
- Dana Andrews as Maj. Thomas Crail
- John Shepperd as Ed Shirley
- Elizabeth Patterson as Sarah
- Chill Wills as Blue Duck
- Louise Beavers as Mammy Lou
- Olin Howland as Jasper Trench
- Paul Burns as Sergeant
- Joseph Sawyer as John Cole
- Joseph Downing as Jim Cole
- Howard C. Hickman as Col. Thornton
- Charles Trowbridge as Col. Bright
- James Flavin as Sergeant
- Charles Middleton as Carpetbagger

== Background ==
The film was produced by 20th Century Fox in response to the success of MGM's Gone with the Wind (1939). Styled as a romanticized Technicolor biopic, it portrayed the life of Old West outlaw queen Belle Starr, born Myra Maybelle Shirley on February 5, 1848, near Medoc, Missouri. While Starr's exploits with outlaws such as the Younger Brothers and Jesse James are legendary, little in the film corresponds to historical accounts. Starr's criminal activities reportedly began after her marriage to Sam Starr, a Cherokee, in 1880, and her death in 1889 remains shrouded in mystery.

The project was inspired by an article titled "Belle Starr, the Gadfly of the South," written by Cameron Rogers and first published in Pictorial Review in February 1927, later included in Rogers's book Gallant Ladies. 20th Century Fox acquired the story rights and employed screenwriters Harvey F. Thew, John L. Balderston, and Sonya Levien for treatments or outlines, although their contributions to the final script are unclear. The completed film credits Rogers and Niven Busch with the story. Studio records indicate disputes over screen credit were mediated by the Screen Writers Guild.

Initially, Roy Del Ruth and Alice Faye were set to direct and star, respectively, but both were reassigned to other projects. Actress Gene Tierney was ultimately cast in the title role after extensive auditions involving other stars such as Barbara Stanwyck, Joan Crawford, and Paulette Goddard. During production, Tierney suffered from angioedema, which delayed filming, forcing the studio to shoot around her absence. Costar Randolph Scott waived payment for idle days, helping to keep the production on track.

The film was shot on location in Missouri and Southern California, including Joplin, the Santa Susana Mountains, and the Iverson Ranch. It marked the first billing of actor Shepperd Strudwick as "John Shepperd", a change made by studio executives for marketing purposes. Publicity for the film included cross-promotional trailers with other Fox productions, though one featuring Tierney was ultimately not produced.

Legal disputes arose during production, including threats of litigation from Belle Starr's granddaughter, Flossie E. Hutton, over the depiction of her grandmother's life. The studio's actions regarding these claims are not documented. The film's title card described Starr as "The Bandit Queen", further emphasizing the romanticized approach taken by the filmmakers.

== Reception ==
Denis Saurat, reviewing for The Guardian, commended Belle Starr for its dignified blend of Western and historical romance but noted it lacks the genre's usual vitality. He praised the Technicolor, music, Randolph Scott's performance, and Gene Tierney's spirited portrayal, lamenting her earlier underappreciation.

== See also ==
- Belle Starr's Daughter - 1948 American Western film
