= There's No Business Like Show Business (film) =

1954 musical-comedy drama directed by Walter Lang

Irving Berlin's There's No Business Like Show Business
- Theatrical release poster
- Directed by: Walter Lang
- Screenplay by: Phoebe Ephron; Henry Ephron
- Story by: Lamar Trotti
- Produced by: Sol C. Siegel
- Starring: Ethel Merman; Donald O'Connor; Marilyn Monroe; Dan Dailey; Johnnie Ray; Mitzi Gaynor
- Cinematography: Leon Shamroy
- Edited by: Robert Simpson
- Music by: Irving Berlin
- Production company: 20th Century Fox
- Distributed by: 20th Century Fox
- Release dates: December 16, 1954 (New York City, premiere); December 24, 1954 (Los Angeles)
- Running time: 117 minutes
- Country: United States
- Language: English
- Budget: $4.3 million
- Box office: $5.1 million (US/Canadian rentals)

Irving Berlin's There's No Business Like Show Business is a 1954 American musical comedy-drama film directed by Walter Lang. It stars Ethel Merman, Donald O'Connor, Marilyn Monroe, Dan Dailey, Johnnie Ray, and Mitzi Gaynor.

The title is borrowed from the song in the stage musical (and MGM film) Annie Get Your Gun. The screenplay was written by Phoebe Ephron and Henry Ephron, based on a story by Lamar Trotti; and the movie was Fox's first musical in CinemaScope and DeLuxe Color.

O'Connor later called the film the best picture he ever made.

== Plot ==
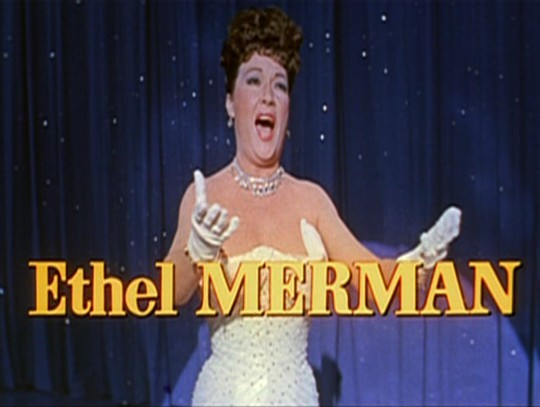
Ethel Merman as Molly

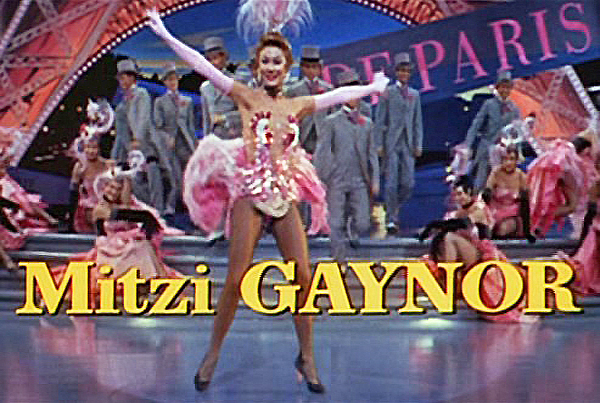
Mitzi Gaynor as Katy

In 1919, Terence and Molly Donahue are a husband-and-wife vaudeville team. By 1923, their children Steve, Katy, and Tim have joined the act, with the troupe billed as The Five Donahues. As the children mature, Terence and Molly enroll them in a Catholic boarding school in Boston. One Saturday, as their parents are performing, Steve and Tim attempt to leave but are caught by Father Dineen. The priest sends a telegram to Terence and Molly saying the boys miss their parents and performing, but says they are capable of becoming leaders. Molly, however, insists the children stay enrolled.

The family moves to New Jersey. In October 1929, the stock market crashes and the theatre stock company drops the Donahues in favor of motion pictures. Terence and Molly take whatever jobs they can find, including performing a carnival act and singing radio advertisements. Before long, movie theaters begin providing live entertainment before screenings, and the Five Donahues are performing once again.

In 1937, Tim has graduated from high school, Katy becomes a dancer, and Steve develops a talent for singing. After a live performance, Tim and Katy sneak out on separate dates at Gallagher's nightclub, worrying Molly and Terence. At the club, Tim dates older "chorus girl" Lillian Sawyer while Katy dates Eddie Dugan. Tim meets with aspiring performer Victoria "Vicky" Hoffman who performs a solo number. Impressed, Tim arrives at Vicky's dressing room, and pretends to be a journalist for Variety. Eddie and talent agent Lew Harris also arrive at the dressing room, where Vicky learns Tim is part of the Five Donahues. She dismisses him in favor of talking with Eddie and Lew.

Back home, Steve tells the family he has decided to become a priest. Terence is disappointed at his son's decision, but their discussion is interrupted by Tim, who has returned home drunk. Eventually, the family comes to terms with Steve's decision, and throws him a farewell party. The troupe, now billed as The Four Donahues, accepts an engagement in Florida where Tim meets up with Vicky (now billed as Vicky Parker) during rehearsal. Tim allows her to perform a tropical-themed musical number that was to be performed by his family. Eventually, Tim falls in love with her, though Vicky declines his romantic advances.

The next morning, Vicky calls the Donahues and tells them Lew Harris is arranging a Broadway show with her as the star. She wants Tim and Katy to join her. Molly, despite her prior irritation over Vicky using their tropical-themed number, agrees to let them do the show. During rehearsals, Katy begins dating Charlie Gibbs, the show's lyricist, and marries him after Steve has been ordained into the priesthood.

Tim continues courting Vicky, but becomes angry when she arrives late for an evening dinner after disagreeing with Lew Harris over a costume change. Tim accuses Vicky of being romantically involved with Lew, gets drunk, and later gets into a car accident. Before opening night, Lew considers cancelling the show, but hires Molly to take Tim's place. Meanwhile, Terence visits Tim at the hospital where the two have an argument. The next morning, Molly and Terence arrive at the hospital to see Tim; however, the nurse hands them a note from Tim saying he has gone but with no indication of where he might be. Molly and Terence open a missing persons investigation and attend various nightclubs looking for him, to no avail.

On the closing night of the Hippodrome Theatre, Steve unexpectedly arrives backstage in the uniform of an Army chaplain. As he and Katy watch from the wings, Molly performs the film's title song. Moments before the song ends, Tim shows up wearing a U.S. sailor uniform and is embraced by Katy, Steve and his parents. Tim reconciles with his family, and for the first time in years, the Five Donahues reunite for the elaborate finale.

== Cast ==
- Ethel Merman as Molly Donahue
- Donald O'Connor as Timothy "Tim" Donahue
- Marilyn Monroe as Victoria "Vicky" Parker
- Dan Dailey as Terence "Terry" Donahue
- Johnnie Ray as Steven "Steve" Donahue
- Mitzi Gaynor as Katherine "Katy" Donahue
- Richard Eastham as Lew Harris
- Hugh O'Brian as Charles "Charlie" Gibbs
- Frank McHugh as Eddie Dugan
- Rhys Williams as Father Dineen
- Lee Patrick as Marge
- Eve Miller as hatcheck girl
- Robin Raymond as Lillian Sawyer

== Soundtrack ==
All songs written by Irving Berlin.

Song	Performer(s)	Note(s)
"When the Midnight Choo-Choo Leaves for Alabam'"	Sung by Ethel Merman and Dan Dailey	Later performed by Mitzi Gaynor and Donald O'Connor
"Play a Simple Melody"	Sung by Ethel Merman and Dan Dailey	–
"A Pretty Girl Is Like a Melody"	Sung by Ethel Merman with Dan Dailey; Danced by Dan Dailey	–
"You'd Be Surprised"	Dan Dailey	–
"Let's Have Another Cup of Coffee"	Sung by Ethel Merman	–
"Alexander's Ragtime Band"	The cast	Later sung by Ethel Merman, Dan Dailey, Donald O'Connor, Mitzi Gaynor and Johnnie Ray
"Puttin' On the Ritz"	–	Instrumental performed by the nightclub orchestra
"After You Get What You Want You Don't Want It"	Marilyn Monroe	–
"Remember"	Sung by the cast	Later sung by Ethel Merman and Dan Dailey
"If You Believe"	Sung by Johnnie Ray	–
"Heat Wave"	Marilyn Monroe	George Chakiris appears as a dancer
"A Man Chases a Girl (Until She Catches Him)"	Sung by Donald O'Connor and Marilyn Monroe; Danced by Donald O'Connor	–
"Lazy"	Marilyn Monroe, Mitzi Gaynor and Donald O'Connor	–
"A Sailor's Not a Sailor ('Til a Sailor's Been Tattooed)"	Sung by Ethel Merman and Mitzi Gaynor	–
"Marie"	Performed by an uncredited male trio on a nightclub's stage when the family is searching for Tim	–
"There's No Business Like Show Business"	Ethel Merman	Later sung by the cast

== Production ==
Before the film's production, Marilyn Monroe had been placed on suspension from 20th Century-Fox after refusing to accept the leading role in a film version of a Broadway musical titled The Girl in Pink Tights. During her suspension, she married baseball star Joe DiMaggio and the two honeymooned in Japan, during which time she entertained American soldiers in Korea. Fox had intended to cast Sheree North in There's No Business Like Show Business, going so far as to screen-test North in Monroe's own studio wardrobe. When Monroe returned to California, her Fox suspension was lifted, and studio executives offered her a role in the ensemble cast of There's No Business Like Show Business as a replacement project for having refused to make Pink Tights. Monroe initially refused to make There's No Business Like Show Business just as she had for the previous project until Fox assured her that her next vehicle would be The Seven Year Itch. She also demanded a pay increase of $3,000 a week.

Irving Berlin was paid $500,000 for the film.

Ethel Merman had first sung "There's No Business Like Show Business" in the original Broadway production of Annie Get Your Gun in 1946 and would go on to sing it again in the 1967 television broadcast of the subsequent Lincoln Center revival of that musical comedy.

== Release ==
To publicize the film, Monroe wore a black cotton polka-dot swimsuit. It went on auction at Christie's in London in 1991 and sold for $22,400 to collector David Gainsborough Roberts.

== Reception ==
=== Box office ===
During its second weekend, There's No Business Like Show Business was the number-one box office film, screening in 17 key cities. It held the number-one position a week later before it was displaced by 20,000 Leagues Under the Sea (1954) during its fourth weekend. By January 1956, There's No Business Like Show Business earned $5 million in estimated box office sales from the United States and Canada. However, the film's negative cost was $4.3 million, and Variety reported the film needed to earn $6.5 million to break even.

=== Critical reaction ===
On the review aggregator website Rotten Tomatoes, 67% of 12 critics' reviews are positive.

Bosley Crowther of The New York Times called the film a "major success", in which he praised Donald O'Connor's performance in particular. He also noted that Mitzi Gaynor had surpassed Monroe's "wriggling and squirming" which were "embarrassing to behold." Harrison's Reports praised the film, calling it "a feast to the eye, the ear and the heart. It is a delightful mixture of Irving Berlin's popular songs, intimate and spectacular production numbers, heartwarming comedy and human interest, adding up to a musical extravaganza that is one of the top entertainments of the year". Abel Green of Variety praised Ethel Merman as "a belter of a school of song stylists not to be found on every stage or before every mike" and Dan Dailey "an effective actor" with "polish and conviction." Monroe's "Heat Wave" number was described as needing to "be seen to be appreciated", while noting she's "more competitive to Mae West in her delineating." Television host Ed Sullivan described Monroe's performance of the song "Heat Wave" as "one of the most flagrant violations of good taste" he had witnessed.

A review in Time magazine called the film "an Irving Berlin potpourri, containing some good old sweetmeats along with a few fresh-picked sour apples." Gaynor was noted as having "a finely machined set of ball bearings, becomingly encased, and Marilyn Monroe will undoubtedly singe the eyebrows off front-row patrons in her Heat Wave number, in which she bumps and grinds as expressively as the law will allow." Edwin Schallert of the Los Angeles Times felt: "Those who like Miss Merman—and that will be New Yorkers or the New York-minded especially—will feel that this is one of her most sterling efforts, and that she and Dailey form a first-rate mature team. Miss Gaynor, who is away out in front, and O'Connor are also splendidly matched." He was more critical of Monroe's performance, writing "there is much stress on this to the point where much of the time she seems almost inarticulate."

=== Accolades ===
Date of ceremony	Award	Category	Recipients and nominees	Result
February 25, 1955	Writers Guild of America Awards	Best Written Musical	Phoebe Ephron, Henry Ephron	Nominated
March 30, 1955	Academy Awards	Best Original Score – Musical	Alfred Newman, Lionel Newman	Nominated
March 30, 1955	Academy Awards	Best Story	Lamar Trotti (posthumous nomination)	Nominated
March 30, 1955	Academy Awards	Best Costume Design – Color	Charles LeMaire, Travilla, Miles White	Nominated

The film is recognized by American Film Institute in these lists:

- 2006: AFI's Greatest Movie Musicals – Nominated
