= Taxi (1953 film) =

1953 film by Gregory Ratoff

- Directed by: Gregory Ratoff
- Screenplay by: D. M. Marshman, Jr.; Daniel Fuchs
- Story by: Hans Jacoby; Fred Brady
- Based on: "Sans laisser d'adresse" by Alex Joffé and Jean-Paul Le Chanois
- Produced by: Samuel G. Engel
- Starring: Dan Dailey; Constance Smith
- Cinematography: Milton Krasner
- Edited by: Hugh S. Fowler
- Music by: Leigh Harline
- Distributed by: 20th Century-Fox
- Release dates: January 21, 1953 (New York City); March 4, 1953 (Los Angeles)
- Running time: 77 minutes
- Country: United States
- Language: English
- Budget: $820,000

Taxi is a 1953 American drama film directed by Gregory Ratoff and starring Dan Dailey. It was distributed by 20th Century-Fox.

== Plot ==
Taxi driver Ed Nielson is a bad-tempered bachelor who lives with his mother and owes money on his cab.

On a day when things are going wrong, Ed picks up a steamship passenger, Mary Turner, arriving from Ireland, and drives her in a roundabout way rather than directly to her destination. The meter reads $12 but she has only $5, angering Ed.

Mary is trying to find a man she impulsively married in Dublin but hasn't seen since, Jim, a writer. He is nowhere to be found. His publisher, Miss Millard, reveals that Jim has gone back to Europe to write and that Mary should go back as well.

The distraught Mary spends a dollar on a St. Anthony statue and prays for help. Ed loses it. When he drives her back to the ship, he discovers Mary has left an infant son there, which is why she desperately seeks Jim.

Ed takes her home. On television, the statue has been located outside St. Patrick's cathedral and Jim is among those interviewed about it. It's a miracle and Mary hurries there in Ed's taxi, only to learn that Jim was previously wed to Miss Millard, who wants him back. She has nowhere else to turn, but Ed finds love in his heart.

== Cast ==
- Dan Dailey as Ed
- Constance Smith as Mary
- Mark Roberts as Jim
- Neva Patterson as Miss Millard
- DeForest Kelley as Fred (uncredited)
- Stubby Kaye as Morris (uncredited)
