= Walter Lang =

American film director (1896–1972)

- Born: August 10, 1896; Memphis, Tennessee, US
- Died: February 7, 1972 (aged 75); Palm Springs, California, US
- Resting place: Inglewood Park Cemetery
- Occupation: Film director
- Years active: 1925–1961
- Spouse: Madalynne Field (m. 1937–1972; his death)

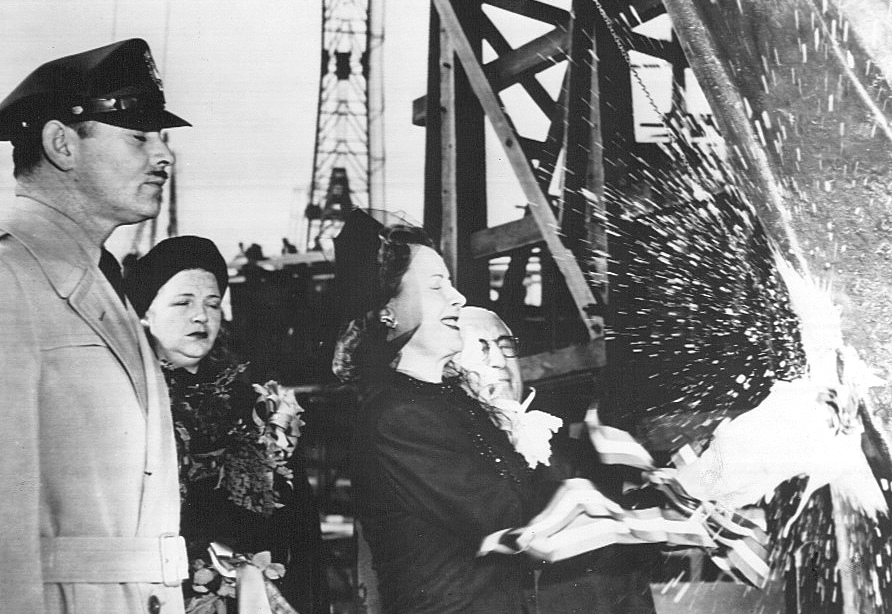
At christening of the ship S. S. Carole Lombard (1944). Lang's wife Madalynne Field, a former actress, is second from left. Also in photo (L-R) are Clark Gable, actress Irene Dunne, and Louis B. Mayer.

Walter Richard Lang (August 10, 1896 – February 7, 1972) was an American film director.

== Early life ==
Walter Lang was born in Memphis, Tennessee. As a young man he went to New York City where he found clerical work at a film production company. The business piqued his artistic instincts and he began learning the various facets of filmmaking and eventually worked as an assistant director. However, Lang also had ambitions to be a painter and left the United States for a time to join the great gathering of artists and writers in the Montparnasse Quarter of Paris, France. Things did not work out as Lang hoped and he eventually returned home and to the film business.

== Career ==
In 1925, Walter Lang directed his first silent film, The Red Kimono. In the mid-1930s, he was hired by 20th Century Fox where, as a director, he "painted" a number of the spectacular colorful musicals for which Fox Studios became famous for producing during the 1940s. One of Lang's most recognized films is the lavish adaptation of Rodgers and Hammerstein's musical The King and I (1956) for which he was nominated for the Academy Award for Best Director and his star, Yul Brynner, won the Academy Award for Best Actor. Another is State Fair, also a Rodgers and Hammerstein classic, which was shown to servicemen around the world in the last months of World War II.

For his contribution to the motion picture industry, Walter Lang has a star on the Hollywood Walk of Fame at 6520 Hollywood Blvd.

== Personal life ==
Lang was married to Madalynne Field (1907–1974) from 1937 until his death. Field, a former actress, had met and befriended Carole Lombard when they were employed as Sennett Bathing Beauties in the late 1920s. Field's film career ended with the demise of Sennett's studio. However, she maintained her friendship with Lombard, and acted as Lombard's secretary until her marriage. She met Lang when he directed Lombard in Love Before Breakfast (1936). Lang was buried in the Inglewood Park Cemetery, in Inglewood, California.

== Filmography ==
- The Red Kimono (1925)
- The Earth Woman (1926)
- The Golden Web (1926)
- Money to Burn (1926)
- The Ladybird (1927)
- The Satin Woman (1927)
- Sally in Our Alley (1927)
- By Whose Hand? (1927)
- The College Hero (1927)
- The Night Flyer (1928)
- Alice Through a Looking Glass (1928)
- The Desert Bride (1928)
- The Spirit of Youth (1929)
- Hello Sister (1930)
- Cock o' the Walk (1930)
- The Big Fight (1930)
- The Costello Case (1930)
- Brothers (1930)
- Command Performance (1931)
- Hell Bound (1931)
- Women Go on Forever (1931)
- No More Orchids (1932)
- The Warrior's Husband (1933)
- Meet the Baron (1933)
- Whom the Gods Destroy (1934)
- The Party's Over (1934)
- The Mighty Barnum (1934)
- Carnival (1935)
- Hooray for Love (1935)
- Love Before Breakfast (1936)
- Top of the Town (1937)
- Wife, Doctor and Nurse (1937)
- Second Honeymoon (1937)
- The Baroness and the Butler (1938)
- I'll Give a Million (1938)
- The Little Princess (1939)
- Susannah of the Mounties (1939)
- The Blue Bird (1940)
- Star Dust (1940)
- The Great Profile (1940)
- Tin Pan Alley (1940)
- Moon over Miami (1941)
- Week-End in Havana (1941)
- Song of the Islands (1942)
- The Magnificent Dope (1942)
- Coney Island (1943)
- Greenwich Village (1944)
- State Fair (1945)
- Claudia and David (1946)
- Sentimental Journey (1946)
- Mother Wore Tights (1947)
- Sitting Pretty (1948)
- When My Baby Smiles at Me (1948)
- You're My Everything (1949)
- Cheaper by the Dozen (1950)
- The Jackpot (1950)
- On the Riviera (1951)
- With a Song in My Heart (1952)
- Call Me Madam (1953)
- There's No Business Like Show Business (1954)
- The King and I (1956)
- Desk Set (1957)
- But Not for Me (1959)
- Can-Can (1960)
- The Marriage-Go-Round (1961)
- Snow White and the Three Stooges (1961)

Directed Academy Award performances
Under Lang's direction, these actors have received Academy Award nominations (and one win) for their performances in their respective roles.

Year	Performer	Film	Result
Academy Award for Best Actor
1948	Clifton Webb	Sitting Pretty	Nominated
1948	Dan Dailey	When My Baby Smiles at Me	Nominated
1956	Yul Brynner	The King and I	Won
Academy Award for Best Actress
1952	Susan Hayward	With a Song in My Heart	Nominated
1956	Deborah Kerr	The King and I	Nominated
Academy Award for Best Supporting Actress
1952	Thelma Ritter	With a Song in My Heart	Nominated
