= Dan Dailey =

American actor and dancer (1915–1978)

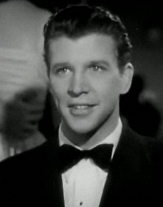
- Dailey in Washington Melodrama (1941)
- Born: Daniel James Dailey Jr. December 14, 1915; New York City, U.S.
- Died: October 16, 1978 (aged 62); Los Angeles, U.S.
- Occupation: Actor, dancer
- Years active: 1921; 1937–1977
- Spouses: Esther Rodier (m. 19??; div. 1941); Elizabeth Hofert (m. 1942; div. 1951); Gwen Carter (m. 1955; div. 1960)
- Children: 1
- Relatives: Irene Dailey (sister)

Daniel James Dailey Jr. (December 14, 1915 – October 16, 1978) was an American actor and dancer. He is best remembered for a series of popular musicals he made at 20th Century Fox such as Mother Wore Tights (1947).

== Biography ==
=== Early life ===
Dailey was born on December 14, 1915, in New York City, to Daniel James Dailey Sr. and Helen Theresa (née Ryan) Dailey. His younger sister was actress Irene Dailey.

=== Theatre ===
He appeared in a minstrel show in 1921 and later appeared in vaudeville. He worked as a golf caddy and shoe salesman before he got his first good break, playing in a show on a South American cruise ship in 1934.

He made his Broadway debut in 1937 in Babes in Arms. He followed it with Stars in Your Eyes and I Married an Angel.

=== MGM ===
In 1940, he was signed by Metro-Goldwyn-Mayer to make films and, although his past career had been in musicals, he was initially cast in the drama Susan and God (1940). He also played a Nazi in The Mortal Storm (1940).

Dailey was the juvenile lead in The Captain Is a Lady (1940) and Dulcy (1940). He appeared in a musical comedy in Hullabaloo (1940), then had a small role in the drama Keeping Company (1941) and was the juvenile in The Wild Man of Borneo (1941). He could be seen in Washington Melodrama (1941) and Ziegfeld Girl (1941), and played a gangster in The Get-Away (1941).

Dailey was third billed in a "B", Down in San Diego (1941) and had a small part in an "A" musical, Lady Be Good (1941).

Dailey was loaned out to 20th Century Fox for Moon Over Her Shoulder (1941), then appeared opposite Donna Reed in Mokey (1942). He was third-billed in Sunday Punch (1942).

Universal borrowed him to support Leo Carrillo in Timber (1942). He stayed at that studio for Give Out, Sisters (1942), a musical with The Andrews Sisters and Donald O'Connor.

Dailey's last film for MGM was Panama Hattie (1942). It was a hit and Dailey's career looked like it was going to the next level when cast in For Me and My Gal. However, Dailey was drafted and Gene Kelly ended up taking the role.

=== Military service ===
An army reserve cavalry officer, Dailey was commissioned from Signal Corps Officer Candidate School at Fort Monmouth, New Jersey. Eventually, he was served with the 88th Infantry Regiment in northern Italy.

=== 20th Century Fox ===
When Dailey returned to Hollywood, MGM did not renew his contract, which led him to sign a contract with 20th Century Fox. Their association began brilliantly with Mother Wore Tights (1947) in which Dailey supported the studio's biggest star, Betty Grable. His part was built up during filming and the movie was Fox's most popular movie of 1947, making $5 million.

Fox promptly cast Dailey opposite their other big female star, Jeanne Crain, in You Were Meant for Me (1948). It was directed by Lloyd Bacon who also directed him in Give My Regards to Broadway (1948).

Dailey was reunited with Grable in When My Baby Smiles at Me (1948). It was Fox's biggest hit of the year and garnered Dailey an Academy Award nomination for Best Actor at the 21st Academy Awards.

Fox tried Dailey in a comedy, Chicken Every Sunday (1949) with Celeste Holm, then he teamed with Anne Baxter in the popular musical You're My Everything (1949).

In 1949, he showcased his singing abilities by recording four songs for Decca Records with the popular Andrews Sisters. Two of the songs were Irish novelties ("Clancy Lowered the Boom!" and "I Had a Hat (When I Came In)"). The other songs, "Take Me Out to the Ball Game" and "In the Good Old Summer Time", capitalized on the success of two MGM blockbuster films of the same names, starring Gene Kelly, Esther Williams, and Frank Sinatra (Take Me Out to the Ball Game); and Judy Garland and Van Johnson (In the Good Old Summertime). Dailey and The Andrews Sisters were an excellent match, and their vocal stylings were full of gaiety and fun.

Dailey starred in a film for John Ford, When Willie Comes Marching Home (1950) which was a mild success at the box office. He received a Golden Globe nomination for Best Actor in a Musical or Comedy in 1951. A third teaming with Grable was in My Blue Heaven (1950). He made a cameo in I'll Get By (1950).

Dailey was reunited with Anne Baxter in A Ticket to Tomahawk (1950), often noted as one of the first screen appearances of Marilyn Monroe, who played a dance hall girl. He made a fourth (and final) film with Grable, Call Me Mister (1951).

Fox tried Dailey in a romantic drama, I Can Get It for You Wholesale (1951), playing opposite Susan Hayward. Then he was in a biopic, The Pride of St. Louis (1951), as the baseball player Dizzy Dean.

Dailey made a second film with Ford, a remake of What Price Glory (1952), where he teamed with James Cagney.

Universal borrowed him for a musical, Meet Me at the Fair (1953). Fox put him in a drama, Taxi (1953), then a musical with June Haver, The Girl Next Door (1953). He did another baseball-themed film, The Kid from Left Field (1953).

In 1954, Dailey signed a new seven-year contract with Fox.

Dailey was scheduled to appear in the 20th Century Fox musical extravaganza There's No Business Like Show Business (1954), which featured Irving Berlin's music and also starred Monroe, Ethel Merman, Mitzi Gaynor, Johnnie Ray, and Donald O'Connor, whose wife Gwen divorced him and married Dailey around that time. Filming was delayed due to director Walter Lang's poor health. Dailey agreed to appear in Susan Slept Here and Heller in Pink Tights. But Susan ended up being made with Dick Powell and Pink Tights was postponed. Eventually There's No Business Like Show Business was made and proved to be Dailey's biggest hit in a long time.

=== Metro-Goldwyn-Mayer ===
Dailey went to Metro-Goldwyn-Mayer to play GI-turned-advertising man Doug Hallerton in It's Always Fair Weather (1955) alongside Gene Kelly. The film was screened at drive-in theaters and was not a box-office success, although it did receive good reviews.

He starred opposite Cyd Charisse and Agnes Moorehead in Meet Me in Las Vegas (1956).

Dailey returned to Fox for one more musical, The Best Things in Life Are Free (1956) to play songwriter Ray Henderson opposite Gordon MacRae.

The following year, he portrayed "Jughead" Carson in the drama The Wings of Eagles (1957) for John Ford, a biographical film on the life of Frank Wead, starring John Wayne.

He was one of several stars in Fox's comedy Oh, Men! Oh, Women! (1957). For the same studio, he was part of the ensemble in The Wayward Bus (1957). Dailey made a war film for MGM, Underwater Warrior (1958).

=== Later career ===
As the musical genre began to wane in the late-1950s, he moved on to various comedic and dramatic roles on television, including starring in The Four Just Men (1959–1960).

He starred with Cantinflas in Pepe (1960), had a cameo in Hemingway's Adventures of a Young Man (1961), and made Four Nights of the Full Moon (1963) in Spain. He returned to Broadway in Catch Me If You Can (1965).

In the late 1960s, Dailey toured as Oscar Madison in a road production of The Odd Couple, co-starring Elliott Reid as Felix Unger and also featuring Peter Boyle as Murray the cop. He did a stint on Broadway in Plaza Suite.

From 1969 to 1971, Dailey played "The Governor" opposite Julie Sommars's "J.J." in the sitcom The Governor & J.J., which revolved around the relationship between his character, the conservative governor of an unnamed state, and his liberal daughter Jennifer Jo. His performance won him the Golden Globe for Best Actor in a Television Musical or Comedy for performances in 1969, the year that this category was introduced.

He starred in a short-lived series Faraday & Company in 1973, and was originally set to play The Waco Kid in Mel Brooks' Blazing Saddles (1974) before withdrawing from the project. (Gene Wilder ended up taking over the part.)

Later film performances included The Private Files of J. Edgar Hoover (1977), as Clyde Tolson.

== Personal life ==
Dailey divorced his first wife in 1941 and remarried a year later to Elizabeth Hofert. They had one son, Dan III, in 1947, and separated in 1949. They divorced in 1951.

Dailey's son died by suicide in 1975.

Dailey broke his hip in 1977 and developed anemia. He died on October 16, 1978, from complications following a hip-replacement surgery. He is buried at Forest Lawn Memorial Park in Glendale, California.

== Filmography ==
Films:

- Susan and God (1940) – Homer (uncredited)
- The Mortal Storm (1940) – Holl
- The Captain Is a Lady (1940) – Perth Nickerson
- Dulcy (1940) – Bill Ward
- Hullabaloo (1940) – Bob Strong
- Keeping Company (1940) – Jim Reynolds
- The Wild Man of Borneo (1941) – Ed LeMotte
- Washington Melodrama (1941) – Whitney King
- Ziegfeld Girl (1941) – Jimmy Walters
- The Getaway (1941) – Sonny Black
- Down in San Diego (1941) – Al Haines
- Lady Be Good (1941) – Bill Pattison
- Moon Over Her Shoulder (1941) – Rex
- Mokey (1942) – Herbert Delano
- Sunday Punch (1942) – Olaf 'Ole' Jensen
- Timber (1942) – Kansas
- Give Out, Sisters (1942) – Bob Edwards
- Panama Hattie (1942) – Dick Bulliard
- This Is the Army (1943) – Soldier – 'This Is the Army' Number (uncredited)
- Mother Wore Tights (1947) – Daddy
- You Were Meant for Me (1948) – Chuck Arnold
- Give My Regards to Broadway (1948) – Bert Norwick
- When My Baby Smiles at Me (1948) – 'Skid' Johnson
- Chicken Every Sunday (1948) – Jim Hefferan
- You're My Everything (1949) – Timothy O'Connor
- When Willie Comes Marching Home (1950) – William 'Bill' Kluggs
- A Ticket to Tomahawk (1950) – Johnny Behind-the-Deuces
- My Blue Heaven (1950) – Jack Moran
- I'll Get By (1950) – Marine dancing with June Haver & Gloria DeHaven (uncredited)
- Call Me Mister (1951) – Shep Dooley
- I Can Get It for You Wholesale (1951) – Teddy Sherman
- The Pride of St. Louis (1952) – Jerome Hanna 'Dizzy' Dean
- What Price Glory? (1952) – 1st Sgt. Quirt
- Taxi (1953) – Ed Nielson
- Meet Me at the Fair (1953) – Doc Tilbee
- The Girl Next Door (1953) – Bill Carter
- The Kid from Left Field (1953) – Larry 'Pop' Cooper
- There's No Business Like Show Business (1954) – Terrance Donahue
- It's Always Fair Weather (1955) – Doug Hallerton
- Meet Me in Las Vegas (1956) – Chuck Rodwell
- The Best Things in Life Are Free (1956) – Ray Henderson
- The Wings of Eagles (1957) – 'Jughead' Carson
- Oh, Men! Oh, Women! (1957) – Arthur Turner
- The Wayward Bus (1957) – Ernest Horton
- Underwater Warrior (1958) – Cmdr. David Forest
- Pepe (1960) – Ted Holt
- Hemingway's Adventures of a Young Man (1962) – Billy Campbell
- Four Nights of the Full Moon (1963)
- The Private Files of J. Edgar Hoover (1977) – Clyde Tolson (final film role)

Radio:

- Philco Radio Time (1948)
- Lux Radio Theatre (1949–1954) (multiple adaptations)

Television:

- The Four Just Men (1959–1960)
- The Untouchables (1962) - Dexter Bayless
- The Alfred Hitchcock Hour (1962) (Season 1 Episode 14: "The Tender Poisoner") - Philip 'Barney' Bartel
- The Governor & J.J. (1969–1970) – Gov. William Drinkwater
- Here's Lucy 1971
- Faraday & Company (1973–1974) – Frank Faraday

Stage:

- Babes in Arms (1937)
- I Married an Angel (1939)
- Stars in Your Eyes (1939)
- Burlesque (1958)
- Take Me Along (1961)
- Guys and Dolls (1961–1965)
- High Button Shoes (1964)
- Catch Me If You Can (1965; 1972)
- The Odd Couple (1966–1968)
- Plaza Suite (1969–1970)

Other:

- Tournament of Roses (narrator) (1954)
- Testimony of Two Men (TV mini-series) (1977)

=== Box office ranking ===
For a number of years, movie exhibitors voted Dailey among the most popular stars in the country:

- 1949 – 19th (United States)
- 1950 – 21st (United States)
