= Mother Wore Tights =

1947 film by Walter Lang

- Theatrical poster
- Directed by: Walter Lang
- Screenplay by: Lamar Trotti
- Based on: Mother Wore Tights; 1944 novel by Miriam Young
- Produced by: Lamar Trotti
- Starring: Betty Grable; Dan Dailey; Mona Freeman
- Narrated by: Anne Baxter
- Cinematography: Harry Jackson
- Edited by: J. Watson Webb Jr.
- Music by: Frank Burt; David Buttolph
- Distributed by: Twentieth Century Fox Film Corporation
- Release date: August 20, 1947
- Running time: 107 minutes
- Country: United States
- Language: English
- Box office: $5,000,000

Mother Wore Tights is a 1947 American Technicolor musical film starring Betty Grable and Dan Dailey as married vaudeville performers, directed by Walter Lang.

This was Grable and Dailey's first film together, based on a book of the same name by Miriam Young. It was the highest-grossing film of Grable's career up to this time, earning more than $5 million at the box office. It was also 20th Century Fox's most successful film of 1947.

Alfred Newman won the Academy Award for Best Music, Scoring of a Musical Picture. Josef Myrow (music) and Mack Gordon (lyrics) were nominated for Original Song ("You Do"), while Harry Jackson was nominated for Color Cinematography.

== Plot ==
In turn-of-the-century Oakland, California, the teenaged Myrtle McKinley (Betty Grable) is expected to follow high school by attending a San Francisco business college. Instead, she takes a job performing with a traveling vaudeville troupe, where she meets and falls in love with singer-dancer Frank Burt (Dan Dailey).

Frank proposes that they marry and also entertain on stage together as an act, which proves very popular. Myrtle retires from show business after giving birth to daughters Iris (Mona Freeman) and Mikie (Connie Marshall), while her husband goes on tour with another partner.

A few years later, less successful now, Frank persuades his wife to return to the stage. The girls are cared for by their grandmother as their parents leave town for months at a time.

Iris and Mikie are school girls when they are given a trip to Boston to see their parents. Iris meets a well-to-do young man, Bob Clarkman (Robert Arthur), and is permitted to attend an exclusive boarding school there. She is embarrassed by her parents' profession, however, and mortified at what the reaction will be from Bob and all of her new school friends when they learn that her parents are performing nearby.

Myrtle and Frank take matters into their own hands, arranging with the school to have all of the students attend a show. To her great relief, Iris is delighted when her classmates adore her parents' sophisticated act. By the time she's out of school and ready to marry, Iris wants to go into show business herself.

== Cast ==
- Betty Grable as Myrtle McKinley Burt
- Dan Dailey as Frank Burt
- Mona Freeman as Iris Burt
- Connie Marshall as Mikie Burt
- Vanessa Brown as Bessie
- Robert Arthur as Bob Clarkman
- Sara Allgood as Grandmother McKinley
- William Frawley as Mr. Schneider
- Ruth Nelson as Miss Ridgeway
- Anabel Shaw as Alice Flemmerhammer
- Michael Dunne as Roy Bivins.
- George Cleveland as Grandfather McKinley
- Veda Ann Borg as Rosemary Olcott
- Sig Ruman as Papa
- Lee Patrick as Lil
- Señor Wences as himself (with his ventriloquist character "Johnny")
- Anne Baxter as Narrator
- Chick Chandler as Ed
- Harry Cheshire as Minister
- Ruth Clifford as Resort Guest
- George Davis as Waiter
- Maude Eburne as Mrs. Muggins
- William Forrest as Mr. Clarkman
- Anne Kimbell as Iris's friend
- Kathleen Lockhart as Mrs. Clarkman
- Mae Marsh as Resort Guest
- Tom Moore as Man
- Frank Orth as Stage Doorman
- Lotte Stein as Mama
- Will Wright as Withers
- Eula Morgan as Opera Singer

== Accolades ==
The film was nominated for the American Film Institute's 2006 list AFI's Greatest Movie Musicals.
