= Wife, Doctor and Nurse =

1937 film

- Directed by: Walter Lang
- Written by: Kathryn Scola; Lamar Trotti
- Produced by: Raymond Griffith; Darryl F. Zanuck
- Starring: Loretta Young; Warner Baxter; Virginia Bruce
- Cinematography: Edward Cronjager
- Edited by: Walter Thompson
- Music by: Arthur Lange
- Production company: 20th Century-Fox
- Distributed by: 20th Century-Fox
- Release date: September 17, 1937
- Running time: 85 minutes
- Country: United States
- Language: English

Wife, Doctor and Nurse is a 1937 American comedy film directed by Walter Lang and starring Loretta Young, Warner Baxter and Virginia Bruce.

== Cast ==
- Loretta Young as Ina Heath Lewis
- Warner Baxter as Dr. Judd Lewis
- Virginia Bruce as Miss Stephens aka Steve
- Jane Darwell as Mrs. Krueger
- Sidney Blackmer as Dr. Therberg
- Maurice Cass as Pompout
- Minna Gombell as Constance
- Margaret Irving as Mrs. Cunningham
- Bill Elliott as Bruce Thomas (as Gordon Elliott)
- Lynn Bari (uncredited)

== Bibliography ==
- Dick, Bernard F. Hollywood Madonna: Loretta Young. University Press of Mississippi, 2011.
