= Whirlpool (1949 film) =

1950 film by Otto Preminger

- Theatrical release poster
- Directed by: Otto Preminger
- Screenplay by: Ben Hecht; Andrew Solt
- Based on: Methinks the Lady... 1946 novel by Guy Endore
- Produced by: Otto Preminger
- Starring: Gene Tierney; Richard Conte; José Ferrer; Charles Bickford; Barbara O'Neil; Eduard Franz; Constance Collier; Fortunio Bonanova
- Cinematography: Arthur C. Miller
- Edited by: Louis R. Loeffler
- Music by: David Raksin
- Color process: Black and white
- Production company: 20th Century Fox
- Distributed by: 20th Century Fox
- Release date: January 13, 1950
- Running time: 97 minutes
- Country: United States
- Language: English
- Budget: $1.3 million

Whirlpool is a 1950 American film noir thriller directed by Otto Preminger and written by Ben Hecht and Andrew Solt, adapted from the 1946 novel Methinks the Lady... by Guy Endore. The film stars Gene Tierney, Richard Conte, José Ferrer and Charles Bickford, and features Constance Collier in her final film role. Its plot follows the kleptomaniac wife of a wealthy Los Angeles psychoanalyst who, after a chance meeting with a hypnotist, is charged with a violent murder.

Owing to anti-British statements screenwriter Hecht had made in the recent past concerning the United Kingdom's involvement in Israel, prints of the film initially circulated in the country replaced his credit with the pseudonym Lester Barstow.

== Plot ==
Ann Sutton, the wife of Dr. William Sutton, a successful psychoanalyst, is caught shoplifting in an upscale Los Angeles department store, and loses consciousness when apprehended. She is saved from scandal by smooth-talking hypnotist David Korvo, who persuades the store officials to put the mermaid pin she stole on her credit account, and not prosecute. Korvo pressures Ann into coming to lunch with him, and she is relieved when, instead of accepting the blackmail payment she thinks he is after, he tears up her check and the store record of her shoplifting, and promises to help her.

Ann, overcome with shame surrounding her secret, begins experiencing insomnia. She attends a sophisticated party with Korvo, where she meets Theresa Randolph, a former lover of Korvo's and one of her husband's (William) patients. Korvo hypnotizes Ann at the party and instructs her to sleep, which works, but she does not respond to other orders. Ann meets Korvo at the hotel where he lives for further therapy sessions, but refuses to go up to his suite and insists on talking in public in the hotel bar. Korvo distracts her and takes the martini glass with her fingerprints on it, as well as her scarf.

Later that night, Ann enters a trance, takes two vinyl records from her husband's patient archives and brings them to Theresa's house, where she hides them in a closet before discovering Theresa's murdered body in the den. Ann's entry into the home sets off a silent alarm, and police arrive moments later. Before regaining full lucidity, Ann confesses to hating Theresa. Her scarf is found in the home, and the martini glass is found in Korvo's apartment. Police charge her with murder, presuming she strangled Theresa out of jealousy over Korvo.

Ann's husband, William, and his lawyer, Martin Avery, believe she is innocent and that Korvo framed her. William recalls that Theresa had informed him during their therapy sessions that Korvo had extorted her for $60,000. It is found, however, that Korvo has a cast-iron alibi: at the time of the murder and ever since, he has been in the hospital weak and prostrate after a gall bladder operation. The police lieutenant in charge of the case, Colton, is sure this rules him out as a suspect.

When William leaves the police station, Avery and Colton persuade Ann to confess her real guilt. Instead, she only confesses to her kleptomania, stemming from her indigent childhood; when William wanted her to ignore her own riches and live on his small salary at the beginning of their marriage, he triggered Ann's childhood trauma, and she returned to her habit of shoplifting. When William hears of this, he surmises that Ann's kleptomania made her an easy target for Korvo to get her to steal Theresa's patient records from him; he also suspects that Korvo used self-hypnosis to make himself temporarily strong enough to leave his hospital bed and go strangle Theresa. William's theory accounts for Korvo's apparent spike in body temperature observed by the medical personnel on the day of Theresa's murder. William presents his theory to Colton and suggests they bring Ann to Theresa's home to find the records, but Colton dismisses him.

In the hospital, a nurse casually comments to Korvo about the search for Theresa's patient records. Korvo hypnotizes himself again, sneaks out of the hospital, and drives to Theresa's house, where he retrieves the records and starts playing them: they reveal Theresa's voice implicating Korvo in her extortion. Simultaneously, after some contemplation, Colton comes to believe William's theory may be true, and he accompanies him and Ann to Theresa's house. Once there, Korvo menaces Ann with a gun, attempting to force William and Colton out of the room. As his trance begins to wear off, Korvo realizes he is bleeding to death from his surgical wound. In a moment of bravado, he tries to flee the house, but collapses and dies. Colton releases Ann into the care of her husband, and they happily embrace.

== Cast ==
- Gene Tierney as Ann Sutton
- Richard Conte as Dr. William "Bill' Sutton
- José Ferrer as David Korvo (as Jose Ferrer)
- Charles Bickford as Lt. James Colton
- Barbara O'Neil as Theresa Randolph
- Eduard Franz as Martin Avery
- Constance Collier as Tina Cosgrove
- Fortunio Bonanova as Feruccio di Ravallo

== Release ==
Whirlpool was released theatrically in the United States on January 13, 1950.

=== Critical response ===
The staff at Variety liked the film and wrote, "Whirlpool is a highly entertaining, exciting melodrama that combines the authentic features of hypnosis. Ben Hecht and Andrew Solt have tightly woven a screenplay [from a novel by Guy Endore] about the effects of hypnosis on the subconscious, but they, and Otto Preminger in his direction, have eliminated the phoney characteristics that might easily have allowed the picture to slither into becoming just another eerie melodrama."

While The New York Times' film critic Bosley Crowther gave the film a mixed review, he still appreciated the acting, and wrote, "Yet, as we say, this flapdoodle, written by Ben Hecht and Andrew Solt from a novel by Guy Endore, has been handsomely produced and played by a cast which is distinguished by José Ferrer in its midst. Mr. Ferrer, the Broadway champion, is the smooth and piercing villain of the piece who mouths Mr. Hecht's silken phrases with acid savor and burns folks with his eyes. Furthermore, haughty Gene Tierney plays the lady who is slightly off the track and Charles Bickford and Richard Conte are the detective and the husband, respectively. All together, along with several others, they labor to cast a spell. But their efforts are bleakly artificial. You'd better see this one in a state of trance."

Much later, the UK's Channel 4 also gave the film a mixed review, but lauded the screenplay and direction. They wrote, "All this is fairly ridiculous and the plot is full of implausible twists, not to mention daft theories. Luckily, Tierney carries the role of the innocent beauty with ease and has a particularly good line in gliding around blank-faced as if under hypnosis – and in showing her character's subsequent distraught confusion. Conte is stiff and wooden – but no more so than his formal man-of-science role requires, while Ferrer is a compelling cartoon villain. Hecht's dialogue is as snappy as ever, and Preminger cranks up the tension with consummate skill, building towards a dramatic and satisfying conclusion."

=== Home media ===
Whirlpool was released on DVD by 20th Century Fox as part of their "Film Noir" collection in 2005. In October 2019, Twilight Time released a Blu-ray edition of the film limited to 3,000 units.

== See also ==
- List of American films of 1950
- Mental illness in film
