= Cobina Wright Jr. =

American singer, actress and model

- Born: August 14, 1921; New York City, New York, U.S.
- Died: September 1, 2011 (aged 90); Solvang, California, U.S.
- Occupation: Actress
- Mother: Cobina Wright Sr.

Cobina Wright Jr. (August 14, 1921 - September 1, 2011) was an American actress and model. She was featured on the cover of Life magazine's February 17, 1941, issue, and a nationally distributed newspaper columnist described her as a debutante who "fought a draw with Brenda Frazier for the glamour girl championship of New York society."

== Early years ==
Born in New York City, Wright was the daughter of stockbroker William May Wright and singer, actress, and newspaper columnist Cobina Wright Sr. The mother, born Elaine Cobb, created the unusual first name as a variation on her maiden name. Wright grew up in an environment with servants, a yacht, and more on a Long Island estate—all of which was wiped out by the Great Depression.

The mother's plans for the daughter's future led to the parents' divorce, with the father describing as "prostitution" the mother's "grooming [of Cobina Jr.] for a film career capped by a spectacular marriage."

Wright was selected as Miss Manhattan in competition at the 1939 New York World's Fair, and in 1941, Life magazine described her as "a young New Yorker of excellent family but limited means ..."

== Career ==
Although Wright's mother pushed her toward a career in entertainment, achieving success proved to be a challenge. In 1941, newspaper columnist Adela Rogers St. Johns wrote: "I believe that Cobina Wright Jr. had a tougher time getting where she is than almost any other girl in Hollywood. I believe that she faced tougher times and more obstacles and had less help than most girls ... everyone assumed that she had no talent." That situation changed, however, after Wright began performing in vaudeville. By the time she began making films for 20th Century Fox, people were calling her "the good luck girl".

Early in her career, Wright was a singer, initially performing in hotels because her mother would not let her sing in nightclubs. She appeared on Broadway in Lorelei (1938).

By 1938, Wright had signed a film contract with 20th Century Fox. Her films included Small Town Deb (1941), Murder Among Friends (1941), Moon Over Miami (1941), Accent on Love (1941), Charlie Chan in Rio (1941), Week-End in Havana (1941), Right to the Heart (1942), Footlight Serenade (1942), and Something to Shout About (1943).

== Caricature on radio ==
The second season of The Pepsodent Show, an NBC radio program that starred Bob Hope, introduced two female characters, Brenda and Cobina. Richard Zoglin, in his book Hope: Entertainer of the Century, described the pair as "two shrill-voiced, man-hungry society girls ... the first incarnation of a favorite Hope comedy foil: the homely, sex-starved spinster, obsessed with landing a man." The characters were parodies of Wright Jr. and her friend, debutante Brenda Frazier. Wright Sr. took offense and sued, resulting in the dropping of the characters from the program. Lawrence J. Quirk, in his book Bob Hope: The Road Well Traveled, commented, "The irony in this was that Hope had only chosen the names of Frazier and Wright because in reality they were cultured beauties—the exact opposites of the Brenda and Cobina on the show. In a way, it was a reverse compliment ..." Afterward, Wright Jr. became "a regular guest" on the program.

== Personal life ==
In 1938, Wright was romantically linked with Prince Philip of Greece, who later married Elizabeth II of the United Kingdom. The two met in Venice in the year they both turned 17 and enjoyed activities together there for three weeks, after which they spent a week in England "dining, dancing, and walking London's streets, hand in hand."

In November 1941, Wright married Palmer Beaudette, who came from "a wealthy automobile family" in Michigan. Two years later, she left show business to devote her time to raising a family. Beaudette died in 1968. By that time, Wright had become an alcoholic—a condition that was aggravated when she found that "she was left all but penniless" because Beaudette's part of his father's estate reverted to his family after his death. Over time, she dealt successfully with her alcoholism and did volunteer work to help others who were recovering from it. Her efforts included serving on the National Council on Alcoholism and Drug Dependence.

== Death ==
Wright died on September 1, 2011 at age 90.
