= Monica Bannister =

American actress

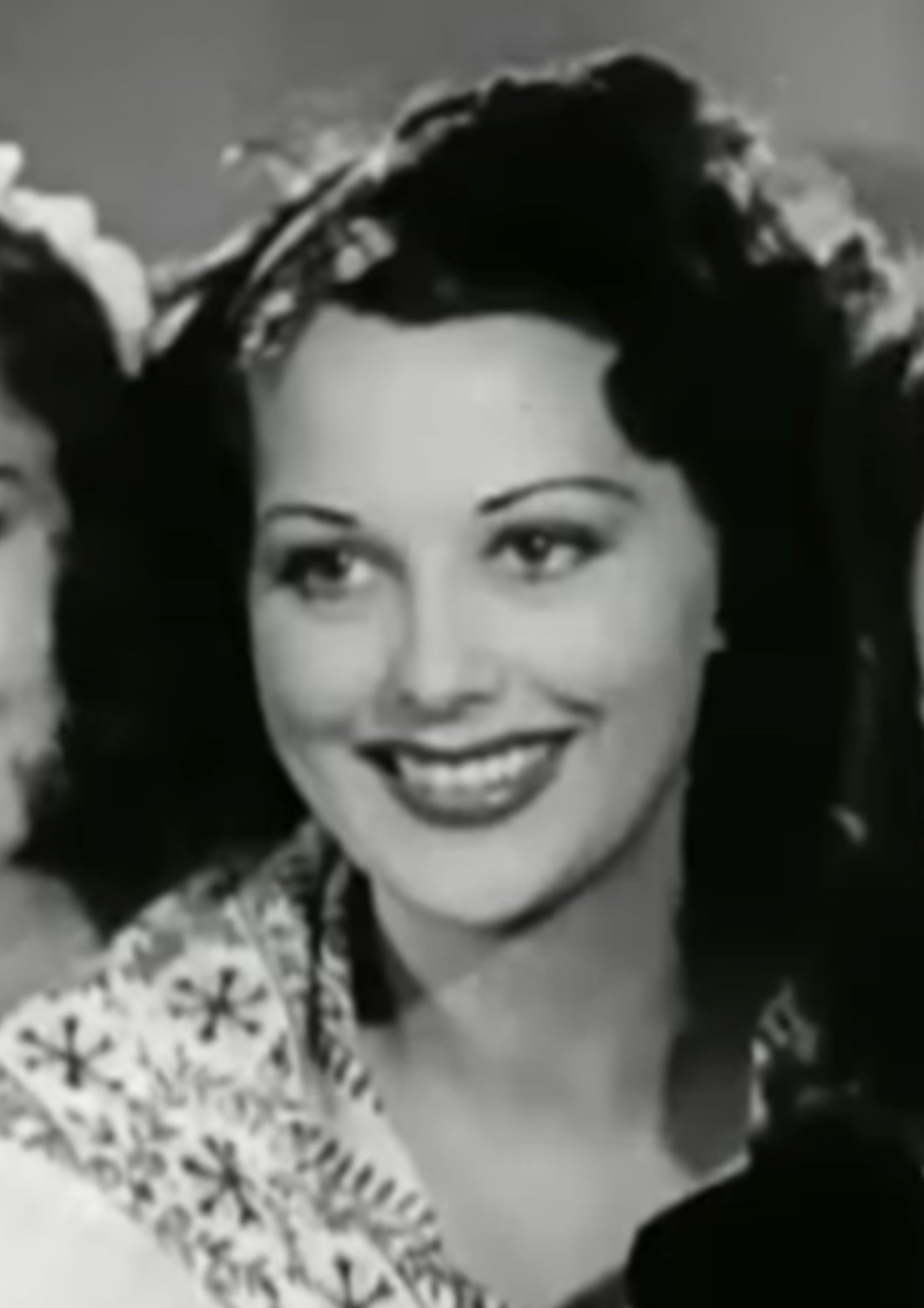
- Bannister in The Flying Deuces (1939)
- Born: Monica Joyce Bannister; September 8, 1910; Forward, Saskatchewan, Canada
- Died: June 17, 2002 (aged 91); San Diego, California, U.S.
- Other names: Monica Wilbanks, Monica Cherkhose, Monica Van Munster
- Occupation: Actress
- Notable work: Mystery of the Wax Museum (1933), The Cowboy and the Blonde (1941)

Monica Bannister (September 8, 1910 – June 17, 2002) was a Canadian-born American actress, best known for her role in Mystery of the Wax Museum (1933).

== Early life and education ==
Bannister was born in Forward, Saskatchewan, and raised in the Pacific Northwest, the daughter of Harry Frederick Bannister and Josephine Mathilda Hagen Bannister. Her father was a candy maker. She graduated from Tillamook High School in Oregon, in 1928.

== Career ==
Bannister was an actress, signed to a contract at the Warner First National studio in 1932. She played "Joan Gale" in Michael Curtiz's Mystery of the Wax Museum (1933), and "Maybelle" and The Cowboy and the Blonde (1941). She also made many smaller appearances in films of the 1930s and 1940s, including Hypnotized (1932), Jimmy the Gent (1934), The Great Ziegfeld (1936), Broadway Melody of 1938 (1937), Flowing Gold (1940), Accent on Love (1941), and Quiet Please, Murder (1942).

In addition to her film work, Bannister was considered a stylish beauty, and was often photographed in swimsuits or gowns. She worked as a showgirl in the Hollywood Restaurant and Cabaret, a popular New York supper club in the 1930s. In 1932, Bannister was named Queen of the Los Angeles Dahlia Show, and photographs of her wearing a dress made entirely from dahlias appeared in newspapers. Her beauty hints were also featured in newspapers in the 1930s. She was said to enjoy boxing for fitness.

== Personal life ==
Bannister married several times. Her first husband was Eugene Willbanks; they divorced in 1935. She married again in 1937, to actor and writer Eddie Cherkose. They divorced in 1939, reconciled, and divorced again in 1940. Her third husband was Max Nolan Lanier; they divorced in the 1940s. In 1952 she married machinist Johan Hendrik Van Munster. He died in 2001, and she died in 2002, in San Diego, California, at the age of 91. "She was a Zigfield girl, and worked on the first space shuttle," said her obituary.
