= Captain Tugboat Annie =

1945 film by Phil Rosen

- Poster of Captain Tugboat Annie
- Directed by: Phil Rosen
- Written by: George Callahan (screenplay); Norman Reilly Raine (story)
- Produced by: James S. Burkett
- Starring: Jane Darwell; Edgar Kennedy
- Cinematography: Harry Neumann
- Edited by: Martin G. Cohn
- Music by: Edward J. Kay
- Distributed by: Republic Pictures
- Release date: November 17, 1945
- Running time: 70 min.
- Country: United States
- Language: English

Captain Tugboat Annie is a 1945 second sequel to the classic Tugboat Annie (1933), this time starring Jane Darwell as Annie and Edgar Kennedy as Horatio Bullwinkle. The film was directed by Phil Rosen, and is also known as Tugboat Annie's Son.

The original film starred Marie Dressler, Wallace Beery, Robert Young, and Maureen O'Sullivan. The first sequel, called Tugboat Annie Sails Again, was released in 1940 starring Marjorie Rambeau as Annie, Alan Hale, Sr. as Horatio Bullwinkle, Jane Wyman, and Ronald Reagan. There is also a 1957 Canadian-filmed television series, The Adventures of Tugboat Annie, starring Minerva Urecal.

== Plot ==
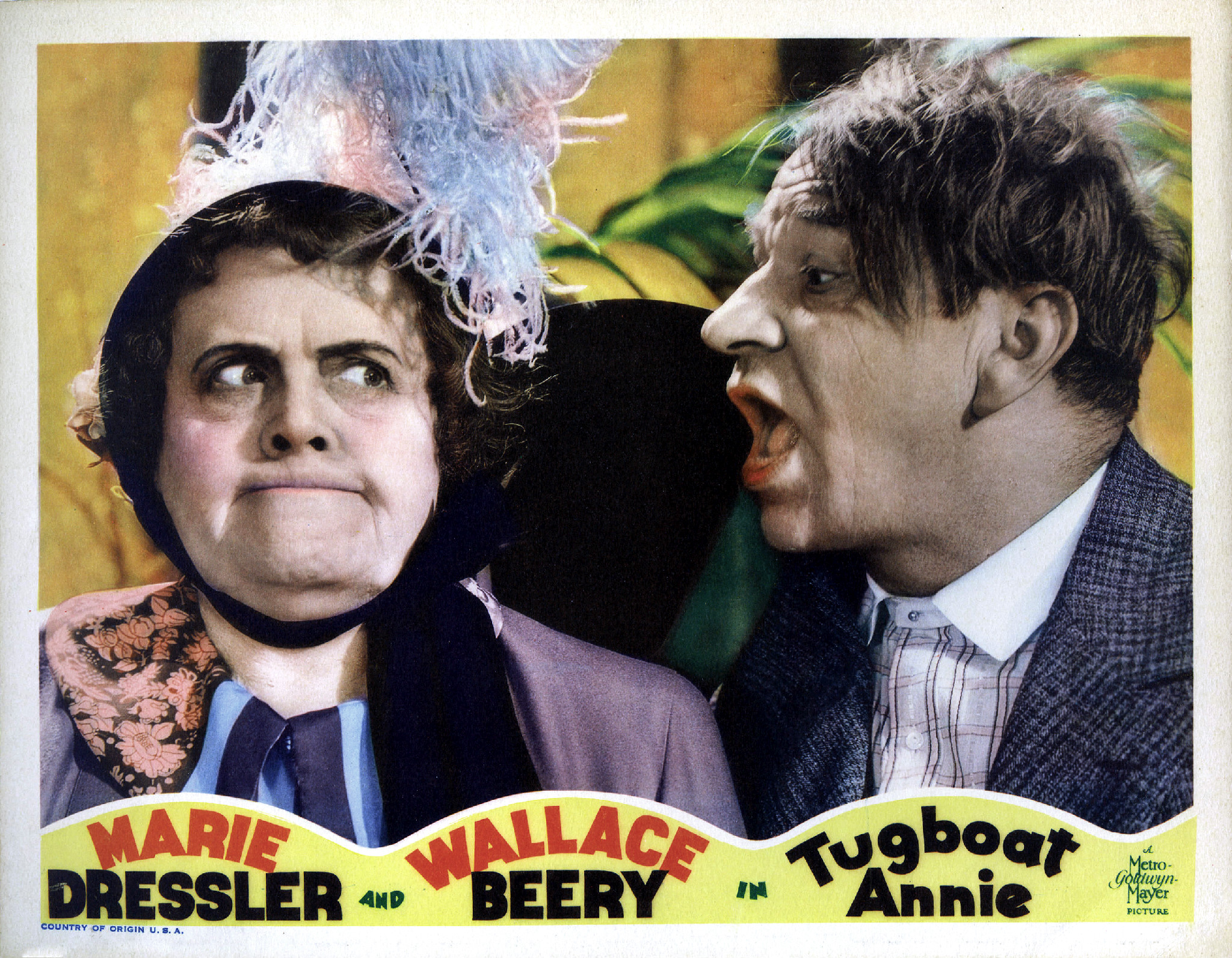
Lobby card from original 1933 Tugboat Annie with Marie Dressler and Wallace Beery.

Right after the war has ended, tugboats are allowed to freely operate again in the US coastal waters. The owner of Secoma Towing & Salvage, Alec Severn (Joseph Crehan), starts searching for the famous Tugboat Annie Brennan (Jane Darwell), to incorporate her back as the captain of his fleet of tugboats.

Severn is unaware that captain Bullwinkle (Edgar Kennedy), Annie's long time rival, has his own agenda and wants to take Annie's place as captain of the fleet. Bullwinkle intentionally gives Severn the wrong address to Annie, in an attempt to put her in bad standing when she doesn't respond to Severn’s letter and request.

Somehow, Annie still gets in touch with Severn and is appointed captain. She starts hiring his crew, an experienced lot of sailors: Pinto (Mantan Moreland), Shiftless (Jack Norton), Missouri Jones (Barton Yarborough) and Johnny Webb (Hardie Albright). Work commences and Annie runs across an orphan named Susan Henley (Saundra Berkova). She is a violin virtuose, and since Annie has worked with her father before the war, and very much would like a child of her own, she wants to adopt Susan as her own. Severn disagrees and claims the child would be better off on shore with his own family. Instead Annie gets to adopt a juvenile delinquent boy, with the help of a judge. It turns out the boy, whose name is Terry Jordan (Charles Gordon), is quite hostile towards Annie, and both she and her crew have difficulties in putting up with his antics.

Susan gets to play for a famous conductor, a womanizing musician, Alfred Puccini (Fritz Feld) whom Annie knew a long time ago, under a different name. Meanwhile, Annie still struggles in winning the heart of Terry, who resists all her friendly attempts.

When Annie gets a very important and acute mission, Bullwinkle secretly empties her fuel tanks and sabotages her radio communication so that he can steal the job. Terry gets the blame for the sabotage, and gets into a fight with one of the crew members because of this. When Terry discovers sees that the man he's fighting is a wounded veteran, he lets the man win. After this, he is respected by the whole crew as a decent boy. Terry finds out that Bullwinkle was the one who sabotaged the tugboat, and forces him to admit this to Annie.

Terry then leaves the ship, leaving a note of explanation for his behaviour and departure. He says he will be back one day. Annie starts focusing more on Susan's upcoming violin concert. The debut is a success, despite the fact that Susan is only eleven years old.

A fire rages the tugboat when Annie returns from the concert, and Terry is back with the crew to help put it out. Even Bullwinkle helps out. When the tugboat tows an oil tanker that has caught fire, and the boat is at risk because of the huge flames, Johnny dies saving Terry’s life. The hardship makes Annie want to quit as captain, but Severn and Terry persuades her to stay on. Susan gets a contract with the San Francisco Symphony Orchestra and Annie makes up with Bullwinkle again.

== Cast ==
- Jane Darwell as Tugboat Annie
- Edgar Kennedy as Captain Bullwinkle
- Charles Gordon as Terry Jordan
- Mantan Moreland as Pinto
- Pamela Blake as Marion Graves
- Hardie Albright as Johnny Webb
- H. B. Warner as Judge Abbott
- Jack Norton as Shiftless
- Barton Yarborough as Missouri Jones
- Fritz Feld as Al Pucci, aka Alfred Puccini
- Sam Flint as Fire Chief
- Anthony Warde as Jake
- Joseph Crehan as Alec Severn (billed as Joe Crehan)
- Pierre Watkin as Dr. Turner
- Saundra Berkova as Susan Henley
