= Tugboat Annie Sails Again =

1940 film

- Directed by: Lewis Seiler
- Written by: Norman Reilly Raine (characters); Walter DeLeon
- Produced by: Edmund Grainger
- Starring: Marjorie Rambeau; Alan Hale Sr. Jane Wyman; Ronald Reagan; Chill Wills
- Cinematography: Arthur Edeson
- Edited by: Harold McLernon
- Music by: Adolph Deutsch
- Distributed by: Warner Bros. Pictures
- Release date: October 18, 1940
- Running time: 77 minutes
- Country: United States
- Language: English

Tugboat Annie Sails Again is a 1940 American comedy romance film directed by Lewis Seiler. The picture is a sequel to Tugboat Annie (1933). Marjorie Rambeau took over the late Marie Dressler's role, and the supporting cast features Alan Hale Sr., Jane Wyman, and Ronald Reagan.

== Plot ==
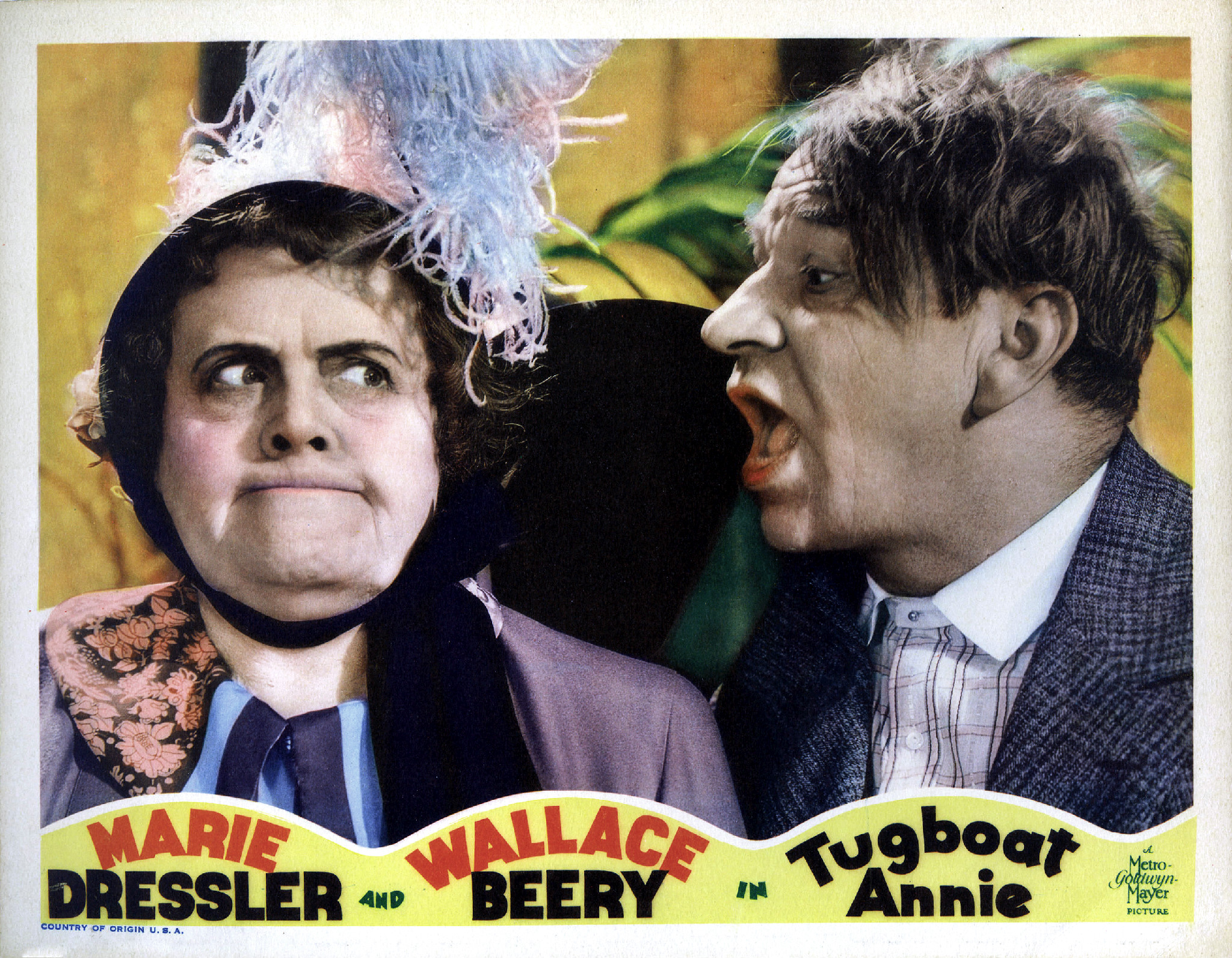
Lobby card from original 1933 Tugboat Annie with Marie Dressler and Wallace Beery.

In this sequel in the series about "Tugboat" Annie Brennan, skipper on the Narcissus, she is still feuding with her arch-rival, Captain Bullwinkle, a Washington State tugman.

Annie's volatile personality makes her come very close to losing her job as captain. The company she works for, Secoma Towing and Salvage Company, gets into real financial trouble when it fails to pay a due invoice of $25,000. Annie has to run the company while the president, Alec Severn, is at the bank trying to fix things.

Annie gets explicit orders to steer clear of the new shipyard owner, millionaire J.B. Armstrong, but she still goes into negotiations with him, trying to get him to sign a profitable contract with the company. The attempt turns into a complete failure, when Annie mistakes the millionaire for another man, treating him harshly and even manages to throw him into a heap of fish. The result is that the shipyard owner cancels the already existing contract with the company altogether.

On top of this, Annie's rival Bullwinkle tricks her into going out to sea to salvage a ship that turns out to be a whale. She manages to save the day after all when she pulls a big ship off a ground, after Bullwinkle has failed to do the same. Annie demands $25,000 as payment for the tugging, and the invoice can be paid after all.

Alec's confidence in Annie is restored and he sends her to negotiate a big job of towing a dry dock all the way to Alaska for the shipyard owner Armstrong. This negotiation too ends in failure, since he doesn't want to give the job to a woman. Shrewdly, Annie goes around this obstacle, by appointing her old friend Mike Mahoney as captain temporarily.

However, it turns out Mahoney has become a helpless drunk, and Annie has to step in to save the situation after all. Still, problems keep surfacing, and Annie finds Armstrong's spoiled daughter, Peggy, on the ship. She has hidden there to accompany her lover Eddie Kent, who is Annie's young ward.

During a storm at sea, Annie is then forced to leave the dock on a beach to save it from breaking and sinking in the waves. She also has to go ashore to hospitalize Mahoney, who has become very sick. When she is ashore, Bullwinkle steals the dock and claims finders keepers on it, according to general salvage rules. When the contract seems to have been breached, Alec fires Annie who was in charge of letting the dock go.

Before retiring entirely, Annie looks into the salvage laws, and finds that a dry dock doesn't count as a ship and the salvage claim therefore doesn't apply to it. She wins the dock back from Bullwinkle, and is reinstated as captain again.

== Cast ==
- Marjorie Rambeau as Capt. Annie Brennan
- Alan Hale, Sr. as Capt. Horatio Bullwinkle
- Jane Wyman as Peggy Armstrong
- Ronald Reagan as Eddie Kent
- Clarence Kolb as Joseph B. 'Joe' Armstrong
- Charles Halton as Alec 'Alex' Severn
- Paul Hurst as Pete
- Victor Kilian as Sam
- Chill Wills as Shiftless
- Harry Shannon as Capt. Mike Mahoney
- John Hamilton as Capt. Broad
- Sidney Bracey as Limey (billed as Sidney Bracy)
- Jack Mower as Johnson
- Margaret Hayes as Rosie (Severn's secretary; billed as Dana Dale)
- Josephine Whittell as Miss Margaret Morgan (Armstrong's secretary)

== Sequels ==
Another sequel appeared five years later called Captain Tugboat Annie with Jane Darwell taking over the title role.

In 1957 a Canadian-filmed television series appeared called, The Adventures of Tugboat Annie, starring Minerva Urecal as Tugboat Annie.
