= Edward Cooper (actor) =

English actor (1883–1956)

- Born: 28 June 1883; Bolton, Lancashire, England, UK
- Died: 15 July 1956 (aged 73); Surrey, England, UK
- Occupation(s): Film and stage actor

Edward Cooper (28 June 1883 – 15 July 1956) was an English actor who worked extensively in both Britain and Hollywood. Cooper generally played minor or supporting parts, but was occasionally given larger roles. He was married for 39 years to actress Ethel Griffies.

== Partial filmography ==
- The Cost of a Kiss (1917)
- Go and Get It (1920)
- Shadows of Conscience (1921)
- Gay and Devilish (1922)
- The Hands of Nara (1922)
- Tillie (1922)
- The Son of the Wolf (1922)
- Paradise (1926)
- Escapade (1932)
- Timbuctoo (1933)
- Clive of India (1935)
- The Imperfect Lady (1935)
- Head Over Heels (1937)
- On the Avenue (1937)
- Rose of Washington Square (1939)
- The Life and Death of Colonel Blimp (1943)

== Bibliography ==
- Low, Rachael (ed.) The History of British Film (Volume 1): The History of the British Film 1896-1906; ISBN 978-0-415-67983-1 (2004; reprinted 6 July 2011).
