= The Adventures of Tugboat Annie =

- Starring: Minerva Urecal; Walter Sande
- Countries of origin: Canada; United States
- No. of episodes: 39

Production
- Executive producer: Anthony Veiller
- Producer: Leon Fromkess
- Running time: 30 minutes
- Production company: Normandie Productions

Original release
- Network: Syndication
- Release: 1957 – 1958

The Adventures of Tugboat Annie is a 1957 Canadian-filmed comedy television series starring Minerva Urecal as Annie Brennan, the widowed captain of the tugboat "Narcissus", and Walter Sande as Horatio J. Bullwinkle, the captain of the "Salamander". The syndicated series lasted for 39 episodes.

== Background ==
Norman Reilly Raine's stories of the salty tugboat captain Annie Brennan, a character based on the life of Thea Foss, first appeared in prose form in the weekly US journal Saturday Evening Post in the late 1920s. She was soon developed into a film character, depicted in three films and portrayed by a different actress in each (Marie Dressler in Tugboat Annie, 1933; Marjorie Rambeau in Tugboat Annie Sails Again, 1940; and Jane Darwell in Captain Tugboat Annie, 1945).

== Development ==
In 1954, a television series was commissioned by the independent American production company Television Programs of America (TPA). The pilot took two years to complete, at a then-record cost of $129,000. Elsa Lanchester, Jay C. Flippen, and Chill Wills were all in line for major roles at one point or another at this early stage. The series was filmed in Toronto harbor and was first shown in Canada, having attracted ratings good enough to interest American television stations. What had succeeded in Canada proved a disappointment in the United States, where the viewing audiences had presumably become accustomed to greater sophistication than the simplistic humor of this series. The show was also screened in the United Kingdom, but is now largely forgotten. TPA announced arrangements for Canadian production of the series on May 12, 1957. Normandie Productions, Ltd. (partially owned by TPA) and Lever Brothers of Canada were co-producers. TPA distributed the series, and Lever Brothers sponsored it in Canada.

== Plot ==
Annie Brennan, widowed and the former skipper of a garbage scow, now captains a ship owned by the Severn Tugboat Company. A sympathetic, 50-year-old woman, her adventures consist of the humorous situations that develop when she attempts to assist people in trouble. Horatio Bullwinkle, a rival tugboat captain refers to her as "The Old Petticoat". The two of them traded insults and stole jobs from each other throughout the run of the series.

== Cast ==
- Minerva Urecal as Annie Brennan
- Walter Sande as Horatio J. Bullwinkle
- Eric Clavering as Shiftless, Annie's deckhand
- Don Orlando as Pinto, Annie's cook
