= Man at Large =

1941 film by Eugene Forde

- Theatrical release poster
- Directed by: Eugene Forde
- Screenplay by: John Larkin
- Produced by: Ralph Dietrich
- Starring: Marjorie Weaver; George Reeves; Richard Derr; Steven Geray; Milton Parsons; Spencer Charters
- Cinematography: Virgil Miller
- Edited by: John Brady
- Music by: David Buttolph
- Production company: 20th Century Fox
- Distributed by: 20th Century Fox
- Release date: September 26, 1941
- Running time: 70 minutes
- Country: United States
- Language: English

Man at Large is a 1941 American mystery thriller film directed by Eugene Forde and written by John Larkin. The film stars Marjorie Weaver, George Reeves, Richard Derr, Steven Geray, Milton Parsons and Spencer Charters. The film was released on September 26, 1941, by 20th Century Fox.

== Synopsis ==
During World War II, before America's entry into the conflict, a German ace pilot Max von Rohn escapes from captivity in Canada. Crossing the border he tries to make contact with a Nazi spy ring operation in the United States. Ranged against him are an FBI Agent, a member of the British Intelligence services and an inquisitive and headstrong young female reporter Dallas Dayle.

== Cast ==
- Marjorie Weaver as Dallas Davis
- George Reeves as Bob Grayson
- Richard Derr as Max
- Steven Geray as Karl Botany
- Milton Parsons as Mr. Sartoris
- Spencer Charters as Mr. Gallon
- Lucien Littlefield as Jones
- Elisha Cook, Jr. as Hotel Clerk
- Minerva Urecal as Mrs. Jones
- Bodil Rosing as Klara
- Richard Lane as Editor Grundy
- Barbara Pepper as Myrtle
- William Edmunds as Otto Kisling
- George Cleveland as Sheriff Pickering
- Kurt Katch as Hans Brinker
- Lenita Lane as Cataloni's Nurse-Receptionist
- Ethel Griffies as Mrs. Zagra
