= Minerva Urecal =

American vaudevillian and actress (1894–1966)

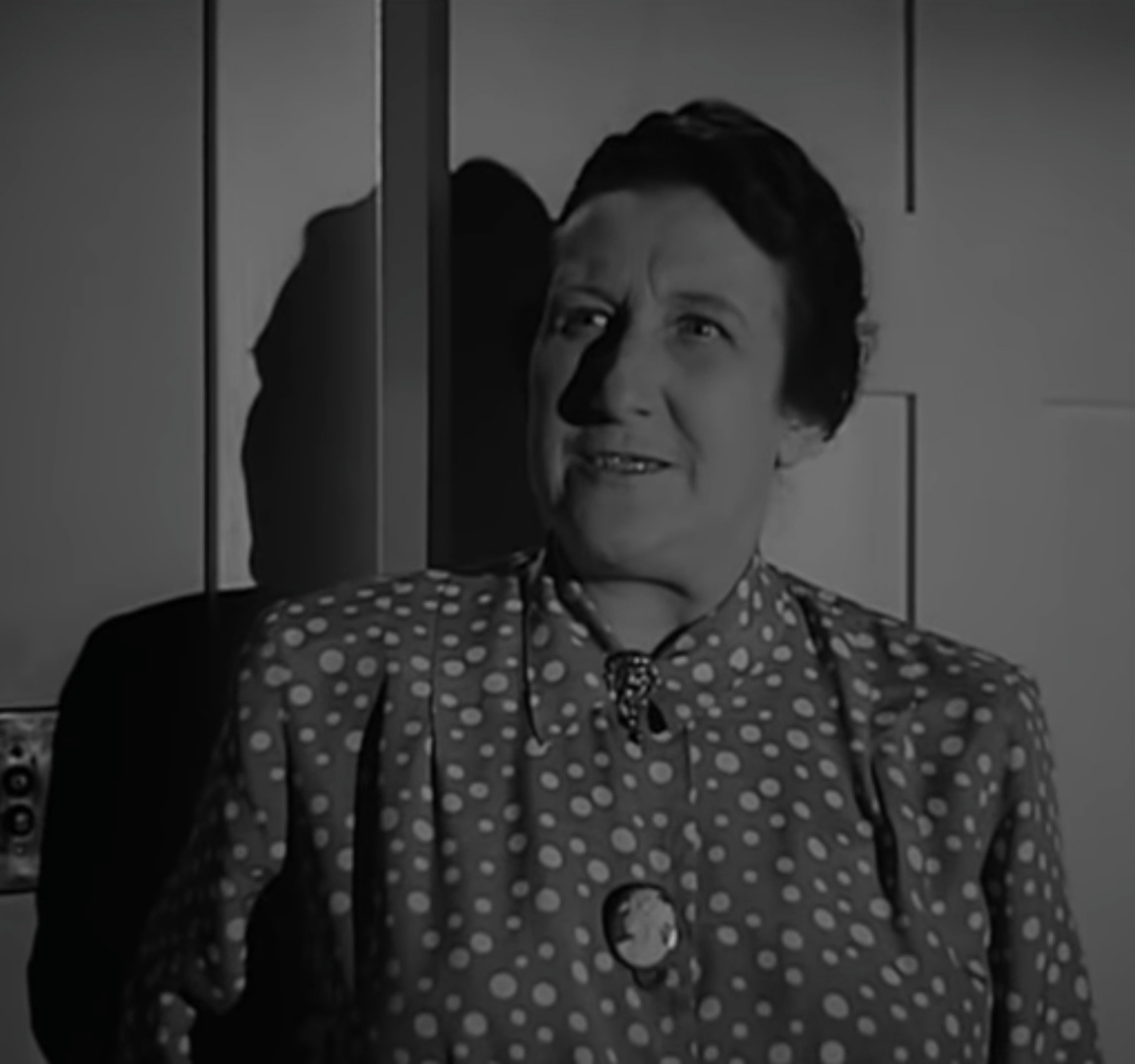
- Urecal in Quicksand (1950)
- Born: Florence Minerva Dunnuck; September 22, 1894; Eureka, California, U.S.
- Died: February 26, 1966 (aged 71); Glendale, California, U.S.
- Resting place: Hollywood Forever Cemetery
- Occupations: Actress; vaudevillian
- Years active: 1933–1966
- Spouse: Max Holtzer

Minerva Urecal (born Florence Minerva Dunnuck; September 22, 1894 – February 26, 1966) was an American stage and radio performer as well as a character actress in Hollywood films and on various television series from the early 1950s to 1965.

== Early years ==
Urecal was born Florence Minerva Dunnuck in Eureka, California in 1894. She later formed her stage name by combining letters from the names of her hometown and state.

== Career ==
Urecal was originally a vaudeville performer before venturing into radio and stage, later making her film debut in 1933. She played largely uncredited roles such as secretaries, laundresses and frontierswomen. She began working in television in the 1950s, favoring Westerns.

From 1932 to 1937, Urecal portrayed Mrs. Pasquale on the Sunday Night Hi-Jinks radio program. On television, she played Maw Bowie, the mother of the title character, in The Adventures of Jim Bowie (1956-1958). She guest-starred on CBS's My Friend Flicka, The Roy Rogers Show, The Lone Ranger, and the syndicated The Range Rider. She also had a recurring role in the 1953-1954 situation comedy Meet Mr. McNutley in the role of Josephine Bradley, the dean of a women's college. The program was broadcast on CBS radio and CBS-TV. She also played Billie the Barber in the 1950 episode of The Lone Ranger as "Billie the Great".

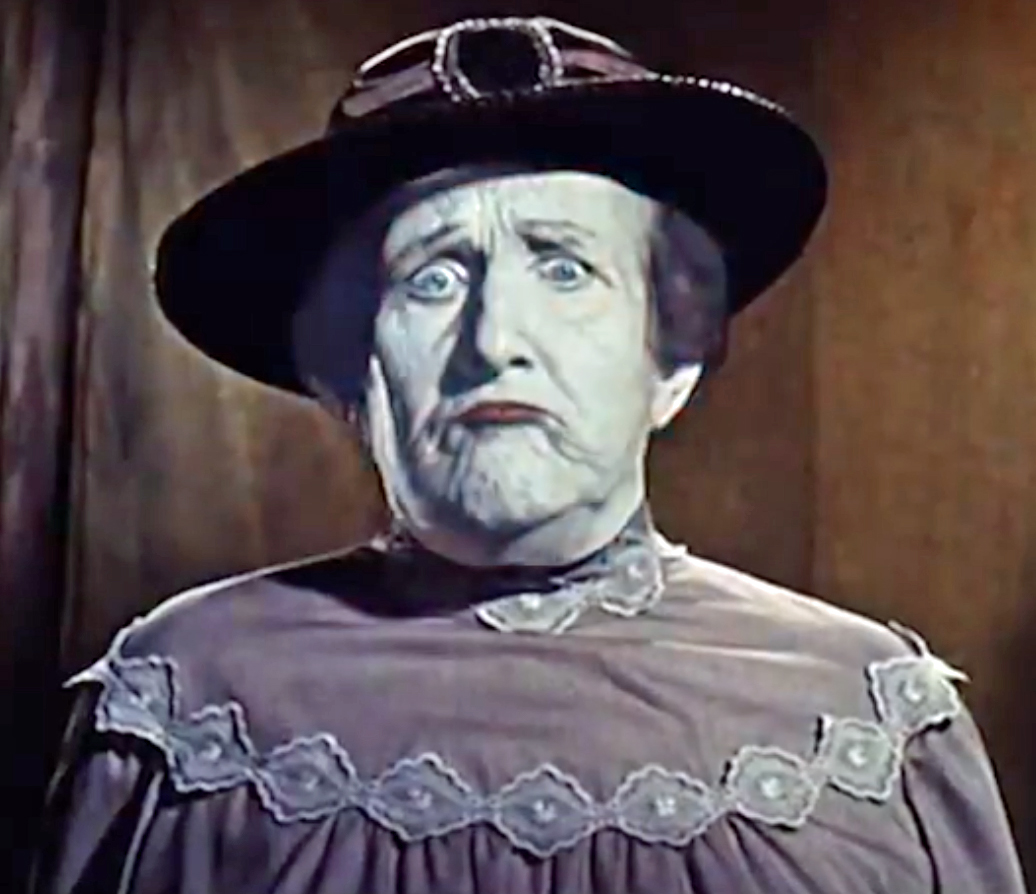
Trailer for 7 Faces of Dr. Lao (1964)

In 1957, Urecal had her only starring television role on the syndicated The Adventures of Tugboat Annie, playing the title character originally performed by Marie Dressler in the film Tugboat Annie in 1933 and continued by Marjorie Rambeau and Jane Darwell in two movie sequels. Later, in 1957, Urecal appeared as a landlady in the Perry Mason episode "The Case of the Fan Dancer's Horse". In 1959, Urecal replaced actress Hope Emerson as nightclub owner "Mother" for season 2 of the private detective series Peter Gunn.

Urecal appeared on the Walter Brennan ABC sitcom The Real McCoys in the series 1960 episode "The Gigolo" and in the Western series Whispering Smith in the episode "Swift Justice". She was cast as a maid in the 1961 episode "Call Me Mother" of the CBS sitcom Angel, starring Annie Fargé. In 1965 she made her second appearance on Perry Mason, this time as Martha Glenhorn in "The Case of the Lover's Gamble", as well as appearing as Martha Winslow in the rural sitcom Petticoat Junction in an episode entitled 'A Tale of Two Dogs'. Her final television appearance was the following year when she played Mrs. Griffin on an episode entitled 'Billie Jo's Independence Day' of Petticoat Junction.

== Personal life and death ==
Urecal was married to Max Holtzer.

Urecal died in 1966 from a heart attack in Glendale, California, aged 71. She was buried in Hollywood Forever Cemetery

== Selected filmography ==
- Her Bodyguard (1933) - Lingerie Clerk (uncredited)
- Bombshell (1933) - Autograph Seeker (uncredited)
- Meet the Baron (1933) - Downstairs Maid (uncredited)
- Sadie McKee (1934) - Brennan's Cook's Assistant (uncredited)
- Straight Is the Way (1934) - Woman Assisting the Clapmans (uncredited)
- Student Tour (1934) - Wife (uncredited)
- Biography of a Bachelor Girl (1935) - Ms. Bella 'Bell' Clark (uncredited)
- It Happened in New York (1935) - Spinster (uncredited)
- Man on the Flying Trapeze (1935) - Italian Woman in Ambulance (uncredited)
- Bonnie Scotland (1935) - Storekeeper (uncredited)
- Here Comes the Band (1935) - Italian Wife (uncredited)
- His Night Out (1935) - Wife (uncredited)
- Love on a Bet (1936) - Miss Jones - MacCreigh's Secretary (uncredited)
- Three Godfathers (1936) - Parishioner (uncredited)
- Fury (1936) - Fanny (uncredited)
- Bulldog Edition (1936) - Mrs. George Poppupoppalas (uncredited)
- God's Country and the Woman (1937) - Maisie (uncredited)
- Her Husband's Secretary (1937) - Miss Baldwin
- Oh, Doctor (1937) - Death Watch Mary Mackleforth
- Mountain Justice (1937) - Ella Crippen (uncredited)
- Charlie Chan at the Olympics (1937) - Gang Member Posing as Olympics Matron (uncredited)
- The Go Getter (1937) - Cappy Ricks' Secretary
- Ever Since Eve (1937) - Bellden's Receptionist (uncredited)
- Love in a Bungalow (1937) - Mrs. Kester
- Behind the Mike (1937) - Mrs. Reilly
- Life Begins with Love (1937) - Mrs. Murphy
- She Loved a Fireman (1937) - Nurse Purdy (uncredited)
- Exiled to Shanghai (1937) - Claire
- Paradise for Three (1938) - Hotel Guest Reading in Bed (uncredited)
- Prison Nurse (1938) - Sutherland
- Start Cheering (1938) - Miss Grimley
- The Lady in the Morgue (1938) - Mrs. Horn (uncredited)
- Air Devils (1938) - Margaret Price
- The Devil's Party (1938) - Maria - Jerry's Housekeeper (uncredited)
- Wives Under Suspicion (1938) - Lady in Courtroom (uncredited)
- City Streets (1938) - Mrs. Grimley (uncredited)
- Frontier Scout (1938) - Helen
- Dramatic School (1938) - Rose - Boulin's Secretary (uncredited)
- Thanks for Everything (1938) - Hatchet-Faced Woman (uncredited)
- Four Girls in White (1939) - Miss Perch - a Nurse (uncredited)
- You Can't Cheat an Honest Man (1939) - Screaming Spinster at Circus (uncredited)
- Let Us Live (1939) - Charwoman at Theatre Hold-Up (uncredited)
- S.O.S. Tidal Wave (1939) - (uncredited)
- Unexpected Father (1939) - Neighbor (uncredited)
- Second Fiddle (1939) - Miss Bland, the School Principal (uncredited)
- Should Husbands Work? (1939) - Noisy Neighbor (uncredited)
- Golden Boy (1939) - Grocery Customer (uncredited)
- No Place to Go (1939) - Miss Rice (uncredited)
- Dancing Co-Ed (1939) - Woman on Radio (voice, uncredited)
- Sabotage (1939) - Minor Role (uncredited)
- Little Accident (1939) - Woman (uncredited)
- Missing Evidence (1939) - Amy, Housewife (uncredited)
- Destry Rides Again (1939) - Mrs. DeWitt (uncredited)
- The Sagebrush Family Trails West (1940) - Widow Gail
- You Can't Fool Your Wife (1940) - Mrs. Doolittle
- Boys of the City (1940) - Agnes
- Wildcat Bus (1940) - Old Maid (uncredited)
- No, No, Nanette (1940) - Woman in Airport (uncredited)
- The San Francisco Docks (1940) - Landlady (uncredited)
- Six Lessons from Madame La Zonga (1941) - Irate Woman (uncredited)
- The Wild Man of Borneo (1941) - Mother of Baby (scenes deleted)
- Arkansas Judge (1941) - Miranda Wolfson
- Golden Hoofs (1941) - Myrt (uncredited)
- The Trial of Mary Dugan (1941) - Landlady (uncredited)
- Murder Among Friends (1941) - Mrs. O'Heaney (uncredited)
- A Man Betrayed (1941) - Librarian (uncredited)
- The Cowboy and the Blonde (1941) - Murphy
- Murder by Invitation (1941) - Maxine Denham
- Accent on Love (1941) - Teresa Lombroso
- Bowery Blitzkrieg (1941) - 'Picklepuss' - Reform School Matron (uncredited)
- Dressed to Kill (1941) - Landlady (uncredited)
- Man at Large (1941) - Mrs. Jones, Nervous Man's Wife
- Sailors on Leave (1941) - Crusty Woman (uncredited)
- Never Give a Sucker an Even Break (1941) - The Cleaning Woman
- Moon Over Her Shoulder (1941) - Mrs. Duggins - Scoutmistress (uncredited)
- They Died with Their Boots On (1941) - Nurse (uncredited)
- Skylark (1941) - Woman in Subway Car (uncredited)
- Marry the Boss's Daughter (1941) - Elevator Passenger (uncredited)
- Lady for a Night (1942) - Spinster in Audience (uncredited)
- A Tragedy at Midnight (1942) - Mattie - Housekeeper (uncredited)
- My Favorite Blonde (1942) - Stone-Faced Woman (uncredited)
- The Corpse Vanishes (1942) - Fagah
- In Old California (1942) - Mrs. Carson (uncredited)
- Henry and Dizzy (1942) - Mrs. Kilmer (uncredited)
- Beyond the Blue Horizon (1942) - Wife at Circus (uncredited)
- Sons of the Pioneers (1942) - Ellie Bixby
- Sweater Girl (1942) - Melinda
- The Man in the Trunk (1942) - Peggy's Landlady (uncredited)
- Henry Aldrich, Editor (1942) - Miss Schwellenhorn (uncredited)
- Daring Young Man (1942) - Nurse (uncredited)
- Riding Through Nevada (1942) - Widow Humbolt
- That Other Woman (1942) - Mrs. MacReady
- The Living Ghost (1942) - Delia Phillips
- Quiet Please, Murder (1942) - Cookbook-Seeking Library Patron (uncredited)
- Shadow of a Doubt (1943) - Mrs. Henderson (uncredited)
- The Powers Girl (1943) - Maggie (uncredited)
- Kid Dynamite (1943) - Judge
- Something to Shout About (1943) - Mrs. Starretton (uncredited)
- The Ape Man (1943) - Agatha Brewster
- Dixie Dugan (1943) - Mrs. Wilson (uncredited)
- Keep 'Em Slugging (1943) - Miss Billings (uncredited)
- White Savage (1943) - Native Woman (uncredited)
- A Stranger in Town (1943) - Lady Stepping Off Train (uncredited)
- Hit the Ice (1943) - Wife at Hospital (uncredited)
- Ghosts on the Loose (1943) - Hilda
- Wagon Tracks West (1943) - Landlady (uncredited)
- So This Is Washington (1943) - Mrs. Pomeroy (uncredited)
- Dangerous Blondes (1943) - Mrs. Swanson, Housekeeper (uncredited)
- My Kingdom for a Cook (1943) - Woman in Employment Office (uncredited)
- Klondike Kate (1943) - Sarah (uncredited)
- The Song of Bernadette (1943) - Woman Describing Baby's Recovery (uncredited)
- The Bridge of San Luis Rey (1944) - Uncle Pio's Servant (uncredited)
- Mr. Skeffington (1944) - Woman in Beauty Shop / Nightclub Patron (uncredited)
- Man from Frisco (1944) - Widow Allison (uncredited)
- Louisiana Hayride (1944) - Ma Crocker
- Block Busters (1944) - Amelia Rogiet
- When Strangers Marry (1944) - Landlady (uncredited)
- Kismet (1944) - Retainer (uncredited)
- The Doughgirls (1944) - Hatchet-Faced Woman (uncredited)
- Moonlight and Cactus (1944) - Abigail
- Music in Manhattan (1944) - Mrs. Smith, the Landlady (uncredited)
- The Mark of the Whistler (1944) - Woman Sweeping Front Stoop (uncredited)
- Irish Eyes Are Smiling (1944) - Militant Wife (uncredited)
- One Mysterious Night (1944) - Miss Wilkinson (uncredited)
- And Now Tomorrow (1944) - Patient (uncredited)
- Crazy Knights (1944) - Mrs. Benson
- The Kid Sister (1945) - Mrs. Wiggins
- Salty O'Rourke (1945) - Saleslady (uncredited)
- A Medal for Benny (1945) - Mrs. Chavez (uncredited)
- Wanderer of the Wasteland (1945) - Mama Rafferty
- A Bell for Adano (1945) - Italian Woman (uncredited)
- Mr. Muggs Rides Again (1945) - Nora 'Ma' Brown
- State Fair (1945) - Woman Congratulating Mrs. Metcalf (uncredited)
- Men in Her Diary (1945) - Mrs. Braun
- George White's Scandals (1945) - Teacher (scenes deleted)
- Sensation Hunters (1945) - Edna Rogers
- Voice of the Whistler (1945) - Georgie's Wife (uncredited)
- The Bells of St. Mary's (1945) - Landlady (uncredited)
- Who's Guilty? (1945) - Mrs. Dill
- Breakfast in Hollywood (1946) - Miss Mullins (uncredited)
- Partners in Time (1946) - Miss Abernathy (uncredited)
- The Virginian (1946) - Christopher's Mother (uncredited)
- The Dark Corner (1946) - Client Wife (uncredited)
- The Bride Wore Boots (1946) - Minor Role (uncredited)
- Rainbow Over Texas (1946) - Mama Lolita
- The Well-Groomed Bride (1946) - Woman (uncredited)
- Without Reservations (1946) - Sue (uncredited)
- Little Miss Big (1946) - Woman (uncredited)
- No Leave, No Love (1946) - Mrs. Hanlon's Friend (uncredited)
- Crime Doctor's Man Hunt (1946) - Second Landlady (uncredited)
- Sioux City Sue (1946) - Mrs. Abercrombie - Elite Hotel Manager (uncredited)
- The Trap (1946) - Miss Weebles, the Housekeeper
- Wake Up and Dream (1946) - Mrs. Edna Lucash (uncredited)
- Ladies' Man (1947) - Mrs. Ryan (uncredited)
- California (1947) - Emma (uncredited)
- Apache Rose (1947) - Felicia
- The Devil Thumbs a Ride (1947) - Mrs. Barnaby (uncredited)
- Undercover Maisie (1947) - Delicatessen Woman (uncredited)
- Blaze of Noon (1947) - Woman in Church (uncredited)
- Saddle Pals (1947) - Cora Downey (uncredited)
- High Conquest (1947) - Miss Woodley - replaced by Mary Field (scenes deleted)
- Heartaches (1947) - Charwoman (uncredited)
- The Secret Life of Walter Mitty (1947) - Woman with Hat (uncredited)
- Cynthia (1947) - Agnes, Jannings' Cook (uncredited)
- Bowery Buckaroos (1947) - U.S. Marshal Kate T. Barlow
- The Lost Moment (1947) - Maria
- Sitting Pretty (1948) - Mrs. Maypole (uncredited)
- April Showers (1948) - Landlady (uncredited)
- The Noose Hangs High (1948) - Husky Woman (uncredited)
- Fury at Furnace Creek (1948) - Mrs. Crum (uncredited)
- Secret Service Investigator (1948) - Mrs. McGiven- Landlady
- Marshal of Amarillo (1948) - Mrs. Henry Pettigrew
- Night Has a Thousand Eyes (1948) - Elderly Italian Woman (uncredited)
- Good Sam (1948) - Mrs. Nelson
- The Strange Mrs. Crane (1948) - Nellie Carter - Juror (uncredited)
- The Snake Pit (1948) - Ward 33 Inmate (uncredited)
- Sundown in Santa Fe (1948) - Ella Mae Watson
- Joan of Arc (1948) - Old Woman (uncredited)
- Family Honeymoon (1948) - Mrs. Webb (uncredited)
- Down to the Sea in Ships (1949) - Mother (uncredited)
- Big Jack (1949) - Mrs. Summers (uncredited)
- The Lovable Cheat (1949) - Virginie
- The Doolins of Oklahoma (1949) - Train Passenger (uncredited)
- Take One False Step (1949) - Gas Station Attendant (uncredited)
- Outcasts of the Trail (1949) - Abbie Rysen
- Scene of the Crime (1949) - Woman at Crime Scene (uncredited)
- Holiday in Havana (1949) - Mama Valdez
- Song of Surrender (1949) - Bidder (uncredited)
- Master Minds (1949) - Mrs. Hoskins
- The Traveling Saleswoman (1950) - Mrs. Owen (uncredited)
- Side Street (1950) - Garsell's Landlady (uncredited)
- Quicksand (1950) - Landlady
- The Arizona Cowboy (1950) - Cactus Kate Millican
- My Blue Heaven (1950) - Mrs. 'Old Mule Face' Bates (uncredited)
- Mister 880 (1950) - Rosie (uncredited)
- The Milkman (1950) - Mrs. Dillon (uncredited)
- The Jackpot (1950) - Woman Trying on Hats (uncredited)
- Harvey (1950) - Nurse Dunphy (uncredited)
- Texans Never Cry (1951) - Mrs. Martha Carter (uncredited)
- Stop That Cab (1951) - Lucy's Mother
- The Great Caruso (1951) - Carmelita Toscano (uncredited)
- Dear Brat (1951) - Woman (uncredited)
- Mask of the Avenger (1951) - Market Woman (uncredited)
- The Raging Tide (1951) - Johnnie Mae Swanson
- Harem Girl (1952) - Aniseh
- Oklahoma Annie (1952) - Mrs. Lottie Fling
- Aaron Slick from Punkin Crick (1952) - Mrs. Peabody
- Anything Can Happen (1952) - Bus Passenger wearing black (uncredited)
- Gobs and Gals (1952) - Mrs. Pursell
- Lost in Alaska (1952) - Mrs. McGillicuddy
- Fearless Fagan (1952) - First Nurse (uncredited)
- Niagara (1953) - Mrs. McGrand, Landlady of McGrand's Boarding House (uncredited)
- She's Back on Broadway (1953) - Rick's Landlady (uncredited)
- Woman They Almost Lynched (1953) - Mrs. Stuart
- By the Light of the Silvery Moon (1953) - Toby Simmons (uncredited)
- Marty (1955) - Mrs. Rosari (uncredited)
- Double Jeopardy (1955) - Mrs. Krezi
- A Man Alone (1955) - Mrs. Maule (uncredited)
- Sudden Danger (1955) - Mrs. Kelly
- Miracle in the Rain (1956) - Mrs. Canelli
- Crashing Las Vegas (1956) - Woman (uncredited)
- Alfred Hitchcock Presents (1957) (Season 2 Episode 16: "Nightmare in 4-D") - Mrs. Bouton the Busybody
- The Adventures of Huckleberry Finn (1960) - Miss Sarah Watson (uncredited)
- Mr. Hobbs Takes a Vacation (1962) - Brenda
- 7 Faces of Dr. Lao (1964) - Kate Lindquist
- That Funny Feeling (1965) - Woman at Phone Booth
