= Footlight Serenade =

1942 film by Gregory Ratoff

- Theatrical release poster
- Directed by: Gregory Ratoff
- Screenplay by: Robert Ellis; Helen Logan; Lynn Starling
- Story by: Fidel LaBarba; Kenneth Earl
- Produced by: William LeBaron
- Starring: John Payne; Betty Grable; Victor Mature; Jane Wyman
- Cinematography: Lee Garmes
- Edited by: Robert L. Simpson
- Music by: Charles Henderson
- Distributed by: 20th Century Fox
- Release date: August 1, 1942
- Running time: 80 minutes
- Country: United States
- Language: English
- Box office: $1.4 million (US rentals)

Footlight Serenade is a 1942 musical comedy film directed by Gregory Ratoff, starring Betty Grable, John Payne, and Victor Mature.

== Plot ==
Tommy Lundy, known as the "The Body Beautiful," is a champion boxer in New York City. His appeal to women is as strong as his skills as a boxer. The comedian Slap, acting as Tommy's promoter, convinces Broadway producer Bruce McKay to stage a show starring Tommy. The plan is to have Tommy sing a few songs and then participate in a boxing exhibition on stage.

Immediately, Tommy starts alienating McKay and everyone else working on the show with his brash suggestions on song lyrics and casting. Tommy demands that McKay hire his girlfriend Estelle Evans, a nightclub singer with little talent, for the production. During an audition, he hears dancer Pat Lambert sing; Tommy decides that she should be hired also.

Pat calls her her fiancé, Bill Smith, with the good news and persuades him to come to the theater. While looking for Pat at the theater, Bill ends up in a line of applicants to be hired as Tommy's sparring partner. Tommy decides to hire him, unaware of his relationship with Pat. Bill will spar lightly with Tommy during the boxing exhibition of the show. As the show rehearsals progress, Tommy develops a romantic interest in Pat and appoints her as Estelle's understudy. Both Bill and Estelle start becoming jealous.. One afternoon, Bill and Pat get married. Meanwhile, back at the theater, Estelle finally tires of Tommy's arrogance and quits the show.

When Pat and Bill arrive at the theater, McKay and Slap happily tell Pat that she is replacing Estelle. However, they are horrified to learn that she just married Bill. Wanting to keep Tommy happy, Bill and Pat reluctantly agree to conceal their marriage until after the show opens. After the dress rehearsal, Tommy convinces Pat to go out with him, Bill and another dancer on a double date.

After dinner, Pat inadvertently leads Tommy to believe that she will marry him after the show opens. Tired of their charade, Pat and Bill decide to spend the night in a hotel. However, Estelle sees them check into the hotel and tells Tommy

On the night of the show, Tommy is furious. He believes that Bill and Pat duped him to get into the show. During the boxing exhibition segment, Tommy starts beating on Bill furiously. In between blows, Bill reveals that Pat has been his wife for over a week. A shocked Tommy stops hitting Pat and apologizes to him. A frantic Slap then enters the ring, telling them to start fighting again. Tommy and Bill then knock out Slap, to the great amusement of the crowd. The show is a smash success, and the marquee lists Pat and Bill as co-stars under Tommy.

== Cast ==
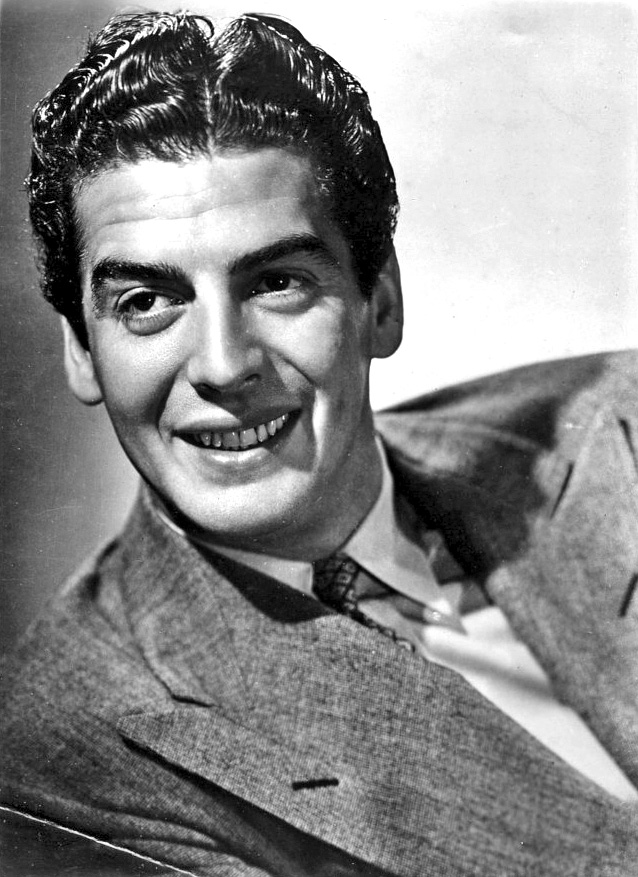
Victor Mature as Tommy Lundy

- John Payne as William J. 'Bill' Smith
- Betty Grable as Pat Lambert
- Victor Mature as Tommy Lundy
- Jane Wyman as Flo La Verne
- James Gleason as Bruce McKay
- Phil Silvers as Slap
- Cobina Wright Jr. as Estelle Evans
- June Lang as June
- Frank Orth as Mike the stage doorman
- Mantan Moreland as Amos. Tommy's Dresser (as Manton Moreland)
- Irving Bacon as Stagehand
- Charles Tannen as Charlie, Stage manager
- George Dobbs as Frank, Dance director
- Ray Walker as Reporter
- Lillian Yarbo as Estelle's Maid (uncredited)

== Soundtrack ==
Betty Grable as Pat Lambert

- Except with You (uncredited). Music by Ralph Rainger. Lyrics by Leo Robin. Sung by Cobina Wright Jr.
- Are You Kiddin'? (uncredited). Music by Rainger. Lyrics by Robin. Sung and danced by Grable
- I'm Still Crazy for You (uncredited). Music by Rainger. Lyrics by Robin. Sung by Grable and Payne
- Land on Your Feet (uncredited). Music by Rainger (instrumental only). Danced by Grable and Hermes Pan
- I Heard the Birdies Sing (uncredited). Music by Rainger. Lyrics by Robin. Sung and danced by Grable and chorus
- I'll Be Marching to a Love Song (uncredited). Music by Rainger. Lyrics by Robin. Sung and danced by Grable, Mature, Payne, chorus
- Living High (uncredited). Music by Rainger
