= Mother Machree (song) =

1910 Irish-American song

"Mother Machree" is a 1910 American-Irish song with lyrics by Rida Johnson Young and singer Chauncey Olcott, and music by Ernest Ball. It was originally written for the show Barry of Ballymoore. It was first released by Chauncey Olcott, then by Will Oakland in 1910. The song was later kept popular by John McCormack and others. It was used in films including Mother Machree (1928) and Rose of Washington Square (1939).

The song lyrics contain the words "I kiss the dear fingers so toil worn for me. Oh God bless you and keep you Mother Machree". "Machree" is an Anglicization of the Irish mo chroí [mˠə xɾˠiː], an exclamation meaning "my heart."

In Chapter 4 of James M. Cain's classic crime novel The Postman Always Rings Twice (1934), Nick the Greek sings "Mother Machree" twice in the bathtub while Frank listens outside the house, waiting for Nick's wife to bludgeon and drown her husband. The song made an appearance in the Coen Brothers' film The Ballad of Buster Scruggs when Tom Waits playing the Prospector in the segment "All Gold Canyon" sings as he appears from the thick woods leading his mule into the Gold Canyon, and at the end of the film Widows' Peak, when characters played by Mia Farrow and Natasha Richardson are finally reunited. Lyrics of the song are also briefly featured in the Scorsese film The Departed, in which Jack Nicholson playing crime boss Frank Costello sings them. The 1932 W.C. Fields-Jack Oakie comedy film Million Dollar Legs features a character named Mata Machree, a play on this song and Mata Hari.

== In Popular Media ==
- In the 1960 Rat Pack heist film Ocean's 11, Dean Martin's Character Sam Harmon changed the lyrics to Tell Your Mother Hello
