= The Cost of a Kiss =

1917 British film by Adrian Brunel

- Directed by: Adrian Brunel
- Written by: H. Fowler Mear
- Production company: Mirror Films
- Distributed by: Mirror Films
- Release date: February 1917
- Country: United Kingdom
- Language: English

The Cost of a Kiss is a 1917 British silent drama film directed by Adrian Brunel and starring Bertram Wallis, Marjorie Day and Edward Cooper. It marked the feature film debut of Brunel who went on to become a leading British director of the 1920s. It was the only film produced by Mirror Films, a company set up by Brunel and the screenwriter H. Fowler Mear.

== Cast ==
- Gordon Begg
- A.V. Bramble
- Edward Cooper
- Ethel Griffies
- Bertram Wallis as Lord Darlington

== Bibliography ==
- Murphy, Robert & Brown, Geoff & Burton, Alan. Directors in British and Irish cinema: A Reference Companion. BFI, 2006.
