= The Cowboy and the Blonde =

1941 film by Ray McCarey

- Directed by: Ray McCarey
- Written by: William Brent; Walter Bullock
- Produced by: Ralph Dietrich; Walter Morosco
- Starring: Mary Beth Hughes; George Montgomery; Alan Mowbray
- Cinematography: Charles G. Clarke
- Edited by: Harry Reynolds
- Music by: Cyril J. Mockridge
- Production company: 20th Century Fox
- Distributed by: 20th Century Fox
- Release date: May 16, 1941
- Running time: 68 minutes
- Country: United States
- Language: English

The Cowboy and the Blonde is a 1941 American western comedy film directed by Ray McCarey and starring Mary Beth Hughes, George Montgomery and Alan Mowbray. It was produced and distributed by 20th Century Fox.

== Plot ==
Rodeo rider Lank Garrett moves to Hollywood to appear in films, but soon clashes with entitled starlet Crystal Wayne in a plot that resembles The Taming of the Shrew.

== Cast ==
- Mary Beth Hughes as Crystal Wayne
- George Montgomery as Lank Garrett
- Alan Mowbray as Phineas Johnson
- Robert Conway as Don Courtney
- John Miljan as Bob Roycroft
- Richard Lane as Gilbert
- Robert Emmett Keane as Mr. Gregory
- Minerva Urecal as Murphy
- Fuzzy Knight as Skeeter
- George O'Hara as Melvyn
- Monica Bannister as Maybelle
- William Halligan as Franklyn
- Trevor Bardette as Wanee, Indian Cook
- Barbara Pepper as Chorine in Dressing Room
- Addie McPhail as Cafe Hostess

== Bibliography ==
- Fetrow, Alan G. Feature Films, 1940-1949: a United States Filmography. McFarland, 1994.
- Pitts, Michael R. Western Movies: A Guide to 5,105 Feature Films. McFarland, 2012.
