= Ethel Griffies =

British actress (1878–1975)

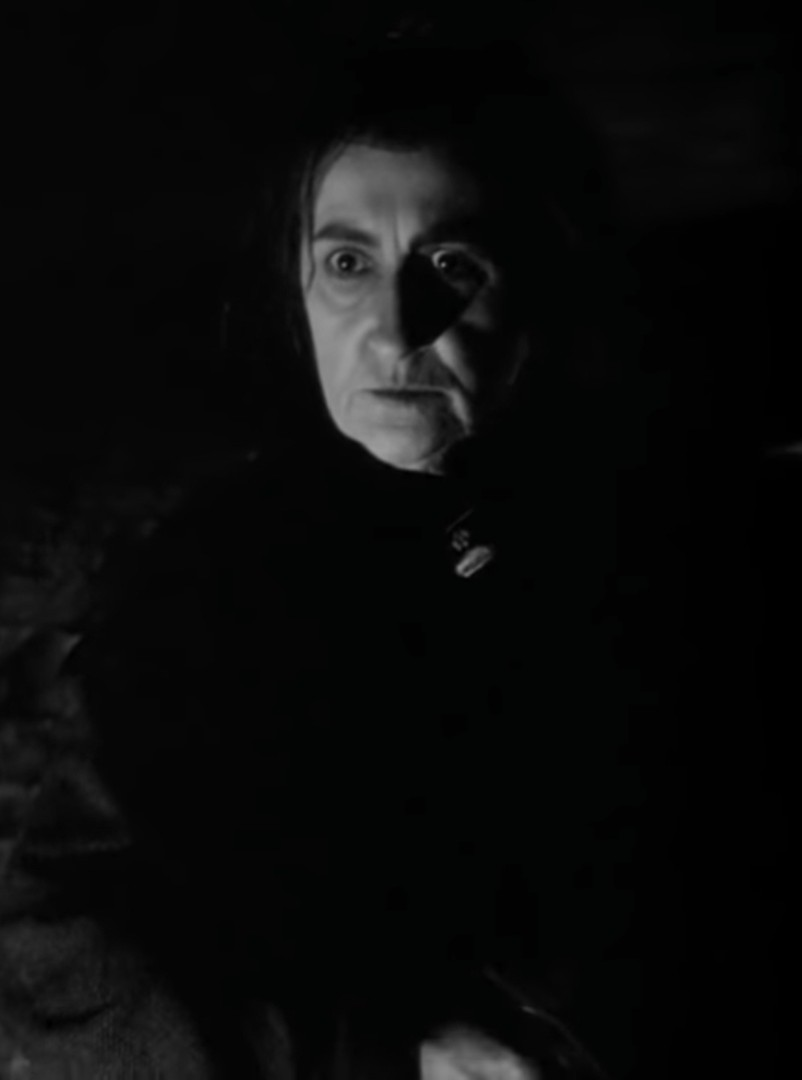
- Griffies in Jane Eyre (1943)
- Born: Ethel Woods; 26 April 1878; Sheffield, West Riding of Yorkshire, England
- Died: 9 September 1975 (aged 97); London, England
- Occupation: Actress
- Years active: 1881–1967
- Spouses: Walter Beaumont (m. 1900; died 1910) Edward Cooper (m. 1917; died 1956)

Ethel Griffies (born Ethel Woods; 26 April 1878 – 9 September 1975) was a British actress. She is remembered for portraying the ornithologist Mrs. Bundy in Alfred Hitchcock's classic The Birds (1963). She appeared in stage roles in the United Kingdom and the United States, and had featured roles in around 100 motion pictures. Griffies was one of the oldest working actors in the English-speaking theatre at the time of her death at 97 years old. She acted alongside such stars as May Whitty, Ellen Terry, and Anna Neagle.

== Biography ==
Griffies was born on 26 April 1878 in Sheffield, West Riding of Yorkshire, the daughter of actor and manager Samuel Rupert Woods and actress Lillie Roberts. Taken onstage at the age of three, she continued to act for the next 86 years. Her stage debut came in the role of Little Willie in East Lynne at the age of 2 years, 10 months.

In 1898, Griffies acted as a member of Cissie Moxon's company. She began acting in the United States in 1924.

Griffies married actor Walter Beaumont in 1900; he died in 1910. In 1917, she married actor Edward Cooper, who predeceased her by almost two decades.

On 9 September 1975, Griffies died of a stroke in London.

== Career ==
Griffies appeared in numerous plays, making her theatre debut in London in 1899. After making brief cameos in films since 1917, she began a full career in the industry by 1930 with the film version of the play Old English. She went on to appear in more than 90 film and television roles, with her career lasting until her retirement in 1967.

She played Grace Poole in two versions of Jane Eyre: the 1934 Monogram version and the better-known 1943 version. One of her last well-known roles was the elderly ornithologist Mrs. Bundy in Alfred Hitchcock's The Birds (1963). She also performed in Billy Liar the same year as The Birds.

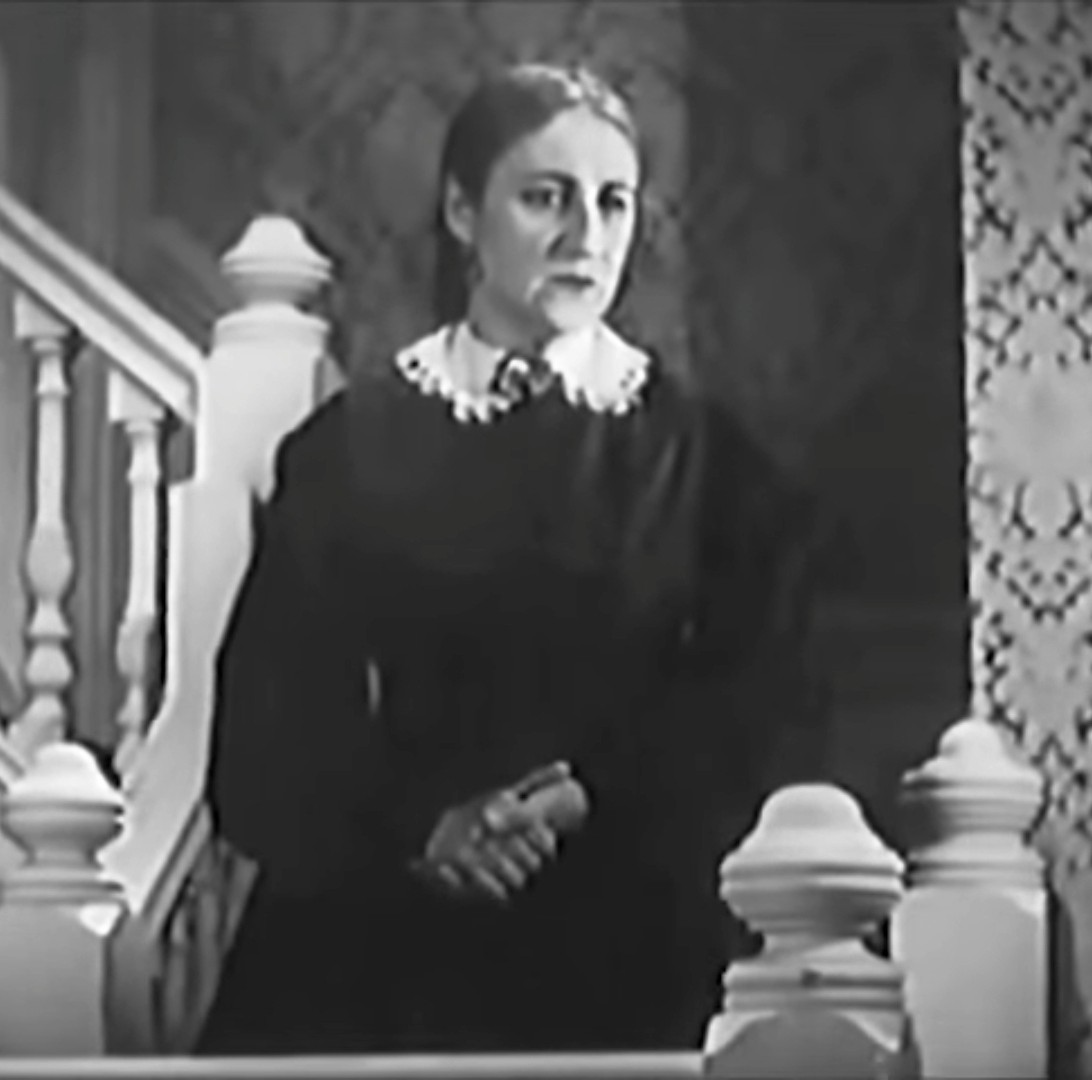
Griffies in Jane Eyre in 1934

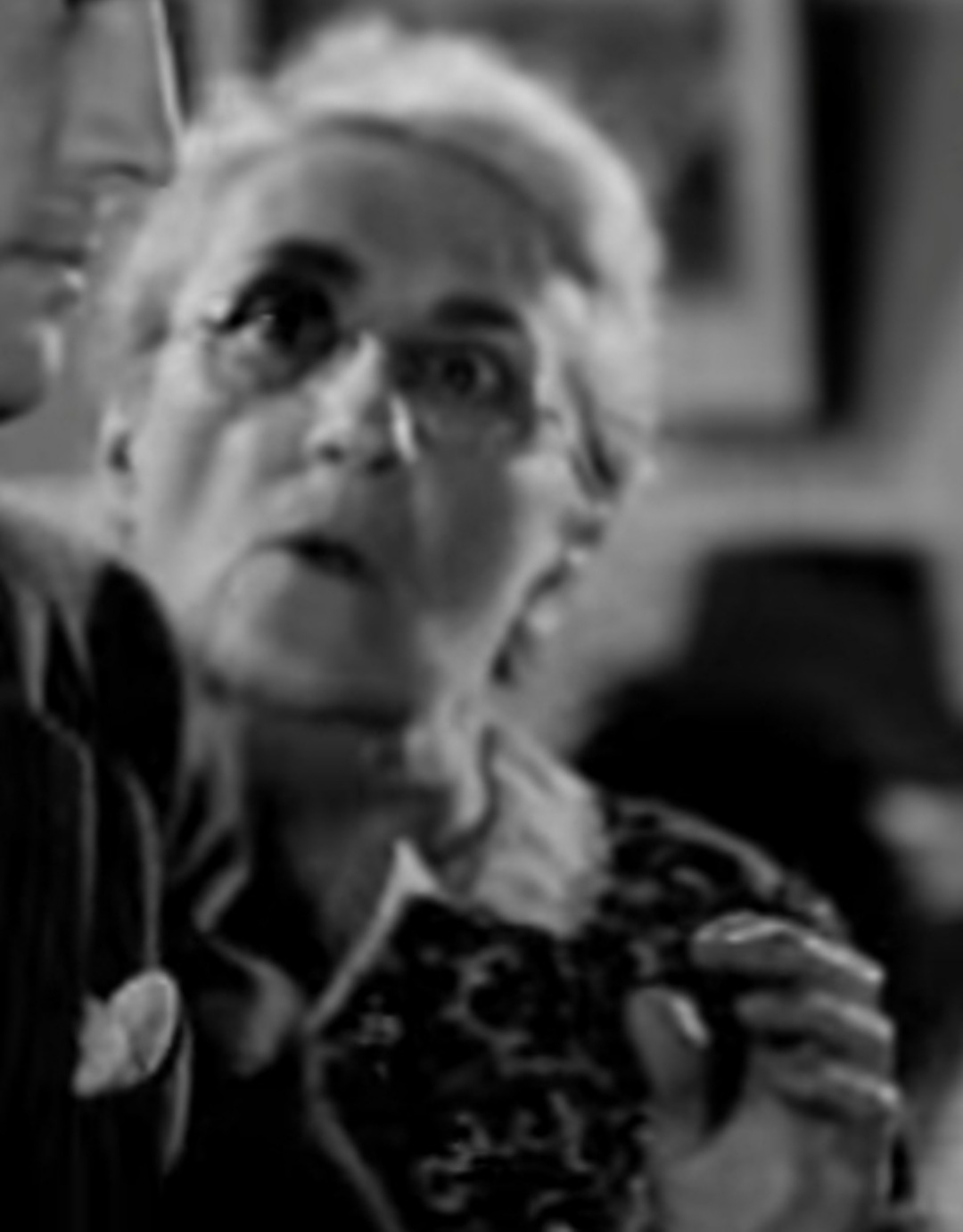
Griffies in Stranger on the Third Floor

== Filmography (selected) ==
- The Cost of a Kiss (1917)
- Hard Cash (1920) – Mrs. Hardie
- Sweet Kitty Bellairs (1930) – Gossip (uncredited)
- Old English (1930) – Adela Heythorp
- The Millionaire (1931) – Mrs. Andrews (uncredited)
- Chances (1931) – Drunken Flower Vendor in Pub (uncredited)
- Waterloo Bridge (1931) – Mrs. Hobley, Landlady
- The Road to Singapore (1931) – Mrs. Everard (uncredited)
- Once a Lady (1931) – Miss Bleeker
- Manhattan Parade (1931) – Mrs. Beacon (uncredited)
- Union Depot (1932) – Cross Woman at Magazine Stand (uncredited)
- The Impatient Maiden (1932) – Nurse Lovett
- Are You Listening? (1932) – Mrs. Peters
- Devil's Lottery (1932) – Nurse (uncredited)
- Westward Passage (1932) – Lady Caverly
- Love Me Tonight (1932) – Second Aunt
- Payment Deferred (1932) – Customer in Madame Collins' Dress Shop (uncredited)
- Evenings for Sale (1932) – Boat Passenger (uncredited)
- Tonight Is Ours (1933) – Zana
- A Lady's Profession (1933) – Lady McDougal
- Looking forward (1933) – Miss Judd (uncredited)
- Horse Play (1933) – Emily
- Midnight Club (1933) – The Duchess
- Torch Singer (1933) – Agatha Alden
- Doctor Bull (1933) – Miss Ace (uncredited)
- Bombshell (1933) – Mrs. Ward – Orphanage Representative (uncredited)
- White Woman (1933) – Mrs. Chisholm
- Alice in Wonderland (1933) – Miss Simpson the Governess (uncredited)
- Four Frightened People (1934) – Mrs. Ainger's mother
- The House of Rothschild (1934) – Guest at Reception Hall
- Stolen Sweets (1934) – Ship Passenger (uncredited)
- Sadie McKee (1934) – Woman in Subway (uncredited)
- Call It Luck (1934) – Lady Poindexter (uncredited)
- Jane Eyre (1934) – Grace Poole
- Bulldog Drummond Strikes Back (1934) – Mrs. Field
- We Live Again (1934) – Aunt Marie
- The Painted Veil (1934) – Lady Coldchester (uncredited)
- Enchanted April (1935) – Mrs. Hawkins (uncredited)
- The Mystery of Edwin Drood (1935) – Miss Twinkleton
- Vanessa: Her Love Story (1935) – Winifred Trent
- Hold 'Em Yale (1935) – Mrs. Peavey (uncredited)
- Werewolf of London (1935) – Mrs. Whack
- Anna Karenina (1935) – Mme. Kartasov
- The Return of Peter Grimm (1935) – Mrs. Martha Bartholomew
- Twice Branded (1936) – Mrs. Etta Hamilton
- Not So Dusty (1936) – Miss Miller
- Guilty Melody (1936) – Lady Rochester
- Kathleen Mavourneen (1938) – Hannah O'Dwyer
- Crackerjack (1938) – Annie
- The Mysterious Mr. Davis (1939) – Mabel Wilcox (uncredited)
- Over the Moon (1939) – Miss Bates – the governess (uncredited)
- I'm from Missouri (1939) – Miss Wildhack
- The Star Maker (1939) – Voice Teacher
- We Are Not Alone (1939) – Mrs. Raymond
- Vigil in the Night (1940) – Matron East
- Irene (1940) – Princess Minetti
- Waterloo Bridge (1940) – Mrs. Clark – Landlady (uncredited)
- Anne of Windy Poplars (1940) – Hester Pringle
- Stranger on the Third Floor (1940) – Mrs. Kane, Michael's landlady
- Dead Men Tell (1941) – Miss Patience Nodbury
- Billy the Kid (1941) – Mrs. Hanky
- A Yank in the R.A.F. (1941) – Lady Fitzhugh
- Man at Large (1941) – Mrs. Zagra
- Great Guns (1941) – Aunt Agatha
- How Green Was My Valley (1941) – Mrs. Nicholas, housekeeper
- Remember the Day (1941) – Undetermined Role (uncredited)
- Right to the Heart (1942) – Minerva Bromley
- Son of Fury: The Story of Benjamin Blake (1942) – Matron (uncredited)
- Castle in the Desert (1942) – Madame Saturnia
- The Postman Didn't Ring (1942) – Catherine Vandewater
- Between Us Girls (1942) – Gallagher
- Mrs. Wiggs of the Cabbage Patch (1942) – Mrs. Graham (uncredited)
- Time to Kill (1942) – Mrs. Murdock
- Forever and a Day (1943) – Wife of Man in Air Raid Shelter
- First Comes Courage (1943) – Nurse (uncredited)
- Holy Matrimony (1943) – Lady Vale
- Jane Eyre (1943) – Grace Poole (uncredited)
- Pardon My Rhythm (1944) – Mrs. Dean
- The White Cliffs of Dover (1944) – Woman on Train Opening Window (uncredited)
- It Happened Tomorrow (1944) – Mrs. O'Connor, Boardinghouse Tenant (uncredited)
- The Keys of the Kingdom (1944) – Mrs. Glennie (scenes deleted)
- Music for Millions (1944) – Mrs. McGuff
- The Horn Blows at Midnight (1945) – Lady Stover
- Thrill of a Romance (1945) – Mrs. Fenway
- Molly and Me (1945) – Mrs. Lamb (uncredited)
- The Strange Affair of Uncle Harry (1945) – Mrs. Nelson (uncredited)
- Saratoga Trunk (1945) – Clarissa Van Steed
- Devotion (1946) – Aunt Elizabeth Branwell
- Sing While You Dance (1946) – Mrs. Abigail Smith
- The Brasher Doubloon (1947) – Undetermined Secondary Role (uncredited)
- Millie's Daughter (1947) – Aunt Katherine
- The Homestretch (1947) – Aunt Martha
- The Birds (1963) – Mrs. Bundy, ornithologist
- Billy Liar (1963) – Grandma Florence
- Bus Riley's Back in Town (1965) – Mrs. Spencer
