= Murder Among Friends (1941 film) =

1941 film by Ray McCarey

- Theatrical release poster
- Directed by: Ray McCarey
- Screenplay by: John Larkin
- Produced by: Ralph Dietrich; Walter Morosco
- Starring: Marjorie Weaver; John Hubbard; Cobina Wright; Mona Barrie; Douglass Dumbrille; Sidney Blackmer
- Cinematography: Charles G. Clarke
- Edited by: Harry Reynolds
- Music by: David Buttolph; Cyril J. Mockridge
- Production company: 20th Century Fox
- Distributed by: 20th Century Fox
- Release date: February 28, 1941
- Running time: 67 minutes
- Country: United States
- Language: English

Murder Among Friends is a 1941 American mystery film directed by Ray McCarey and written by John Larkin. The film stars Marjorie Weaver, John Hubbard, Cobina Wright, Mona Barrie, Douglass Dumbrille and Sidney Blackmer. The film was released on February 28, 1941, by 20th Century Fox.

== Plot ==
A number of old men, who all took out mutually beneficial insurance policies many years before when in college, are being killed off. Insurance investigator Mary Lou takes up the case.

== Cast ==
- Marjorie Weaver as Mary Lou
- John Hubbard as Dr. Thomas Wilson
- Cobina Wright as Jessica Gerald
- Mona Barrie as Clair Turk
- Douglass Dumbrille as Carter Stevenson
- Sidney Blackmer as Mr. Wheeler
- Truman Bradley as McAndrews
- Lucien Littlefield as Dr. Fred Turk
- William Halligan as Dr. James Gerald
- Donald Douglas as Ellis
- Eddie Conrad as Proprietor
- Milton Parsons as Douglass
