= Tugboat Annie =

1933 film by Mervyn LeRoy

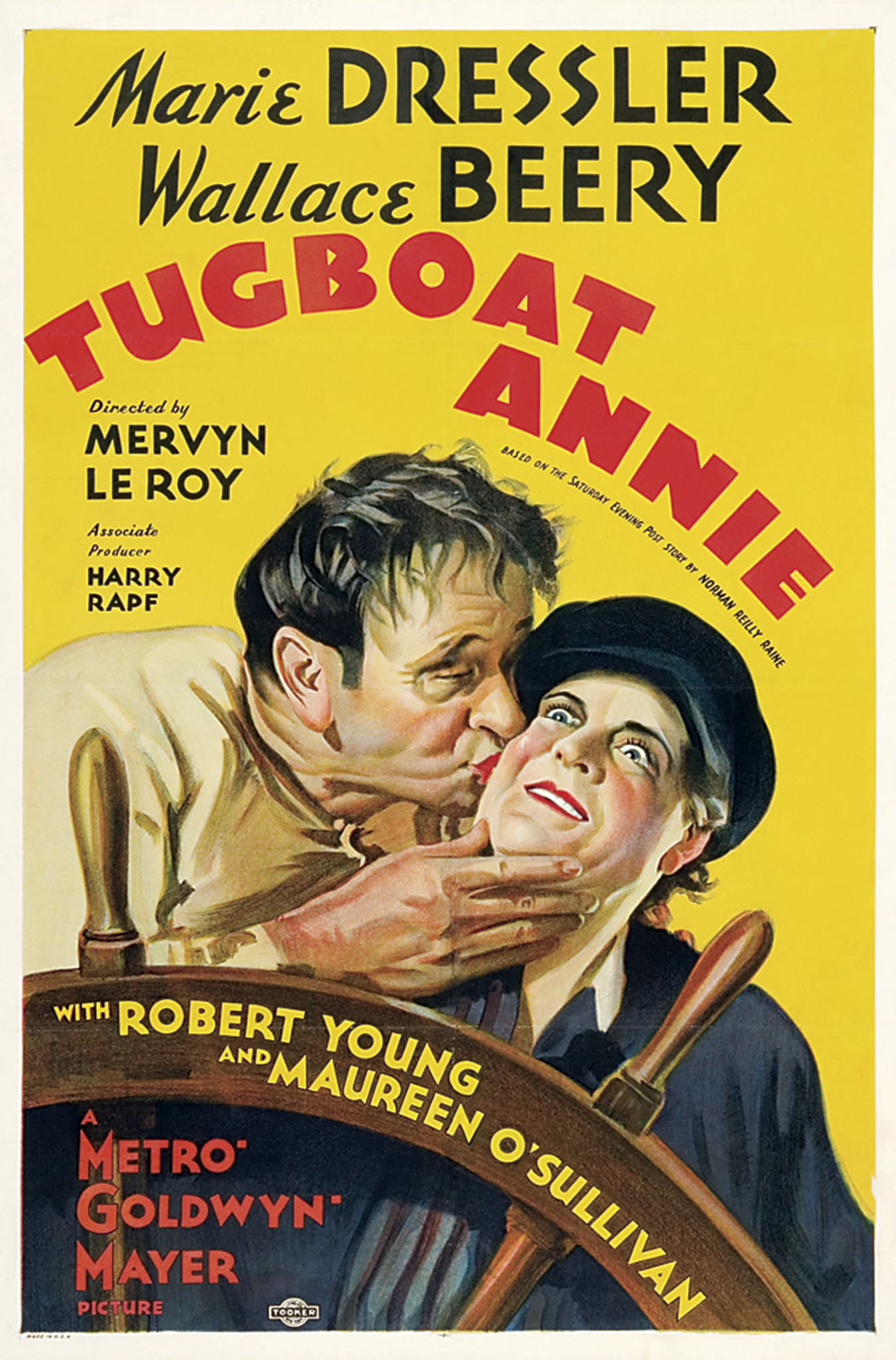
- Theatrical release poster
- Directed by: Mervyn LeRoy
- Written by: Norman Reilly Raine; Zelda Sears; Eve Greene
- Based on: Tugboat Annie stories in The Saturday Evening Post by Norman Reilly Raine
- Produced by: Irving Thalberg (uncredited)
- Starring: Marie Dressler; Wallace Beery; Robert Young; Maureen O'Sullivan
- Cinematography: Gregg Toland
- Edited by: Blanche Sewell
- Music by: Paul Marquardt (uncredited)
- Production company: Metro-Goldwyn-Mayer
- Distributed by: Loew's Inc.
- Release date: August 4, 1933
- Running time: 86 minutes
- Country: United States
- Language: English
- Budget: $614,000
- Box office: $2.6 million (worldwide rentals)

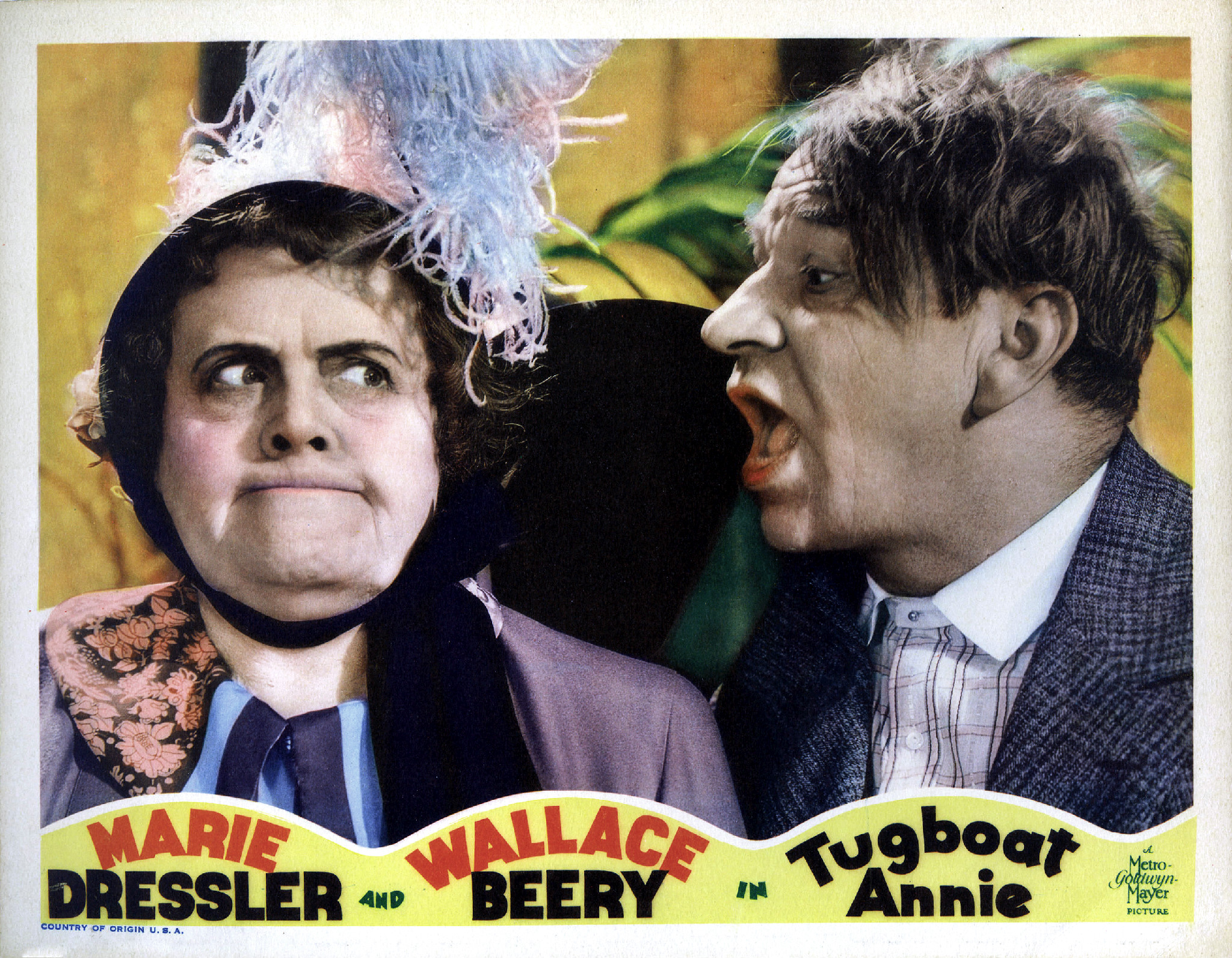
Lobby card featuring Dressler and Beery.

Tugboat Annie is a 1933 American pre-Code comedy-drama film directed by Mervyn LeRoy, written by Norman Reilly Raine and Zelda Sears, and starring Marie Dressler and Wallace Beery as a comically quarrelsome middle-aged couple who operate a tugboat.

Dressler and Beery were MGM's most popular screen team at that time, having recently made the bittersweet Min and Bill (1930) together.

== Plot ==
Annie Brennan, known as "Tugboat" Annie, is considered one of the best tugboat captains in the Pacific Northwest. She is married to Terry Brennan, an unemployed man dealing with an alcohol abuse problem. Annie and Terry have frequent fights over his drinking; however, when he is sober, she thinks him the best man in the world. Their son Alex went to school to become the young ship's master in the region.

Annie is the owner of the tugboat Narcissus. Her biggest business rival is Red Severn, another boat owner. Their relationship is complicated by Alec working for one of Severn's companies and planning to marry Severn's daughter, Pat. Annie and Terry are very happy about the relationship.

At one point, Alex helps Terry get a job with Severn. However, Terry is fired after getting intoxicated and cornering Severn in his office. An infuriated Alec begs Annie to leave Terry and stay with him, but she refuses. A short time later, Terry's negligence results in an accident that causes Annie to lose ownership of the Narcissus . The couple then find themselves sailing her as a garbage scow under someone else's ownership.

Several months later, Alec refuses to see his parents, even though Pat tries to bring them together. When Alec's ship, the Glacier Queen, is endangered by a major storm, Annie and Terry sail out to its rescue. Although the boiler on the Glacier Queen is at the breaking point, Terry fixes It. However, he suffers serious burns in the process. While recovering, Terry promises the family to stay sober. Although she knows better, Annie is happy to have her family together again and to have the whole world know what a fine man Terry is.

== Cast ==
- Marie Dressler as Annie Brennan
- Wallace Beery as Terry Brennan
- Robert Young as Alec Brennan
- Maureen O'Sullivan as Pat Severn
- Willard Robertson as Red Severn
- Tammany Young as Shif'less
- Frankie Darro as Alec, as a Child
- Jack Pennick as Pete
- Paul Hurst as Sam
- Oscar Apfel as Reynolds
- Jessie Arnold as Miss Blake - Severn's Secretary
- Vince Barnett as Cab Driver
- Robert Barrat as First Mate of 'Glacier Queen'
- Wallis Clark as Second Banker
- Willie Fung as Chow - the Cook
- Charles Giblyn as Banker John Wilcox
- Marilyn Harris as Pat Severn, as a Child
- Robert Homans as Old Salt on Schooner
- Robert McWade as Mayor of Secoma
- Hal Price as Mate on Ferry
- Jack Randall as Party Guest
- Christian Rub as Sailor
- Guy Usher as Auctioneer

== Production ==
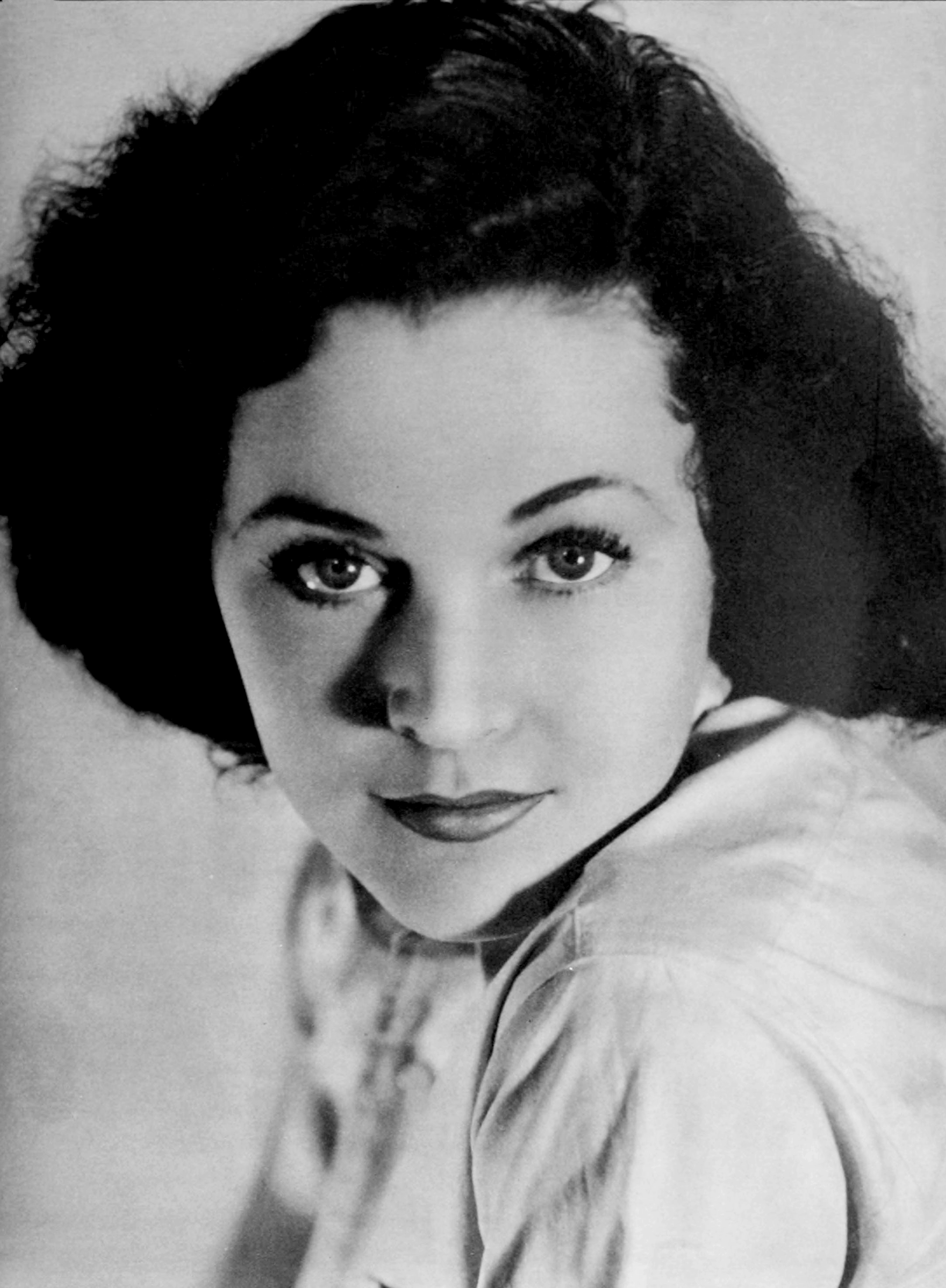
Maureen O'Sullivan as Pat

The boisterous Tugboat Annie character first appeared in a series of stories in the Saturday Evening Post, written by the author Norman Reilly Raine. They were loosely based on the life of Thea Foss, the founder of a tugboat company in Tacoma, Washington. There is also a theory that her character may have been based on Kate A. Sutton, secretary and dispatcher for the Providence Steamboat Company during the 1920s.

Tugboat Annie features Robert Young and Maureen O'Sullivan as the requisite pair of young lovers.

Annie's tugboat "Narcissus" (real name Wallowa) was owned by Foss Tug and Barge of Tacoma and had been leased to MGM for the film. The owner's son is seen rolling rope during the credits. The tugboat, renamed Arthur Foss in 1934, is the oldest wooden tugboat afloat in the world. It is on display at the Northwest Seaport in Seattle.

Filmed in Seattle, Washington, Tugboat Annie used local residents as extras, including then-mayor John F. Dore.

== Reception ==
=== Critical response ===
Leonard Maltin called it a "rambling, episodic comedy drama; inimitable stars far outclass their wobbly material." Leslie Halliwell gave it two of four stars: "Hilarious and well-loved comedy vehicle for two great stars of the period."

=== Box Office ===
The film earned $1,917,000 in rentals in the United States and Canada and $655,000 overseas for a total of $2,572,000 and made a profit of $1.1 million.

== Sequels ==
A sequel called Tugboat Annie Sails Again was released in 1940, starring Marjorie Rambeau, Alan Hale, Jane Wyman, and Ronald Reagan. Many of the publicity shots for the film were taken aboard the Arthur Foss, which had starred as Annie's "Narcissus" in the original film.

Another sequel, called Captain Tugboat Annie, came out in 1945, starring Jane Darwell and Edgar Kennedy.

A Canadian-filmed television series appeared in 1957: The Adventures of Tugboat Annie, starring Minerva Urecal, ran for 39 half-hour episodes.

== References in other media ==
- In The Railway Series book The Twin Engines, Gordon the Big Engine references Tugboat Annie when he teases Donald and Douglas about their deep-toned whistles.
- In the original 1967 version of The Producers, after Roger De Bris mentions as to why he's wearing a dress, due to him going to the choreographer ball, he claims that he looks more like the character when he is supposed to be "The Grand Dutchess Anastasia".
- The character is mentioned in the AA "Big Book" in the personal story of Dr. Bob, one of the co-founders of Alcoholics Anonymous.
- 1990s indie rock band Tugboat Annie was named for the character.
