= Accent on Love =

1941 film by Ray McCarey

- Theatrical release poster
- Directed by: Ray McCarey
- Screenplay by: John Larkin
- Story by: Dalton Trumbo
- Produced by: Ralph Dietrich; Walter Morosco
- Starring: George Montgomery; Osa Massen; J. Carrol Naish; Cobina Wright; Stanley Clements; Minerva Urecal
- Cinematography: Charles G. Clarke
- Edited by: Harry Reynolds
- Music by: Cyril J. Mockridge
- Production company: 20th Century-Fox
- Distributed by: 20th Century-Fox
- Release date: July 11, 1941
- Running time: 61 minutes
- Country: United States
- Language: English

Accent on Love is a 1941 American drama film directed and filmed by Ray McCarey and written by John Larkin. The film stars George Montgomery, Osa Massen, J. Carrol Naish, Cobina Wright, Stanley Clements and Minerva Urecal. It was released on July 11, 1941, by 20th Century-Fox.

== Plot ==
Unhappily married, John Worth Hyndman wants to leave his spouse and her father's company, Triton Realty, where he is a vice president. His wife Linda scoffs and says without his father-in-law, John wouldn't even be able to find a job digging ditches.

Trying to calm down, taking a walk, John happens across a team of actual ditchdiggers from a WPA project. He asks the foreman Manuel for a job, but Manuel is suspicious because John is well-dressed and turns him down. Manuel's daughter Osa advises John to change his appearance. In work clothes, digging voluntarily, John gets the job.

Weeks go by without the workers knowing John's true identity. Osa falls in love with him. Upset by their living conditions at home, Manuel's family protests to the landlord, who is John's father-in-law T. J. Triton.

Manuel, Osa and the others feel betrayed when they learn the truth. John wins back everyone's trust, makes Triton see the error of his ways and lets a happy Osa know that Linda has left him to get a divorce.

== Cast ==
- George Montgomery as John Worth Hyndman
- Osa Massen as Osa
- J. Carrol Naish as Manuel Lombroso
- Cobina Wright as Linda Hyndman
- Stanley Clements as Patrick Henry Lombroso
- Minerva Urecal as Teresa Lombroso
- Thurston Hall as T.J. Triton
- Irving Bacon as Mr. Smedley
- Leonard Carey as Flowers
- Oscar O'Shea as Magistrate
- John T. Murray as Wardman
- John Banner as Austrian tenant (uncredited)
