= Right to the Heart =

1942 film by Eugene Forde

- Theatrical release poster
- Directed by: Eugene Forde
- Screenplay by: Walter Bullock
- Based on: You Can't Always Tell by Harold MacGrath
- Produced by: Sol M. Wurtzel
- Starring: Brenda Joyce; Joseph Allen; Cobina Wright; Stanley Clements; Don DeFore; Hugh Beaumont
- Cinematography: Virgil Miller
- Edited by: Louis R. Loeffler
- Music by: Leigh Harline
- Production company: 20th Century Fox
- Distributed by: 20th Century Fox
- Release date: January 23, 1942
- Running time: 74 minutes
- Country: United States
- Language: English

Right to the Heart is a 1942 American comedy film directed by Eugene Forde and written by Walter Bullock.The film stars Brenda Joyce, Joseph Allen, Cobina Wright and Stanley Clements. It is based on a short story by Harold MacGrath, which had been filmed previously as Womanpower in 1926. The film was released on January 23, 1942, by 20th Century Fox.

== Plot ==
John T. Bromley III is a young man from high society who is physically humiliated by a prizefighter before his socialite sweetheart, Jenny Killian. He goes to a training camp to redeem his self-respect and ensure his success in a return engagement with the fighter.

== Cast ==
- Brenda Joyce as Jenny Killian
- Joseph Allen as John T. Bromley III
- Cobina Wright as Barbara Paxton
- Stanley Clements as Stash
- Don DeFore as Tommy Sands
- Hugh Beaumont as Willie Donovan
- Charles D. Brown as Jim Killian
- Ethel Griffies as Minerva Bromley
- Frank Orth as Pete
- Phil Tead as McAllister
- William Haade as Morgan
- Spencer Charters as Jonah

== Production ==
Cornel Wilde was due to star but fell ill and was replaced by Joseph Allen.
