= Gregory Ratoff =

Russian-American actor (1893–1960)

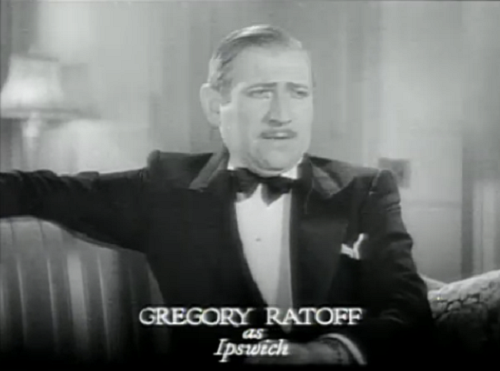
- Ratoff as Ipswich in Professional Sweetheart (1933)
- Born: Grigory Vasilyevich Ratner; April 20, c. 1893; Samara, Russia
- Died: December 14, 1960 (aged 66–67); Solothurn, Switzerland
- Occupations: Film director, actor and producer
- Years active: 1921–1960
- Spouses: Eugenie Leontovich (1923–1949; divorced); Maria Ratoff (until 1960; his death)

Gregory Ratoff (born Grigory Vasilyevich Ratner; Russian: Григорий Васильевич Ратнер; April 20, c. 1893 – December 14, 1960) was a Russian-American film director, actor and producer. As an actor, he was best known for his role as producer "Max Fabian" in All About Eve (1950).

== Early life ==
Ratoff was born in Samara, Russia, to Jewish parents. His mother was Sophie (née Markison) who claimed to have been born on September 1, 1878, but was married on June 14, 1894, when she would have been 15, to Benjamin Ratner (born 1864), with whom she had four children, the eldest of whom was Grigory, whose date of birth she gave as April 7, 1895 but later April 20 was cited as Gregory Ratoff's birthdate, and the year given as 1893, 1896 and 1897, variously. Sophie Ratner later adopted her son's stage surname (Ratoff) when she herself became a naturalized United States citizen. Sophie Ratoff died on August 27, 1955. Her date of birth is given as September 13, 1877 in the California Death Index (1940–1997), which would have made her a teenager when Gregory was born, as young as 15 if 1893 is the correct year of Gregory Ratoff's birth. Although his father's name was Benjamin, Gregory adopted the less Jewish-sounding patronymic of "Vasilyevich".

Ratoff was pursuing a law degree at the University of St. Petersburg until his education was interrupted by service in the Czar's army in World War I. After the war, he abandoned law to join the Moscow Art Theater, where he began to make a name for himself as an actor. An eyewitness to the chaos of the Bolshevik Revolution, Ratoff fled Russia with his parents in 1922 and settled in Paris, where he wooed Evgenia Konstantinovna Leontovich (later known as actress Eugenie Leontovich), the daughter of a Czarist army officer, who, too, had escaped to Paris. They were both performing in a Paris production of the Russe Revue in 1922 when the New York impresario, Lee Shubert, founder of the Shubert Theaters, brought this show to Broadway, and the young couple along with it. They decided to stay in the United States, and the couple married on January 19, 1923. Leontovich gave Ratoff's year of birth as 1896 in her naturalization papers but did not include the month or day. A border crossing manifest, dated September 23, 1922, gives both her age and that of Gregory Ratner as 29, indicating 1893 as the year of birth of both.

== Career ==
Ratoff joined in the thriving Yiddish theater in New York City, producing, directing and acting for the Yiddish Players as he became something of a theatrical impresario, even performing in a Yiddish film. He graduated to Broadway later in the decade, appearing in Shubert productions as he learned English, though his mastery of the language always was heavily accented and this, in fact, became his stock-in-trade in his busy future career as a character actor.

When the Depression hit Broadway, Ratoff headed to Hollywood, as part of the exodus of New York theater pros who were quickly snapped up by producers terrified of films with dialogue, the "talkies". He arrived in 1931 and caught a lucky break: in Gregory La Cava's Symphony of Six Million, producer David O. Selznick had insisted, very unusually for the time, that this Fannie Hurst story of a brilliant Jewish doctor escaping his tenement roots be cast with authentic Yiddish actors from the Lower East Side. His role as the beloved immigrant father who dies on his son's operating table led to five more jobs in quick succession, ranging from a George Kaufman comedy to a prestigious Selznick production, What Price Hollywood? (1932) directed by George Cukor. With these early critical and box-office winners, Ratoff was in constant demand as a character actor throughout the 1930s, many in B-pictures but increasingly with young directors who later had important careers. His role as a comic showbiz caricature was also popular, especially in such pre-Code films as I'm No Angel (1933), as Mae West's character's lawyer. Due to his large frame and uncertain command of English, he was often typecast as a villain in an American setting or as a foreigner in the dozens of 1930s films that recreated a glamorous fictional Europe on the Hollywood backlot. In Frank Lloyd's Under Two Flags (1936), he was in the French Foreign Legion. In Howard Hawks' The Road to Glory (1936), he was a Russian sergeant in World War I France.

In 1936, although he acted in six films, he first moved behind the camera, co-directing (with Otto Brower) Sins of Man for Twentieth Century-Fox. He followed with his first screenwriting effort, Cafe Metropole (1937), and soon directed on his own with Lancer Spy (1937), starring Peter Lorre, Dolores del Río and George Sanders. Ratoff directed five movies by 1939, all under contract for Fox, while still also acting. He directed Intermezzo: A Love Story (1939), when David O. Selznick was loaned Ratoff by Fox to direct his new Swedish protege Ingrid Bergman in her American debut. The original director, William Wyler, had walked out after a quarrel with Selznick. The story was a remake of the Swedish film that had made Bergman a star, a tale of doomed love between a celebrated but married violin virtuoso (Leslie Howard) and his brilliant young piano accompanist (Bergman). Bergman was none too impressed with Ratoff, reportedly because she was struggling with English herself and found Ratoff difficult to follow. Ratoff, however, saw her as "sensational", as he told Life. Leslie Howard had been talked into the part with the promise of a co-producer credit. Ratoff never reached such heights again, and he never entered the top ranks of Hollywood directors. He dropped acting and left Fox in 1941 for a Columbia directing contract.

== Later years ==
For the next decade, Ratoff directed comedies, musicals, crime dramas, war films, thrillers and swashbucklers—all solid but unspectacular fare in the wide range of genres then given to directors under contract. Song of Russia (1944), another love story between musical performers (Robert Taylor and Susan Peters), was set in Russia at the beginning of the Nazi invasion. Ratoff had been lent out for this MGM project because the musical romance had become one of his specialties after his work in Intermezzo. He collapsed near the end of shooting and had to be replaced by another emigre, Hungarian Laszlo Benedek. Taylor was a friendly witness for the House Un-American Activities Committee, and the film's two writers were hauled before the committee, questioned and harassed. Ratoff's directing career in Hollywood never recovered, and he returned to acting, playing his most famous role as the befuddled producer Max Fabian in All About Eve.

He directed a Broadway play The Fifth Season which was a hit.

Ratoff found his remaining opportunities outside of the U.S. The English comedy Abdulla the Great (1955), which he produced, directed, and starred in as a Middle Eastern potentate, proved a complete failure, but his low-budget film of Jo Eisinger's play Oscar Wilde (1960) won plaudits for Robert Morley in the title role, while Ralph Richardson was commended for his role as the barrister who destroys Wilde on the witness stand.

He was one of the two producers (with Michael Garrison) to have purchased and developed the original rights to the James Bond franchise from Ian Fleming in 1955, which subsequently became the subject of a bitter legal dispute.

Ratoff was awarded a star on the Hollywood Walk of Fame in February 1960, just months before his death in Switzerland. One of his last roles as an actor was in the epic film Exodus (1960), for Otto Preminger, a director with whom he had first worked in the early 1930s.

== Death ==
Ratoff died on December 14, 1960, in Solothurn, Switzerland from leukemia, aged 67. His body was returned to the United States for burial at Mount Hebron Cemetery, Flushing, New York. Divorced from Leontovich since 1949, he had remarried and was survived by his widow, Maria Ratoff. He was interred under a gravestone marked "Beloved Husband". His death was reported in the U.S. Reports of Deaths of American Citizens Abroad, 1835-1974 (Basel, Switzerland, December 16, 1960).

== Filmography ==
=== Director ===
- Sins of Man (1936)
- Lancer Spy (1937)
- Wife, Husband and Friend (1939)
- Rose of Washington Square (1939)
- Hotel for Women (1939)
- Intermezzo (1939)
- Day-Time Wife (1939)
- Barricade (1939)
- I Was an Adventuress (1940)
- Public Deb No. 1 (1940)
- Adam Had Four Sons (1941)
- The Corsican Brothers (1941)
- The Men in Her Life (1941)
- Two Yanks in Trinidad (1942)
- Footlight Serenade (1942)
- Something to Shout About (1943)
- The Heat's On (1943)
- Song of Russia (1944)
- Irish Eyes Are Smiling (1944)
- Where Do We Go from Here? (1945)
- Paris Underground (1945)
- Do You Love Me (1946)
- Carnival in Costa Rica (1947)
- Moss Rose (1947)
- That Dangerous Age (1949)
- Black Magic (aka Cagliostro) (1949)
- My Daughter Joy (1950)
- Taxi (1953)
- Abdulla the Great (1955)
- Oscar Wilde (1960)

=== Actor ===
- Dubrowsky, der Räuber Ataman (1921) (film debut)
- Symphony of Six Million (1932) — Meyer Klauber
- What Price Hollywood? (1932) — Julius Saxe
- Skyscraper Souls (1932) — Vinmont
- Once in a Lifetime (1932) — Herman Glogauer
- Under-Cover Man (1932) — H.L. Martoff
- Secrets of the French Police (1932) — Han Moloff
- Sweepings (1933) — Abe Ullman
- Professional Sweetheart (1933) — Samuel 'Sam' Ipswich
- Headline Shooter (1933) — Hermie Gottlieb
- I'm No Angel (1933) — Benny Pinkowitz
- Broadway Through a Keyhole (1933) — Max Mefoofski
- Sitting Pretty (1933) — Tannenbaum
- Girl Without a Room (1933) — The General / Grand Duke Serge Alexovich
- Let's Fall in Love (1933) — Max
- George White's Scandals (1934) — Nicholas Mitwoch
- Falling in Love (1934) — Oscar Marks
- Forbidden Territory (1934) — Alexei Leshki
- 18 Minutes (1935) — Nikita
- Hello, Sweetheart (1935) — Joseph Lewis
- Remember Last Night? (1935) — Faronea
- King of Burlesque (1936) — Kolpolpeck
- Here Comes Trouble (1936) — Ivan Petroff
- Under Two Flags (1936) — Ivan
- The Road to Glory (1936) — Russian Soldier
- Sing, Baby, Sing (1936) — Nicholas K. Alexander
- Under Your Spell (1936) — Petroff
- Seventh Heaven (1937) — Boul the Cab Driver
- Top of the Town (1937) — J.J. Stone
- Café Metropole (1937) — Paul
- Sally, Irene and Mary (1938) — Baron Alex Zorka
- Gateway (1938) — Prince Michael Boris Alexis
- The Great Profile (1940) — Boris Mefoofsky
- My Daughter Joy (1950) — Marcos
- All About Eve (1950) — Max Fabian
- O. Henry's Full House (1952) — Behrman (segment "The Last Leaf")
- The Moon Is Blue (1953) — Taxi Driver
- Die Jungfrau auf dem Dach (1953) — Taxi Fahrer
- The Jack Benny Program (1953) — Himself
- Abdulla the Great (1955) — Abdulla
- The Sun Also Rises (1957) — Count Mippipopolous
- Once More, with Feeling! (1960) — Maxwell Archer
- Exodus (1960) — Lakavitch
- The Big Gamble (1961) — Kaltenberg (posthumously released, final film)
