= Rose of Washington Square =

1939 film by Gregory Ratoff

- Directed by: Gregory Ratoff
- Screenplay by: Nunnally Johnson
- Story by: John Larkin; Jerry Horwin
- Produced by: Nunnally Johnson; Darryl F. Zanuck
- Starring: Tyrone Power; Alice Faye; Al Jolson; William Frawley; Joyce Compton; Hobart Cavanaugh
- Cinematography: Karl Freund
- Edited by: Louis R. Loeffler
- Music by: Gene Rose
- Production company: 20th Century Fox
- Distributed by: 20th Century Fox
- Release date: May 5, 1939
- Running time: 86 minutes
- Country: United States
- Language: English

Rose of Washington Square is a 1939 American musical drama film, featuring the already well-known popular song with the same title. Set in 1920s New York City, the film focuses on singer Rose Sargent and her turbulent relationship with con artist Barton DeWitt Clinton, whose criminal activities threaten her professional success in the Ziegfeld Follies.

Although the names of the principal characters were changed, the plot was inspired by vaudeville entertainer Fanny Brice's career and marriage to gambler Nicky Arnstein (both the film's title song and "My Man" were closely associated with Brice), and Brice sued 20th Century Fox for $750,000. The studio settled out of court for an undisclosed amount.

Written by Nunnally Johnson (who co-produced with Darryl F. Zanuck) and directed by Gregory Ratoff, it stars Alice Faye, Tyrone Power and Al Jolson, with a supporting cast that includes William Frawley, Joyce Compton, Hobart Cavanaugh, Moroni Olsen, Charles Lane, and Louis Prima.

== Plot ==
Ted Cotter, a successful Broadway minstrel performer, spots Rose Sargent performing in a vaudeville amateur night. He immediately takes a personal and professional interest in her, helping her career along as she joins the famed Ziegfeld Follies and begins to achieve stardom.

Cotter has troubles with his own act. One night, emboldened by alcohol, meek Whitey Boone heckles Cotter unmercifully from a box seat. The audience loves it, thinking it is part of the show. Cotter later discovers his manager Harry Long has hired the little man as a permanent part of the act.

Rose does not recognize Ted's love for her, falling instead for Bart Clinton, a gambler and con man. Bart's nefarious activities get him arrested, and after Ted puts up his bail, Bart skips town. Rose pines away for him, until one night, when Bart goes to the Follies and hears her tearful rendition of the song "My Man", he realizes the error of his ways and sets out to make things right. As Bart is sent away for a 5-year prison sentence, Rose says "I'll be waiting, darling!"

== Cast ==
- Tyrone Power as Barton Dewitt Clinton
- Alice Faye as Rose Sargent
- Al Jolson as Ted Cotter
- Moroni Olsen as Major Buck Russell
- Winifred Harris as Mrs. Russell
- William Frawley as Harry Long, Rose's manager/agent
- Joyce Compton as Peggy
- Ben Welden as Toby
- Louis Prima as the Bandleader
- Hobart Cavanaugh as Whitey Boone
- Charles C. Wilson as Police Lt. Mike Cavanaugh
- Ralph Dunn as Police Officer
- William Newell as Hotel Desk Clerk
- James C. Morton as Bartender at speakeasy
- Brooks Benedict as Drunk Heckler in theatre box
- Charles Lane as Sam Kress, Booking Agent
- Adrian Morris as Jim
- E.E. Clive as Barouche Driver
- Chick Chandler as Emcee at after-show cast party
- Veloz and Yolanda - Specialty Dancers in title song
- Harry Hayden as Dexter
- Maurice Cass as Mr. Mok, furniture buyer
- Paul E. Burns as Chump
- Hal K. Dawson as Chump
- Murray Alper as Eddie, candy butcher in theatre
- Charles Tannen as Newspaper Reporter
- Leonard Kibrick as Newsboy
- Bert Roach as Mr. Paunch
- John Hamilton as Judge
- Paul Stanton as District Attorney
- James Flavin as Guard taking Bart to prison

== Songs ==
- "Pretty Baby" – Al Jolson
- "I'm Sorry I Made You Cry" – Alice Faye
- "Ja-Da" – Alice Faye
- "The Vamp" – Alice Faye and chorus
- "I'm Always Chasing Rainbows" – orchestral
  - Alice Faye's vocal cut from film, on DVD as an "extra"
- "Rock-a-Bye Your Baby with a Dixie Melody" – Al Jolson
- "I'm Just Wild About Harry" – Alice Faye
- "California, Here I Come" – Al Jolson
- "Toot, Toot, Tootsie (Goo' Bye!)" – Al Jolson
  - "April Showers"/"Avalon" – Al Jolson (cut from film,
    on DVD as an "extra")
- "The Japanese Sandman" – orchestral
- "Rose of Washington Square" – sung by Alice Faye,
  with specialty dancers Igor and Tanya in interlude
- "Mother Machree"
- "I'll See You in My Dreams" – Alice Faye (cut from film;
  on DVD as an "extra")
- "I Never Knew Heaven Could Speak" – Alice Faye
- "Yoo Hoo"
- "My Mammy" – Al Jolson
- "My Man" – Alice Faye (Note: Three songs - two performed by Alice Faye ("I'm Always Chasing Rainbows" and "I'll See You in My Dreams") and Al Jolson ("April Showers"/"Avalon") were cut from the final film. However, all three songs survive as filmed and are included on both the audio CD and DVD as "extras".)

== See also ==
- Funny Girl (musical), 1965 stage version of the Brice–Arnstein story
- Funny Girl (film), 1968 adaptation of the 1965 musical
