= Cafe Metropole =

1937 film by Edward H. Griffith

- Theatrical release poster
- Directed by: Edward H. Griffith
- Screenplay by: Jacques Deval
- Story by: Gregory Ratoff
- Produced by: Darryl F. Zanuck; Nunnally Johnson
- Starring: Loretta Young; Tyrone Power; Adolphe Menjou
- Cinematography: Lucien N. Andriot
- Edited by: Irene Morra
- Music by: David Buttolph; Cyril J. Mockridge
- Production company: Twentieth Century Fox
- Distributed by: Twentieth Century Fox
- Release date: May 7, 1937
- Running time: 83 minutes
- Country: United States
- Language: English

Cafe Metropole is a 1937 American romantic comedy film directed by Edward H. Griffith and starring Loretta Young, Tyrone Power and Adolphe Menjou. It was produced and distributed by 20th Century Fox. The screenplay was based on an original story by Gregory Ratoff who also appears in the film. It is part of the tradition of screwball comedies which was at its height during the decade. It was commercially successful on its release.

== Plot ==
In Paris in 1937, Victor Lobard owns the exclusive Café Metropole. One night, he must expel drunk American Alexander Brown after closing time. He is then visited by Maxl Schinner, who had lent Victor 900,000 francs (which he embezzled), and Victor has repaid nothing. Victor asks for another 60,000 francs and promises to repay everything at 6:00 the next evening. Maxl gives him the money.

Victor risks the 60,000 francs at baccarat and wins 420,000 more. Alexander wagers the full amount against him, but loses. Victor seemingly has the money he needs, but then Brown confesses that he is penniless. Victor makes a deal with Alexander, convincing him to impersonate a Russian nobleman, Prince Alexis Paneiev, and to romance heiress Laura Ridgeway, the daughter of Victor's old friend, so that Victor can have access to her money.

"Alexis" arrives early at the café and visits the Metropole's flower shop for a boutonnière. There he is mistaken by Laura for an employee, and Alexis is enchanted, without knowing whom she is. When Laura joins her father at their table, she asks Victor to attract some celebrities or royalty. Alexis enters and is greeted by Victor as "your highness," embarrassing Laura. Alexis dances with Laura but is summoned by a waiter to answer a telephone call. However, there is no call; the waiter is the real Alexis Paneiev. Victor manages to soothe his outraged honor and obtain his silence for 50,000 francs.

Alexander falls in love with Laura, but cannot bear to lie to her any longer. He tries and fails to discourage her love for him without revealing the sordid details and agrees to marry her. Victor has his lawyer, Monnet, present Alexander with a contract asking for money from Laura's father, Joseph Ridgeway: half a million dollars before the wedding, and the same amount after, as well as various sums for any children. This so disgusts Alexander that he tells Victor that he is through with the scheme. Victor, after trying to bluff him into submission, pretends to give up and gives him back his passport and his bad check. Then Victor tells Ridgeway that Alexis is a fraud. He cons Ridgeway into believing he bought Alexis off; Ridgeway writes him a check for a million francs to help with the costs.

Ridgeway tells Laura the news, but she surprises him by saying she knew all along. However, when he states that he bought Alexis off, Laura does not believe him. She is certain that Alexis is in trouble and insists on finding out what is going on.

Ridgeway asks the Sûreté to arrest Alexis. Instead, they jail the genuine prince. When Laura goes to the jail to see her Alexis, she is surprised to find an older man, who reveals that Victor is involved somehow. As Laura is leaving, she finds Alexander being charged with fraud. Joseph Ridgeway is arrested on the false charge that he was impersonating himself. They realize that they have all been played by Victor. They get out of jail and go back to the Café Metropole. Alexander and Laura, who are going to get married, get back the check that Alexander wrote, so he is no longer in danger of going to jail.

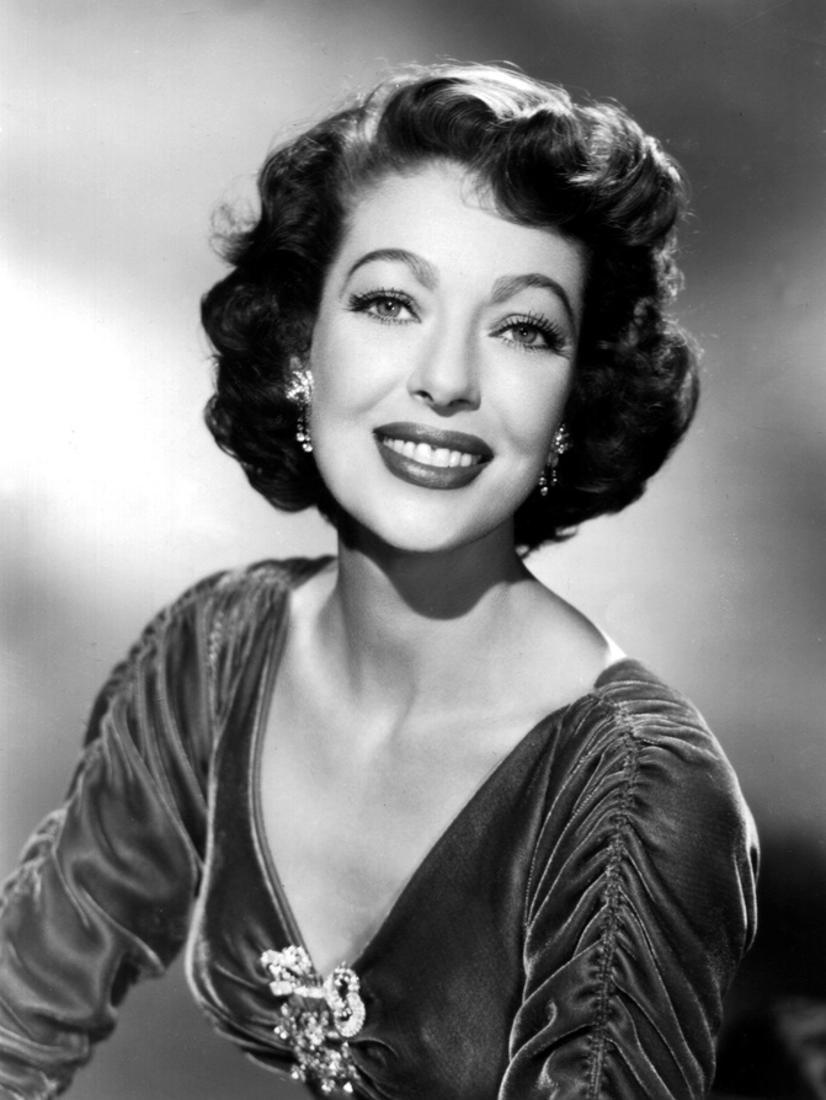
Loretta Young

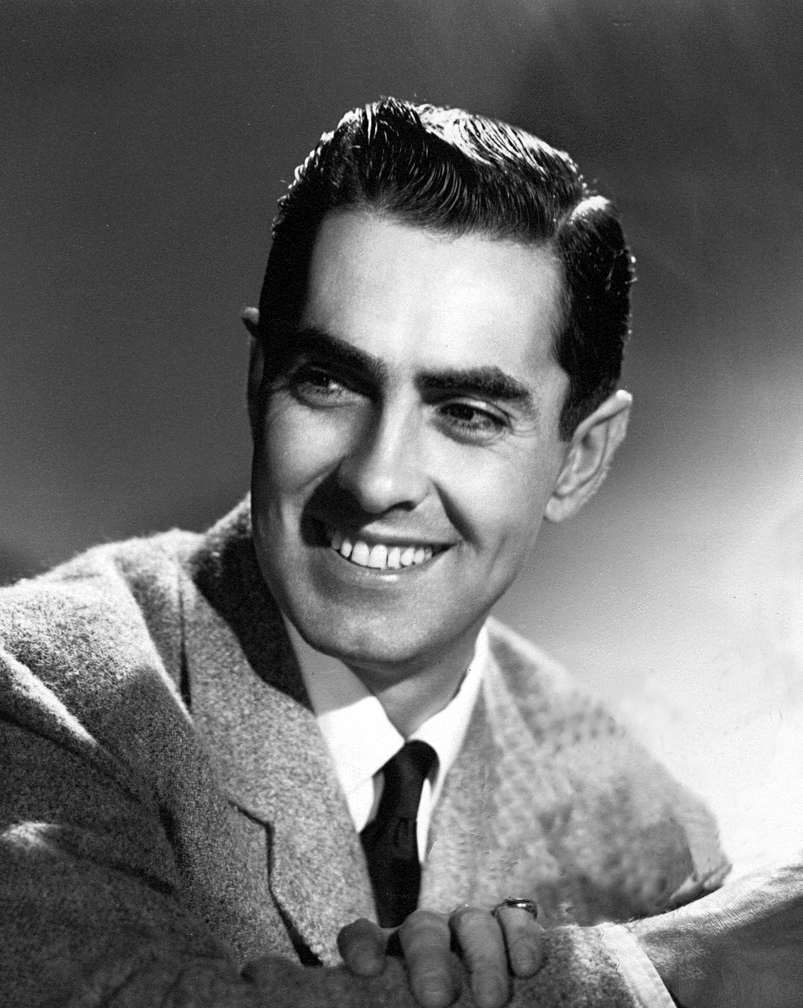
Tyrone Power

== Cast ==
- Loretta Young as Laura Ridgeway
- Tyrone Power as Alexis
- Adolphe Menjou as Monsieur Victor
- Gregory Ratoff as Paul
- Charles Winninger as Joseph Ridgeway
- Helen Westley as Margaret Ridgeway
- Christian Rub as Maxl Schinner
- Ferdinand Gottschalk as Monsieur Leon Monnet
- Georges Renavent as Captain
- Leonid Kinskey as Artist
- Hal K. Dawson as Arthur Cleveland Thorndyke
- Paul Porcasi as Police Official
- André Cheron as Croupier (as Andre Cheron)
- George Beranger as Hat Clerk (as Andre Beranger)

== Reception ==
In a contemporary review for The New York Times, critic Frank S. Nugent wrote: "[I]ts plot has a warmed-over look about it and bulks no larger than Tyrone Power's chance of winning an academy award. Yet, it comes pleasantly seasoned with comedy and it has been served with a modest flourish or two ..."

Chicago Tribune critic Mae Tinée praised Cafe Metropole: "Sparkle, zest, and a cunning touch to this scenario ... Direction was excellent and the film is beautifully put on. Not a dull moment in 'Café Metropole'—you have my word for it."

Writing in Night and Day in 1937, Graham Greene although praising the performances of the three priniciples complained of Griffith's "inferior" direction with the camera at one point "planked down four-square before the characters like a plain, honest, inexpressibly dull guest at a light and loony party."

== Bibliography ==
- Halbout, Grégoire. Hollywood Screwball Comedy 1934-1945: Sex, Love, and Democratic Ideals. Bloomsbury Publishing, 2022.
