= Something to Shout About (film) =

1943 film by Gregory Ratoff

- Lobby card
- Directed by: Gregory Ratoff
- Produced by: Gregory Ratoff
- Starring: Don Ameche; Janet Blair
- Cinematography: Franz Planer
- Edited by: Otto Meyer
- Music by: Gil Grau
- Distributed by: Columbia Pictures
- Release date: February 25, 1943
- Running time: 90 minutes
- Country: United States
- Language: English

Something to Shout About is a 1943 Columbia Pictures musical film directed by Gregory Ratoff. The film stars Don Ameche and Janet Blair, and was nominated for two Academy Awards.

The film's sets were designed by the art director Nicolai Remisoff.

== Plot ==
The film takes place behind the scenes of a fictional vaudeville play. The story centers on a recently divorced wealthy woman (Cobina Wright Jr.) who used to be a small time entertainer and decides to use part of her alimony settlement to produce and star in her own show. Unfortunately, she is not an accomplished singer, dancer or performer. Her publicity agent (Don Ameche) and she get arrested and are put in a small town jail as a publicity hoax. A very talented and unknown songwriter (Janet Blair) is tricked into taking her place in the show. It backfires as she is released and shows up at the theater. The show is a bomb and closes. The stage manager (Jack Oakie) saves the show by turning it into a vaudeville show with the talented Jeanie Maxwell as the star.

== Cast ==
- Don Ameche – Ken Douglas
- Janet Blair – Jeanie Maxwell
- Jack Oakie – Larry Martin
- William Gaxton – Willard Samson
- Cobina Wright Jr. – Donna Davis
- Veda Ann Borg – Flo Bentley
- Cyd Charisse (billed as Lily Norwood) – Lily

== Soundtrack ==
- "You'd Be So Nice To Come Home To"
  - Written by Cole Porter
  - Sung by Janet Blair and Don Ameche
- "I Always Knew"
  - Written by Cole Porter
- "Hasta Luego"
  - Written by Cole Porter
