= Quiet Please, Murder =

1942 film

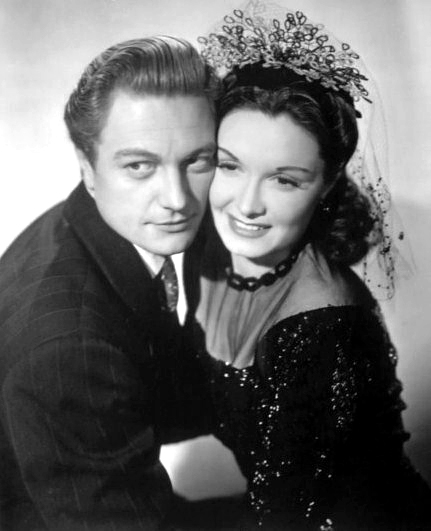
- Film still with Richard Denning and Gail Patrick
- Directed by: John Larkin
- Written by: Lawrence G. Blochman (story); John Larkin
- Produced by: Ralph Dietrich
- Starring: George Sanders; Gail Patrick; Richard Denning
- Cinematography: Joseph MacDonald
- Edited by: Louis R. Loeffler
- Music by: Emil Newman
- Distributed by: Twentieth Century Fox Film Corporation
- Release dates: December 21, 1942 (New York City); March 19, 1943 (United States)
- Running time: 70 minutes
- Country: United States
- Language: English

Quiet Please, Murder is a 1942 drama film directed by John Larkin and starring George Sanders, Gail Patrick and Richard Denning. Based on the short story Death Walks in Marble Halls by Lawrence G. Blochman that appeared in the September 1942 issue of American Magazine, it is also known under the title Death from the Sanskrit.

== Plot ==
In 1942, while World War II is raging, expert New York forger Jim Fleg steals Richard Burbage's edition of Hamlet from a public library, killing a guard in cold blood. Fleg plans to pass off his forgeries as the only surviving original copy. Six months later, however, one of his victims, Martin Cleaver, discovers he has been swindled by art dealer Rebescu and authenticator Myra Blandy (who works for Fleg). He demands his $20,000. Fleg orders Blandy to give the money back because he strongly suspects that Cleaver is working on behalf of a high-ranking Nazi, likely Hermann Göring or Heinrich Himmler, but she refuses to do so. Meanwhile, private investigator Hal McByrne traces another forgery to Blandy. McByrne pressures her to put him on Fleg's trail.

Blandy tries to solve all her problems by sending McByrne to the library to get a book, telling Cleaver that it will be Fleg who will make the pickup. Things do not go as she had hoped; McByrne is captured, but escapes. Then Cleaver is killed with a knife. Fleg, pretending to be with the police department, investigates, with his gang masquerading as policemen; it is all part of his scheme to try to steal the library's most valuable books. However, Myra gets to the books first and hides them. She also tells McByrne that the police detective is Fleg. Fleg thinks that McByrne has the books and has a henchman try to beat the information out of him, but once again McByrne gets away. McByrne figures out that he was supposed to go to the balcony where Cleaver was knifed, but Cleaver had intercepted the note, supposedly from Myra, asking him to meet her there. Fleg recaptures McByrne, but an air raid drill and the ensuing blackout enable him to escape again, temporarily. Caught yet again, he manages to deceive an air raid warden into turning the library's lights back on. This draws other air raid wardens and genuine policemen to the library; they arrest Fleg and his men. Fleg, who has several times stated he relishes punishment, seems oddly attracted to the prospect of being executed for his many crimes.

Neither Fleg nor McByrne reveal Myra's involvement, but McByrne recovers the stolen books for a sizable reward. He no longer wants anything to do with Myra and refuses the frightened woman's request to escort her home. Pahsen, a mute Cleaver henchman, follows and kills her, before being apprehended by the police. McByrne does leave with pretty librarian Kay Ryan, whom he earlier rescued from one of Cleaver's murderous thugs.

== Cast ==
- George Sanders as Jim Fleg
- Gail Patrick as Myra Blandy
- Richard Denning as Hal McByrne
- Lynne Roberts as Kay Ryan
- Sidney Blackmer as Martin Cleaver
- Kurt Katch as Eric Pahsen
- Margaret Brayton as Miss Oval, a librarian
- Charles Tannen as Hollis, the phony detective in a dark coat
- Byron Foulger as Edmund Walpole (uncredited)
- Mae Marsh as Miss Hartwig (uncredited)
- Lon McCallister as Freddie, the stack boy (uncredited)
- Paul Porcasi as Rebescu (uncredited)
- Arthur Space as Vance (uncredited)

== Reception ==
Dennis Schwartz wrote in his Ozus’ World Movie Reviews that, "It's a spirited film, with enough cheap Freudian explanations about the forger and his associate to keep you in stitches. Sanders’s typical suave performance, plus the B&W noir-like lighting, make this B-film highly entertaining."
