= Norman Reilly Raine =

American-Canadian writer (1894-1971)

- Raine (left) and Michael Curtiz (right) on the set of The Private Lives of Elizabeth and Essex (1939)
- Born: June 23, 1894; Wilkes-Barre, Pennsylvania, U.S.
- Died: July 19, 1971 (aged 77); Woodland Hills, California, U.S.
- Occupations: Screenwriter, playwright, author
- Years active: 1933–1955
- Spouse(s): Joyce Roberta Pett (divorced); Elizabeth Prudhomme (1958–1971, his death)
- Military career
- Allegiance: Canada
- Branch: Royal Canadian Air Force
- Rank: Captain
- Units: Canadian Expeditionary Force; American Legion
- Conflicts: World War I

Norman Reilly Raine (23 June 1894 – 19 July 1971) was an American screenwriter, playwright, and author. He won an Academy Award for Best Writing, Screenplay for his work on The Life of Emile Zola (1937). He was also known as the creator of the fictional character "Tugboat Annie".

== Early life ==
Raine was born in Wilkes-Barre, Pennsylvania. He began writing in 1912, when he was 17, with a job as a reporter on The Buffalo Morning Express. He also served for four years in the U.S. Navy. At the outbreak of World War I, Raine left to join the so-called "American Legion" of the Canadian Expeditionary Force. He was discharged as a captain in the Royal Canadian Air Force (RCAF).

After the war, he moved to Toronto and became an assistant editor at Maclean's magazine. In 1924, in one of his articles, he commented at about rum-running, saying "It is openly asserted by the rum runners that Canadian banks finance or help to carry, by credit and other methods, some of the larger deals put over by the trade" which The Montreal Gazette called an "outstanding statement".

Even after moving to Hollywood to work as a screenwriter, Raine was a member of the Royal Canadian Military Institute.

== Career ==
=== Broadway ===
Raine tried the Broadway stage in 1933. With Frank Butler as collaborator, he wrote Hangman's Whip, a jungle melodrama in which two well-known Hollywood actors, Montagu Love and Barton MacLane, played leading roles. It later became the 1933 film White Woman with Carole Lombard and Charles Laughton.

=== Hollywood ===
Raine wrote a series of Tugboat Annie stories for The Saturday Evening Post. In a 1940 news article, it was said he based Tugboat Annie on a female tugboat owner he knew and wanted to write a story about her; however the woman was gentle and Tugboat Annie was not. He also based Tugboat Annie on Marie Dressler after he watched Anna Christie. In 1933 he wrote the screenplay for the film, in which Marie Dressler played Annie and Wallace Beery portrayed Terry, her hard-drinking husband, with whom she traded choice insults.

A 1934 news article said Raine always worked wearing a knit cap and, when he once misplaced it, wore his wife's as a substitute. In 1950, he had been collaborating with writer Guy Gilpatric before he killed himself and his wife after she was diagnosed with breast cancer. In a 1957 article, Raine mentioned that he once wrote a story about the Battle of the Little Bighorn but was rejected by a Hollywood magnate seven times to which Raine said "I'm ready to quit, it's the best I can do. What is there about it that displeases you?" and the magnate responded "I'll tell you, I hate Indians!". He also once wrote for television, three episodes in the series Schlitz Playhouse of Stars.

Subsequently, Raine wrote many other screenplays, among them The Perfect Specimen, God's Country and the Woman, The Adventures of Robin Hood, Each Dawn I Die, The Private Lives of Elizabeth and Essex, Mountain Justice, The Fighting 69th, Men Are Such Fools, Eagle Squadron, Ladies Courageous, We've Never Been Licked, Nob Hill, A Bell for Adano, Captain Kidd and Captains of the Clouds.

Raine was a member of the Academy of Motion Picture Arts and Sciences' Board of Governors.

== Death ==
Raine died in Woodland Hills, California on July 19, 1971, at the age of 77. He was survived by his second wife.
