= Cobina Wright =

American singer, actress, and newspaper columnist

Cobina Wright, Sr.
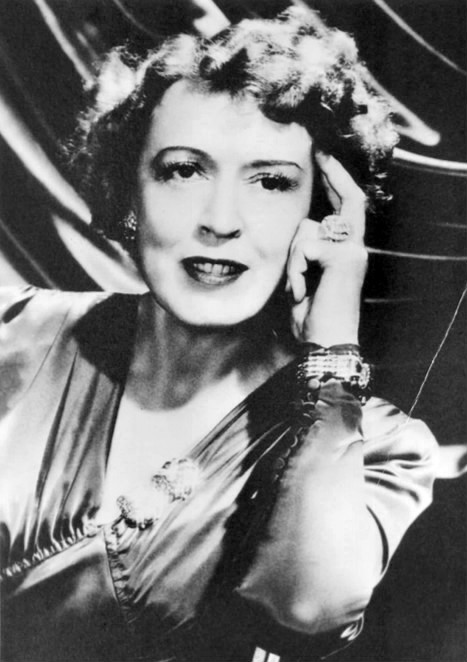
- Wright's 1949 column photo
- Born: Esther Ellen Cobb; October 20, 1887; Lakeview, Oregon, U.S.
- Died: April 9, 1970 (aged 82); Los Angeles, California, U.S.
- Other names: Esther Johnson, Esther Cobina
- Occupations: Opera singer and actress
- Known for: Syndicated gossip column

Cobina Wright Sr. (born Esther Ellen Cobb, September 20, 1887 – April 9, 1970) was an American opera singer and actress who appeared in The Razor's Edge (1946). She gained later fame as a hostess and a syndicated gossip columnist for King Features Syndicate. Wright was also known as Esther Cobb, Esther Johnson, and Esther Cobina.

== Biography ==
She was born on September 20, 1887, in Lakeview, Oregon to Benjamin M. Cobb and Della Holmes (1861–1943).

She married and divorced twice. Her first husband, whom she married in 1912, was American novelist Owen Johnson; she was his second wife, and they divorced in 1917. Her second husband was William May Wright, a stockbroker, by whom she had one child, a daughter, Cobina Carolyn Wright (aka Cobina Wright Jr.), (1921–2011), briefly a movie actress. the Wrights were divorced in 1935.

In the early part of the 20th century, she was a coloratura soprano, using the stage name Esther Cobina. She had studied singing in California, under voice teacher Nettie Snyder, and in Germany, where she initially pursued her career on stage. During World War I, she performed for French and American troops in Europe. She later made her American opera debut at Carnegie Hall in 1924.

She died in Los Angeles, California in 1970.

== Legacy ==
Wright was the author of a memoir titled I Never Grew Up (Prentice-Hall, 1952).

== Filmography ==
Year	Title	Role	Notes
1943	Danger! Women at Work	Regina	
1944	Sweethearts of the U.S.A.	Mrs. Josephine Carver	
1946	The Razor's Edge	Princess Novemali	
