= John Larkin (screenwriter) =

American screenwriter (1901–1965)

John Francis Larkin Jr. (1901–1965) was an American screenwriter.

Larkin was from New York City. His credits range from 1932 to 1950, amounting to about 30 films, and include:

- Ladies Must Love (1933)
- Charlie Chan at Treasure Island (1939)
- Charlie Chan in Panama (1940)
- The Lone Wolf Meets a Lady (1940)
- Charlie Chan at the Wax Museum (1940)
- Dead Men Tell (1941)
- Manila Calling (1942)
- Castle in the Desert (1942)
- Quiet Please, Murder (1942)
- Buffalo Bill (1944) (uncredited)
- The Dolly Sisters (1945)
- Cloak and Dagger (1946)
- Carnival in Costa Rica (1947)
- Two Weeks with Love (1950)
