= Sam Spade =

Fictional private detective

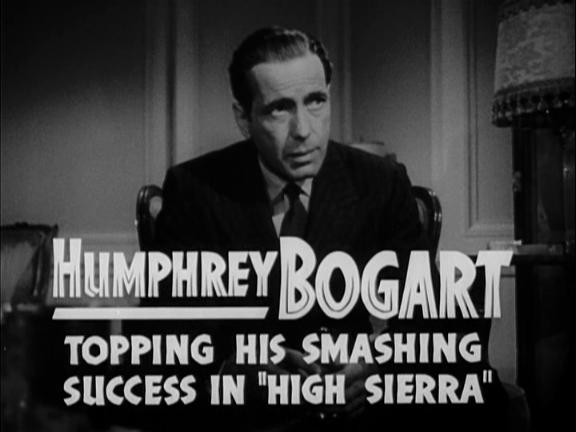
- Humphrey Bogart as Sam Spade in the trailer for The Maltese Falcon
- First appearance: The Maltese Falcon
- Last appearance: Spade and Archer
- Created by: Dashiell Hammett
- Portrayed by: Ricardo Cortez; Humphrey Bogart; Edward G. Robinson; Howard Duff; Steve Dunne; Mike O'Malley; Tom Wilkinson; Michael Madsen; Clive Owen

In-universe information
- Gender: Male
- Occupation: Private detective
- Spouse: Unnamed wife (deceased)
- Children: Sam Spade Jr. (son)
- Nationality: American

Sam Spade (Samuel Spade) is a fictional character and the protagonist of Dashiell Hammett's 1930 novel The Maltese Falcon. Spade also appeared in four lesser-known short stories by Hammett.

The Maltese Falcon, first published as a serial in the pulp magazine Black Mask, is the only full-length novel by Hammett in which Spade appears. The character, despite his scant appearances, is widely cited as a crystallizing figure in the development of hard-boiled private detective, such as Raymond Chandler's Philip Marlowe.

Spade was a departure from Hammett's nameless and less-than-glamorous detective, the Continental Op. Spade combined several features of previous detectives, most notably his detached demeanor, keen eye for detail, and unflinching determination to achieve his own justice.

== Portrayals ==
Spade was a new character created specifically by Hammett for The Maltese Falcon; he had not appeared in any of Hammett's previous stories. Hammett says about him:

Spade has no original. He is a dream man in the sense that he is what most of the private detectives I worked with would like to have been and in their cockier moments thought they approached. For your private detective does not—or did not ten years ago when he was my colleague—want to be an erudite solver of riddles in the Sherlock Holmes manner; he wants to be a hard and shifty fellow, able to take care of himself in any situation, able to get the best of anybody he comes in contact with, whether criminal, innocent by-stander or client.

=== Films ===
From the 1940s onward, the character became closely associated with actor Humphrey Bogart, who played Spade in the third and best-known film version of The Maltese Falcon. Though Bogart's slight frame, dark features and no-nonsense depiction contrasted with Hammett's vision of Spade (blond, well-built and mischievous), his sardonic portrayal was well-received, and is generally regarded as an influence on both film noir and the genre's archetypal private detective.

Spade was played by Ricardo Cortez in the first film version, released in 1931. Despite being a critical and commercial success, an attempt to re-release the film in 1936 was denied approval by the Production Code Office due to the film's lewd content. Since Warner Bros. could not re-release the film, a second version, this one a comedy, Satan Met a Lady (1936), was produced. The central character was renamed Ted Shane and was played by Warren William. The film was a box-office failure, and eventually resulted in a new version being made starring Bogart and directed by John Huston, which closely followed the novel, with a few exceptions.

George Segal played Sam Spade, Jr., son of the original, in the film spoof The Black Bird (1975). The Black Bird was panned by critics. Peter Falk delivered a more successful spoof the following year as Sam Diamond in Neil Simon's Murder by Death. This was preceded by the spoof character Sam Diamond in The Addams Family episode "Thing Is Missing" (1965) portrayed by Tommy Farrell.

Clive Owen starred as Spade in the 2024 television series Monsieur Spade, a co-production between AMC, AMC+ and Canal+.

=== Radio ===
On the radio, Spade was played by Edward G. Robinson in a 1943 Lux Radio Theatre production, and by Bogart in both a 1943 Screen Guild Theater production and a 1946 Academy Award Theater production.

The 1946-1951 radio show The Adventures of Sam Spade (on ABC, CBS, and NBC) starred Howard Duff (and later Steve Dunne) as Sam Spade and Lurene Tuttle as Spade's devoted secretary Effie Perrine, and took a considerably more tongue-in-cheek approach to the character.

BBC Radio 4 adapted The Maltese Falcon in 1984, with Tom Wilkinson as Spade, while a 2009 dramatisation for the Hollywood Theater of the Ear starred Michael Madsen.

=== Prequel ===
In 2009, with the approval of the estate of Dashiell Hammett, the veteran detective-story writer Joe Gores published Spade & Archer: The Prequel to Dashiell Hammett's THE MALTESE FALCON with Alfred A. Knopf, the original publisher of Hammett's The Maltese Falcon.

== Books ==
=== By Dashiell Hammett ===
- The Maltese Falcon (1930) (serialized in five parts, in the September 1929 to January 1930 issues of Black Mask)

=== By later writers ===
- Spade and Archer by Joe Gores (2009)
- The Radio Adventures of Sam Spade (2007) by Martin Grams, Jr., OTR Publishing, Churchville, Maryland. ISBN 978-0-9703310-7-6
- Return of the Maltese Falcon by Max Allan Collins (2026)

== Short stories ==
=== By Dashiell Hammett ===
- "A Man Called Spade" (July 1932, The American Magazine; also collected in A Man Called Spade and Other Stories)
- "Too Many Have Lived" (October 1932, The American Magazine; also collected in A Man Called Spade and Other Stories)
- "They Can Only Hang You Once" (November 19, 1932, Colliers; also in A Man Called Spade and Other Stories)
- "A Knife Will Cut for Anybody" (unpublished in Hammett's lifetime, published in 2013)

=== By other authors ===
- "Mockingbird" by Mark Coggins (July/August 2025, Eclectica Magazine; published after copyright expired)

== Collections ==
- A Man Called Spade and Other Stories (1944) (contains three Sam Spade stories from The American Magazine and Colliers—listed above)
- Nightmare Town (1999) (contains three Sam Spade stories from The American Magazine and Colliers—listed above)

== Films ==
- The Maltese Falcon (1931, Warner Bros.) (also known as Dangerous Female), starring Ricardo Cortez as Sam Spade
- Satan Met a Lady (1936, Warner Bros.) (based on The Maltese Falcon, with the character names and the object of their search changed), starring Warren William in the lead role
- The Maltese Falcon (1941, Warner Bros.), starring Humphrey Bogart as Sam Spade
- The Black Bird (1975, Columbia), a comedy sequel to the 1941 film, starring George Segal as "Sammy" Spade Jr.
- The Strange Case of the End of Civilization as We Know It (1977), played by Mike O'Malley; a Sherlock Holmes spoof in which Spade is killed by the granddaughter of Professor Moriarty

== Radio ==
- Screen Guild Theater: "The Maltese Falcon" (1943, CBS: 30-minute version of the story, starring Humphrey Bogart as Spade, Mary Astor as Brigid O'Shaughnessy, Sydney Greenstreet as Casper Gutman, and Peter Lorre as Joel Cairo.)
- Lux Radio Theatre: "The Maltese Falcon" (1943, CBS): a 60-minute version of the novel, starring Edward G. Robinson as Spade and Laird Cregar as Gutman
- Academy Award Theatre: "The Maltese Falcon" (1946, CBS): 30-minute version of the story, starring Humphrey Bogart, Mary Astor, and Sydney Greenstreet
- The Adventures of Sam Spade (1946, ABC): 13 30-minute episodes, starring Howard Duff
- The Adventures of Sam Spade (1946–1949, CBS): 157 30-minute episodes, starring Howard Duff
- The Adventures of Sam Spade (1949–1950, NBC): 51 30-minute episodes, starring Howard Duff
- The Adventures of Sam Spade (1950–1951, NBC): 24 30-minute episodes, starring Steve Dunne
- Suspense: "The House in Cypress Canyon" (December 5, 1946, CBS): 30 minutes, featuring Howard Duff
- Suspense: "The Kandy Tooth Caper" (January 10, 1948, CBS): 60 minutes, starring Howard Duff
- Maxwell House Coffee Time (aka The Burns And Allen Show): "Gracie Sends Sam Spade to Jail" (February 10, 1949 NBC) a 30-minute episode starring Howard Duff—both as himself and as Sam Spade.
- The Adventures of Babe Lincoln (circa 1950, CBS): unaired, starring Howard Duff
- Charlie Wild, Private Detective (September 24, 1950, NBC): premiere broadcast only, guest appearance Howard Duff
- BBC Radio 4: "The Maltese Falcon" (1984): starring Tom Wilkinson, Jane Lapotaire, and Nickolas Grace
- The Maltese Falcon (2009): Grammy-nominated audio play, starring Michael Madsen as Spade, Sandra Oh as Brigid and Edward Herrmann as Gutman, produced by The Hollywood Theater of the Ear and published by Blackstone Audio.

== Television ==
- Monsieur Spade (2024), a television series starring Clive Owen, a co-production between by AMC+ and Canal+.

== Comics ==
- The Maltese Falcon (1946, Feature Books #48, David McKay Publications), artist: Rodlow Willard
- Sam Spade Wildroot Hair Tonic Ads (1950s)
  - Single-page comic strips, appeared in newspapers, magazines, comic books. Tie-in with radio show The Adventures of Sam Spade, which Wildroot also sponsored. Artist: Lou Fine.
- Spade was highlighted in volume 21 of the Detective Conan manga's edition of "Gosho Aoyama's Mystery Library", the section where the author introduces a different detective (or occasionally, a villain) from mystery literature, television, or other media.
