= French Leave (novel) =

1956 novel by P. G. Wodehouse

- First edition (UK)
- Author: P. G. Wodehouse
- Language: English
- Genre: Comic novel
- Publisher: Herbert Jenkins (UK); Simon & Schuster, Inc. (US)
- Publication date: 20 January 1956 (UK); 28 September 1959 (US)
- Publication place: United Kingdom
- Media type: Print

French Leave is a novel by P. G. Wodehouse, first published in the United Kingdom on 20 January 1956 by Herbert Jenkins, London and in the United States on 28 September 1959 by Simon & Schuster, Inc., New York.

French Leave was adapted from Guy Bolton's 1938 stage play, Three Blind Mice, which Bolton wrote under the pseudonym Stephen Powys. The play had been performed in London and adapted as a film three times: Three Blind Mice (1938), Moon Over Miami (1941), and Three Little Girls in Blue (1946). Bolton's play was also made into a Broadway stage musical, Walk With Music (1940).

In the novel, American chicken farmer Teresa "Terry" Trent spends her vacation with her sisters in the French towns of St. Rocque (introduced in Hot Water) and Roville, and falls in love with a French writer.

The title of the novel stems from the expression french leave – to leave without saying goodbye to one's host or hostess.

== Plot ==
The Trent sisters, Teresa ("Terry"), Josephine ("Jo"), and Kate, run a farm with hens and bees in the village of Bensonburg in Long Island. Henry Weems, who wants to marry Jo, works for a legal firm that has managed the sale of a play written by the sisters' late father for television, and each girl receives a large payment. Jo wants to go to St. Rocque for the Festival and to marry a millionaire, whereas Teresa, the youngest sister, wants to have fun in Roville and then return to farming. Jo and Teresa agree to pool their money and buy one set of nice clothes, with one girl acting as the rich Miss Trent and the other as Fellowes, Miss Trent's personal maid, for a month, and then vice versa. Kate, the oldest sister, disapproves of them squandering their money but accompanies them as an austere chaperone.

Nicolas Jules St Xavier Auguste, Marquis de Maufringneuse et Valerie-Moberanne ("Old Nick") has a minor civil service job in Paris. Nick is a widower by his first wife and divorced his second wife, both American. He is well-mannered but lazy and fired by his employer, Monsieur de La Hourmerie, though he inadvertently takes away a dossier with him. Nick had a son with his first wife named Jefferson "Jeff" Auguste, Comte d'Escrignon, a writer who was in the Maquis. Old Nick gets money from his son and goes to St. Rocque. Jeff follows when Nick needs more money after being tricked by his friend Prince Blamont-Chevry. Jo, who will be the rich Miss Trent first, hopes to court a rich American there, Chester Todd. Chester's wealthy friend Frederick "Freddie" Carpenter hides after his trousers are stolen. Terry gets Old Nick to assist him, and Nick is rewarded with a cruise on Carpenter's yacht to Roville. On the yacht will also be Chester's aunt, Hermione Pegler (Old Nick's ex-wife), and Chester's sister, Mavis Todd. Jo learns that Chester is married and goes home to marry Henry, while Terry and Kate head to Rovillle.

Old Nick, believing Terry is rich, introduces her to Jeff, and they soon fall in love. Mrs. Pegler has holdings in the sparkling water company controlled by Freddie and the rival company controlled by Mavis and Chester. She encourages a marriage between Mavis and Freddie to promote a merger between the companies that would increase the value of her holdings. Fearing that Old Nick will try to pair Jeff with Mavis and that Terry will steal Freddie, Mrs. Pegler pays Pierre Alexandre Boissonade, the brusque and unpleasant Commissaire of Police at Roville, to search Terry's room for anything incriminating. M. de La Hourmerie finds Old Nick and demands the missing dossier. Kate learns from him that Nick and Jeff have little money, and she tells Nick that Terry also has little money, which turns Nick against a match between Jeff and Terry. Jeff goes to Paris to see publisher J. Russell Clutterbuck, who is also a customer of the Trent farm. Terry is warned by Boissonade's sympathetic subordinate about the search, so she asks Freddie, a former American football player, to guard her room. He punches Boissonade, who escapes. Kate, Old Nick, and others discover Freddie with Terry in her room. Nick tells Freddie he must marry Terry and telephones a newspaper to announce the engagement.

Terry refuses to marry Freddie, and Freddie, who loves Mavis, gets engaged to her, to Mrs. Pegler's delight. Terry reconsiders marrying Freddie when she mistakenly thinks Jeff has gone to Paris to leave her, and similarly Jeff is misled by the newspaper announcement, but they eventually reconcile. Old Nick steals money from Mrs. Pegler under the pretense of borrowing it. Chester recognizes Terry as Jo's maid Fellowes, and Mrs. Pegler believes Terry stole the money. Boissonade confronts Terry, but Clutterbuck defends her. Nick confesses to Clutterbuck that he stole the money; Nick flees and Clutterbuck tells Boissonade the truth. Boissonade does not believe him, so Clutterbuck knocks him out, allowing Terry and Jeff to escape to America. Clutterbuck is left to explain everything to Kate. Nine months later, Terry sees Clutterbuck in New York. Jeff's novel has been turned into a successful play by Sam Behrman. Old Nick married a French cook, and Clutterbuck got him the job of head waiter at a New York restaurant, where Nick is the boss of his old friend Prince Blamont-Chevry.

== Background ==
The plot of French Leave had been used in a play by Guy Bolton (Three Blind Mice, 1938) for which Bolton had already sold the rights to MGM, and which had been filmed as Three Blind Mice (1938), Moon Over Miami (1941) and Three Little Girls in Blue (1946). "Do we coyly reveal the fact that your play on which the book was founded has already been made into a picture three times?" Wodehouse wrote to him in 1962. "Secrecy and silence, I think, don't you? All moneys will be paid to me as apparently the sole author and I will slip you yours – in pounds, if you are still in England when the advance comes in, or in dollars if you are over here."

The titles of some of the French characters in the novel, the Marquis de Maufringneuse et Valerie-Moberanne, the Comte d'Escrignon and Prince Blamont-Chevry, are similar to those of some recurring characters in Honoré de Balzac's La Comédie humaine: the Duchesse de Maufrigneuse, the Marquis d'Esgrignon and the Princesse de Blamont-Chauvry. A Comtesse de Valérie-Moberanne made a fleeting appearance in The Triumphs of Eugène Valmont, by Robert Barr. The elusive dossier Quibolle is from Messieurs les ronds-de-cuir by Georges Courteline.

== Publication history ==
A condensed version of the story was published in the Canadian magazine Star Weekly on 24 September 1955. It was also serialised in the London magazine John Bull from 12 November 1955 to 3 December 1955 in four parts, with illustrations by Edwin Phillips.

The first UK edition dust wrapper was illustrated by Sax, who also drew ten illustrations for the 1957 Popular Book Club edition (UK). The dust jacket of the first US edition was designed by Robert Shore.

The 1974 UK edition of the book reissued by Barrie & Jenkins included a new preface by Wodehouse.
