= Charlie Wild, Private Detective (radio program) =

American radio detective series (1950–1951)

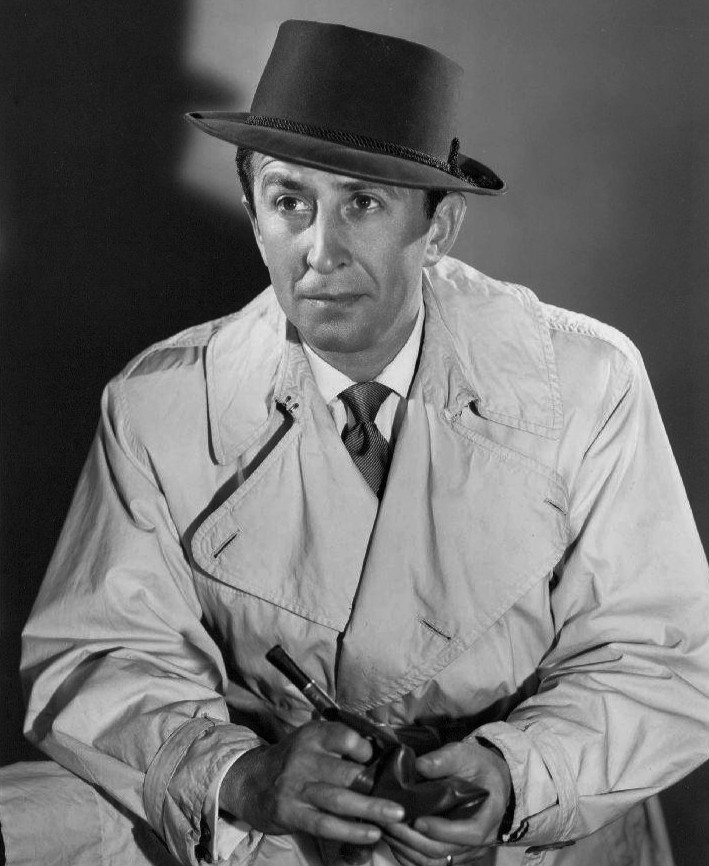
- George Petrie in character as Charlie Wild
- Genre: Detective mystery drama
- Running time: 30 minutes
- Country of origin: United States
- Language: English
- Syndicates: NBC (1950); CBS (1951)
- TV adaptations: Charlie Wild, Private Detective
- Starring: George Petrie (1950); Kevin O'Morrison (early 1951); John McQuade (later 1951)
- Announcer: William Rogers
- Written by: Peter Barry
- Directed by: Carlo D'Angelo; Stanley Niss
- Produced by: Edwin Marshall; Lawrence White
- Original release: September 24, 1950 – July 1, 1951
- Sponsored by: Wildroot Cream-Oil

Charlie Wild, Private Detective is an American old-time radio detective mystery drama. It was broadcast on NBC September 24, 1950 - December 17, 1950, and on CBS January 7, 1951 - July 1, 1951. The episodes broadcast on CBS were also carried on six stations of the Alaska Broadcasting System.

== Origin ==
Charlie Wild, Private Detective replaced The Adventures of Sam Spade on the air. The change followed the listing of Sam Spade's star (Howard Duff) and creator (Dashiell Hammett) in the anti-Communist tract Red Channels.

Radio historian John Dunning wrote that the association of the two names with Communist activities was "making Spade sponsor Wildroot Cream-Oil increasingly unhappy." However, representatives of both the Wildroot company and the advertising agency that had the account denied that the cancellation of Sam Spade was related to the stir caused by Red Channels. They said that the sponsor wanted a program with a lower budget on radio so that the money saved could be used for television.

In either case, the last Spade episode aired on September 17, 1950, and the first Wild episode was heard on September 24, 1950. Duff provided a transition between the two programs by appearing as Spade on the first episode of the new series with what Dunning called "a vocal telegram, wishing the new hero well."

== Premise ==
Private investigator Charlie Wild had his headquarters in New York City. Leon Morse wrote in a review in the trade publication Billboard that the program had "tough talk, vivid similies, a hard-guy hero and fantastic descriptions of females."

== Personnel ==
George Petrie played Wild in the NBC episodes. Kevin O'Morrison replaced Petrie when the program went to CBS, and John McQuade replaced O'Morrison on March 25, 1951. Peter Hobbs portrayed McCoy, Wild's assistant.

The producers were Edwin Marshall and Lawrence White; the directors, Carlo D'Angelo and Stanley Niss; the writer, Peter Barry; the announcer, William Rogers; and the musical director, Charles Sherrill.
