= Snowed Under (disambiguation) =

Snowed Under is a 1936 American romantic comedy film.

It may also refer to:

- "Snowed Under", a song on the B-side of a limited edition CD containing "Somewhere Only We Know" by Keane
- "Snowed Under", a 2006 Christmas song by Welsh folk singer Mary Hopkin
