= Mark Coggins =

American novelist

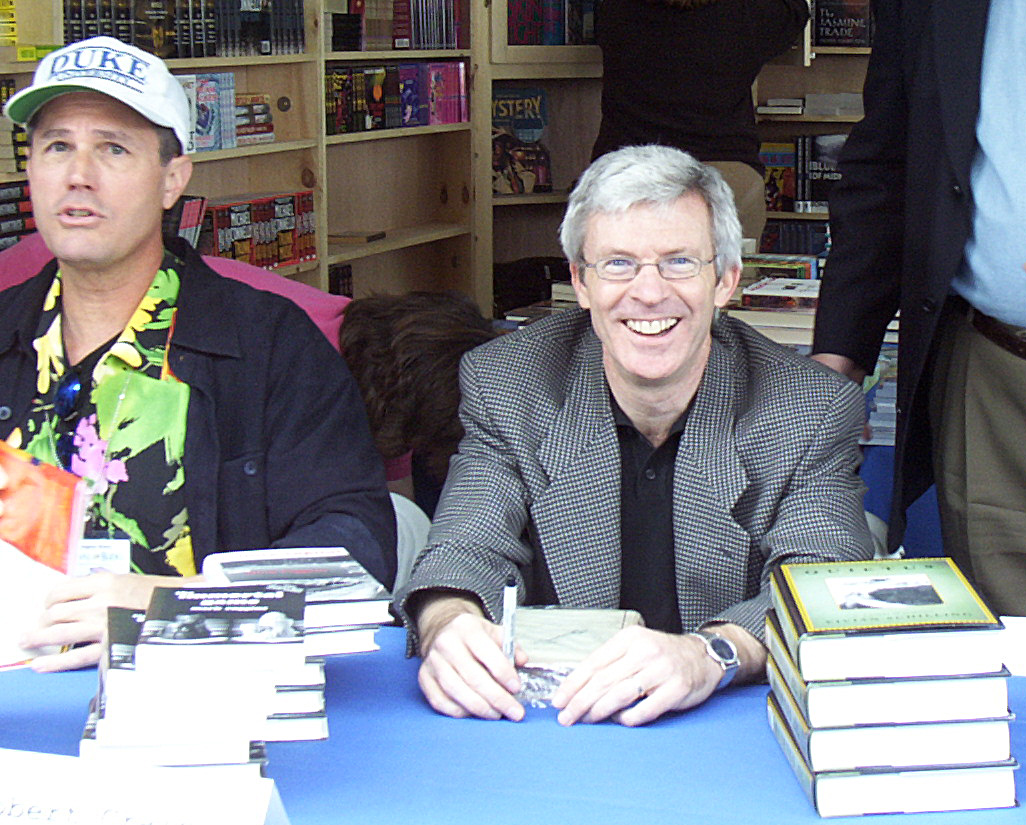
- Robert Crais and Mark Coggins
- Born: 1957 (age 68–69); New Mexico, United States
- Citizenship: United States
- Education: Stanford University (MS)
- Occupations: Author, photographer
- Writing career
- Language: English
- Genre: crime fiction
- Notable works: The Immortal Game; The Big Wake-Up
- Notable awards: Independent Publisher Book Awards; 2010 The Big Wake-Up

Mark Coggins (born 1957) is the Choctaw and American author of a series of novels featuring San Francisco private eye August Riordan. He is also a photographer.

== Biography ==
Coggins was born in New Mexico in 1957 and attended Stanford University, where he earned an undergraduate degree in International Relations, a masters in Computer Science and was elected to the Phi Beta Kappa Society. He is an enrolled member of the Choctaw Nation.

While at Stanford, Coggins took creative writing classes with Tobias Wolff and Ron Hansen and wrote the first short story featuring August Riordan in a class for Hansen. This was published in 1986 in The New Black Mask, a revival of the famous Black Mask pulp magazine that launched the careers of Dashiell Hammett and Raymond Chandler.

Coggins has worked in the Silicon Valley for such companies as Hewlett Packard and Netscape and although Riordan as a character is something of a technophobe, Coggins' novels often explore high technology themes and Silicon Valley culture.

== Career ==
Coggins' first book, The Immortal Game, dealt with the theft of chess-playing software similar to that run on Deep Blue and was nominated for the Shamus Award and the Barry Award. Runoff described a fictional mayoral election in San Francisco where the results were altered by individuals who hacked the city's electronic voting machines. The Big Wake-Up envisioned an altered version of the bizarre history of the peripatetic remains of Argentina's most famous first lady, Eva Perón, and won the gold medal in the Independent Publisher Book Awards in the Mystery/Suspense/Thriller category.

Prom Night and Other Man-made Disasters was somewhat of a departure. A collection of humorous essays describing episodes in his life from school, career, and relationships, it features a number of anecdotes from his childhood in Phoenix, Arizona, including the title essay, "Prom Night," the improbable story of how shy and socially-awkward Coggins brought the homecoming queen of Central High School to the senior prom.

In 2025, when the Black Mask version of The Maltese Falcon entered the public domain, Coggins published two Sam Spade stories in Eclectica Magazine that continued the story from the novel's conclusion. These were later reprinted in a 2026 edition of the novel as a coda along with black and white photographs of Falcon locations in San Francisco taken by Coggins.

== Works ==
=== Novels ===
- The Immortal Game (1999). ISBN 978-0918395177
- Vulture Capital (2002). ISBN 978-0918395214
- Candy From Strangers (2006). ISBN 978-1932557169
- Runoff (2007). ISBN 978-1932557534
- The Big Wake-Up (2009). ISBN 978-1606480557
- No Hard Feelings (2015). ISBN 978-1937495909
- The Dead Beat Scroll (2019). ISBN 978-1643960319
- Geisha Confidential (2024). ISBN 978-1643963570
- The Maltese Falcon Illustrated, with a Coda by Mark Coggins (2026). ISBN 978-0918395429

=== Non-fiction ===
- Prom Night and Other Man-made Disasters (2012). ISBN 978-0982948453

=== Photography Monographs ===
- Street Stories (2021). ISBN 978-0918395375
