= Hot Water =

Hot Water may refer to:

- Hot Water (novel), a 1932 novel by P.G. Wodehouse
- Hot Water (album), an album by Jimmy Buffett
- "Hot Water" (song), a 1984 song by Level 42
- "Hot Water", a 2014 song by King Gizzard & the Lizard Wizard, see I'm in Your Mind Fuzz
- Hot Water (1924 film), feature film starring silent comedian Harold Lloyd
- Hot Water (1937 film), 55-min American comedy directed by Frank R. Strayer
- Hot Water, a 1978 film directed by Su Friedrich
- Hot Water (2026 film), an American drama film
- "Hot Water" (American Dad!), a 2011 episode of American Dad!
