= George Petrie (actor) =

American actor (1912–97)

George O. Petrie
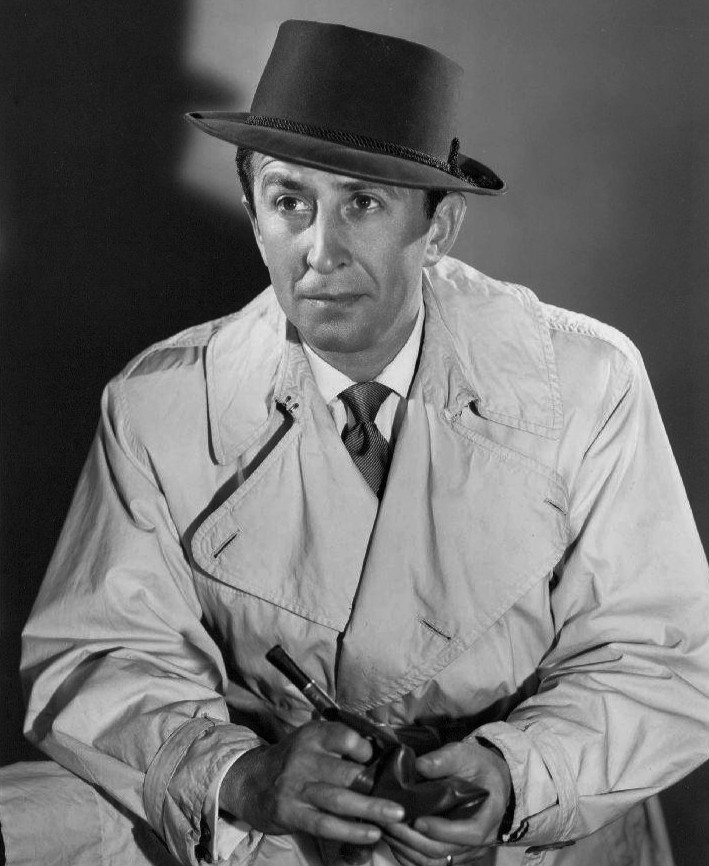
- Petrie as the star of Charlie Wild, Private Detective on radio, 1950
- Born: George O. Petrie; November 16, 1912; New Haven, Connecticut, U.S.
- Died: November 16, 1997 (aged 85); Los Angeles, California, U.S.
- Resting place: Forest Lawn Memorial Park (Hollywood Hills)
- Education: University of Southern California
- Occupation: Actor
- Years active: 1944–1996
- Spouse: Patricia Pope
- Children: 2

George O. Petrie (November 16, 1912 – November 16, 1997) was an American radio and television actor.

== Early years ==
Petrie was born on November 16, 1912, in New Haven, Connecticut. He acted in student productions at New Haven High School and graduated from the University of Southern California in 1934 and served in the Army during World War II, joining in 1942.

== Stage ==
Petrie's career began on stage, working with the Federal Theatre Project in Bridgeport, Hartford, and New Haven. In 1938 he portrayed attorney George Simon in a Federal Theatre Project production of Counsellor-At-Law. His Broadway credits include The Girl from Wyoming (1938), Jeremiah (1939), The Night Before Christmas (1941), Mr. Big (1941), Cafe Crown (1942), Army Play-by Play (1943), Winged Victory (1943), and Brighten the Corner (1945).

In 1974 Petrie returned to the stage after a 12-year absence when he co-starred in Stag at Bay, produced by the Florida State University School of Theater.

== Radio ==
Petrie started in radio drama, including playing the title roles in Charlie Wild, Private Detective and in The Adventures of the Falcon. He played Bill Grant in Call the Police and appeared on programs such as the syndicated horror program Murder at Midnight in 1947 and the recurring role of DA Markham in the syndicated Philo Vance radio series from 1948 to 1950.

== Film ==
Petrie's film credits include At Sword's Point (1952), Baby Boom (1987), and Planes, Trains and Automobiles (1987).

== Television ==
Petrie portrayed prosecuting attorney Pete Quinn on The Edge of Night for more than a decade. On The Honeymooners, he had recurring character roles throughout the series. He played Eddie Haskell's father in season 6 of Leave it to Beaver. He appeared on the prime-time soap opera Dallas and the 1996 sequel TV movie Dallas: J.R. Returns, in the recurring role of Ewing family attorney Harv Smithfield.

Other television credits include: Rawhide; 77 Sunset Strip; Alfred Hitchcock Presents; The Twilight Zone; The Andy Griffith Show; Perry Mason; Dr. Kildare; Bonanza; The Addams Family; The Munsters; The Wild Wild West; Hawaii Five-O; Little House on the Prairie; Ironside; Combat!; Maude; Gunsmoke; The Paper Chase; Three's Company; Cagney & Lacey; Dynasty; Quincy, M.E.; Knight Rider; St. Elsewhere; Wiseguy; Night Court; Gomer Pyle, USMC; Mad About You; L.A. Law and Who's the Boss.

== Personal life and death ==
Petrie married actress Patty Pope, and they had two children.He died of lymphoma on his 85th birthday in Los Angeles.

== Filmography ==
Year	Title	Role	Notes
1944	Winged Victory	Barker	
1947	Boomerang	Harry O'Shea, Public Defender	Uncredited
1950	Swiss Tour	Sidney	
1952	At Sword's Point	Chalais	
1962	Gypsy	George	
1963	Hud	Joe Scanlon	
1963	Wall of Noise	Mr. Tom Harrington	
1964	Dead Ringer	Eddie Krauss	Uncredited
1964	He Rides Tall	Crowley	
1968	What's So Bad About Feeling Good?	Bolton	Uncredited
1976	Raid on Entebbe	Chaim Zadok	TV movie
1977	Telefon	Hotel Desk Clerk	
1978	The Other Side of the Mountain Part 2	Doctor in Los Angeles	
1981	Goldie and the Boxer Go to Hollywood	Frank	TV movie
1983	Wavelength	Dr. Savianno	
1987	Baby Boom	Everett Sloane	
1987	Planes, Trains and Automobiles	Martin	
1992	Folks!	Sammy	

== Television ==
Year	Title	Role	Notes
1961	Rawhide	Deputy	Season 4 Episode 4: "Judgment at Hondo Seco"
1963	The Alfred Hitchcock Hour	Detective Rogers	Season 1 Episode 26: "An Out for Oscar"
1963	The Alfred Hitchcock Hour	Henry	Season 2 Episode 11: "How to Get Rid of Your Wife"
1970	Hawaii Five-O	Austin Summers	Season 2 Episode 20: "Cry, Lie"
1982	Dynasty	Chairman Willard Horton	Season 2 Episode 13: "The Hearing"
1984	Three's Company	Mr. Williams	Season 8 Episode 15: "Look What I Found"
1990	Who's the Boss?	Grandpa Romano	Season 6 Episode 20: "I Dream of Genealogy"
