= Genevieve Tobin =

American actress (1901–1995)

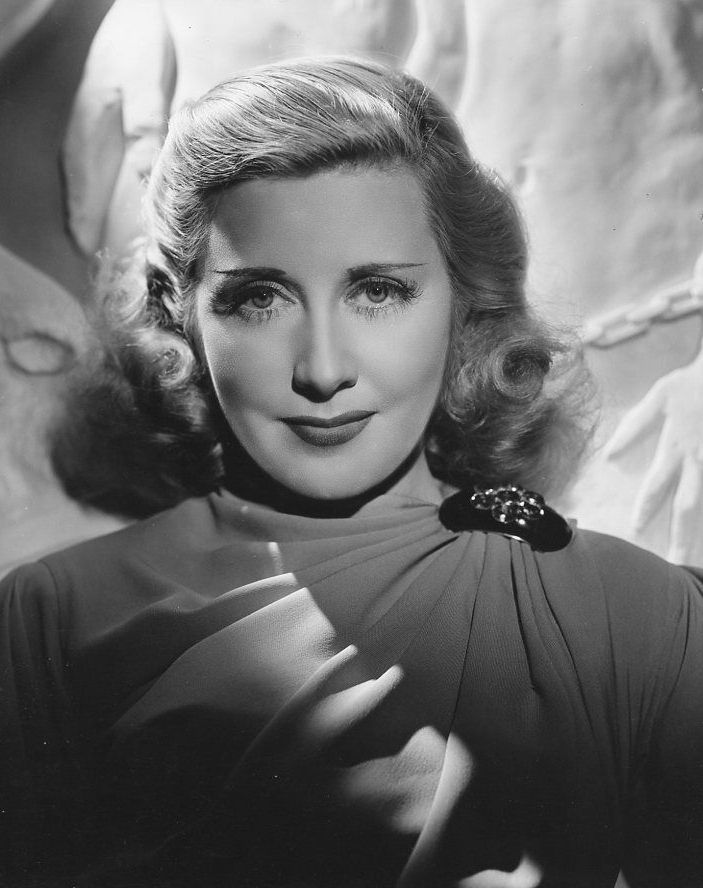
- Portrait of Tobin circa late 1930s
- Born: November 29, 1901; New York City, New York, U.S.
- Died: July 31, 1995 (aged 93)
- Occupation: Actress
- Years active: 1910–1940
- Spouse: William Keighley (m. 1938; died 1984)

Genevieve Tobin (November 29, 1901 – July 31, 1995) was an American actress.

== Early years ==
Tobin was born in New York City on November 29, 1901, and was educated in Paris.

== Career ==
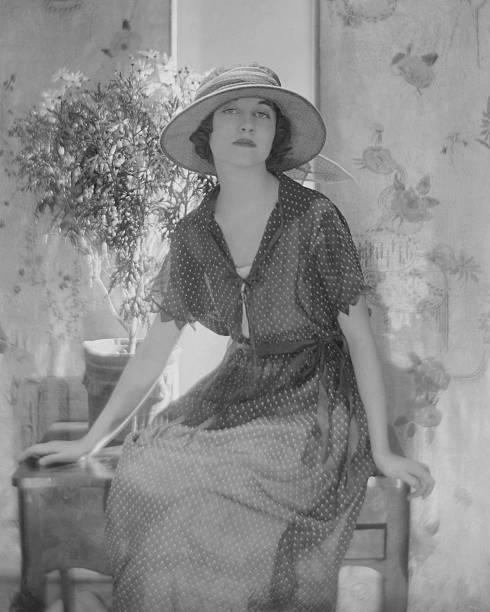
Genevieve Tobin photographed in Vogue, April 15, 1921, edition.

Tobin's stage debut came in 1912 in Disraeli. She appeared in a few films as a child and formed a double act with her sister Vivian. Their brother, George, also had a brief acting career. Following her education in Paris and New York, Tobin concentrated on a stage career in New York.

Although she was seen most often in comedies, she also played the role of Cordelia in a Broadway production of King Lear in 1923. Popular with audiences, she was often praised by critics for her appearance and style rather than for her talent, but in 1929, she achieved a significant success in the play Fifty Million Frenchmen. She introduced and popularized the Cole Porter song "You Do Something to Me", and the success of the role led her back to Hollywood, where she performed regularly in comedy films from the early 1930s.

She played supporting roles opposite such performers as Jeanette MacDonald, Nelson Eddy, Cary Grant, Barbara Stanwyck, Claudette Colbert, Joan Blondell, and Kay Francis, but occasionally played starring roles, in films such as Golden Harvest (1933) and Easy to Love (1934). She played secretary Della Street to Warren William's Perry Mason in The Case of the Lucky Legs (1935). One of her performances was as the bored wife of a wealthy businessman in the drama The Petrified Forest (1936), starring Leslie Howard, Bette Davis, and Humphrey Bogart.

She married director William Keighley in 1938 and made only a few more films; her final film before retirement was No Time for Comedy (1940), with James Stewart and Rosalind Russell.

She remained married to Keighley until his death in 1984.

== Partial filmography ==
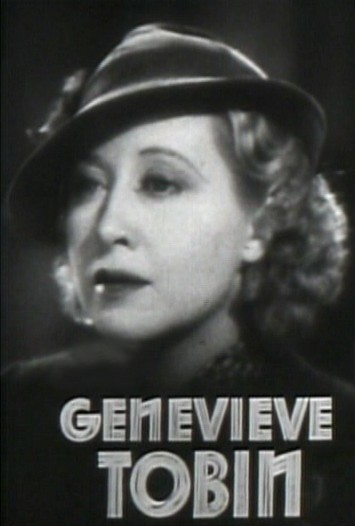
Tobin in the trailer for The Petrified Forest (1936)

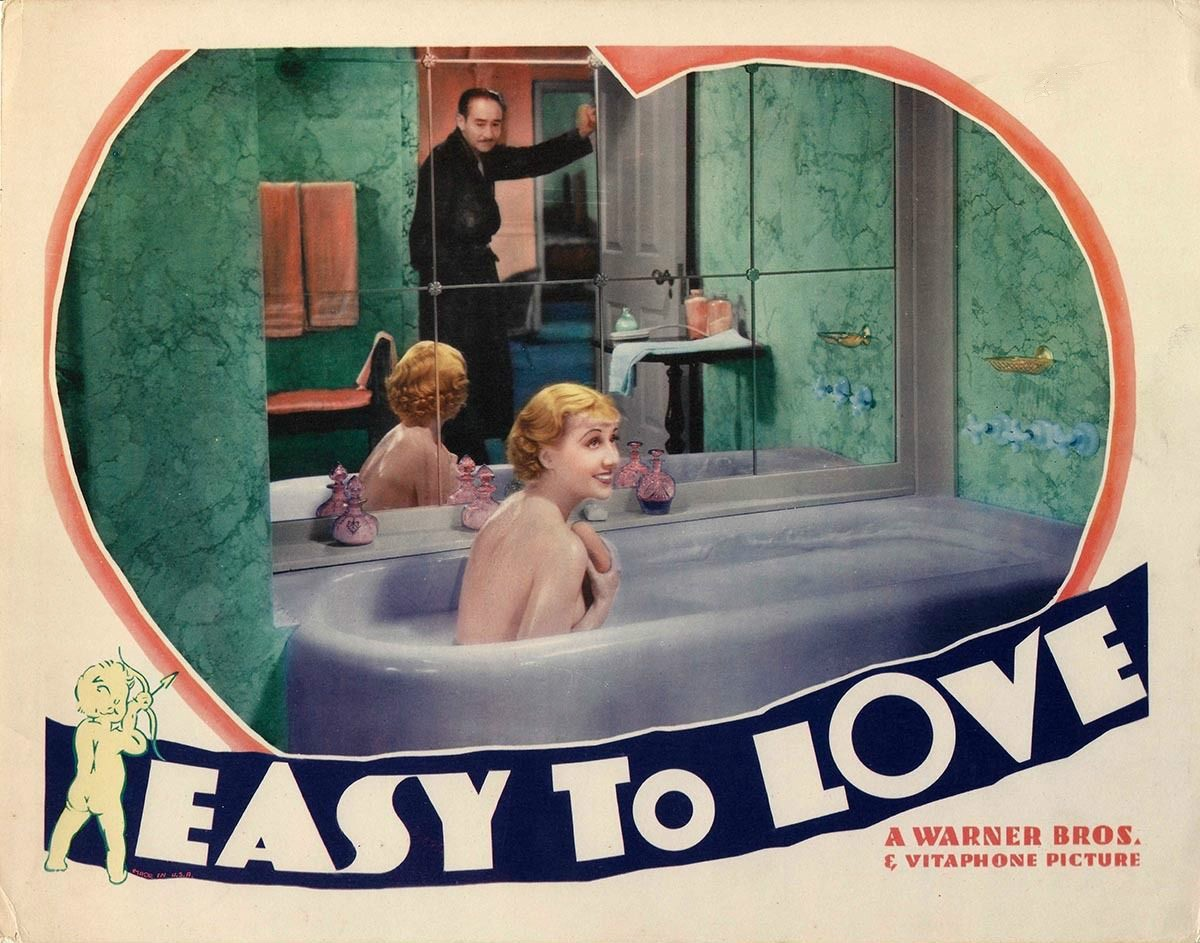
Tobin on a lobby card for her film Easy to Love (1934)

- Uncle Tom's Cabin (1910, short) - Eva
- The Country Cousin (1919) - Eleanor Howitt
- No Mother to Guide Her (1923) - Mary Boyd
- Free Love (1930) - Mary
- A Lady Surrenders (1930) - Hope Ferrier
- Seed (1931) - Myra Deane
- The Gay Diplomat (1931) - Countess Diana Dorchy
- One Hour with You (1932) - Mitzi Olivier
- The Cohens and Kellys in Hollywood (1932) - Herself
- Hollywood Speaks (1932) - Gertie Smith / Greta Swan
- Perfect Understanding (1933) - Kitty Drayton
- Pleasure Cruise (1933) - Shirley Poole
- Infernal Machine (1933) - Elinor Green
- The Wrecker (1933) - Mary Regan
- Goodbye Again (1933) - Julie Wilson
- Golden Harvest (1933) - Cynthia Flint
- I Loved a Woman (1933) - Martha Lane
- Easy to Love (1934) - Carol
- Dark Hazard (1934) - Marge Mayhew Turner
- The Ninth Guest (1934) - Jean Trent
- Success at Any Price (1934) - Agnes
- Uncertain Lady (1934) - Doris Crane
- Kiss and Make-Up (1934) - Eve Caron
- By Your Leave (1934) - Ellen Smith
- The Woman in Red (1935) - Mrs. 'Nicko' Nicholas
- Here's to Romance (1935) - Kathleen Gerard
- The Goose and the Gander (1935) - Betty
- The Case of the Lucky Legs (1935) - Della Street
- Broadway Hostess (1935) - Iris
- The Petrified Forest (1936) - Mrs. Chisholm
- Snowed Under (1936) - Alice Merritt
- The Man in the Mirror (1936) - Helen
- The Great Gambini (1937) - Nancy Randall
- The Call of the Ring (1937) - Pauline Corbin
- Kate Plus Ten (1938) - Kate Westhanger
- Dramatic School (1938) - Gina Bertier
- Zaza (1939) - Florianne
- Yes, My Darling Daughter (1939) - Connie Nevins
- Our Neighbors - The Carters (1939) - Gloria Hastings
- No Time for Comedy (1940) - Amanda Swift
