= Danger, Dr. Danfield =

American radio crime drama (1946–1947)

- Genre: Crime drama
- Running time: 30 minutes
- Country of origin: United States
- Language: English
- Syndicates: ABC
- Starring: Steve Dunne; JoAnne Johnson
- Written by: Ralph Wilkinson
- Produced by: Wally Ramsey
- Original release: August 18, 1946 – April 13, 1947
- Sponsored by: Knox Company

Danger, Dr. Danfield is an American old-time radio crime drama. It was broadcast on ABC from August 18, 1946, to April 13, 1947, and was syndicated for several years thereafter.

== Premise ==
The title character was Dr. Daniel Danfield, a criminal psychologist. Each episode featured his dictation of a summary of a case to his secretary, Rusty Fairfax. Dramatic sequences were interspersed with the narration. Danfield's cases often came in response to requests for help from law enforcement agencies. He frequently met with criminals to analyze them and their behavior. The publication Shows of Tomorrow, published by Radio Daily, described the program as having "emphasis on solution of crime rather than on murder."

The 30-minute transcribed program was produced by Teleways Radio Productions.

== Personnel ==
Steve Dunne played Dr. Danfield, and JoAnne Johnson played Rusty Fairfax. Herb Butterfield played Captain Otis, a homicide detective, and Jay Novello played the doctor's chauffeur. Wally Ramsey was the producer, and Ralph Wilkinson was the writer.

== See also ==
- Crime Doctor
- The Crime Files of Flamond
