= Betty Mandeville =

American radio director and producer (1910 or 1911 - 2001)

Betty Mandeville (1910 or 1911 - June 14, 2001) was one of the first female producers and directors in American network radio. She worked in television later in her career.

== Early years ==
Mandeville was born in Mora, Minnesota, the daughter of Mr. and Mrs. William Mandeville, and raised in Minneapolis, Minnesota. When she was a student at the elementary school in Lake Harriet, Minnesota, she acted in plays that she staged herself, raising money for the Red Cross in the process. When she was 12 years old, she provided cues to actors at the Bainbridge Theater. While a student at West High School she performed with the Bainbridge Players acting troupe. After studying two years at the University of Minnesota, she moved to New York, where she graduated from the American Academy of Dramatic Arts.

== Career ==
Mandeville was unable to find work on Broadway during the Great Depression, so she returned to Minnesota and acted in some locally produced plays. When she returned to New York, she began working in radio. She started in that medium as a production assistant on Fred Allen's and Sigmund Romberg's programs, among others. She also worked in radio production for some advertising agencies.

In the early 1940s Mandeville was casting director on the radio programs Crime Doctor and Johnny Presents. She hired actors "based on looks as well as talent" because of her awareness that television would need actors in the near future. When she began working for the Biow Company, she became involved with production of The FBI in Peace and War. In 1948, she became producer and director of that program, a position that fit with her long-time interest in stories of mystery and adventure.

In television, Mandeville worked on The Price Is Right and was associate producer in charge of casting for Password, booking the stars who participated on that game show.

== Blue Ridge Radio Players ==
Mandeville and her husband, Hank Booraem, created the Blue Ridge Radio Players in Hendersonville, North Carolina, in 1991. That group recorded dramatic programs from old-time radio era and made them available to visually impaired people. Additionally, some radio stations broadcast the programs. The group primarily worked in a recording studio, but on April 23, 1992, the Players presented their first on-stage production at East Henderson High School. In 1993, Mandeville and Booraem created a recording studio in their basement to avoid having to reserve time in commercial studios. They used a computer and a fax machine to "keep the business end of things going" and supplemented dialog in programs with recorded sound effects and music. Beth Jones, who was manager of South Carolina Educational Radio in 1993, said: "The Blue Ridge Radio Player tapes sound wonderful. They are professionally produced, and our listeners, from the calls I receive, would like to hear many, many more." The group formed a second troupe in Raleigh, North Carolina.

== Personal life and death ==
Mandeville married television producer George F. McGarrett on July 2, 1950, in Greenwich, Connecticut. They had a daughter, Maureen. In 1989, she married Booraem, who had retired after a career as a radio and television director and executive. She died of cancer on June 14, 2001, at the Elizabeth House in Hendersonville, aged 90. A memorial service for her occurred on June 23, 2001, at First United Methodist Church in Hendersonville.
