= No Time for Comedy =

- Theatrical release poster
- Directed by: William Keighley
- Screenplay by: Julius J. Epstein; Philip G. Epstein
- Based on: No Time for Comedy; 1939 play by S. N. Behrman
- Produced by: Jack L. Warner
- Starring: James Stewart; Rosalind Russell; Genevieve Tobin; Charlie Ruggles; Allyn Joslyn; Clarence Kolb; Louise Beavers
- Cinematography: Ernest Haller
- Edited by: Owen Marks
- Music by: Heinz Roemheld
- Distributed by: Warner Bros. Pictures
- Release date: September 14, 1940
- Running time: 93 minutes
- Country: United States
- Language: English

No Time for Comedy is a 1940 American comedy-drama film based on the play of the same name by S. N. Behrman, starring James Stewart, Rosalind Russell, Genevieve Tobin and Charlie Ruggles.

== Plot ==
Gaylord Esterbrook, a reporter from Redfield, Minnesota (pop. 786, including livestock), writes a play about Park Avenue high society, even though he has never been to New York City. The play is being staged, but needs rewriting, so the producers bring Gaylord to New York. He meets the leading lady, Linda Paige, who initially mistakes him for an usher. The producer eventually loses faith in the play, but Linda persuades the other actors to continue on a cooperative basis. It becomes a success, and Gaylord and Linda get married. Gaylord proceeds to have four hits in four years, all starring Linda.

After his most recent hit, Gaylord meets Amanda Swift at a party. She feels that his talents are being wasted writing comedies. At her urging, he writes a tragedy about immortality called The Way of the World. The play has no part for Linda. Gaylord eventually decides to divorce Linda and marry Amanda. Linda then decides to marry Amanda's husband, Philo.

The Way of the World is a flop, with audiences laughing at unintentionally funny lines, prompting Amanda to drop Gaylord. However, Linda supports Gaylord in his time of need and they reconcile. She gets the idea for a comedy about smug, contemptible, callous stuffed shirts who think that dictators are inevitable and the average man is bloodthirsty and contemptible. Gaylord and Linda decide to start over, and even act out their initial meeting: Gaylord offers to buy Linda cigarettes as if he were an usher.

== Cast ==
- James Stewart as Gaylord Esterbrook
- Rosalind Russell as Linda Paige Esterbrook
- Genevieve Tobin as Amanda Swift
- Charlie Ruggles as Philo Swift
- Allyn Joslyn as Morgan Carrell
- Clarence Kolb as Richard Benson
- Louise Beavers as Clementine
- Robert Greig as Robert
- J. M. Kerrigan as Jim
- Lawrence Grossmith as Frank
- Frank Faylen as Cab Driver

== Stage play ==
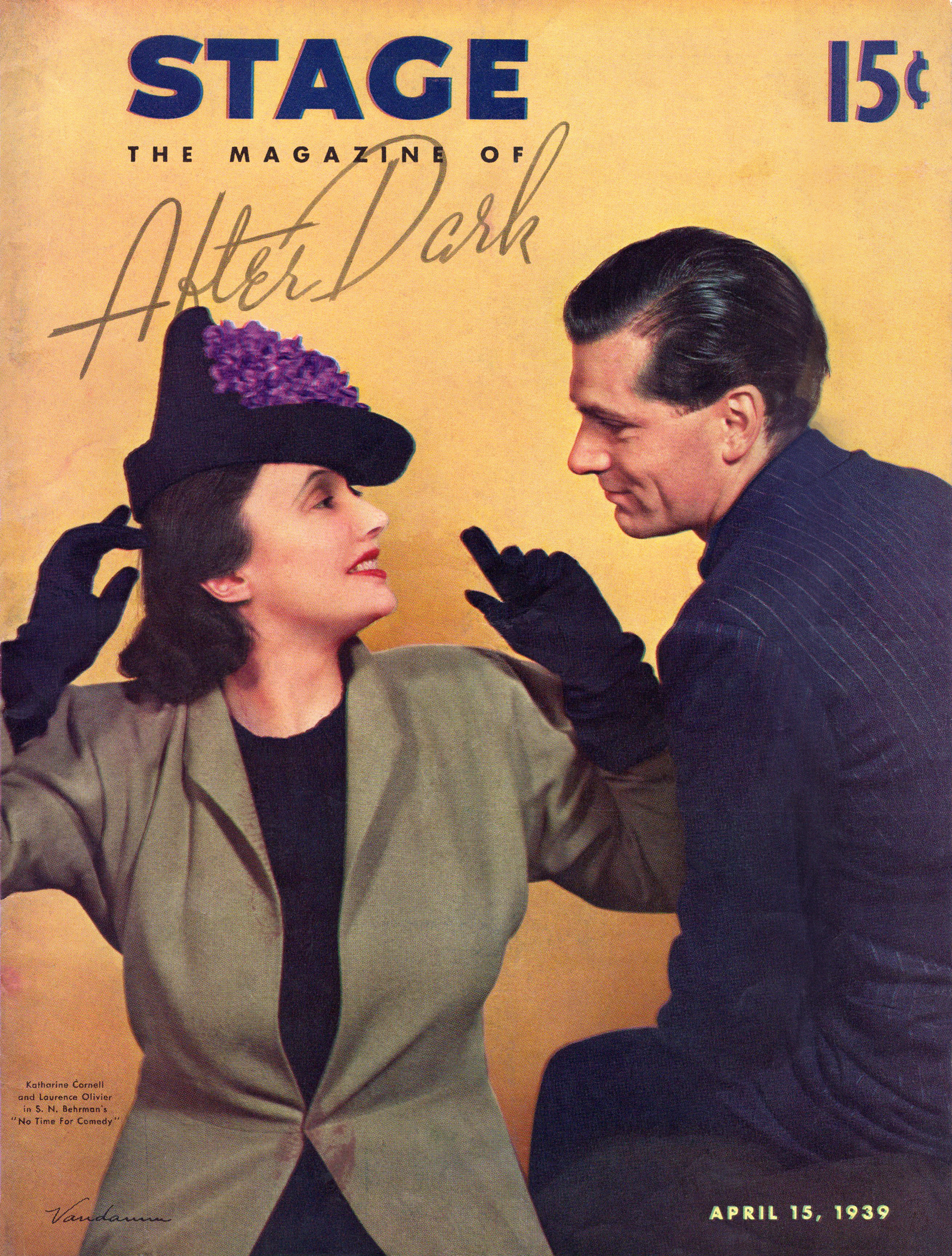
Katharine Cornell and Laurence Olivier in the Broadway production of No Time for Comedy, on the cover of Stage magazine (April 15, 1939)

S.N. Behrman's play opened on Broadway at the Ethel Barrymore Theatre on April 17, 1939, running for 179 performances. The cast included Laurence Olivier as Gaylord Esterbrook and Katharine Cornell as Linda Paige, and it was directed by Cornell's husband Guthrie McClintic.

Olivier starred in this play in New York while his lover Vivien Leigh was filming Gone with the Wind in Hollywood, causing Leigh stress due to their separation, and according to GWTW lore, influenced her portrayal as Scarlett O'Hara and according to her personal assistant at the time, hurry production so she could be reunited with him.

== Production ==
Julius Epstein later said "We had to make big changes" in adapting the play which "was just talk, talk, talk—no action really, no situations. It was very good talk, but we had to do a lot of changing on that."

== Radio adaptations ==
Date	Program	Stars
February 9, 1941	Gulf Screen Guild Theatre	Norma Shearer, Mary Astor, Walter Abel, Hattie McDaniel
June 12, 1942	Philip Morris Playhouse	Melvyn Douglas
November 20, 1945	Theater of Romance	
December 10, 1946	Hollywood Players	Gregory Peck
March 9, 1947	Theatre Guild on the Air	Florence Eldridge, Frances Fuller, Fredric March
October 18, 1953	Star Playhouse	Rex Harrison, Lilli Palmer
