= The FBI in Peace and War =

American radio crime drama (1944–1958)

- Genre: Crime drama
- Running time: 30 minutes
- Country of origin: United States
- Language(s): English
- Syndicates: CBS
- Starring: Martin Blaine; Donald Briggs
- Announcer: Andre Baruch; Hugh Holder; Dick Noel; Len Sterling; Warren Sweeney
- Created by: Frederick L. Collins
- Written by: Ed Adamson; Fred Collins; Jacques Finke; Louis Pelletier
- Directed by: Max Marcin; Betty Mandeville
- Produced by: Max Marcin; Betty Mandeville
- Original release: November 25, 1944 – September 28, 1958

The FBI in Peace and War was an American radio crime drama inspired by Frederick Lewis Collins' book of the same name.

== Overview ==
The idea for the show came from Louis Pelletier who wrote many of the scripts. Among the show's other writers were Jack Finke, Ed Adamson and Collins. It aired on CBS from November 25, 1944, to September 28, 1958, produced and directed by Max Marcin and Betty Mandeville. The show had a variety of sponsors over the years, including Lava Soap, Wildroot Cream-Oil, Lucky Strike, Nescafe and Wrigley's.

In 1955, it was the eighth most popular show on radio, as noted in Time.

Martin Blaine and Donald Briggs headed the cast.

Episodes included "The Marriage Mart" on December 16, 1944.

== Production ==
The theme was the March from Prokofiev's The Love for Three Oranges, arranged for small symphony orchestra by Amedeo De Filippi, with Vladimir Selinksy conducting. The music was accompanied by a chant of "L-A-V-A," in reference to the show's sponsor being Lava soap.

In November 1947 the program was moved from Fridays at 9:30 p.m. Eastern Time to Thursdays at 8 p.m. E. T. In the summer of 1948 it took an eight-week hiatus, replaced by The Doctor Says Murder.

== Listen to ==
- The FBI in Peace and War, radiolovers.com (archive.org)
- Episodes of The FBI in Peace and War, archive.org
