= Brown Holmes =

American screenwriter (1907–1974)

Brown Holmes (December 12, 1907, Toledo, Ohio – February 12, 1974, Los Angeles County, California) was an American screenwriter who worked for several major Hollywood studios in the 1930s and 1940s.

He was known as Kenneth Dewitt Holmes in his youth. Holmes' father, Robert Brown Holmes, was a newspaperman. Holmes was raised in California. He had two younger brothers, Richard and Bob. Holmes graduated from Hollywood High School.

Among Holmes' credits are several highly-profile prison films: I Am a Fugitive from a Chain Gang (1932), 20,000 Years in Sing Sing (1932) and its remake Castle on the Hudson (1940). The first two films had a "hyper-present protagonist", one who appears in nearly every scene, which was uncommon in the 1930s but became a more common style starting with World War II.

For the film, I am a Fugitive from a Chain Gang, Holmes wrote the 86-page treatment from the 12-page outline and worked with Sheridan Gibney on a temporary script before studio executive Darryl F. Zanuck's suggestions. Holmes and Gibney avoided showing all the brutality of the chain-gang by showing the reactions on the prisoner's faces and letting the audience use their imaginations. Holmes and Gibney had written a powerful ending with an unusual outcome for the time. Holmes had a public feud with writer Howard J. Green, who finalized the screenplay, over the billing. Variety reported in 1934 that Holmes would write the sequel to I Am a Fugitive from a Chain Gang, to star Paul Muni, but it was never filmed.

His work on the 1933 film Ladies They Talk About was not well received by a Variety reviewer. "In the adaptation Sidney Sutherland and Brown Holmes have tried to overcome basic plot weaknesses through comedy, and much of which is excellent. But writers or director have erred in the picture of prison life painted and also in other ways".

He wrote or co-wrote two adaptations of Dashiell Hammett's 1930 detective novel The Maltese Falcon: The Maltese Falcon (1931) and Satan Met a Lady (1936).

He was a screenwriter for the Perry Mason film The Case of the Lucky Legs (1935) as well as adding "'snappy' rhythm" dialog to the prior film in the series, The Case of the Curious Bride (1935). He received a critical review of his work on The Case of the Lucky Legs (1935). In a review for Oakland Tribune, Wood Soanes wrote, "It isn't the best part of the series, due in an apparent inability on the part of the adapters, Brown Holmes and Ben Markson, to get the story running along smoothly" A Variety reviewer also enjoyed the writing in the film. "Slick writing job also sets it up as pretty smart entertainment" and "toward the end, when the solution is approaching the action slows down considerably, only the dialog keeping the picture alive".

In 1936, Holmes faced two professional challenges. Zachary Zemby sued Holmes, George R. Bilson, Erwin Gelsey, and Warner Bros. for $2,990, accusing them of plagiarizing the film We're in the Money (1935) from Zemby's scenario Alimony and Nuts. Later that spring, Holmes and three other writers, William Wister Haines, Richard Macaulay, and Robert Andrews, were dismissed from Warner Bros. These four and 20 others had "signed a protest petition against what they termed discriminatory treatment in the matter of sneak previews". The Writers Guild became involved in the matter, releasing a statement in support of the writers and their desire to attend first screenings of the films in which they have been involved.

About the film Snowed Under (1936), Variety wrote, "Original story by Lawrence Saunders has been accorded intelligent treatment for screen by F. Hugh Herbert and Brown Holmes".

Later that year, Holmes worked for Universal Pictures. He cowrote Oh, Doctor (1937) with Harry Clark. A Variety review noted, "Smooth dialogue keeps this hokey picture from going completely corkscrew and it's sufficiently swift to please the fans in the multiple trade".

The Lady Fights Back (1937) was "adapted by Brown Holmes and Robert T. Shannon along conventional melodramatic lines," according to Variety.

About Three Blind Mice (1938), which was written with Lynn Sterling, Edwin Schallert of Los Angeles Times wrote, "Three Blind Mice moves with marked zip once its story really starts evolving. The dialogue is ingenious, and all due praise for that to the writers". It was remade three years later as the musical Moon Over Miami.

In 1938, Darryl F. Zanuck of 20th-Century Fox spoke to Variety about Holmes and other promising young writers, saying, "The foundation of production is in the writing department; the rest is architecture, which doesn't meant a thing unless the story stands up, and is strong and sound enough to support the structure".

Holmes left MGM in April 1939.

One of his final films was 1948's Leather Gloves. Variety wrote, "Okay scripting chore was turned in by Brown Holmes, story twists and dialog lifting it about level of ordinary prizefighting plotting".

Holmes married Janet Banks, secretary to Metro-Goldwyn-Mayer casting director Ben Piazza, in 1933.

== Partial filmography ==
- The Maltese Falcon (1931)
- Play Girl (1932)
- The Strange Love of Molly Louvain (1932)
- Street of Women (1932)
- I Am a Fugitive from a Chain Gang (1932)
- 20,000 Years in Sing Sing (1932)
- Ladies They Talk About (1933)
- The Avenger (1933)
- The Stranger's Return (1933)
- Dark Hazard (1934)
- Heat Lightning (1934)
- I Sell Anything (1934)
- While the Patient Slept (1935) (add. dialogue)
- The Florentine Dagger (1935) (add. dialogue)
- The Case of the Curious Bride (1935) (add. dialogue)
- We're in the Money (1935)
- The Case of the Lucky Legs (1935)
- Snowed Under (1936)
- Satan Met a Lady (1936)
- Oh, Doctor (1937)
- The Crime of Doctor Hallet (1938)
- Three Blind Mice (1938)
- Hollywood Cavalcade (1939) (story)
- Castle on the Hudson (1940)
- Moon Over Miami (1941)
- Shed No Tears (1948)
- Leather Gloves (1948)
