= Dark Hazard =

1934 film by Alfred E. Green

- Directed by: Alfred E. Green
- Written by: Ralph Block; Brown Holmes
- Based on: Dark Hazard; 1933 novel by W. R. Burnett
- Produced by: Hal B. Wallis; Jack L. Warner
- Starring: Edward G. Robinson
- Cinematography: Sol Polito
- Edited by: Herbert Levy
- Music by: Leo F. Forbstein
- Production company: First National Pictures
- Distributed by: Warner Bros. Pictures
- Release date: February 3, 1934
- Running time: 72 minutes; 8 reels
- Country: United States
- Language: English

Dark Hazard is 1934 pre-Code American drama film starring Edward G. Robinson and directed by Alfred E. Green. It is based on a novel by W. R. Burnett. It was produced by First National Pictures and released through Warner Bros. Pictures.

A copy is held at the Library of Congress and the Wisconsin Center for Film and Theatre Research. It has been preserved by Warner Bros. and was released on Region 1 DVD on November 18, 2014, as part of the "Forbidden Hollywood, Volume 8" collection. It also airs occasionally on Turner Classic Movies.

== Plot ==
Buck Turner is a compulsive gambler with a come-and-go knack for picking winners. After failing at a succession of regular jobs, he becomes involved with the sport of greyhound racing; "Dark Hazard" is the name of a particular dog he takes a fancy to.

== Cast ==
- Edward G. Robinson as Jim "Buck" Turner
- Genevieve Tobin as Marge Mayhew
- Glenda Farrell as Valerie "Val" Wilson
- Robert Barrat as Tex Willis
- Hobart Cavanaugh as George Mayhew
- Gordon Westcott as Joe
- Sidney Toler as John Bright
- "War Cry" as Dark Hazard
- George Meeker as Pres. Barrow
- Emma Dunn as Mrs. Mayhew
- Willard Robertson as Fallen
- William V. Mong as Mr. Plummer
- Henry B. Walthall as Schultz
