= Infernal Machine (film) =

1933 film

- Directed by: Marcel Varnel; Martin Santell
- Written by: Arthur Kober; Aben Kandel; Victor Jory
- Starring: Chester Morris; Genevieve Tobin
- Cinematography: George Schneiderman
- Edited by: Ralph Dixon
- Music by: Samuel Kaylin
- Production company: Fox Film Corporation
- Distributed by: Fox Film Corporation
- Release date: February 10, 1933
- Running time: 65 minutes
- Country: United States
- Language: English

Infernal Machine is a 1933 American pre-Code thriller film directed by Marcel Varnel and starring Chester Morris, Genevieve Tobin and Victor Jory. The film was based on a novel by Karl Sloboda. Released by Fox Film Corporation, the title is sometimes written as The Infernal Machine. After finishing the film Varnel moved to Britain where he became an established director of comedy films.

== Plot ==
A bomb planted on board a ship may go off at any moment, leaving the crew and passengers in suspense.

== Cast ==
- Chester Morris as Robert Holden
- Genevieve Tobin as Elinor Green
- Victor Jory as Alfred Doreen
- Elizabeth Patterson as Elinor's Aunt
- Edward Van Sloan as Professor Gustabve Hoffman
- Josephine Whittell as Mme. Albini
- James Bell as Spencer
- Arthur Hohl as Ship's Captain
