= Easy to Love (1934 film) =

1934 film by William Keighley

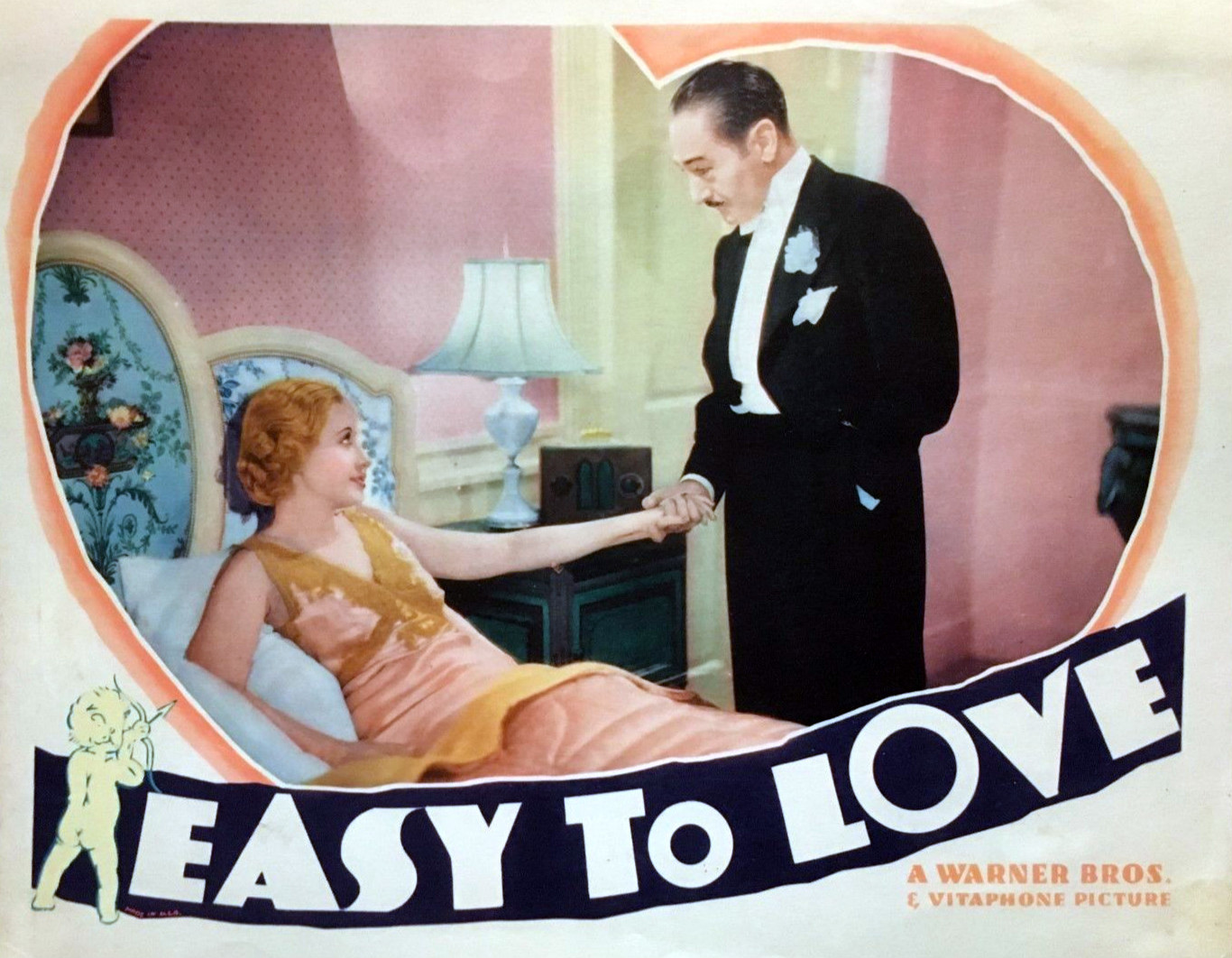
- Lobby card
- Directed by: William Keighley
- Written by: Adaptation: Carl Erickson; David Boehm
- Screenplay by: Carl Erickson; Manuel Seff
- Based on: As Good As New; 1930 play by Thompson Buchanan
- Produced by: Henry Blanke (uncredited)
- Starring: Genevieve Tobin; Adolphe Menjou; Mary Astor; Edward Everett Horton
- Cinematography: Ernest Haller
- Edited by: William Clemens
- Music by: Heinz Roemheld (uncredited)
- Production company: Warner Bros. Pictures
- Distributed by: Warner Bros. Pictures
- Release date: January 13, 1934 (US)
- Running time: 61-62 or 65 minutes
- Country: United States
- Language: English

Easy to Love is a 1934 American pre-Code romantic comedy film starring Genevieve Tobin, Adolphe Menjou, Mary Astor, and Edward Everett Horton. This was William Keighley's solo directorial debut – he had co-directed two earlier films with Howard Bretherton. It contains a mildly risqué scene with Tobin discreetly naked in the bathtub. Keighley and Tobin married in 1938. The film is based upon the 1930 play As Good As New by Thompson Buchanan.

== Plot ==
When a woman finds out her husband is having an affair, she sets out to get even.

== Cast ==
- Genevieve Tobin as Carol Townshend
- Adolphe Menjou as John Townshend
- Mary Astor as Charlotte Hopkins
- Edward Everett Horton as Eric Schulte
- Patricia Ellis as Janet Townshend
- Guy Kibbee as Justice of the Peace
- Hugh Herbert as Detective John McTavish

Uncredited:

- Paul Kaye as Paul Smith
- Hobart Cavanaugh as hotel desk clerk
- Robert Greig as Andrews, the butler
- Harold Waldridge as elevator boy
