= The Wrecker (1933 film) =

1933 film by Albert S. Rogell

- Directed by: Albert S. Rogell; Arthur Black (assistant director)
- Written by: Jo Swerling; Albert Rogell
- Produced by: Robert North
- Starring: Jack Holt; Genevieve Tobin
- Cinematography: Benjamin Kline; F. M. Browne; Fred Dawson; Jack Russell
- Edited by: Richard Cahoun; William Lyon
- Production company: Columbia Pictures
- Distributed by: Columbia Pictures
- Release date: July 10, 1933
- Running time: 72 minutes
- Country: United States
- Language: English

The Wrecker is a 1933 American Pre-Code action-romance film directed by Albert S. Rogell and starring Jack Holt, Genevieve Tobin and George E. Stone. The screenplay was by Jo Swerling. The film was produced and released by Columbia Pictures.

== Cast ==
- Jack Holt as Chuck Regan
- Genevieve Tobin as Mary Wilson
- George E. Stone as Sam Shapiro
- Sidney Blackmer as Tom Cummings
- Ward Bond as Cramer
- Irene White as Sarah
- Russell Waddle as Chuck Regan Jr.
- Wally Albright - Chuck Regan Jr.
- P. H. Levy as Hyam
- Edward LeSaint as Doctor
- Clarence Muse as Chauffeur

== Critical reception ==
A contemporary review in Variety described the film as an "old-fashioned melodrama" that is "clumsily staged," with a "[s]tory [that] follows the lines of least resistance and the direction is loose," with the result being "suspense throughout is light, mostly puffing up suddenly and petering out as rapidly in the following sequence." With respect to the acting, the review notes "Holt's standard characterization," Tobin's and Blackmer's "perfunctory performances," and that "Stone's interpretation of the junk man is all right, but much of the dialog given him is not."

== Preservation status ==
- A print is held by the Library of Congress Packard Campus for Audio-Visual Conservation.
