= You're on Your Own (game show) =

- Created by: Jack Barry; Dan Enright
- Directed by: Tom Donovan
- Presented by: Steve Dunne
- Narrated by: Hal Simms
- Composer: Paul Taubman
- Country of origin: United States

Production
- Executive producer: Robert Noah
- Producer: Howard Merrill
- Running time: 30 minutes
- Production companies: Barry & Enright Productions; CBS Television

Original release
- Network: CBS
- Release: December 22, 1956 – March 16, 1957

You're on Your Own was an American game show that aired on CBS from December 22, 1956, to March 16, 1957. Actor Steve Dunne was the emcee, with Hal Simms as the announcer and Joann Jordan was the commercial spokesperson for sponsor Hazel Bishop.

You're on Your Own was broadcast from CBS Studio 59, also known as the Mansfield Theatre, in Manhattan.

== Game play ==
=== Pilot ===
The pilot episode was recorded between December, 1955 and April 22, 1956 in New York City. Jack Barry was the emcee with Bern Bennett as the announcer.

Three contestants compete, one at a time, to win cash for what they know and how fast they can find the answer. The stage contained all kinds of reference materials including encyclopedias, dictionaries, phonograph records with record player, a telephone with phone books, etc. Players can use any of the reference material to find the necessary information. The emcee assigns either a question or task to a player along with an amount of time, between 60 and 120 seconds depending upon difficulty, to complete their assignment. The player must find the correct answer or complete their task as fast as possible and before time ran out. Three assignments were given to each player. If the player was successful on the first assignment, they earned $100 minus $10 for each time segment used to complete the assignment. Time segments represent 10% of the total number of seconds given for the assignment (Example: 60 seconds = 10 six-second time segments). The two remaining assignments were each worth 10 times the amount earned for the previous assignment minus one multiple for each time segment used (Each player can earn a possible $10,000 in a game). However, if the player was unsuccessful at any time, they lost the game and any money earned up to that point.

==== Daily double ====
The player who earned the most money on the broadcast was given a choice:

- To walk away and keep their winnings.
- To go for double-or-nothing and completing one last assignment called the "daily double".

If the player decided to try for the "daily double", they must complete their assignment and return on the next show with proof that the assignment was completed. If the player was successful, they walked away with double their winnings from the previous program. However, if the player was unsuccessful, they lost all money earned on the previous program.

=== Series version 1 ===
You're on Your Own followed a similar format to the pilot described above with a possible top prize of $25,000 to be won by a contestant.

=== Series version 2 ===
Toward the end of the series run, You're on Your Own had changed its format into one where three contestants competed against each other to answer toss-up questions. If a player buzzed in with a correct answer, they earned one point. However, giving an incorrect answer resulted in the player having to perform a humiliating stunt. The player with the most points won a special prize.

== Episode status ==
The pilot episode of You're on Your Own is known to exist and can be found at The Paley Center for Media in New York City. All series episodes are believed to have been destroyed due to network policies of the era. No other episodes are known to exist.
