= The Maltese Falcon (1931 film) =

1931 American crime film

Maltese Falcon
- Theatrical release poster
- Directed by: Roy Del Ruth
- Screenplay by: Brown Holmes; Maude Fulton; Lucien Hubbard (uncredited)
- Based on: The Maltese Falcon; 1930 novel by Dashiell Hammett
- Starring: Bebe Daniels; Ricardo Cortez
- Cinematography: William Rees
- Edited by: George Marks
- Production company: Warner Bros. Pictures
- Distributed by: Warner Bros. Pictures
- Release date: June 13, 1931
- Running time: 75 or 80 minutes
- Country: United States
- Language: English

The Maltese Falcon is a 1931 American pre-Code crime film based on the 1930 novel The Maltese Falcon by Dashiell Hammett and directed by Roy Del Ruth. The film stars Ricardo Cortez as private detective Sam Spade and Bebe Daniels as femme fatale Ruth Wonderly. The supporting cast features Dudley Digges, Thelma Todd, Walter Long, Una Merkel, and Dwight Frye. Maude Fulton and Brown Holmes wrote the screenplay; one contemporaneous report said that Lucien Hubbard was assisting them.

While the film was successful, its legacy was deeply hampered by the enforcement of the Hays Code. The film was remade by the studio twice, with its 1941 remake starring Humphrey Bogart and Mary Astor overshadowing its predecessors. The film was not seen in its entirety until after the collapse of the Code in the mid-1960s. A print has been held by the Library of Congress since the 1970s.

== Plot ==
In San Francisco, private investigator Sam Spade and his partner Miles Archer are hired by Ruth Wonderly to follow Floyd Thursby, a man that allegedly ran off with her younger sister. Later that night, police detective Tom Polhaus informs Spade that Archer has been killed while tailing Thursby. Thursby is killed later, and the police suspect Spade.

The next day, Spade calls on Wonderly in an attempt to find out her real reasons for hiring them. She gives Spade little information, but manages to keep him on the case. Later, Dr. Joel Cairo visits his office and offers him $5,000 if he can retrieve an enamel figurine of a black bird. Cairo is trying to recover it for the "rightful owner". Not knowing anything about the statuette, Spade plays along and agrees to try to recover it.

That night, at his apartment, Spade tells Wonderly about his talk with Cairo, and she becomes nervous. Then Polhaus and his superior Lt. Dundy arrive. They question Spade, but are interrupted by the screams of Wonderly, who is holding Cairo at gunpoint after he has broken in. The policemen leave with Cairo in tow. The next morning, as Wonderly sleeps in his bed, Spade lifts her latchkey and thoroughly searches her apartment, finding nothing.

Returning to his own place, Spade receives a note from Casper Gutman, inviting him to come and talk about the black bird. Over drinks and cigars, Spade learns the history and value of the statuette, which is encrusted with precious jewels. Gutman is the mastermind behind the attempt to steal it. Believing Spade has it, Gutman reveals everything he knows. Just then, Cairo arrives and tells Gutman privately that Spade does not have the falcon, as Wonderly gave it to the captain of the ship La Paloma, which arrives from Hong Kong that night. Gutman slips Spade a mickey (knockout drops) in a celebratory drink, and leaves.

Later that night, Spade arrives back in his office and finds his secretary Effie Perine asleep behind his desk. Suddenly, a man staggers in, drops the suitcase he is carrying, and dies – it is Captain Jacoby of the La Paloma, who has been shot several times. The suitcase has the black bird in it. Spade checks the bag at a baggage check and sends himself the ticket in the mail. Called in to see the district attorney because of Archer's murder, Spade is given 24 hours to wrap up the case and identify the real killers.

Wonderly lures Spade into his apartment, where Cairo and Gutman are waiting with guns. Gutman offers him an envelope with $10,000 in exchange for the falcon. Spade insists there also has to be a "fall guy" who will go to jail for the murders and suggests Gutman's gunman, Wilmer Cook. Gutman and Cairo agree to Spade's proposal. Spade calls Effie and asks her to bring the suitcase to them in the morning, while Gutman explains how Wilmer killed Thursby and Jacoby.

The bag shows up, and Wilmer escapes while the conspirators are frantically opening it and examining the bird. They soon determine that it is a fake, they have been duped by the previous owner, and Gutman and Cairo decide to make another attempt to steal it. As they leave, Gutman takes back his $10,000 from Spade at gunpoint. Spade immediately calls Detective Polhaus and tells him to pick up Gutman, Cairo and Wilmer. Confronting Wonderly, Spade accuses her of killing Archer to frame Thursby and get him out of the way. She admits it, and Spade tells her that he is going to turn her in, despite their love for each other.

When Dundy and Polhaus show up, they reveal that Wilmer killed Gutman and Cairo before being apprehended. Spade gives them Wilmer's guns, tells them that Wonderly killed Archer, and they take her away. Spade goes to visit Wonderly in prison to tell her that he has been made chief investigator for the district attorney's office. Spade instructs the prison matron to treat Wonderly well and give her whatever she wants. When the matron asks who will pay for the special treatment, Spade tells her to send the bill to the D.A.'s office: "I'll OK it."

== Cast ==
Title card for the film

- Bebe Daniels as Ruth Wonderly
- Ricardo Cortez as Sam Spade
- Dudley Digges as Casper Gutman
- Una Merkel as Effie Perine
- Robert Elliott as Detective Lieutenant Dundy
- Thelma Todd as Iva Archer
- Otto Matieson as Dr. Joel Cairo
- Walter Long as Miles Archer
- Dwight Frye as Wilmer Cook
- J. Farrell MacDonald as Detective Sergeant Tom Polhaus
- Agostino Borgato as Capt. John Jacobi (uncredited)
- Morgan Wallace as District Attorney (uncredited)

== Production ==
The Maltese Falcon was not the first Hammett story to be adapted into a motion picture. Earlier stories by Hammett, Red Harvest (filmed in 1930 as Roadhouse Nights) and City Streets (1931), preceded it. Working and alternate titles for the film have been All Women, A Woman of the World and Dangerous Female.

Principal photography took place from late January to early February 1931. Some scenes in the film were reported to be shot on location in San Francisco, though it may be that only stock footage was used.

Oscar Apfel was initially cast and listed in some studio promotions as the district attorney; however, for unknown reasons, he was replaced by Wallace.

=== Pre-Code aspects ===
The film closely follows the plot of the book. The 1941 adaptation, which began with a revised version of the 1931 script, closely follows the book as well, although most references to homosexuality, nudity, and other no longer permissible portions under the Motion Picture Production Code are missing. The dialogue for both films is often taken verbatim directly from the novel. Differences between the two films are due almost wholly to pre-Code aspects of the earlier film.

In addition to an overall lighter tone and looser pace, the 1931 film contains sexually suggestive situations. In the opening scene, an unidentified woman is shown straightening her stockings as she leaves Spade's office. Miss Wonderly (Bebe Daniels) is shown bathing, and later in the film is strip-searched by Spade over missing money. The homosexual subtext regarding Gutman, Cairo, and Wilmer in Hammett's original story was retained for the 1931 film. Wilmer is called Gutman's "boyfriend", Effie facetiously describes Cairo to Spade as "gorgeous", and Spade taunts Dundy by constantly referring to him as "sweetheart", "darling", and "precious". The bathing, strip-search, overt sexuality, homosexual subtext, and most of the loaded terminology were eliminated from the 1941 remake by the Breen Office.

== Remakes ==
In 1935, Warner Bros. attempted to re-release the film, but were denied approval by the Production Code Office owing to the film's "lewd" content. This prompted Warner Bros. to produce a new version of the film, Satan Met a Lady, starring Bette Davis and Warren William directed by William Dieterle in 1936. Many elements of the story were changed, and the film was given a comedic tone. Ultimately, the film was widely panned; Davis herself referred to the film as "junk".

In 1941, Warner Bros. remade the film in an adaptation directed by John Huston in his directorial debut. The film, starring Humphrey Bogart and Mary Astor, was released to critical acclaim and is often cited as one of the best films of all time. This version was also filmed largely verbatim to Hammett's story, but removed references to nudity, homosexuality, and other topics forbidden by the Code. It also had a much more dramatic, darker tone, which many cite as film noir.

For several decades, unedited copies of the 1931 film could not be seen in the United States; these restrictions were lifted following the demise of the Motion Picture Production Code in the mid-1960s. For television airings in the United States, the film was retitled Dangerous Female to avoid confusion with the 1941 remake.

== Reviews ==
- Photoplay, June 1931, p. 57.
