= The Maltese Falcon =

The Maltese Falcon may refer to:

== Arts and entertainment ==
- The Maltese Falcon (novel), detective novel by Dashiell Hammett published in 1930, and its film adaptations:
  - The Maltese Falcon (1931 film), starring Ricardo Cortez and directed by Roy Del Ruth
  - The Maltese Falcon (1941 film), starring Humphrey Bogart and directed by John Huston

== People ==
- Tony Drago (born 1965), Maltese snooker player nicknamed The Maltese Falcon
- Alex Vella (born 1954), Maltese boxer and biker, nicknamed The Maltese Falcon
- George Beurling (1921–1948), Canadian fighter pilot recognised as "The Falcon of Malta"

== Other uses ==
- Falco peregrinus brookei, a.k.a. the Maltese Falcon, Mediterranean region subspecies of peregrine falcon
- Tribute of the Maltese Falcon, annual tribute (a peregrine falcon) to Emperor Charles V, Holy Roman Emperor and his mother Queen Joanna of Castile
- The Maltese Falcon (yacht), a 2006 superyacht, first to feature square sails on carbon fibre masts

== See also ==
- Maltese Falcon Society, an organization for admirers of Dashiell Hammett, his novel The Maltese Falcon, and hard-boiled mystery books and writers in general
