= The Adventures of Sam Spade =

Old time American radio series

The Adventures of Sam Spade, Detective was a radio series based loosely on the private detective character Sam Spade, created by writer Dashiell Hammett for The Maltese Falcon. The show ran for 13 episodes on ABC in 1946, for 157 episodes on CBS in 1946–1949, and finally for 75 episodes on NBC in 1949–1951. The series starred Howard Duff (and later, Steve Dunne) as Sam Spade and Lurene Tuttle as his secretary Effie, and took a considerably more tongue-in-cheek approach to the character than the novel or movie. The announcer was Dick Joy. Spade's greetings and farewells to Effie (“Me, sweetheart” and “Goodnight, sweetheart” respectively) are a recurring motif on the show. Keeping with this, period standard ”Goodnight Sweetheart” was used as the closing theme of each episode.

The series was largely overseen by producer/director William Spier. In 1947, Spier and scriptwriters Jason James and Bob Tallman received an Edgar Award for Best Radio Drama from the Mystery Writers of America.

Before the series, Sam Spade had been played in radio adaptations of The Maltese Falcon by both Edward G. Robinson (in a 1943 Lux Radio Theater production) and by Humphrey Bogart (in a 1941 Academy Award Theater production), both on CBS.

Dashiell Hammett's name was removed from the series in the late 1940s because he was being investigated for involvement with the Communist Party. Later, when Howard Duff's name appeared in the Red Channels book, he was not invited to play the role when the series made the switch to NBC in 1950.

== The 1946–1951 series ==
The different incarnations of the series were:

- The Adventures of Sam Spade (1946, ABC) – 13 30-minute episodes
- The Adventures of Sam Spade (1946–49, CBS) – 157 30-minute episodes
- The Adventures of Sam Spade (1949–50, NBC) – 51 30-minute episodes
- The Adventures of Sam Spade (1950–51, NBC) – 24 30-minute episodes

=== The Adventures of Sam Spade (1946, ABC) ===
13 30-minute episodes
Starring Howard Duff as Sam Spade and Lurene Tuttle as Effie
(Duff replaced on some occasions by Stephen Dunne)

- "Sam and the Guiana Sovereign" (July 12, 1946)
- "Sam and the Farewell Murders" (July 19, 1946)
- "Sam and the Unhappy Poet" (July 26, 1946)
- "Sam and the Psyche" (August 2, 1946)
- "Death and Company" (August 9, 1946)
- "Two Sharp Knives" (August 16, 1946)
- "Zig Zags of Treachery" (August 23, 1946)
- "Sam and the Scythian Tiara" (August 30, 1946)
- "The Corporation Murders" (September 6, 1946)
- "The Dot Marlow Caper, Part 1" (September 13, 1946)
- "The Dot Marlow Caper, Part 2" (September 20, 1946)
- "The Count on Billy Burke" (September 27, 1946)
- "The Gutting of Couffignal" (October 4, 1946)

=== The Adventures of Sam Spade (1946–1949, CBS) ===
157 30-minute episodes
Starring Howard Duff as Sam Spade and Lurene Tuttle as Effie
Sponsor: Wildroot Cream-Oil
Writers: John Michael Hayes, Gil Doud, Bob Tallman

Guest stars: Sandra Gould (played the "new secretary" while Lurene Tuttle was on vacation, in the June 27, 1948, show), William Conrad, Jack Webb.

- "The Blood Money Caper" (September 29, 1946)
- "The Unwritten Law Caper" (October 6, 1946)
- "The Ten Clues Caper" (October 13, 1946)
- "The Fly Paper Caper" (October 20, 1946)
- "The Midway Caper" (October 27, 1946)
- "The Certified Czech Caper" (November 3, 1946)
- "Sam and the Farewell Murders" (November 10, 1946)
- "The Hot Ice Caper" (November 17, 1946)
- "The Kandy Tooth Caper, Part 1" (November 24, 1946) (reperformed on Suspense January 10, 1948)
- "The Kandy Tooth Caper, Part 2" (December 1, 1946) (see note for part 1)
- "The Minks of Turk Street" (December 8, 1946)
- "The Picture Frame Caper" (December 15, 1946)
- "Sam and the Three Wise Men" (December 22, 1946)
- "The Golden Horeshoe" (December 29, 1946)
- "The Liewelyn Caper" (January 5, 1947)
- "The Cremona Clock Caper" (January 12, 1947)
- "The False Face Caper" (January 19, 1947)
- "The Agamemnon Caper" (January 26, 1947)
- "The Dead Duck Caper" (February 2, 1947)
- "The Girl With The Silver Eyes" (February 9, 1947)
- "Inside Story on Kid Slade" (February 16, 1947)
- "The Big Production Caper" (February 23, 1947)
- "The Uncle Money Caper" (March 2, 1947)
- "Orpheus and His Lute" (March 9, 1947)
- "The Murder About Bliss" (March 16, 1947)
- "Too Many Spades" (March 23, 1947)
- "The Dancing Pearl Caper" (March 30, 1947)
- "The Poisonville Caper" (April 6, 1947)
- "The Double-Scar Caper" (April 13, 1947)
- "The Scrooge of Portrero Street" (April 20, 1947)
- "The Debutante Caper" (April 27, 1947)
- "Duet in Spades" (May 4, 1947)
- "The Yule Log Caper" (May 11, 1947)
- "The Assistant Murderer" (May 18, 1947)
- "Jury Duty" (May 25, 1947)
- "The Mishakoff Emeralds" (June 1, 1947)
- "The Calcutta Trunk Caper" (June 8, 1947)
- "The Convertible Caper" (June 15, 1947)
- "The Greek Letter Caper" (June 22, 1947)
- "The Cosmic Harmony Caper" (June 29, 1947)
- "The Simile Caper" (July 6, 1947)
- "The Buff-Orpington Caper" (July 13, 1947)
- "Sam and the Unhappy Poet" (July 20, 1947)
- "The Gold Rush Caper" (July 27, 1947)
- "The Crooked Neck Caper" (August 3, 1947)
- "The Commonwealth Tankard" (August 10, 1947)
- "The Doctor's Dilemma Caper" (August 17, 1947)
- "The Jade Dragon Caper" (August 24, 1947)
- "The Corkscrew Caper" (August 31, 1947)
- "The Forty-Nine Cent, Caper" (September 7, 1947)
- "The Cinderella Caper" (September 14, 1947)
- "The April Caper" (September 21, 1947)
- "The Madcap Caper" (September 28, 1947)
- "The Adam Figg Caper" (October 5, 1947)
- "The Tears of Buddha Caper" (October 12, 1947)
- "The Untouchable Caper" (October 19, 1947)
- "The Bonnie Fair Caper" (October 26, 1947)
- "The Wrong Guy Caper" (November 2, 1947)
- "The Bow Window Caper" (November 9, 1947)
- "The Purple Poodle Caper" (November 16, 1947)
- "The Caper With Eight Diamonds" (November 23, 1947)
- "The Full House Caper" (November 30, 1947)
- "The Palermo Vendetta Caper" (December 7, 1947)
- "The Gumshoe Caper" (December 14, 1947)
- "The Nick Saint Caper" (December 21, 1947)
- "The Perfect Score Caper" (December 28, 1947)
- "The One Hour Caper" (January 4, 1948)
- "The Short Life Caper" (January 11, 1948)
- "The Pike's Head Caper" (January 18, 1948)
- "The Gold Key Caper" (January 25, 1948)
- "The Nimrod Caper" (February 1, 1948)
- "The Great Drought Caper" (February 8, 1948)
- "The Goldie Gates Caper" (February 15, 1948)
- "The Mason Grayson Caper" (February 22, 1948)
- "The Grim Reaper Caper" (February 29, 1948)
- "John's Other Wife's Other Husband" (March 7, 1948)
- "The Ides of March Caper" (March 14, 1948)
- "The Nightmare Town Caper" (March 21, 1948)
- "The Blood Money Payoff" (March 28, 1948)
- Title Unknown (April 4, 1948)
- "The Judas Caper" (April 11, 1948)
- "The Night Flight Caper" (April 18, 1948)
- "The Great Lover Caper" (April 25, 1948)
- "The Double-S Caper" (May 2, 1948)
- "The Curiosity Caper" (May 9, 1948)
- "The Girl Called Echs Caper" (May 16, 1948)
- "The Navarraise Falcon" (May 23, 1948)
- "The Prisoner of Zenda Caper" (May 30, 1948)
- "The I.Q. Caper" (June 6, 1948)
- "The Honest Cop Caper" (June 13, 1948)
- "The Caper with Two Death Beds" (June 20, 1948)
- "The Bail Bond Caper" (June 27, 1948)
- "The Rushlight Diamond Caper" (July 4, 1948)
- "The Wheel of Life Caper" (July 11, 1948)
- "The Missing Newshawk Caper" (July 18, 1948)
- "The Mad Scientist Caper" (July 25, 1948)
- "The Dry Martini Caper" (August 1, 1948)
- "The Bluebeard Caper" (August 8, 1948)
- "The Critical Author Caper" (August 15, 1948)
- "The Vaphio Cup Caper" (August 22, 1948)
- "The Lawless Caper" (August 29, 1948)
- "The Stella Starr Caper" (September 5, 1948)
- "The Lazarus Caper" (September 12, 1948)
- "The Hot 100 Grand Caper" (September 19, 1948)
- "The Dick Foley Caper" (September 26, 1948)
- "The Sugar Kane Caper" (October 3, 1948)
- "The Bostwick Snatch Caper" (October 10, 1948)
- "The Rumanian Con Game Caper" (October 17, 1948)
- "The Insomnia Caper" (October 24, 1948)
- "The Fairley-Bright Caper" (October 31, 1948)
- "The S.Q.P. Caper" (November 7, 1948)
- "The Gin Rummy Caper" (November 14, 1948)
- "The Golden Fleece Caper" (November 21, 1948)
- "The Quarter-Eagle Caper" (November 28, 1948)
- "The Neveroff Masterpiece Caper" (December 5, 1948)
- "The Bouncing Betty Caper" (December 12, 1948)
- "The Giveaway Caper" (December 19, 1948)
- "The Nick Saint Caper" (December 26, 1948)
- "The Three-Sided Bullet Caper" (January 2, 1949)
- "The Double Negative Caper" (January 9, 1949)
- "The Betrayal in Bumpus Hell Caper" (January 16, 1949)
- "The Main Event Caper" (January 23, 1949)
- "The Double Life Caper" (January 30, 1949)
- "The Firebug Caper" (February 6, 1949)
- "The Brothers Keeper Caper" (February 13, 1949)
- "The Attitude Caper" (February 20, 1949)
- "The Three Cornered Frame Caper" (February 27, 1949)
- "The Waltzing Matilda Caper" (March 6, 1949)
- "The Underseal Caper" (March 13, 1949)
- "The Trojan Horse Caper" (March 20, 1949)
- "The Loveletter Caper" (March 27, 1949)
- "The Vacation Caper" (April 3, 1949)
- "The Stopped Watch Caper" (April 10, 1949)
- "Edith Hamilton" (April 17, 1949)
- "The Hot Cargo Caper" (April 24, 1949)
- "The Battles of Belvedere" (May 1, 1949)
- "The Fast Talk Caper" (May 8, 1949)
- "The Darling Daughter Caper" (May 15, 1949)
- "The Cartwright Clip Caper" (May 22, 1949)
- "The Jane Doe Caper" (May 29, 1949)
- "The Overjord Caper" (June 5, 1949; AKA "The Corpse in The Murphy Bed")
- "Sam and the Guiana Sovereign" (June 12, 1949)
- "The Apple of Eve Caper" (June 19, 1949)
- "The Goat's Milk Caper" (June 26, 1949)
- "The Hamburger Sandwich Caper" (July 3, 1949)
- "The Queen Bee Caper" (July 10, 1949)
- "The Cuttyhunk Caper" (July 17, 1949)
- "The Tears of Night Caper" (July 24, 1949)
- "The Hot-Foot Caper" (July 31, 1949)
- "The Champion Caper" (August 7, 1949)
- "The Sourdough Mountain Caper" (August 14, 1949)
- "The Silver Key Caper" (August 21, 1949)
- "The Prodigal Daughter Caper" (August 28, 1949)
- "The Flashback Caper" (September 4, 1949)
- "The Costume Caper" (September 11, 1949)
- "Over My Dead Body Caper" (September 18, 1949)
- "The Chargogagogmanchogagogchabunamungamog Caper" (September 25, 1949)

=== The Adventures of Sam Spade (1949–1950, NBC) ===
51 30-minute episodes
Starring Howard Duff as Sam Spade and Lurene Tuttle as Effie
Sponsor: Wildroot Cream Oil

- "The Junior G-Man Caper" (October 2, 1949)
- "The Hot Hothouse Caper" (October 9, 1949)
- "The Pretty Polly Caper" (October 16, 1949)
- Title Unknown (October 23, 1949)
- Title Unknown (October 30, 1949)
- "The Cheesecake Caper" (November 6, 1949)
- "The Blues In The Night Caper" (November 13, 1949)
- "The Peacock Feather Caper" (November 20, 1949)
- Title Unknown (November 27, 1949)
- "The Floppsey, Moppsey and Cottontail Caper" (December 4, 1949)
- Title Unknown (December 11, 1949)
- "The Whispering Death Caper" (December 18, 1949)
- "The Canterbury Christmas 7" (December 25, 1949)
- "The Gorgeous Gemini Caper" (January 1, 1950)
- "The Third Personville Caper" (January 8, 1950)
- "The Phantom Witness Caper" (January 15, 1950)
- "The Wedding Belle Caper" (January 22, 1950)
- "The Too Many Leads Caper" (January 29, 1950)
- "The Black Magic Caper" (February 5, 1950)
- "The Crossword Puzzle Caper" (February 12, 1950)
- "The Valentine's Day Caper" (February 19, 1950)
- "The Cornelius J. Morningside Caper" (February 26, 1950)
- "The Homicidal Husband Caper" (March 5, 1950)
- "The Barbary Ghost Caper" (March 12, 1950)
- "The Emerald Eyes Caper" (March 19, 1950)
- "The Bay Psalm Caper" (March 26, 1950)
- "The Endurance Caper" (April 2, 1950)
- "The Picture Frame Caper" (April 9, 1950)
- "The Kansas Kid Caper" (April 16, 1950)
- "The Caldwell Caper" (April 23, 1950)
- "The Hamite Curse Caper" (April 30, 1950)
- "Caper With Marjorie's Things" (May 7, 1950)
- "The Prodigal Son Caper" (May 14, 1950)
- "The Red Amapola Caper" (May 21, 1950)
- "The Honest Thief Caper" (May 28, 1950)
- "The V.I.P. Caper" (June 4, 1950)
- "The Color Scheme Caper" (June 11, 1950)
- "The Elmer Longtail Caper" (June 18, 1950)
- "The Toytown Caper" (June 25, 1950)
- "The Beryl Green Caper" (July 2, 1950)
- "The Runaway Redhead Caper" (July 9, 1950)
- "The Man Who Knew Almost Everything Caper" (July 16, 1950)
- "The Stormy Weather Caper" (July 23, 1950)
- "The Rod And Reel Caper" (July 30, 1950)
- "The Bell Of Solomon Caper" (August 6, 1950)
- "The Missing Persons Caper" (August 13, 1950)
- "The Preposterous Caper" (August 20, 1950)
- "The Too Many Clients Caper" (August 27, 1950)
- "The Farmer's Daughter Caper" (September 3, 1950)
- "The Big Little Woody Caper" (September 10, 1950)
- "The Femme Fatale Caper" (September 17, 1950)

=== The Adventures of Sam Spade (1950–1951, NBC) ===
24 30-minute episodes
Starring Steve Dunne as Sam Spade and Lurene Tuttle as Effie

- "Caper Over My Dead Body" (November 17, 1950)
- "The Terrified Turkey Caper" (November 24, 1950)
- "The Dog Bed Caper" (December 1, 1950)
- "The Dry Gulch" (December 8, 1950)
- "The 25/1235679 Caper" (December 15, 1950)
- "The Caper Concerning Big" (December 22, 1950)
- "The Prodigal Panda Caper" (December 29, 1950)
- "The Biddle Riddle Caper" (January 5, 1951)
- "The Red Star Caper" (January 12, 1951)
- "The Cloak and Dagger Caper" (January 19, 1951)
- "The Chateau McCloud Caper" (January 26, 1951)
- "The String Of Death Caper" (February 2, 1951)
- "The Sure Thing Caper" (February 9, 1951)
- "The Soap Opera Caper" (February 16, 1951)
- "The Shot in the Dark Caper" (February 23, 1951)
- "The Crab Louis Caper" (March 2, 1951)
- "The Spanish Prisoner Caper" (March 9, 1951)
- "The Sinister Siren Caper" (March 16, 1951)
- "The Kimberley Cross Caper" (March 23, 1951)
- "The Vendetta Caper" (March 30, 1951)
- "The Denny Shane Caper" (April 6, 1951)
- "The Civic Pride Caper" (April 13, 1951)
- "The Rowdy Dowser Caper" (April 20, 1951)
- "The Hail and Farewell Caper" (April 27, 1951)
