= Stephen Dunne (actor) =

American actor, radio personality and disc jockey (1918–1977)

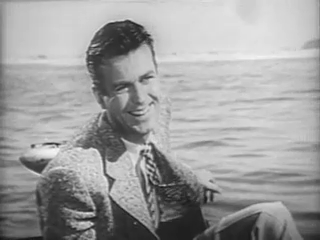
- Dunne in the 1945 film Doll Face
- Born: Francis Michael Dunne; January 13, 1918; Northampton, Massachusetts, U.S.
- Died: September 28, 1977 (aged 59)
- Other names: Stephen Dunn, Steve Dunn, Steve Dunne
- Occupations: Actor, radio personality, disc jockey
- Years active: 1936–1977
- Spouse: Vivian Belliveau (m. 1940)
- Children: 2

Francis Michael Dunne (January 13, 1918 – September 28, 1977) was an American actor, radio personality and disc jockey. He was active in television and films from 1945 to 1973, and was also credited as Steve Dunn, Michael Dunne, Stephan Dunne, and Steve Dunne.

== Early years ==
Dunne was born in Northampton, Massachusetts. He majored in drama and journalism during his two-and-a-half years at the University of Alabama. While there, he worked at a local radio station and "found himself in love with the business."

== Radio ==
Dunne worked as an announcer at a radio station in Worcester, Massachusetts, and then went to New York, where he worked as both an announcer and a newscaster. He went on to star as private eye Sam Spade in The Adventures of Sam Spade from 1950-51. He played Lucky Larson in Deadline Mystery (1947),, the title character Dr. Daniel Danfield in Danger, Dr. Danfield (1946–47), and he was the announcer for The Jack Kirkwood Show (1943–46).

== Television ==
In 1950, Dunne starred in Love and Kisses on KTSL-TV in Los Angeles. On network television, Dunne starred in the comedy Professional Father (1955). He was the announcer for The Bob Crosby Show (1958) and The Liberace Show (1958-1959).

In the 1960-61 season, he and Mark Roberts played private detective brothers in the syndicated television series The Brothers Brannagan. He was also the host of the game shows Truth or Consequences (nighttime version, 1957), You're on Your Own (1956-1957) and Double Exposure (1961).

Dunne appeared in several television shows, including Professional Father, The Millionaire, Alfred Hitchcock Presents, The Alfred Hitchcock Hour, Petticoat Junction, Batman (episodes 47 and 48), Nanny and the Professor, Mannix, The Beverly Hillbillies, Dragnet 1967, The George Burns and Gracie Allen Show, and The Brady Bunch.

== Later years and death ==
In 1968, Dunne became director of sales for Hollywood Video Center, a division of Western Video Industries.

Dunne died on September 28, 1977, aged 59.

== Personal life ==
Dunne married Vivian Belliveau in 1940. They had a son, Stephen, and a daughter, Margaret.

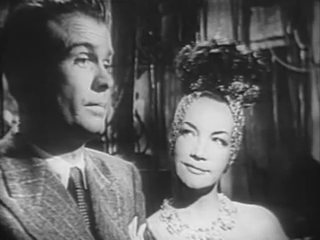
With Carmen Miranda in Doll Face

== Partial filmography ==
- Junior Miss (1945) - Uncle Willis Reynolds
- Doll Face (1945) - Frederick Manly Gerard
- Shock (1946) - Dr. Stevens
- Colonel Effingham's Raid (1946) - Professor Edward 'Ed' Bland
- Mother Wore Tights (1947) - Roy Bivins
- The Son of Rusty (1947) - Jed Barlow
- The Woman from Tangier (1948) - Ray Shapley
- The Return of October (1948) - Professor Stewart
- The Dark Past (1948) - Owen Talbot
- The Big Sombrero (1949) - Jimmy Garland
- Law of the Barbary Coast (1949) - Phil Morton
- Miss Grant Takes Richmond (1949) - Ralph Winton
- Kazan (1949) - Thomas Weyman
- Rusty Saves a Life (1949) - Fred Gibson
- Lady Possessed (1952) - Tom Wilson
- The WAC from Walla Walla (1952) - Lieutenant Tom Mayfield
- The Gentle Gunman (1952) - Brennan (uncredited)
- Above and Beyond (1952) - Major Harry Bratton, Co-Pilot B-29 Tests
- Cha-Cha-Cha Boom! (1956) - Bill Haven
- Ten Thousand Bedrooms (1957) - Tom Crandall
- I Married a Woman (1958) - Bob Sanders
- Home Before Dark (1958) - Hamilton Gregory
- Alfred Hitchcock Presents (1959) (Season 5 Episode 10: "Special Delivery") - Bill Fortnam
- Alfred Hitchcock Presents (1960) (Season 6 Episode 11: "The Man with Two Faces") - Lieutenant Meade
- Alfred Hitchcock Presents (1961) (Season 7 Episode 2: "Bang! You're Dead") - Rick Sheffield
- Alfred Hitchcock Presents (1961) (Season 7 Episode 10: "Services Rendered") - Young Amnesiac
- The Explosive Generation (1961) - Bobby Herman Sr.
- Hand of Death (1962) - Tom Holland
- The Alfred Hitchcock Hour (1963) (Season 1 Episode 16: "What Really Happened") - Jack Wentworth
- Willy Wonka & the Chocolate Factory (1971) - Stanley Kael, Second Newscaster (uncredited)
- Superdad (1973) - TV Moderator (final film role)
