= Satan Met a Lady =

1936 film by William Dieterle

- Original poster
- Directed by: William Dieterle
- Screenplay by: Brown Holmes
- Based on: The Maltese Falcon; 1930 novel by Dashiell Hammett
- Produced by: Henry Blanke
- Starring: Bette Davis; Warren William
- Cinematography: Arthur Edeson
- Edited by: Warren Low
- Music by: Bernhard Kaun; Heinz Roemheld
- Distributed by: Warner Bros. Pictures
- Release date: July 22, 1936
- Running time: 74 minutes
- Country: United States
- Language: English

Satan Met a Lady is a 1936 American detective film directed by William Dieterle and starring Bette Davis and Warren William.

The screenplay by Brown Holmes is a loose adaptation of the 1929 novel The Maltese Falcon by Dashiell Hammett.

== Plot ==
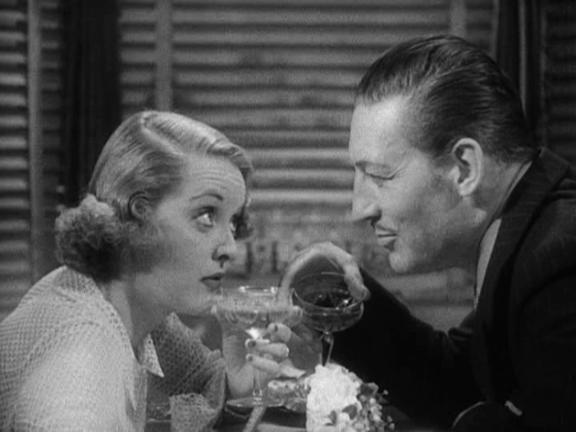
Says Ted: "After I've cleared up a couple murders, you and I could have lots of fun."

Private detective Ted Shane returns to work with his former partner Ames, who is not particularly happy about the situation because his wife Astrid dated Ted before they were wed.

Valerie Purvis hires the detectives to locate a man called Farrow, and when both Ames and Farrow are found dead, Shane is suspected of both murders.

Shane finds his office and apartment have been ransacked and his secretary Miss Murgatroyd has been locked in a closet by Anthony Travers, who is in search of an 8th-century ram's horn rumored to be filled with jewels. Madame Barabbas is also searching for the treasure and sends a gunman to bring Shane to her.

Working all sides of the street, Shane makes deals with each of them to find the horn, and eventually winds up in possession of a package allegedly containing it, but it turns out to be full of sand instead of jewels.

The police round up all the suspects, but Shane and Valerie escape. He baits her into confessing to Ames's murder and tries to apprehend her for the $10,000 reward, but Valerie thwarts him by allowing a washroom attendant to turn her in to the police instead. Miss Murgatroyd then shows up and claims Shane for her own.

== Cast ==
- Bette Davis as Valerie Purvis
- Warren William as Ted Shane
- Alison Skipworth as Madame Barabbas
- Arthur Treacher as Anthony Travers
- Winifred Shaw as Astrid Ames
- Marie Wilson as Miss Murgatroyd
- Porter Hall as Milton Ames
- Olin Howland as Detective Dunhill
- Charles C. Wilson as Detective Pollock
- William Davidson as Spokesman (uncredited)
- John Elliott as Committee Member (uncredited)
- Leo White as Waiter (uncredited)

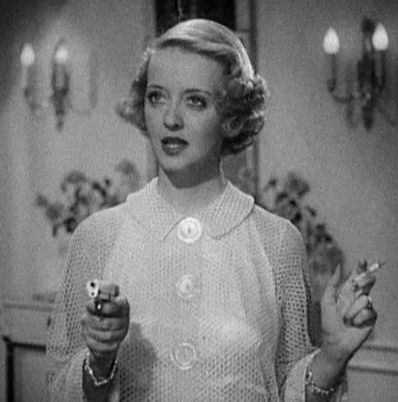
Valerie: "Would you mind taking off your hat in the presence of a lady with a gun?"

== Production ==
Since they already owned the screen rights to the Dashiell Hammett novel The Maltese Falcon, economical Warner Bros. Pictures executives decided to film another version of the book and assigned contract writer Brown Holmes to pen the screenplay. Showing little regard for the original material, Holmes converted its object of desire – a jewel-encrusted statuette of a falcon – into a ram's horn filled with precious gems, changed character names (Sam Spade became "Ted Shane"), altered the sex of one of the criminal masterminds from male to female, and retitled the story, first to The Man in the Black Hat and then Men on Her Mind.

Filming began on December 1, 1935, although leading lady Bette Davis, upset that she was being forced to film "junk" after completing a prestige project like The Petrified Forest, failed to report to the set. "I was so distressed by the whole tone of the script and the vapidity of my part that I marched up to Mr. Warner's office and demanded that I be given work that was commensurate with my proven ability," she later recalled in her autobiography. "I was promised wonderful things if only I would do this film." She was suspended on December 3 and, angry and resentful but in need of her salary to cover living expenses for her mother and medical care for her sister, she reported to work three days later.

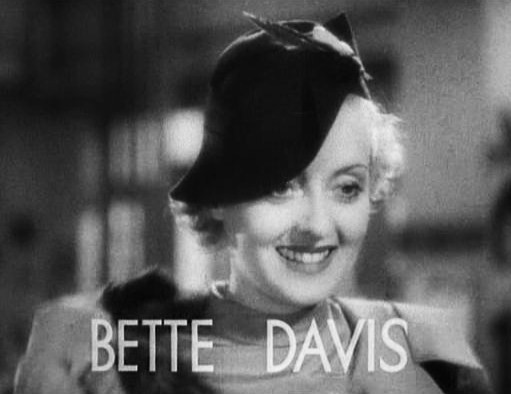
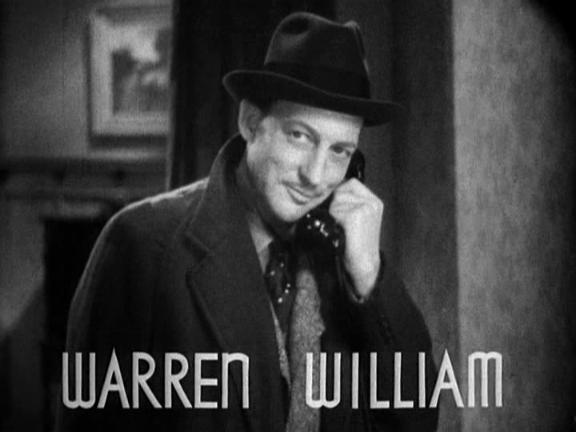
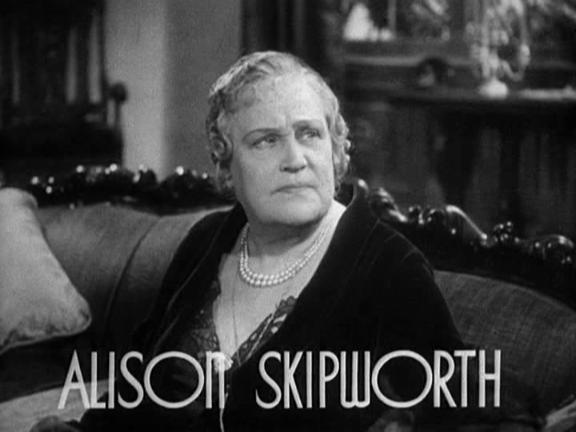
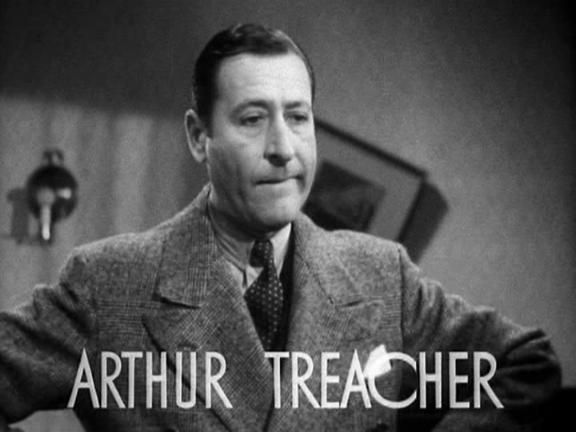

Upon completion of principal photography, art director Max Parker assembled a rough cut that so confused studio heads they assigned Warren Low to re-edit it. It was released on July 22, 1936, retitled Satan Met a Lady (the book had a line describing Sam Spade as looking "rather pleasantly like a blonde Satan"). By then, Davis was in London, having been placed on suspension for refusing to portray a lumberjack in God's Country and the Woman. In later years, she recalled insisting "I won't do it! Satan Met a Lady was bad enough, but this is absolute tripe."

== Critical reception ==
Bosley Crowther of the New York Times called the film "a cynical farce of elaborate and sustained cheapness" that "deserves to be quoted as a classic of dullness" and observed, "Without taking sides in a controversy of such titanic proportions, it is no more than gallantry to observe that if Bette Davis had not effectually espoused her own cause against the Warners recently by quitting her job, the Federal Government eventually would have had to step in and do something about her. After viewing Satan Met a Lady … all thinking people must acknowledge that a Bette Davis Reclamation Project (BDRP) to prevent the waste of this gifted lady's talents would not be a too-drastic addition to our various programs for the conservation of natural resources." He concluded, "So disconnected and lunatic are the picture's incidents, so irrelevant and monstrous its people, that one lives through it in constant expectation of seeing a group of uniformed individuals appear suddenly from behind the furniture and take the entire cast into protective custody. There is no story, merely a farrago of nonsense representing a series of practical studio compromises with an unworkable script. It is the kind of mistake over which the considerate and discreet thing is to draw the veil of silence."

Variety's 1936 review was less vitriolic but hardly enthusiastic. "This is an inferior remake of [1931's] The Maltese Falcon.... Many changes have been made in story structure as well as title, but none is an improvement." It noted that both Davis's and William's credits were dropped "below the title" and that "Davis has much less to do than at least one other femme member of the cast." There were mixed impressions of William: while Ricardo Cortez's Sam Spade in the 1931 picture had been "natural and amusing, [William] and his satiric crime detection are now forced and unnatural." Yet at the same time, "his performance is all that keeps the picture moving in many lagging moments." In summary, the review said, "There's hardly any mystery in this version. The comedy isn't strong enough to fill the bill."

Time Out London noted that although the film can't compare to the 1941 screen adaptation of the Hammett novel, "Thanks to Dieterle's stylishly witty direction and excellent performances, it's nevertheless enjoyably and quirkily funny, at least until just before the end, when a whole wedge of undigested plot exposition suddenly catches up with the action."

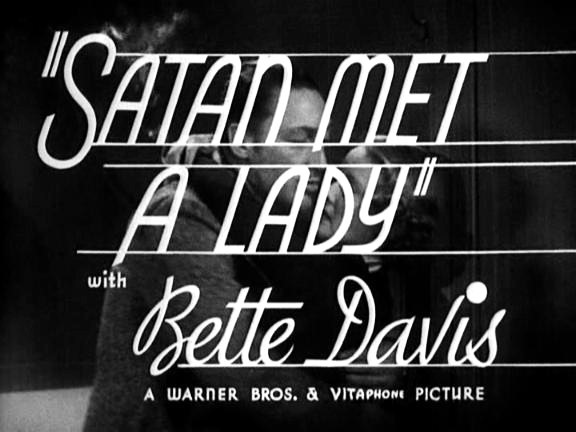
