= Snowed Under =

1936 film by Ray Enright

- theatrical release lobby card
- Directed by: Ray Enright
- Written by: Edward Chodorov (uncredited contributor); Mary C. McCall, Jr. (uncredited contributor)
- Screenplay by: F. Hugh Herbert; Brown Holmes
- Based on: "Snowed Under" (short story) by Lawrence Saunders
- Produced by: Harry Joe Brown (uncredited)
- Starring: George Brent; Genevieve Tobin; Glenda Farrell; Patricia Ellis
- Cinematography: Arthur L. Todd
- Edited by: Harold McLernon
- Music by: Heinz Roemheld (uncredited)
- Production company: Warner Bros. Pictures
- Distributed by: Warner Bros. Pictures
- Release date: April 4, 1936 (US)
- Running time: 63 minutes
- Country: United States
- Language: English

Snowed Under is a 1936 American romantic comedy film directed by Ray Enright and starring George Brent as a playwright who is working under a tight deadline. He becomes snowed in in his remote cabin with two ex-wives and a girlfriend, played by Genevieve Tobin, Glenda Farrell and Patricia Ellis.

== Cast ==
- George Brent as Alan Tanner
- Genevieve Tobin as Alice Merritt ex-wife #1
- Glenda Farrell as Daisy Lowell ex-wife #2
- Patricia Ellis as Pat Quinn
- Frank McHugh as Orlando Rowe
- John Eldredge as McBride
- Porter Hall as Arthur Layton
- Helen Lowell as Mrs. Canterbury
- Mary Treen as Miss. Jones (uncredited)
- Shirley Lloyd as Blonde who answered telephone (uncredited)
