= Charlie Wild, Private Detective =

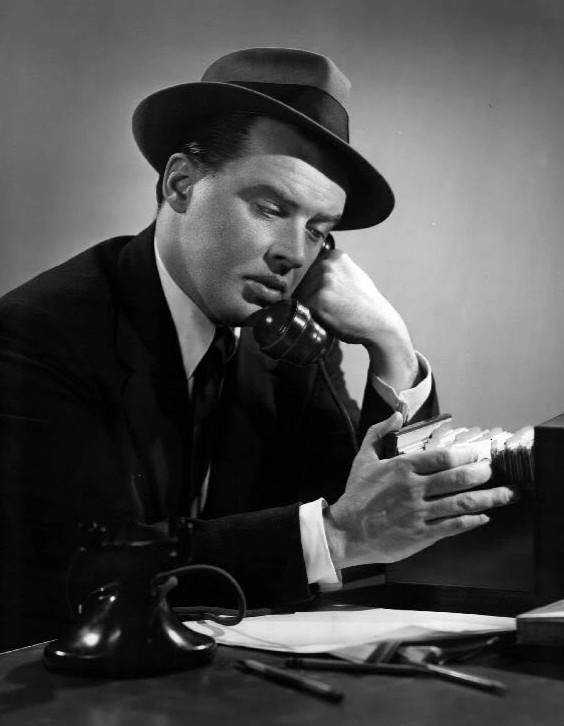
- John McQuade as Charlie Wild (1951)
- Genre: Crime
- Written by: Peter Barry; Stanley Niss
- Directed by: Paul Nickell; Leonard Valenta
- Starring: Kevin O'Morrison (1950–51); John McQuade (1951–52); Philippa Bevans; John Shellie; Philip Truex; Cloris Leachman
- Country of origin: United States
- No. of seasons: 2
- No. of episodes: 64

Production
- Producers: Lawrence White; Walter Tibbals; Carlo DeAngelo; Herbert Brodkin
- Running time: 30 minutes

Original release
- Network: CBS (1950–1951); ABC (1951–1952); DuMont (1952)
- Release: December 22, 1950 – June 19, 1952

Charlie Wild, Private Detective is an American detective series that aired on three of the four major American television networks of the 1950s.

== Origin ==
The program was the televised version of a radio program with the same title. At least some of the episodes that were broadcast on CBS were simulcasts of the radio program.

== Premise ==
Charlie Wild was a private investigator with headquarters in New York City, with most of his cases involving murder. He often used violence to solve cases, bending the law at times without actually breaking it. Effie Perrine was Wild's secretary.

A review of the program's premiere episode in the trade publication Billboard described the plot as "run-of-the-mill" except that "the menace ran to silk dressing gowns and Beethoven symphonies" as Wild solved two murders. The reviewer summarized by saying that the show needed "more original story approach and less hokum."

A subsequent Billboard review (of the September 11, 1951, episode) indicated little change in evaluation. Haps Kemper wrote that the "plot was routine, the script hardly scintillating, and the performance unenthusiastic" except for that of the female guest star.

== Broadcasts ==
The series first aired live on CBS from December 22, 1950, to June 27, 1951 (20 episodes). It was initially on alternate Friday nights, but it moved to every Wednesday night effective the week of April 16. It then aired on ABC from September 11, 1951, to March 4, 1952 (27 episodes). On March 13, 1952, the DuMont Television Network picked the series up for the last three months, with 17 episodes, ending on June 19, 1952.

The CBS broadcasts were sponsored by Wildroot Cream-Oil hair tonic. The ABC series was sponsored by Mogen David wine.

== Cast ==
John McQuade replaced Kevin O'Morrison as Charlie Wild after the first seven episodes. Cloris Leachman played Effie Perrine. Sandy Becker and Bob Williams were the announcers.

== Episode status ==
Fifteen episodes are held by the UCLA Film and Television Archive, including two from the DuMont series. The Paley Center for Media holds four episodes from the DuMont series. The CBS and ABC editions are considered lost..

== Critical response ==
Ben Gross wrote in the New York Daily News that the show's situations and characters had already been used "dozens of times on video shows". He also disliked the dialogue, which he said was "so stilted that, at times, it becomes ridiculous."

== See also ==
- List of programs broadcast by the DuMont Television Network
- List of surviving DuMont Television Network broadcasts

== Bibliography ==
- David Weinstein, The Forgotten Network: DuMont and the Birth of American Television (Philadelphia: Temple University Press, 2004) ISBN 1-59213-245-6
- Alex McNeil, Total Television, Fourth edition (New York: Penguin Books, 1980) ISBN 0-14-024916-8
- Tim Brooks and Earle Marsh, The Complete Directory to Prime Time Network TV Shows, Third edition (New York: Ballantine Books, 1964) ISBN 0-345-31864-1
