= Moon over Miami (film) =

1941 film by Walter Lang

Moon Over Miami
- Film poster
- Directed by: Walter Lang
- Screenplay by: Vincent Lawrence; Brown Holmes; George Seaton (adaptation); Lynn Starling (adaptation)
- Based on: Three Blind Mice; 1938 play by Stephen Powys
- Produced by: Harry Joe Brown
- Starring: Don Ameche; Betty Grable; Robert Cummings
- Cinematography: Allen M. Davey; J. Peverell Marley; Leon Shamroy
- Edited by: Walter Thompson
- Color process: Technicolor
- Production company: 20th Century Fox
- Distributed by: 20th Century Fox
- Release date: July 4, 1941
- Running time: 91 minutes
- Country: United States
- Language: English

Moon Over Miami is a 1941 American musical comedy film directed by Walter Lang with Betty Grable and Don Ameche in leading roles and co-starring Robert Cummings, Carole Landis, Jack Haley and Charlotte Greenwood. It was adapted from the play Three Blind Mice by Stephen Powys. This was previously adapted into a 1938 film titled Three Blind Mice directed by William A. Seiter and starring Loretta Young, Joel McCrea and David Niven.

It was one of Haley's last appearances in a major, large-budgeted film; after 1943, he made mostly B-pictures. The film's original songs were written by Leo Robin and Ralph Rainger.

== Plot ==
Sisters Kay and Barbara Latimer work as carhops in a Texas drive-in restaurant with their aunt Susan, the cook, when they are notified that an expected inheritance of $55,000 is only $4,000 after taxes and fees. Determined to marry a millionaire, Kay tells Barbara and Susan to spend the money on a trip to Miami, hoping to hook a rich man at a resort.

With Barbara posing as Kay's secretary and Susan as her maid, the three women check into the Flamingo Hotel and make the acquaintance of Jack O'Hara, a bartender who pontificates about his hatred of fortune hunters. Jack, who quickly becomes enamored with Susan, believes that Kay is on the level and promises to steer her away from gold diggers.

Kay finagles an invitation to a party being hosted by rich Jeffrey Bolton, and while there, also meets Phil O'Neil, heir to the renowned O'Neil Mines. Boyhood friends Jeff and Phil begin a fierce rivalry for Kay, who cannot make up her mind between the two handsome men, nor does she notice that Barbara has fallen in love with Jeff.

At the end of three weeks, the women are in trouble because they need $150 to pay their hotel bill, but Susan borrows the money from Jack, who has proposed to her. Realizing that she needs to get one of the men to propose to her that evening, Kay brings Barbara along to a dance to keep one of them occupied. Kay gets Barbara to dance with Jeff while she talks with Phil, with whom she has fallen in love.

Phil admits to her that he is broke, and that the O'Neil Mines will not be profitable again for at least five years. Kay confesses that she, too, came to Miami to find a rich spouse, and the pair reluctantly agrees to pursue other partners. Phil tells Jeff that Kay loves him, after which she accepts Jeff's proposal.

As the women are packing to leave for Jeff's father's island, however, Jack overhears them talking about their scheme and threatens to tell Jeff. After locking Jack in the bathroom, the women leave for the island, where they meet William, Jeff's businessman father. Desperate to see Kay again, Phil goes to the island and volunteers to be Jeff's best man. The women are also stunned by the arrival of Jack, who threatens to tell all if he determines that Kay does not really love Jeff.

On the night of a party that Jeff is throwing for Kay, Barbara encourages Jeff to accept a challenging job in South America to escape from under his father's shadow, while Phil admits to Kay that he loves her. As Phil is trying to persuade Kay that they belong together no matter what, Jeff enters the room. Phil and Kay explain that they are going to get married, and Jeff acknowledges that he has loved Barbara all along and will marry her.

Soon all ends well, as Susan and Jack also come to a romantic conclusion, and the three couples begin their lives together.

== Cast ==
- Betty Grable as Kathryn 'Kay' Latimer, "Miss Adams"
- Don Ameche as Phil O'Neil
- Robert Cummings as Jeffrey Bolton II
- Carole Landis as Barbara Latimer, "Miss Sears"
- Jack Haley as Jack O'Hara
- Charlotte Greenwood as Aunt Susan Latimer
- Cobina Wright Jr. as Connie Fentress
- Lynne Roberts as Jennie May
- Robert Conway as Mr. Lester
- George Lessey as William
- Condos Brothers as Themselves
- Robert Greig as Brearley
- Minor Watson as Reynolds
- Fortunio Bonanova as Mr. Pretto
- George Humbert as Proprietor
- Spencer Charters as Postman
- Dorothy Dearing as Miss Martha Winton
- Leyland Hodgson as Victor, the Headwaiter
- Gino Corrado as Boulton's Chef
- Russell Wade as Jeff's Friend
- Ethelreda Leopold as Nightclub Patron
- Monica Bannister as Partygoer

== Production ==
The film was originally called Miami, based on a novel by Stephen Powy. In May 1941, the title was changed to Moon Over Miami.

In December 1940, Walter Lang was assigned to direct. Betty Grable was set as star and George Seaton was finishing the script. In January it was announced Jack Haley and Charlotte Greenwood would join the film. Shortly afterwards Don Ameche, Robert Cummings and Carole Landis were cast. (Cummings was borrowed from Universal.)

Filming was to have started on January 20, 1941. However filming was pushed back to enable Cummings to finish The Devil and Miss Jones and for Ameche to complete Kiss the Boys Goodbye. Cobina Wright Jr replaced Lynn Bari who went into Sun Valley Serenade.

== Accolades ==
The film is recognized by American Film Institute:

- 2006: AFI's Greatest Movie Musicals – nominated

== Bibliography ==
- Fetrow, Alan G. Feature Films, 1940–1949: a United States Filmography. McFarland, 1994.
- Goble, Alan. The Complete Index to Literary Sources in Film. Walter de Gruyter, 1999.
