= Three Blind Mice (1938 film) =

1938 film by William A. Seiter

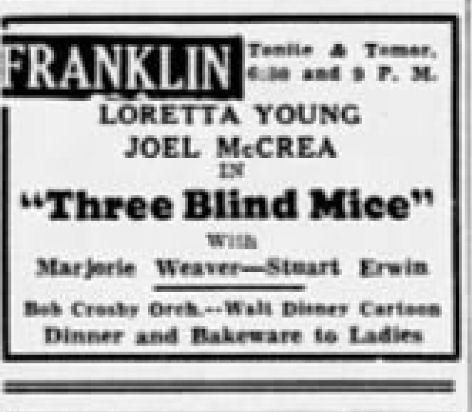
- Newspaper advertisement
- Directed by: William A. Seiter
- Screenplay by: Brown Holmes; Lynn Starling
- Based on: Three Blind Mice by Stephen Powys
- Produced by: Raymond Griffith; Darryl F. Zanuck (uncredited)
- Starring: Loretta Young; Joel McCrea; David Niven
- Cinematography: Ernest Palmer
- Edited by: James B. Morley
- Music by: Charles Maxwell
- Production company: 20th Century Fox
- Distributed by: 20th Century Fox
- Release date: June 18, 1938
- Running time: 75 minutes
- Country: United States
- Language: English

Three Blind Mice is a 1938 American romantic comedy film directed by William A. Seiter and starring Loretta Young, Joel McCrea, and David Niven. It was based on a play by Stephen Powys.

The second version was a 1941 film directed by Walter Lang titled Moon Over Miami, starring Betty Grable, Don Ameche and Robert Cummings.

== Plot ==
Three Kansas sisters, owners of a chicken farm, dream of a different life. Pamela pretends to be a rich lady, Moira her personal maid and Elizabeth her personal secretary. When they inherit $5872, Pam decides to head to California in search of a rich husband, which will make it much easier for her sisters to do the same. Moira and Liz do not like the idea, but Pam talks them into it.

When they check into a Santa Barbara hotel under their rehearsed roles, Steve Harrington, who is taking a call at the front desk, is enchanted, but Pam thinks he is a gold digger, so she gives him a chilly reception. Later, Mike Brophy, a hotel waiter, proves most informative about who is wealthy and who is not. Steve is. When Pam causes a boating accident, Steve is knocked into the water. She jumps in and pretends to be drowning, but discovers that he is in trouble himself, so she rescues him, punching him when he struggles too much. They are observed by an amused Van Dam Smith, another very rich young man. It turns out that Steve can swim; he just had trouble taking off his boots. Soon Pam has not one but two suitors. However, the money runs out, and the sisters cannot even pay their hotel bill in full. Pam pressures Moira into borrowing $100 from Mike under false pretenses.

Fortunately, Van proposes. Pam accepts and confesses everything to him. He then informs her that he is deeply in debt. His rich grandfather left all his millions in trust for his zoos and animals. She still wants to marry him, but he insists that Steve is the husband for her. He then tells Steve that he is leaving town. Steve wastes no time in proposing to Pam; she accepts. Unfortunately, when she tells Moira the news, Mike overhears everything. Disgusted, he decides to tell Steve, but the women manage to lock him in the bathroom. They quickly pack and leave for Steve's California ranch.

Steve warns them that he has an odd but well-meaning sister, Miriam. Miriam insists they go to a nightclub to celebrate. There she picks up Van Dam Smith at the bar. When she discovers that the others already know Van, she insists he stay at their place and be best man at the wedding, much to Pam's discomfort.

Meantime Mike has followed the women and has been hired as a "personal bartender" by Miriam. When they are alone, Mike tells Pam that he will put her "on probation" and that whether or not he tells Steve depends on how she behaves; he also confesses to loving Moira. Eventually, Van can stand it no longer. He tells Pam that her wedding cannot go on. Pam weakens and they embrace. Steve comes in at this point. After Pam tells him everything about herself and her sisters, Steve realizes he has fallen in love with Elizabeth. She accepts his proposal. Then they learn that Mike married Moira the day before, and that he is wealthy too, with a 100,000 acre ranch in Montana and 15,000 head of cattle. At the end, Pamela explains to Van that "it's just that easy to fall in love with a poor man as a rich one" - the opposite of what she said to her sisters at the beginning.

== Cast ==
- Loretta Young as Pamela Charters
- Joel McCrea as Van Dam Smith
- David Niven as Steve Harrington
- Stuart Erwin as Mike Brophy
- Marjorie Weaver as Moira Charters
- Pauline Moore as Elizabeth Charters
- Binnie Barnes as Miriam
- Jane Darwell as Mrs. Kilian
- Leonid Kinskey as Young Man
- Spencer Charters as Hendricks
- Franklin Pangborn as Clerk
- Herbert Heywood as Workman
- Elisha Cook Jr. as Boy on Bench (uncredited)
