= Kevin O'Morrison =

American dramatist

- Born: May 25, 1916
- Died: December 11, 2016 (aged 100); Lynnwood, Washington, United States
- Occupation: Actor
- Spouse: Linda

Kevin O'Morrison (May 25, 1916 – December 11, 2016) was an American playwright and actor.

== Early years ==
Born in St. Louis, O'Morrison graduated from Illinois Military School when he was 14 years old, and he began working then. The jobs that he held included copy reader, display designer, lumberjack, office boy, stevedore, and truck driver. His work as an usher at the St. Louis Theater provided an entry to working in vaudeville.

== Career ==
Beginning in 1937, O'Morrison performed with the Mercury Theatre in New York. Plays in which he appeared included Danton's Death, Julius Caesar, and Shoemaker's Holiday. During three years' military service in World War 2, O'Morrison had a lead role in the play Winged Victory. In addition to touring with that production he performed in the film adaptation.

O'Morrison played the lead actor in the TV series Charlie Wild, Private Detective (1950–1951) for the first seven episodes. The series began on CBS Television, and then moved to ABC, and finally DuMont.

He started his career working as a stage, radio, television, and film actor in the 1940s. He began writing plays in the 1960s, including A Party For Lovers and The Long War. In 1993, O'Morrison played Cliff Reed in Sleepless in Seattle, starring Tom Hanks and Meg Ryan. Other films in which he acted included Dear Ruth, Never Fear, The Set-Up, and The Golden Gloves Story.

== Death ==
O'Morrison died on December 11, 2016, in Lynnwood, Washington, at the age of 100. He was survived by his wife, Linda.
