= Hot Water (novel) =

1932 novel by P. G. Wodehouse

- First edition (Canadian)
- Author: P. G. Wodehouse
- Language: English
- Genre: Comic novel
- Publisher: Herbert Jenkins (UK); Doubleday, Doran (US); McClelland & Stewart (CAN)
- Publication date: 17 August 1932
- Publication place: United Kingdom
- Media type: Print
- Pages: 312

Hot Water is a novel by P. G. Wodehouse, first published on 17 August 1932 in the United Kingdom by Herbert Jenkins, London, and on the same date in the United States by Doubleday, Doran, New York.

The novel had previously been serialised in the American magazine Collier's.

The story takes place at the Château Blissac, near the town of St Rocque in Brittany. Packy Franklyn, an American millionaire and sportsman, is engaged to Lady Beatrice Bracken and is staying in England. A chance meeting with the great Dry legislator Senator Ambrose Opal and the senator's daughter Jane Opal leads to Packy becoming involved in much mischief at St Rocque in France in order to recover a compromising letter.

== Plot ==
J. Wellington Gedge lives with his rich wife (who inherited a fortune from her first husband) at the Château Blissac, near St Rocque, Brittany. She insists that they live in France although he longs to return to his hometown, Glendale, California. Mrs Gedge is going on a short trip to London, but has invited some guests: the American Senator Opal and his daughter, and the Vicomte de Blissac. Mrs Gedge wants them to make Mr Gedge the American Ambassador to France, an idea which appalls Mr Gedge. At the nearby Hotel des Etrangers are two American criminals, confidence trickster Gordon "Oily" Carlisle and safe-blower "Soup" Slattery. Oily admits that he and his wife, "Gum-Shoe Gertie", had a falling-out a year earlier. Soup tries to rob Mr Gedge, but Gedge has no money. They bond over their losses in the stock market crash. Gedge mentions that he was rich when he married and gave his wife sixty thousand dollars' worth of jewels, which are usually kept in a safe. Soup plans to crack the safe, with Oily acting as the inside man (which they call "working the inside stand").

American millionaire Patrick "Packy" Franklyn is engaged to the beautiful but austere Lady Beatrice Bracken. He sees his old friend, the fun-loving Vicomte de Blissac. Beatrice wants Packy to befriend the intellectual novelist Blair Eggleston. She is going to see her family in the country and is certain that Packy would get into trouble or "hot water" of some kind if left to himself. Packy goes to a barbershop, but the staff are on strike. For fun, Packy acts as barber for Senator Ambrose Opal, famous for supporting Dry legislation far stricter than the Volstead Act. Packy does a bad job and flees from the angered senator. This upsets Jane, since now her father will be especially unreceptive to the news that she is engaged to the impecunious Blair Eggleston. Packy apologizes to Jane, and encourages Blair to approach Senator Opal, who assumes Blair is his new valet. Jane wants Blair to keep up the act and win the senator's favour. Senator Opal had accidentally addressed a letter meant for his bootlegger to Mrs Gedge, and she threatens to publicize it unless he makes Mr Gedge ambassador. The senator agrees to consent to Jane marrying whomever she likes if she can recover the letter. Packy charters a yacht and follows them to St Rocque to help Jane.

Soup, Packy, the Vicomte (in a parrot-like lizard costume), and Mr Gedge (dressed as an "Oriental potentate") enjoy St Rocque's annual fancy dress carnival, the Festival of the Saint. Packy helps Soup escape the police after a fight, and Soup offers to help him. Both the Vicomte and Mr Gedge get very drunk at the festival, and the next day, Packy, hoping to help Jane, lies to each man that he mortally injured the other in a brawl; each man agrees to avoid trouble by having Packy visit the Château pretending to be the Vicomte. Jane, disappointed in Blair for not helping her obtain the letter, is glad to see Packy. Senator Opal believes Packy is Jane's secret fiancé, and approves since Packy is a millionaire and former Yale football star. While locating the safe in Mrs Gedge's room, Senator Opal is spotted by Mrs Gedge's lady's maid Medway. He suspects Medway is a detective, and orders Blair to find out. Oily has befriended Mrs Gedge under the alias of the Duc de Pont-Andemer. Playing their roles, Packy and Oily feign speaking French to each other in front of Mrs Gedge's secretary, Miss Putnam. Oily recognizes Medway, who is actually Gertie.

Mrs Gedge returns and places her jewels and letter in her safe, but Soup refuses to rob the room while a woman is sleeping there. Packy claims he is a detective and gets Mrs Gedge to change rooms, though Miss Putnam, who is actually a detective hired by Mrs Gedge, knows Packy is lying. Blair, acting on Packy's advice, tells Medway he is a detective to see if she admits to being one, but this causes the thieves Medway and Oily (who have reconciled and plan to betray Soup) to tie him up and leave him in a boathouse for a while. Lady Beatrice appears, hears about Packy and Jane, and ends her engagement to Packy. Soup, who was forced by Senator Opal to sit on a window-sill for hours after being caught burgling, has misgivings about helping the senator but still decides to help Packy get the letter. The Vicomte and Mr Gedge see each other and happily get drunk again. Packy realises that he loves Jane but resolves to help her marry Blair anyway. Soup, Oily and Gertie, and Packy and Jane attempt to burgle the safe at about the same time. Gertie knocks out Soup and Oily manages to open the safe, but Kate Putnam shows up with a pistol. Oily and Gertie escape empty-handed. Packy eats the letter before Mrs Gedge can take it. Soup recognizes her as his old partner in crime, Julia. Packy uses this to blackmail Mrs Gedge into taking Mr Gedge back to Glendale, and finds Blair in the boathouse. Blair is finished with Jane's schemes and leaves her. Packy and Jane confess their feelings for each other. Soup, having made off with five pieces of jewellery from Mrs Gedge's safe, decides to retire and start a farm.

== Allusions to other novels ==
The book features Gordon "Oily" Carlisle and his wife Gertie, who appear again in the book Cocktail Time (1958), and Blair Eggleston, who also appears in "Jeeves and the Greasy Bird" (1965). The fictional French resort town of St Rocque appears again in French Leave (1956).

== Publication history ==
The novel was serialised in Collier's from 21 May to 6 August 1932, illustrated by Floyd M. Davis.

The book is dedicated "To Maureen O'Sullivan, with love from Ethel, Leonora, Miss Winks, John-John, and The Author". Maureen O'Sullivan was a friend of the Wodehouse family. (Ethel and Leonora were Wodehouse's wife and step-daughter respectively, while Miss Winks and John-John were both female Pekingese dogs, the latter of which belonged to O'Sullivan but was looked after by the Wodehouses.)

The first US edition included six illustrations by Rea Irvin.

== Adaptations ==
The novel was adapted for the stage by Wodehouse and his long-time collaborator Guy Bolton as The Inside Stand. The play opened at the Saville Theatre in London on 21 November 1935 and ran for 50 performances. Produced by Jack Waller and directed by Geoffrey Norman, the play starred Ralph Lynn and Olive Blakeney.
