= Wildroot Cream-Oil =

1940s-1960s American hair product

Wildroot Cream-Oil was a men's hair tonic sold in the United States from the 1940s to the 1960s by the Wildroot Hair Tonic Company based in Buffalo, New York.

== Background ==
The company first started selling Wildroot Hair Tonic in 1911. In the 1920s, the tonic was primarily marketed to women, with advertisements warning that bobbed hair and tight hats would cause baldness, unless they used the Wildroot product. Wildroot started marketing the product to men in the 1930s. In 1937, the company was scolded by the Federal Trade Commission for claiming that Wildroot Hair Tonic keeps the scalp "healthy", "penetrates" the sebaceous glands, cleans up dandruff "completely", and that the results were "guaranteed".

The company's original tonic was alcohol-based; alcohol became more scarce during World War II. In the early 40s, chemist Emanuel Gundlach invented a new alcohol-free formula. At first, Gundlach presented the Wildroot executives with a cream that came in a tube, but they rejected that formulation. Adding more water to the mix, the company bottled the product, and the new Wildroot Cream-Oil was a success. The product's main ingredient was lanolin, also known as wool grease, which is a wax secreted by the sebaceous glands of domestic sheep.

Wildroot Cream-Oil was first sold in 1943. In the 1950s, the product was associated with the greaser subculture, teenage boys who slicked their hair down into a ducktail style.

In 1951, the Wildroot Hair Tonic Company set up the Wildroot Foundation (now the Western New York Foundation), which provides funds for local organizations in Buffalo. The Wildroot company was sold to Colgate-Palmolive in 1959 for $10.5 million. A "Wildroot Hair Groom" is still being marketed today by the Oakhurst Company.

== Promotion ==
At the height of the product's popularity, the company's tagline- used extensively in print, radio and television, was that Wildroot Cream-Oil is "again and again, the choice of men who put good grooming first". In print ads, the company encouraged consumers to try "the Famous Finger Nail Test": "Scratch your head and see if you find dryness or loose, ugly dandruff. If so, you need the new Wildroot Cream-Oil formula."

The company's commercial jingle, "Wildroot Charlie", suggested:

Get Wildroot Cream Oil, Charlie
It keeps your hair in trim.
You see, it's nonalcoholic, Charlie;
It's made with soothin' lanolin...

Wildroot's many radio sponsorships included The Adventures of Sam Spade (1946–50). When Sam Spade star Howard Duff and creator Dashiell Hammett were listed in the anti-Communist tract Red Channels, Wildroot was unhappy with the names being associated with the show. Sam Spade was removed from the air in 1950, and replaced with a more Wildroot-friendly title, Charlie Wild, Private Detective, which ran from September 1950 to July 1951. Other radio sponsorships included The Woody Herman Show (1945–46), The King Cole Trio (1946–48), The FBI in Peace and War (1951–52), The Shadow (1952–53) and Twenty Questions (1952–53).

Television sponsorships included The Adventures of Robin Hood (1956) and Perry Mason.

In the 1950s, Al Capp's comic strip hero Fearless Fosdick (a spoof of Dick Tracy) endorsed Wildroot Cream-Oil in a popular series of print advertisements, presented in comic strip form. In the ads, Fosdick battled his nemesis Anyface, a murderous scoundrel who could mold his pliable face into any form of disguise. Fosdick always recognized the villain, however, because of his telltale dandruff. At the end of the ad, Fosdick encouraged readers to "Get Wildroot Cream-Oil, Charlie!" The character was also featured on promotional tin signs displayed at barber shops.
