= David Shelley =

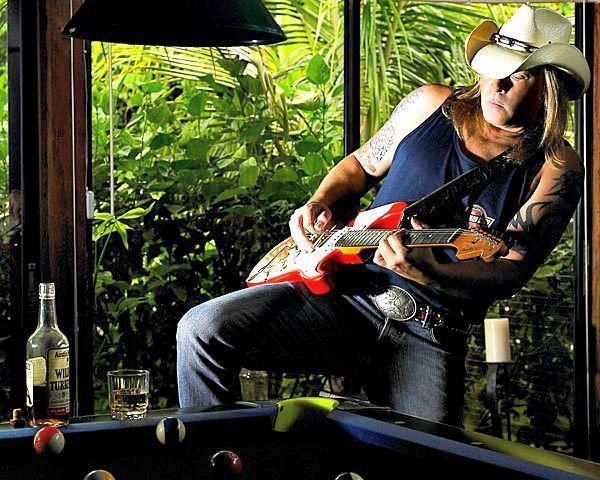

Background information
- Born: November 23, 1957; Santa Monica, California, U.S.
- Died: August 10, 2015 (aged 57) Fort Lauderdale, Florida, U.S.
- Genres: Blues rock, roots rock, Americana, Soul music, Reggae
- Occupations: Musician, songwriter
- Instruments: Vocals, guitar, drums, djembe
- Years active: 1979–2015
- Labels: MCA, Ocean Sound, Pink Buffalo Records
- Website: davidshelleymusic.com

David Joseph Shelley (November 23, 1957 – August 10, 2015) was an American blues rock musician who performed with Cher and released two critically acclaimed albums, That's My Train (2012) and Trick Bag (2013).

== Biography ==
=== Early years ===
David Shelley was born November 23, 1957, in Santa Monica, California. His grandfather Buddy DeSylva, along with Glenn Wallichs and Johnny Mercer, founded Capitol Records in 1942. DeSylva also was known for writing such standards as "California Here I Come" and "The Best Things in Life Are Free." Shelley's mother, actress and singer Martha Stewart, sang in big bands with Glenn Miller and Harry James and acted on Broadway and in films and TV, including In a Lonely Place (1950) starring Humphrey Bogart.

Shelley began playing drums in high school in Florida and eventually took up guitar under the guidance of his friend Jeff Savage in California, who turned Shelley onto the blues via an extensive record collection.

=== 1979: Ocean Sound ===
Returning to Florida in 1979, Shelley founded Ocean Sound Studio, a sixteen track recording facility, with childhood friend Michael Couzzi (who would go on to engineer hit albums like Santana's Supernatural). Shelley played percussion live and in the studio with jazz artist Randy Bernsen, legendary bassist Jaco Pastorius, other local artists and his first self-led band, instrumental funk group Captiva.

=== 1982: Ti'shan ===
In 1982, Shelley joined the reggae band Ti'shan as singer and guitarist. Ti'shan played original music, provided back-up for visiting reggae artists such as Barrington Levy and opened for The Clash. Shelley appeared on Ti'shan's 1982 LP Ti'shan Reggae Music and in videos for the band's songs.

=== 1984: The David Shelley Band ===
In 1984, he left Ti'shan to front his own band, Special Forces (eventually renamed The David Shelley Band), performing his original "power-dance-reggae" music. The David Shelley Band was a regional success, opening for Dennis Brown, The Kinks, Laura Branigan, Cheap Trick, Eddie Money, and among the headliners at Miami's Big Orange Festival.

In February 1984, Shelley recorded a three-song demo at Criteria Studios in Miami, produced by Ron and Howard Albert, best known for producing Stephen Stills' albums. Two more songs followed in October, recorded at New River Studios in Fort Lauderdale with producer Alan Blazak, who had recently hit with Glenn Frey's The Allnighter.

Shelley's then manager Arnie Wohl pressed the five songs on a 12" EP that was distributed to regional record stores. Radio station WSHE (FM 103.5) added one of the songs, "She's Only Rock `n` Roll", to its playlist and adopted it as a theme song. Major label MCA Records showed interest and financed Shelley to record three more demo songs with Mike Couzzi and producer-writer Doug Shawe.

=== 1985: MCA ===
Shelley moved to Los Angeles anticipating a deal and eventually signed with MCA in October 1985. For his major label debut, Shelley worked with co-producers Gary Goetzman and Mike Picarillo. Talking Heads member Jerry Harrison played keyboard on Shelley's song "Battle of the Sexes".

An album's worth of material was recorded, but upheaval at the label from MCA's involvement in the "indie" payola scandal of 1986, caused the record to be shelved and Shelley was dropped from the roster.

=== 1988: And God Created Woman ===
Shelley continued to seek a record deal, performing at rock clubs in Los Angeles with his band Ku De Tah (which included Colvin Fields from Ti'shan and The David Shelley Band) and various recording sessions, including singing on Richard Marx's hit debut album Richard Marx.

When producer Goetzman got Shelley's songs chosen for Roger Vadim's And God Created Woman, (remake-in-name-only of the director's 1956 film with Brigitte Bardot), Shelley was cast to act as a rock band member in the movie, performing his own music, credited as "Dave Shelley".

=== 1988: Cher, Heart of Stone ===
Shelley's appearance in And God Created Woman caught the eye of casting directors and he was hired to portray a guitar player in the video for "You Wouldn't Know Love" from Cher's Heart of Stone album. He performed with Cher at the 1988 MTV Video Music Awards and in the controversial video for the song "If I Could Turn Back Time".

Shelley became a member of Cher's backup band (which included Darlene Love) for the Heart of Stone Tour, performing in the US, Canada, England, Ireland and Australia and appeared with Cher on the 1989 MTV Video Music Awards and Cher Extravaganza: Live at The Mirage (1992).

=== 1991: The Ron Reagan Show ===
In 1991, Shelley joined the live studio band for The Ron Reagan Show, a syndicated late-night talk show addressing political issues of the day hosted by Ron Reagan, son of President Ronald Reagan. Led by D.A. Young who had played with Shelley in Ku De Tah, the band was called D.A. and Dr. Bombay and included Hawk Lopez, musician/actor who had joined Shelley in the Vadim film. The music was all instrumental.

The program was canceled after a brief run, unable to compete with the higher ratings of The Arsenio Hall Show, The Tonight Show Starring Johnny Carson, and Nightline. Reagan has said that Shelley and the band were "the one undeniably wonderful aspect" of the show.

=== 1993: Seventh Son/Mud Ponies ===
In the early 1990s, Shelley began jamming with drummer and painter Darren Vigil Gray in Santa Fe, New Mexico. With longtime friend Michael Tovar and Ray Rodriguez from Food For Feet (East LA band formed with Oingo Boingo's John Avila) and bassist Charles Gasper, they formed Seventh Son (named after the Willie Dixon song) and began performing live in 1995.

Featuring Native American musicians (Vigil Gray being Jicarilla Apache/Kiowa Apache, Gasper Zuni Pueblo, additional singer Canadian-born vocalist Star Nayea Ojibwe), Seventh Son played events such as Redstock and annually at Santa Fe's Indian Market, eventually taking over the name of Vigil Gray's previous band, The Mud Ponies (from the Pawnee legend). Their music has been described as "high-energy blues" and "world beat with an edge".

=== 1996: Los Angeles-Florida blues ===
By 1996, Shelley was living between Los Angeles and Florida with stays in Santa Fe working with The Mud Ponies. The band had a month-long engagement as Seventh Son in Helsinki, Finland, with Hawk Lopez replacing Vigil Gray on drums.

In Los Angeles, Shelley and Tovar played around town with Blues Farm, a band including Jimmy Griego (from Bobby Kimball of Toto's band) and recorded a demo tape of original Shelley tunes. Among the guest artists often sitting in with the band was guitarist Coco Montoya, who encouraged Shelley to pursue a blues music career.

In South Florida, Shelley began reintroducing himself to the scene as a blues artist, performing with Shack Daddys, The Weld and other players.

Shelley also played with a country and western band in Nashville and got bit parts in the movies Basquiat (1996) and New Rose Hotel (1998) starring Christopher Walken.

=== 2000: Chief Jim Billie ===
In 2000, Shelley joined the backing band for Native American singer/songwriter Chief Jim Billie, Tribal Chairman of the Florida Seminole. This group included drummer Jeff Renza from The David Shelley Band and performed select dates around the state and across Indian country.

=== 2002: Alligator Alley Allstars ===
In 2002, Shelley took up residence in the Alligator Alley Allstars, a "blues and roots super group" at Alligator Alley, a "Native Florida" restaurant and live music venue (named for nearby swamp highway) that teamed the musician with players such as Albert Castiglia.

=== 2003: David Shelley and Bluestone ===
Shelley began performing under his own name, for the first time since the 1980s, as David Shelley and Bluestone. Playing around South Florida most often as a two guitar, bass and drums quartet with occasional fifth piece, band members included Billy Vazquez and JP Soars on guitar; Jason Rosner, Alaina Reed and "Kilmo" Carl Pacillo on bass; Jeff Renza, Goetz Kujack, John Yarling and Raul Hernandez on drums; Bob Taylor and Dean Sire on keyboards; Kellie Rucker on harmonica, among others.

In 2003, David Shelley & Bluestone was voted by the South Florida Blues Society (SFBS) to perform at the Riverwalk Blues & Music Festival in Fort Lauderdale.

In 2007, David Shelley & Bluestone was chosen to represent SFBS at the Blues Foundation's International Blues Challenge in Memphis, Tennessee, where the band was a top 10 finalist.

In 2008, Shelley put out a promotional CD of live recordings made during the band's long-running residency at Fort Lauderdale jazz and blues cafe O'Hara's.

In 2010, Charles Gasper from the Mud Ponies relocated to South Florida to play bass in Bluestone. In April, David Shelley & Bluestone won the SunFest Rock n' Roll Shootout, a four-week battle of the bands competition that awarded the band opening slot for the Charlie Daniels Band at downtown West Palm Beach's annual SunFest.

In June, 2011, David Shelley & Bluestone performed at Festival International de Jazz de Montréal with Michael Tovar from Blues Farm on lead guitar.

Dave Scott, from the South Florida 1980s band Tuff Luck (subject of 2015 documentary), joined Bluestone as lead guitarist. The band gained popularity and was able to raise funds from fans and supporters to record Shelley's first CD release.

=== 2011: That's My Train and Trick Bag ===
In August, 2011, Shelley released That's My Train by David Shelley & Bluestone on his own label, Pink Buffalo. The self-produced 10 track album featured all original songs by Shelley and his long time co-writer Vincent Noonan. Anchored by Scott, Gasper and drummer John Yarling with D.A. Young from Shelley's earliest Los Angeles bands on keyboards, the recording included contributions from Tovar, Soars and others. In October, the band performed at the Daytona Blues Festival. Randy Ridenour began to play with Bluestone as drummer.

In 2012, David Shelley & Bluestone continued to play more venues and events, including a tour to Colorado.

In June, 2013, he released David Shelley and Bluestone's second album Trick Bag on Pink Buffalo Records. Produced by Shelley and Paul Trust, the 11 song collection featured all original songs plus Shelley's reworking of his grandfather's composition, "Birth of The Blues".

"Too Far Gone", a shuffling blues remake on That's My Train of Shelley's showcase reggae rocker from And God Created Woman had caught the ear of beach music programmers and was charting. The Rhythm & Blues DJ Association added the track to their Coast to Coast - The Music Lives On sampler. Other tracks from both Bluestone releases began receiving airplay in Europe and Australia.

In August David Shelley and Bluestone toured Montana. In September, the band won the chance to represent SFBS again at the upcoming IBC in Memphis. In November, Shelley performed at the Festival Internacional de Jazz in San Miguel de Allende, Mexico, with Randy Bernsen.

In January, 2014, David Shelley and Bluestone competed in the 30th Annual International Blues Challenge in Memphis and made it to the semi-finals. Rave reviews of the band's performances at this and other events plus increased rotation of That's My Train and Trick Bag brought attention to Shelley's music and a European label offered the artist a record deal. One hour after receiving the offer, Shelley found out he had cancer.

=== Illness and death ===
In February, 2014, Shelley had surgery to remove the cancer and he undertook a strict regimen of treatment. By March he had recovered enough to resume performing with Bluestone, often with Jimmy Powers, Billy Vazquez or Drew Preston on guitar. In addition to packing South Florida venues as the main attraction, Shelley hosted open jams, participated in benefits for others, produced recording sessions and cut tracks with friends during this time.

In August, the band appeared at the Trois-Rivieres en Blues Fest in Quebec, Canada and in October, Shelley joined Warren Haynes and Gov't Mule on stage during their Miami concert encore. David Shelley and Bluestone was nominated for the 2014 British Blues Awards as Best Overseas Artist. Although the label's offer had been rescinded, a tour of Europe (where travelling artist Albert Castiglia related there was a demand for Shelley) was being booked for May 2015, but in January, Shelley's cancer was found to have returned.

David Shelley and Bluestone performed on January 15, 2015, at The Funky Biscuit in Boca Raton, Florida. It would be their last show together. Fans wore shirts with the "S" logo of Superman to show support for the artist, referencing the Shelley-Noonan song "When I Was Your Superman" from Trick Bag. Bluestone would fulfill a few remaining dates with Jeffrey James Harris on vocals and guitar.

Shelley went to California and began treatment in February. A GoFundMe page was set-up to help with Shelley's medical expenses and raised over $30,000 in a few days. Shelley returned to home hospice care in Florida where he died August 10, 2015. On Sunday, August 23, 2015, David Shelley's ashes were spread on the ocean off Fort Lauderdale beach, attended by a paddle out memorial for the surfer by his family, friends and fans.

=== Personal life ===
David Shelley is survived by a daughter, Daylin, and by his mother, actress Martha Stewart (1922-2021).

== Impact ==
=== on the South Florida sound of the 1980s ===
Shelley was a leading exponent of South Florida artists in the 1980s who "incorporated South Florida's ethnic and cultural mix into their original music, blending rock with reggae, calypso, funk, salsa and/or jazz".

Though South Florida original music bands play every kind of music, there also is a South Florida sound of sorts, discernible in much of the original music. Some of the bands have names for it: sugarcane soul, tropa-rock, apocalypso, Floribbean pop, reggae-rock.

— Scott Benarde, South Florida bands flounder for a foothold, Sun-Sentinel, July 11, 1986

Shelley achieved the most visibility for the sound, opening for major artists, getting radio airplay and eventually signing with a major record label. Performing his original music in the movie And God Created Woman, Shelley brought South Florida reggae-rock to its widest audience. Years later it would be noted that Shelley's "unconventional blues style pulls from his reggae-playing past."

The Fort Lauderdale-based guitarist and singer...makes no apologies for infusing old-time blues with Caribbean soul, early ‘70s rock and jam-band vibes. "I never set out to be a traditional blues guy," he explained. "It wouldn't be natural for me. I have to be true to who I am."

— Beth Feinstein-Bartl, Sun-Sentinel, April 30, 2010

=== on Native American music community ===
Shelley began performing with Native American musicians after meeting noted artist and musician Darren Vigil Gray in the 1980s. Their band Seventh Son (later named The Mud Ponies) included members of the Kiowa Apache, Zuni Pueblo and Ojibwe nations. Seventh Son/Mud Ponies played at Indian events around the Southwest where Shelley performed with such artists as John Trudell, Keith Secola, Floyd Redcrow Westerman and the late Jesse Ed Davis.

Shelley produced and co-wrote Ojibwe vocalist Star Nayea's Somewhere in a Dream album, which won the 2001 Native American Music Award for Best Independent Recording. Three of its songs topped the Southwestern radio charts at #1 for several weeks.

After joining Florida Seminole singer/songwriter Chief Jim Billie's backing band in 2000, Shelley performed at pow wows and festivals around the country and gained even more exposure to the Native American music scene. He continued supporting Native American artists, producing singer Paula Bowers and teenage Seminole blues rock trio The Osceola Brothers, who often covered his songs in their live shows.

Shelley used his own work to promote Native American art. "War Party" on Trick Bag was co-written with Hunkpapa Lakota spirit singer Delbert "Black Fox" Pomani, a respected member of the Native American Church who gave Shelley the name "Pink Buffalo".

=== on other musicians ===
Pat Monahan, lead singer of the band Train has often cited a meeting with David Shelley as the beginning of his career:

Monahan, who grew up dreaming of California and making it in music, was, by twenty, the star of Erie's best covers act. "We played a show once, and David Shelley from Cher's band saw me singing, gave me his number and told me that I might be able to make it if I went to L.A.," he says. "I've never seen him again, but that guy telling me to go did it." Monahan, his band and his then-girlfriend (now his wife) made the cross-country move...

— Rolling Stone, March 28, 2002

(Monahan eventually met Shelley again in 2010 at a Train concert in Florida.)

== Discography ==
David Shelley and Bluestone

- Trick Bag (2013)
- That's My Train (2012)
- Live at O'Hara's (2008)

David Shelley

- I Want To (Do Everything For You) (2015)

Dave Shelley

- And God Created Woman (1988)

David Shelley Band

- David Shelley Band (1984)

with Ti'shan

- Ti'shan Reggae Music (1982)

with other artists

- Bonefish Johnny - Sings The Blues (2016)
- Alflen & Fest - Fusion You Can Feel (2014)
- JP Soars - More Bees with Honey (2011)
- Gale Trippsmith - Chasing the Rabbit (2006)
- Spirit Jam - The Stranger Within (2001)
- Raiford Starke - Speak Me (1999)
- Cher - Cher Extravaganza: Live at the Mirage (1992)
- Richard Marx - Richard Marx (1987)
- Trog & Woody - Hey Dude, Let's Party (1986)
- Randy Bernsen – Music For Planets, People & Washing Machines (1985)

As producer, songwriter

- JL Fulks - Heading Back to Memphis (2015)
- Nico Wayne Toussaint – Lonely Number (2011)
- Fiore - Kiss Me (2009)
- Star Nayea - Somewhere In A Dream (2001)

Compilations

- Coast to Coast - The Music Lives On (2013)
- Showcasing the Blues, Vol. 3 (2012)

== Filmography ==
- New Rose Hotel (1998)
- Basquiat (1996)
- Cher: Extravaganza - Live at the Mirage (1992)
- And God Created Woman (1988)
