= Dig You Later (A Hubba-Hubba-Hubba) =

1945 hit song by Perry Como

Single by Perry Como and the Satisfiers featuring Russ Case and His Orchestra
- B-side: "Here Comes Heaven Again"
- Released: November 1945
- Genre: Swing music
- Length: 3:03
- Label: Victor
- Songwriter(s): Harold Adamson; Jimmy McHugh

Perry Como singles chronology
"Till the End of Time" (1945)	"Dig You Later (A Hubba-Hubba-Hubba)" (1945)	"I'm Always Chasing Rainbows" (1946)

"Dig You Later (A Hubba-Hubba-Hubba)" is a song from the 1945 American film Doll Face. It was written by Harold Adamson and Jimmy McHugh, and made popular by Perry Como and the Satisfiers featuring Russ Case and His Orchestra.

== Lyrics and composition ==
The 3-minute-3-second song is in the key of C sharp / D flat major, with a tempo of 158 beats per minute.

"Dig You Later" is a novelty song about post-war optimism and romance. In the context of Doll Face, the song's lyrics describe Como's character Nicky having returned to his home from Tokyo and telling his child "what happened to the Japanese". In another part of the song, he and Frankie (Martha Stewart's character) are flirting with each other. The song makes excessive use of the phrase "A hubba-hubba-hubba", and much of the other lyrics also consist of lyrical nonsense.

== Reception and chart performance ==
"Dig You Later" charted on Billboard's Best Sellers in Stores list for 12 weeks, peaking at number 3. It was also ranked by the magazine as the 37th best selling song of 1946.

Maurie Orodenker called the song "clever, toe-tapping doggerel" "sung in the free and easy rhythmic manner" and "a cinch to reap a fine collection of coins in jukes", "destined to make itself felt in popularity song circles". Another Billboard writer states the song "gives Perry Como something to wrap his tonsils around, and he Como's it in a big way."

According to legal records, Irving Weissman filed suit against the studio, claiming that the song was plagiarized from one of his compositions. The case was dismissed in September 1948 by a federal court judge, but Weissman again filed suit through a state court. The disposition of the second suit has not been determined.
