= Charles Tannen =

American actor (1915–1980)

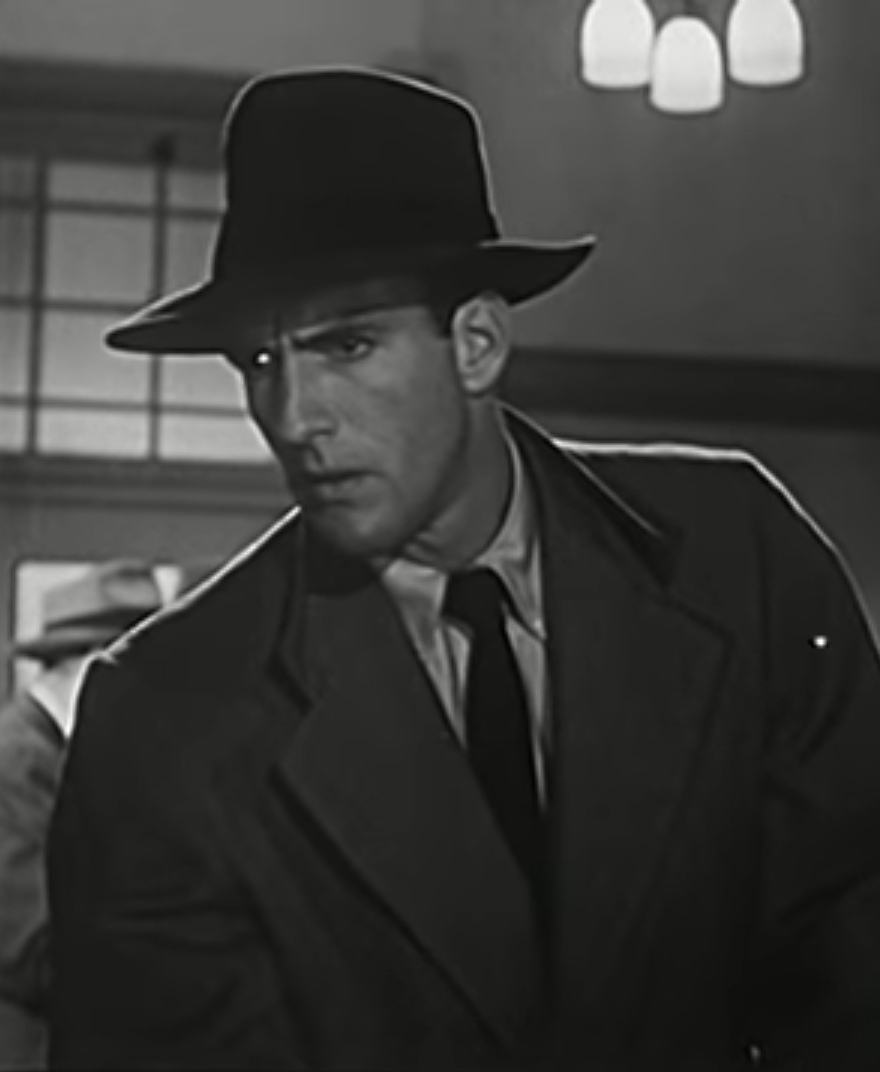
- Tannen in Behind Green Lights (1946)
- Born: Charles David Tannen; October 22, 1915; New York City, U.S.
- Died: December 18, 1980 (aged 65); San Bernardino, California, U.S.
- Occupations: Actor; television screenwriter
- Years active: 1935–1976
- Spouse: Joan Myrtland (Robertson) Tannen
- Children: 1
- Father: Julius Tannen
- Relatives: William Tannen (brother)

Charles David Tannen (October 22, 1915 – December 28, 1980) was an American actor and screenwriter.

== Career ==
A general purpose actor who worked primarily at 20th Century Fox, Tannen had mostly bit and/or supporting parts in movies, appearing in more than two hundred films, including Jesse James (1939), The Return of Frank James (1940), Gentlemen Prefer Blondes (1953) with Marilyn Monroe, There's No Business Like Show Business (1954), The Fly (1958), and Voyage to the Bottom of the Sea (1961).

The director Preston Sturges once praised Tannen for his acting ability, being quoted as saying,

If you have a middle-aged character part, either Gentile or Jewish, either comic or dramatic, I urge you to give it to Tannen, and I guarantee that you will be enchanted by his authority, his unction, his voice, his theatrical resource, and his profound ability.

Tannen also made many appearances on such television series as Bonanza, Gunsmoke, Perry Mason, Lassie, The Twilight Zone, Rawhide, The Rifleman, and Jefferson Drum. In 1957 Tannen appeared as Lonnie the Conductor in the TV western Cheyenne in the episode "The Iron Trail."

As a television screenwriter, Tannen wrote episodes for Petticoat Junction, I Dream Of Jeannie, Gilligan's Island, The Brady Bunch, All In The Family, and Maude.

== Personal life and death ==
Tannen's father, Julius Tannen, and his brother, William Tannen, were also actors.

Tannen died in 1980 in San Bernardino, California at the age of 65 of a heart attack.

== Selected filmography ==
- The Dark Angel (1935) – Man in Dormitory (uncredited)
- Fighting Youth (1935) – Radical Student (uncredited)
- Blazing Justice (1936) – Jones, Bank Clerk (uncredited)
- Love Before Breakfast (1936) – Clerk (uncredited)
- Educating Father (1936) – Jim Courtney
- Sins of Man (1936) – Steamship Clerk (uncredited)
- Sing, Baby, Sing (1936) – Reporter / Radio Station Messenger (uncredited)
- Dimples (1936) – Box Office Man (uncredited)
- Love Is News (1937) – Reporter (uncredited)
- Fair Warning (1937) – Bellhop (uncredited)
- Sing and Be Happy (1937) – Clerk (uncredited)
- Wake Up and Live (1937) – Agent (uncredited)
- The Lady Escapes (1937) – Usher (uncredited)
- Think Fast, Mr. Moto (1937) – One of Bob's Friends (uncredited)
- Second Honeymoon (1937) – Reporter (uncredited)
- Big Town Girl (1937) – Radio Station Attendant (uncredited)
- Love and Hisses (1937) – Hotel Desk Clerk (uncredited)
- Happy Landing (1938) – Newspaper Reporter (uncredited)
- Walking Down Broadway (1938) – Hotel Clerk (uncredited)
- Kentucky Moonshine (1938) – Engineer (uncredited)
- Alexander's Ragtime Band (1938) – Dillingham's Secretary (uncredited)
- Always Goodbye (1938) – Hospital Interne (uncredited)
- I'll Give a Million (1938) – Radio Operator (uncredited)
- Gateway (1938) – Reporter (uncredited)
- My Lucky Star (1938) – Saier
- Five of a Kind (1938) – Reporter (uncredited)
- Submarine Patrol (1938) – Kelly (uncredited)
- Up the River (1938) – Trustie (uncredited)
- Jesse James (1939) – Charles Ford
- The Story of Alexander Graham Bell (1939) – Court Clerk (uncredited)
- The Return of the Cisco Kid (1939) – Clark – Bank Teller (uncredited)
- Rose of Washington Square (1939) – Newspaper Reporter (uncredited)
- Young Mr. Lincoln (1939) – Ninian Edwards (uncredited)
- The Jones Family in Hollywood (1939)
- Second Fiddle (1939) – Assistant Director (uncredited)
- Charlie Chan at Treasure Island (1939) – Plane Passenger (uncredited)
- Drums Along the Mohawk (1939) – Dr. Robert Johnson
- Barricade (1939) – Opening Narrator (voice, uncredited)
- The Honeymoon's Over (1939) – Newsreel Man (uncredited)
- Swanee River (1939) – Morrison Foster
- The Man Who Wouldn't Talk (1940) – Reporter (uncredited)
- The Grapes of Wrath (1940) – Joe
- Johnny Apollo (1940) – Reporter (uncredited)
- Star Dust (1940) – Desk Clerk at Hotel Roosevelt (uncredited)
- Lillian Russell (1940) – Reporter (uncredited)
- Lucky Cisco Kid (1940) – Minor Role (uncredited)
- Sailor's Lady (1940) – Sailor (uncredited)
- The Return of Frank James (1940) – Charlie Ford
- Young People (1940) – Assistant Manager (uncredited)
- Public Deb No. 1 (1940) – Reporter (uncredited)
- Murder Over New York (1940) – Radio Announcer (voice, uncredited)
- Jennie (1940) – Minor Role (uncredited)
- Tall, Dark and Handsome (1941) – Reporter (uncredited)
- Sleepers West (1941) – Ambulance Attendant (uncredited)
- Dead Men Tell (1941) – Sailor with Girl (uncredited)
- The Great American Broadcast (1941) – Usher (uncredited)
- The Cowboy and the Blonde (1941) – Assistant Director (uncredited)
- Moon Over Miami (1941) – Third Customer at Texas Tommy's (uncredited)
- Dive Bomber (1941) – Pilot (uncredited)
- Great Guns (1941) – Lieutenant (uncredited)
- Cadet Girl (1941) – Jimmy, a Cadet
- Marry the Boss's Daughter (1941) – Chauffeur Benton (uncredited)
- The Perfect Snob (1941) – Chauffeur (uncredited)
- Remember the Day (1941) – Slicker (uncredited)
- Blue, White and Perfect (1942) – Ship's Ticket Agent (uncredited)
- To the Shores of Tripoli (1942) – Swifty (uncredited)
- Sundown Jim (1942) – Dan Barr
- Moontide (1942) – Radio Broadcaster (voice, uncredited)
- My Gal Sal (1942) – Hotel Clerk (uncredited)
- The Magnificent Dope (1942) – Elevator Operator (uncredited)
- Little Tokyo, U.S.A. (1942) – Marsten
- Footlight Serenade (1942) – Charlie, Stage manager
- Tales of Manhattan (1942) – Pilot (Robeson sequence) (uncredited)
- Careful, Soft Shoulder (1942) – Joe
- Just Off Broadway (1942) – Radio Broadcaster (uncredited)
- Manila Calling (1942) – Fillmore
- Thunder Birds (1942) – American Flyer / Opening Off-Screen Narrator (voice)
- Springtime in the Rockies (1942) – Backstage Call Boy (voice, uncredited)
- Life Begins at Eight-Thirty (1942) – Radio Announcer (voice, uncredited)
- Quiet Please, Murder (1942) – Hollis
- Crash Dive (1943) – Seaman Hammond (uncredited)
- They Came to Blow Up America (1943) – Smitty – Craig's Deputy (uncredited)
- December 7th: The Movie (1943) – Mike – Landing Field Officer (uncredited)
- Resisting Enemy Interrogation (1944) – Sgt. Freulich – German Prison Plant (uncredited)
- Land and Live in the Jungle (1944) – Himself (uncredited)
- Leave Her to Heaven (1945) – Man (uncredited)
- Doll Face (1945) – Flo's Aide
- The Spider (1945) – Det. Tonti
- Shock (1946) – Hotel Clerk (uncredited)
- Behind Green Lights (1946) – Ames – Reporter
- Johnny Comes Flying Home (1946) – Harry
- The Dark Corner (1946) – Second Cab Driver (uncredited)
- It Shouldn't Happen to a Dog (1946) – Glass (uncredited)
- If I'm Lucky (1946) – Secretary (scenes deleted)
- You Were Meant for Me (1948) – Harry Jarvis (uncredited)
- Sitting Pretty (1948) – Newsreel Director (uncredited)
- The Iron Curtain (1948) – Radio Commentator (voice, uncredited)
- Green Grass of Wyoming (1948) – Dr. Kimgrough – Veterinarian
- Give My Regards to Broadway (1948) – Insurance Agent (uncredited)
- The Street with No Name (1948) – Cab Driver (uncredited)
- Cry of the City (1948) – Intern (uncredited)
- Unfaithfully Yours (1948) – Airport Information Man (uncredited)
- When My Baby Smiles at Me (1948) – Intern (uncredited)
- That Wonderful Urge (1948) – Benny Johnson (uncredited)
- A Letter to Three Wives (1949) – Radio Announcer for 'Confessions of Brenda' (voice, uncredited)
- You're My Everything (1949) – Director (uncredited)
- Dancing in the Dark (1949) – Jack (uncredited)
- When Willie Comes Marching Home (1950) – Radio Announcer (voice, uncredited)
- Mother Didn't Tell Me (1950) – Anaesthetist (uncredited)
- Where the Sidewalk Ends (1950) – Police Radio Dispatcher #79 (voice, uncredited)
- I'll Get By (1950) – Director / Radio Announcer (uncredited)
- The Jackpot (1950) – Al Vogel (uncredited)
- Call Me Mister (1951) – Lieutenant (uncredited)
- You're in the Navy Now (1951) – Houlihan (uncredited)
- Follow the Sun (1951) – Golf Announcer (voice, uncredited)
- The Day the Earth Stood Still (1951) – Radio Announcer (voice, uncredited)
- Phone Call from a Stranger (1952) – Airport Intercom Announcer (voice, uncredited)
- Red Skies of Montana (1952) – Charlie (uncredited)
- Deadline – U.S.A. (1952) – Sports Reporter (uncredited)
- The Pride of St. Louis (1952) – Larry (uncredited)
- Without Warning! (1952) – Wolf
- Night Without Sleep (1952) – Steve Brooks (uncredited)
- Bloodhounds of Broadway (1952) – Bookie on Phone (uncredited)
- Angel Face (1953) – TV Broadcaster (scenes deleted)
- Down Among the Sheltering Palms (1953) – Radio Operator McGee (uncredited)
- Call Me Madam (1953) – Reporter (uncredited)
- The Girl Next Door (1953) – Reporter (uncredited)
- The Kid from Left Field (1953) – Fan (uncredited)
- Gentlemen Prefer Blondes (1953) – Ed – Malone's contact (uncredited)
- Vice Squad (1953) – Dutch (uncredited)
- Dangerous Crossing (1953) – Ship's Wine Steward (uncredited)
- A Blueprint for Murder (1953) – Detective (uncredited)
- Inferno (1953) – Police Radio Broadcaster (uncredited)
- City of Bad Men (1953) – Cashier (uncredited)
- Gorilla at Large (1954) – Owens (uncredited)
- Down Three Dark Streets (1954) – Masher in Car (uncredited)
- The Country Girl (1954) – First Photographer (uncredited)
- There's No Business Like Show Business (1954) – EmCee / Orchestra Leader (voice, uncredited)
- The Steel Cage (1954) – Convict Patient (segment "The Hostages")
- The Bridges at Toko-Ri (1954) – Military Police Major (uncredited)
- Daddy Long Legs (1955) – Man in White Suit, Ballet Nightmare Sequence (uncredited)
- The Girl in the Red Velvet Swing (1955) – Court Clerk (uncredited)
- Trial (1955) – Bailiff (uncredited)
- I'll Cry Tomorrow (1955) – Audition Stage Manager (uncredited)
- The Benny Goodman Story (1956) – Mr. Stewart – Manager of Palomar Ballroom (uncredited)
- The Harder They Fall (1956) – Reporter (uncredited)
- The Proud Ones (1956) – 2nd Foreman (uncredited)
- The First Traveling Saleslady (1956) – Buyer (uncredited)
- These Wilder Years (1956) – Loafer (uncredited)
- The Rack (1956) – Ambulance Attendant at Airport (uncredited)
- Four Girls in Town (1957) – Hotel Manager (uncredited)
- The Monster That Challenged the World (1957) – Radioman Wyatt (uncredited)
- Official Detective (1957, TV series Episode: "The Brunette") – Ballanger
- I Married a Woman (1958) – Young Cop (uncredited)
- The Return of Dracula (1958) – Mack Bryant, Dept. of Immigration (uncredited)
- The Fly (1958) – Doctor (uncredited)
- A Nice Little Bank That Should Be Robbed (1958) – Charlie – Walkie Talkie Policeman (uncredited)
- Rally 'Round the Flag, Boys! (1958) – TV Director (uncredited)
- The Wild and the Innocent (1959) – Bit Role (uncredited)
- But Not for Me (1959) – Caldwell – Theatre Manager (uncredited)
- Beloved Infidel (1959) – Radio Director (uncredited)
- The Rookie (1959) – Arnold – Bartender / Waiter (uncredited)
- The Gene Krupa Story (1959) – Kenny Lemay (uncredited)
- Ma Barker's Killer Brood (1960) – Sheriff #1
- Voyage to the Bottom of the Sea (1961) – CPO Gleason
- Stagecoach to Dancers' Rock (1962) – Sheriff
- Kisses for My President (1964) – TV Crew Director (voice, uncredited)

== Television ==
Year	Title	Role	Notes
1959	Rawhide	Jed Hodges	S2:E6, "Incident of the 13th Man"
1960	Rawhide	First Bartender	S3:E6, "Incident on the Road to Yesterday"
1961	Rawhide	Rep Two	S4:E2, "The Sendoff"
1962	Rawhide	Nelson	S4:E28, "Gold Fever"
