= The Naked Genius =

Broadway play (1943)

The Naked Genius is a 1943 American play written by Gypsy Rose Lee. The work premiered on Broadway on October 21, 1943, at the Plymouth Theatre where it ran until November 20, 1943, for a total of 36 performances. The work was produced by Mike Todd, used sets designed by Frederick Fox, and costumes designed by Billy Livingston. The play was staged by George S. Kaufman, and starred Joan Blondell as Honey Bee Carroll, Pauline Myers as Angela, Millard Mitchell as Stuart Tracy, Rex O'Malley as Fred-Eric, Byron Russell as Williams, Bertha Belmore as Lollie Adams, Doro Merande as Myrtle McGuire, Donald Randolph as Charles Goodwin, Lewis Charles as Sam Hinkle, Rosemary Rice as Emily, Georgia Sothern as Alibassi, Phyllis Povah as Pansy, John Souther as Judge Taylor, Bernice Maison as Sally Martin, and Gil Maison as Teddy Martin.

Fox bought the film rights for $150,000.

The play was later adapted into the 1946 film Doll Face directed by Lewis Seiler and starring Carmen Miranda and Vivian Blaine.
