= Darren Vigil Gray =

- Born: July 29, 1959 (age 67); Dulce, New Mexico
- Citizenship: Jicarilla Apache Nation, United States
- Education: Institute of American Indian Arts, Santa Fe, New Mexico
- Children: 2

Darren Vigil Gray is a Jicarilla Apache painter and musician. He draws inspiration for his work from abstract expressionists such as Jackson Pollock and from his heritage.

== Early life and influences ==
Gray was born in Dulce, New Mexico to Thaymeus Bitseedy and Charlie Vigil. His father was a rodeo cowboy and rancher and performed as a Western guitarist in a band called the Apache Red Vests. He was also considered to be the tribal leader. His mother studied operatic voice in college and encouraged Gray to learn the piano and drums as a child. These experiences with his parents, along with his encounters with bands later during his career, has prompted Gray to note that "music and art are inextricably linked." During his teenage years, his parents were facing issues such as a divorce, which prompted him to desire leaving them. The divorce took a toll on Gray's brother, who took a long time to recover. Gray feared that the divorce will effect him too, in which he moved as he says "to find my own way."

Gray has stated that he saw a UFO during the fourth grade, while he was riding the bus, which he cites as showing him that "anything is possible" and incentivizing him to become an artist. As a teenager, he spent most summers on the pow-wow circuit with his cousin, during which time he learned the dances of both sides of his Apache background and explored his Native heritage through the Pan-Indian culture of the powwow. This also enabled him to spend time with painter relatives Francis and Nossman Vigil, which Gray has credited as having introduced a different perspective to art and influencing his path in art school. He has stated that “Long, long ago, I found that if you labeled yourself or categorized yourself as a Native artist, it pigeonholed you, put you in a box. I never wanted that. I never even called myself an Indian artist. That allowed me to be more free. That’s the cornerstone of my whole career. I just wanted to do what I wanted to do and not be dictated to or paint for a certain market.” After art school, Gray decided against teaching art, as he felt that it would put him in danger of becoming a "frustrated" artist who has a certain style or routine.

Gray believes that his source of ideas comes from various sources such as his roots, his memory of Apache rituals, the mysteries of the Southwest landscapes, his wife, and his travels while encountering different artist. Gray has noted that it is sometimes "difficult to belong to a community while pursuing an international career away from that community" and that him leaving his people early may cause people to see him differently, but that he disregards it because he identifies and is "proud" of his Native background and periodically revisits the reformation into which he was born.

Gray has also cited his daughters as playing a major role in his art, as he believes that art from children is the "most purest and least influenced" art from outside sources because their mind paints from the heart and spirit. He has also stated that he views remaining innovative as important and that he has to make a mess in order to make his art. By mess, he describes as turning the painting left, right, upside down; and out of all the chaos he "starts massaging the forms into play." In this technique, Gray states that art comes through creation without guidance rather than as he criticizes "what many artist do in creating their market art."

== Personal life ==
Gray is married to Jill Momaday, the daughter of Kiowa novelist N. Scott Momaday, in which they both raise two daughters together. He became a husband at a young age which shortly led him to being a father in which Gray states created responsibilities for him at a "very young age." They currently live near Santa Fe, where he went to school and launched his career. Even though Gray might have moved from the reservation, he revisits it to "bring back that experience."

== Education ==
After his parents' divorce Gray received permission from them to attend school outside of the reservation. He followed his cousin and first love, Carol Gala, to the Institute of American Indian Arts (IAIA), a tribal college in Santa Fe. While at IAIA he attended the high school program from 1975 to 1977 and studied with Otellie Loloma. Gray has stated that he had never been asked to create an art piece prior to attending IAIA and that he discovered a love for art that would soon "shape up his whole perspective." He was exposed to the work of Fritz Scholder and T.C Cannon, the latter of whom became Gray's mentor. He has noted that his early work greatly resembles Cannon's and that the design he inherits referring to his images with patterned surfaces "as a reworking to what T.C used to do. "

He then chose to transfer to The College of Santa Fe, Santa Fe, New Mexico in 1978 and remained at the college until the following year. There he met the artists Tesmar Mitchell and Ron Picco. From 1985 until 1986 he attended The University of New Mexico in Albuquerque, New Mexico. He states that his art would not have been where it is today if it was not for all the individuals that he encountered on his education journey through the years.

== Select artworks ==
=== Muse On ===
(2018): "Muse On," AIAI Museum of Contemporary Native Arts, Santa Fe- New Mexico
In this work Gray says, “My objective is the twisting, and turning, and bending, and re-depiction of this one location that’s been in my bind and in my psyche ever since I was a little boy.” Gray explains, that his intent was to keep adding to it until he believes that it is an accurate depiction of how it was in the past. In this piece, he paints of where his people, the Jicarilla Apache, used to roam. He believes that this is not his first or last illustration of that location, he says that he will keep adding or changing it until he believes he has the correct resemblance of what was there. Gray includes his perspective of his land and his connection to it in this piece.

=== Expanding Horizons ===
(August 16, 2018 ):"Expanding Horizons," available at The Museum of Contemporary Native Arts, Santa Fe, New Mexico. The IAIA exhibit describes it as Gray's personal approach to the subject "landscape," including his "painting method inspired by abstract expressionism and his inner self.". He reflects the multiple abstract elements and perspectives that shape up his methods when it comes to expressing his thoughts. Gray states that whether he was in his land or not, his perspective of its land can be seen through his work.

=== High Desert Drifter ===
2018: This painting, along with the seven paintings of his at the Gerald Peters Contemporary; are described by Gray as bringing life to these paintings. It is mixed with cultural origins, showing distance, the frontal power, with two landscapes of Ancient Abiquiu and their arching branches." His early encounters and perspectives to his land inspired his engagement into these landscapes.

=== Abiquiu Sunrise ===
"Abiquiu Sunrise" Although Vigil Gray did not have one specific style, this painting is what he states as what can define his most common idea of painting. The piece is an abstract expressionism which is included on canvas; as is the majority of his work. Objects included are Northern New Mexico landscapes and figural composition with their own mythology. This painting is said to be influenced by abstract expressionists such as Jackson Pollock, Willem de Kooning, and T.C Cannon. Gray believes that this piece is not like many landscape pieces in which they can easily be understood; instead he states that his piece comes through experience that many might not see.

== Exhibitions ==
Work of Gray can also be seen in these works, in which he was engaged in both many solo and group exhibitions:

=== Solo exhibitions ===
- (1989) "Five Contemporary Native American Artists," The Gibbs Museum, Charleston, South Carolina
- (1995) "Campsite," Peyton-Wright Gallery, Santa Fe, New Mexico
- (1995) "The Walk," Friesen Gallery, Seattle, Washington
- (2002) "Common Ground", Tucson Museum of Art, Tucson, Arizona
- (2002) "Counterclockwise/20 year Retrospective," Wheelwright Museum, Santa Fe, New Mexico
- (2003)"We’re Still Here With the Mountains," The Hubbard Museum of the American West, Ruidoso, New Mexico
- (2011):"Motherland of Basketmakers #16," Heard Museum, Phoenix, Arizona.
- (2018): "Expanding Horizons," Museum of Contemporary Native Arts, Santa Fe, New Mexico.
- (2018):"Bring of Light of Day," Gerald Peters Contemporary, Santa Fe, New Mexico.
- (2018):"The Screech of Birds," Gerald Peters Contemporary, Santa Fe, New Mexico.
- (2018):"The Sentinel," Gerald Peters Contemporary, Santa Fe, New Mexico.
- (2018):"Ancient AAbiquiu #3," Gerald Peters Contemporary, Santa Fe, New Mexico.
- (2018):"High Dessert Drifter," Gerald Peters Contemporary, Santa Fe, New Mexico.
- (2018):"Raise the Dust," Gerald Peters Contemporary, Santa Fe, New Mexico.
- (2018):"Rodeo Queen," Gerald Peters Contemporary, Santa Fe, New Mexico

=== Group exhibitions ===
- (1981)Turtle Museum Premier Art Show, Niagara Falls, New York
- (1979) Museum of the American Indian, Heye Foundation, New York, New York
- (1978–79) Annual Indian Market Show, Santa Fe, New Mexico
- (1986) Politics Now Exhibit, Reinventing Politics Symposium, Telluride, Colorado
- (1990) The Art of the West Invitational, Eiteljorg Museum, Indianapolis, Indiana
- (1993) Lollapalooza Tour, Native American Mural Project, Various U.S. cities
- (1996) Charlie Russell Art Auction, Great Falls, Montana
- (1997) The IAIA Experience, Institute of American Indian Arts Museum, Santa Fe, New Mexico
- (2006): "Instincts Keep Me Running Like A Deer " LewAllen Contemporary, Santa Fe, NM

== Collections ==
- Museum of Contemporary Native Arts, Santa Fe N.M
- Center for Contemporary Art, Santa Fe, N.M
- Gerald Peters Gallery - Santa Fe, N.M
- Wheelwright Museum- Santa Fe, N.M
- National Museum of American Arts, Washington, DC
- IAIA Museum of Contemporary Native Arts
- Heard Museum, Phoenix Arizona
- Museum of Mankind, Vienna, Austria
- Philbrook Museum of Art, Tulsa
- The Bruce Museum, Greenwich Connecticut
- Denver Art Museum, Denver, Colorado.

== Honors and awards ==
- Mayor's (of Santa Fe) Awards for Excellence in the Arts 2010

== Publications ==
In these works Gray's work is explained from his perspective while including his artwork.

- Counterclockwise Wheelwright Museum of the American Indian, 2002.
- Darren Vigil Gray: rainbows, clouds, hail and the morning star.
