= Walter Ben Hare =

American playwright and meteorologist (1880–1950)

Walter Ben Hare (February 20, 1880 – June 30, 1950) was an American playwright and meteorologist. He authored plays under his own name and using the pseudonyms Lt. Beal Cormack and Mary Modena Burns. A prolific dramatist who penned more than 200 plays, his works were popular with amateur community theatre groups in the United States. While his works were rarely staged professionally, he became wealthy through his work as a playwright.

Hare's best known work was the best-selling play Aaron Slick from Punkin Crick (1919) which was popular with amateur community theatre and school dramatic groups in the United States. It was adapted into the 1952 film Aaron Slick from Punkin Crick. He wrote The Minstrel Encyclopedia published in 1921.

In addition to his work as a writer, he had a brief career as a professional actor and was a meteorologist with the United States Weather Bureau from 1905 to 1938.

== Life and career ==
Walter Ben Hare was born in Sandusky, Ohio, on February 20, 1880. He began his college education at Emory College (now Emory University) in Atlanta, Georgia, where he was a member of the Alpha Tau Omega (ATO) fraternity. He was named a poet laureate of that organization. He transferred from Emory to Sewanee: The University of the South in Tennessee which is where he ultimately earned his undergraduate diploma in 1905.

In 1905 Hare moved to Columbia, Missouri, to work for the United States Weather Bureau (USWB) as a meteorologist. He simultaneously was a graduate student at the University of Missouri where he was also involved in performing in plays. He was also active as a director of plays for both middle school and high schools productions put on by Columbia Public Schools. In 1909 he moved to Columbus, Ohio, after being transferred to the USWB's offices in that city. He simultaneously joined the staff of Ohio State University as a drama coach.

Hare worked as a meteorologist for the USWB in various cities before retiring in 1938. These included posts in Tampa, Florida; Palestine, Texas; Scranton, Pennsylvania; Springfield, Missouri; Ithaca, New York; and Canton, New York. He also worked as a professor of meteorology at Drury University in Springfield. He ended his career working for the USWB in Phoenix, Arizona where he ultimately retired. During this time he was also active as a prolific playwright for predominantly amateur theatre, producing more than 200 plays. One of his earliest works to gain interest among amateur theatre groups nationally was A College Town (1910).

Hare wrote plays using both his own name and pseudonyms. He once stated, "I use the pen name Lt. Beal Cormack for the plays that I’m ashamed of, the name Mary Modena Burns for the religious plays, and the other stuff I write under my own name.” He used the Cormack pseudonym when he published what became his best known work, the play Aaron Slick from Punkin Crick (1919). The Associated Press wrote in 1950 that it "never was played before city audiences but was believed to have been seen by more rural residents than any other American play". The play made Hare wealthy. It was staged more than 28,000 times during his lifetime and sold over a million copies. It was posthumously adapted into the 1952 film Aaron Slick from Punkin Crick starring Alan Young, Dinah Shore, and Robert Merrill. The New York Times stated that the stage play had been performed more than 40,000 times in the United States by the time of the movie's premiere.

Hare also wrote The Minstrel Encyclopedia (1921) which was a guide to staging a minstrel show for the amateur performing group. He had experience directing amateur minstrel shows, and was the director of the Elks Minstrels in Columbia, Missouri for performances given to raise money to build a new auditorium in that city in 1909. Ultimately the building constructed by the Elks was a public dance hall located on South Eighth St. which opened as Columbia Hall in February 1910. In 1916 he portrayed Aunt Mandy, a mammy stereotype character, in an amateur minstrel show in Springfield staged by the Shriners.

Hare died of a heart attack at the age of 70 on June 30, 1950, in his room at the Hotel Statler in St. Louis, Missouri. At that time, he was traveling to his home in Phoenix, Arizona after having attended a class reunion at Emory College in Atlanta and an Alpha Tau Omega convention in Cincinnati. He is buried at Greenwood Memorial Park (now Greenwood/Memory Lawn Mortuary & Cemetery).

== Partial list of works ==
My Irish rose, a comedy-drama of Irish life in three acts, readable pdf

Old days in Dixie – a comedy-drama in three acts, readable pdf

=== Written as Walter Ben Hare ===
- A College Town: A College Farce Comedy in Three Acts (1910)
- Aaron Boggs, Freshman: A College Comedy in Three Acts (1913)
- The Fascinators: A Musical Burlesque Entertainment in One Act (1913)
- A Southern Cinderella: A Comedy-Drama in Three Acts (1913)
- Parlor Matches: An Engaging Comedy of Society in Two Acts (1915)
- Sewing for the Heathen: A Comedy in One Act for Nine Ladies (1915)
- Abbu San of Old Japan: Comedy-Drama in Two Acts for Fifteen Girls (1916)
- Bride and Groom: A Farce in Three Acts (1916)
- A Country Boy Scout (1916)
- Much Ado About Betty: A Comedy in Three Acts (1916)
- And Home Came Ted: A Comedy of Mystery in Three Acts, Guaranteed Under the Pure Fund Laws (1917)
- An Old Fashioned Mother: A Dramatic Parable of a Mother's Love, in Three Acts (1917)
- Isosceles: A Play in One Act (1917)
- The White Christmas and other Merry Christmas Plays (1917)
- The Adventures of Grandpa: A Wholesome Farce in Three Acts (1918)
- Grandma Gibbs of the Red Cross: A Patriotic Comedy Drama in Four Acts (1918)
- Mrs. Tubbs Does Her Bit: A Patriotic Comedy-Drama in Three Acts (1918)
- Always in Trouble or The Hoodooed Coon (1919)
- The Beantown Choir (1919)
- Costume Monologues (1919)
- My Irish Rose: A Comedy-Drama of Irish Life in Three Acts (1919)
- Over Here: A Drama of American Patriotism, In Three Acts (1919)
- Aboard a Slow Train in Mizzoury (1920)
- And Billy Disappeared: A Mystery Comedy in Four Acts (1920)
- Old Days in Dixie: A Comedy-Drama in Three Acts (1920)
- Gimme Them Peanuts!: A "Hokum" Afterpiece in Three Scenes (1921)
- The Minstrel Encyclopedia (1921)
- Readings and Monologues à la Mode (1921)
- Sunshine: A comedy with Music; a Tonic for the Glooms in Three Acts (1922)
- Comics; Readings, Monologues, Pianologues, Encore Bits in Prose and Verse (1924)

=== Written as Lieutenant Beale Cormack ===
- Aaron Slick from Punkin Crick (1919)
- Aunt Jerushy on the War-Path (1923)

=== Written as Mary Modena Burns ===
- Her Honor the Mayor: A Comedy in Three Acts (1916)
- Good Things for Sunday Schools: A Complete Entertainer (1916)
- Schoolroom Entertainments, Dialogues, Exercises, Recitations, Plays, Folk Dances, etc., For Use in the Schoolroom (1920)
- The Doo-Funny Family (1920)
