= Johnny Comes Flying Home =

1946 film by Benjamin Stoloff

- Theatrical film poster
- Directed by: Benjamin Stoloff (credited as Ben Stoloff)
- Written by: George Bricker (story); George Bricker (screenplay); Jack Andrews (screenplay)
- Based on: story by Jack Andrews
- Produced by: Aubrey Schenck
- Starring: Richard Crane; Faye Marlowe; Martha Stewart; Charles Russell; Roy Roberts; Henry Morgan; Charles Tannen; Elaine Langan
- Cinematography: Harry Jackson
- Edited by: John W. McCafferty (credited as John McCafferty)
- Music by: David Buttolph
- Production company: Twentieth Century-Fox Film Corp.
- Distributed by: Twentieth Century-Fox
- Release date: April 5, 1946
- Running time: 65–66 minutes
- Country: United States
- Language: English

Johnny Comes Flying Home is a 1946 American adventure film directed by Benjamin Stoloff and starring Richard Crane and Faye Marlowe; the supporting cast features Harry Morgan. The plot involves postwar pilots starting a small aviation company.

== Plot ==
U.S. Army Air Forces fighter pilot Johnny Martin (Richard Crane) is diagnosed with nerve exhaustion at his discharge medical and is prevented from flying for a year. Instead he goes home with one of the other pilots, Miles Cary (Charles Russell), to his hometown in Iowa. While Miles returns to his family and his job at the bank, Johnny has a hard time adapting to the tedious ordinary life in the small town and starts working as a bus driver. One day he quits his job.

Joe Patillo (Henry Morgan), his other pilot buddy from the Army, is planning to start flying again, using a surplus Douglas C-47 transport aircraft. Johnny and Miles both agree to join Joe in California where Joe lives, and get their first job, to fly to New York.

Since Johnny is forbidden to fly, Miles and Joe fly the C-47 to New York. Miles's wife Sally (Faye Marlowe) is anxious about him flying again and asks why Johnny is not flying. Ashamed over his inability to fly. Johnny lies, telling Sally that he needs to work with the administration and marketing of the company.

Joe and Miles return with a passenger in the aircraft, Anne Cummings (Martha Stewart). Johnny is upset since he was not informed, and does not calm down knowing Anne paid for the trip. He is further upset when he finds out that Anne is hired as the new company mechanic.

Johnny keeps trying to get business for the company and works hard to get a contract with oil tycoon J.P. Hartley (Roy Roberts). He fails because Hartley considers their operation too small to carry out the work. Instead they continue flying for other companies.

After a while Anne demands they use the earnings on repairing the aircraft. Since the men do not follow her advice she takes matters in her own hands and talks to the owner of a garage, Harry (Charles Tannen), about the repairs and the aircraft is transported there.

Johnny is furious when he finds out, since the company is prevented from flying a mission and loses its commission. Since they don't have the money to pay Harry, the aircraft remains at the garage. Anne is subsequently fired. Soon after they hear that Hartley's aircraft has crash landed in the middle of nowhere. The men decide to steal their aircraft back from the garage and fly out there to fetch Hartley. As gratitude for saving him, Hartley pays their debts to the garage and they are in business again.

Miles is beginning to worry about his own finances, since Sally is about to give birth to their second child any day. He accepts a job test flying a new jet aircraft, to earn $10,000. He makes Johnny swear not to tell Sally, since she would be too worried for his safety.

The same day as the Lockheed P-80 Shooting Star test flight, Sally goes into labor. To prevent Miles from flying, Johnny locks him into a phone booth and takes his place as pilot on the test flight. Anne finds out and pleads with him not to fly, knowing his medical condition. Johnny admits his love for Anne as they speak, but insists on flying to save his friend and prove his own capability as a pilot. He successfully flies the P-80 and returns to Anne on the ground.

== Cast ==
- Richard Crane as Johnny Martin
- Faye Marlowe as Sally Cary
- Martha Stewart as Anne Cummings
- Charles Russell as Miles Cary
- Roy Roberts as J. P. Hartley
- Henry Morgan as Joe Patillo
- Charles Tannen as Harry
- Elaine Langan as Peggy-Lou Robinson
- Marietta Canty as Jennie
- Anthony Sydes as Butch Cary
- Selmer Jackson as Dr. Gunderson
- John Hamilton as C. H. Metters

== Production ==
The sequences in which "Johnny" tests the new aircraft do include actual footage of the new P-80 jet fighter. Lockheed Aircraft Corp. loaned the studio 1,500 feet of "military film of the spin tests of the Shooting Star", shot in 1945. Studio publicity noted that some sequences were shot on location at the Metropolitan Airport in Van Nuys, California.

== Reception ==
Johnny Comes Flying Home was primarily a B film, and although aerial scenes were notable, fell short in other aspects. In a later appraisal, film historian Stephen Pendo in Aviation in the Cinema (1985) noted that the film was "unimaginative".
