= Those Two (TV series) =

American TV musical variety series (1951–1953)

Those Two is an American musical variety television series that was broadcast on NBC November 26, 1951 - April 24, 1953.

== Overview ==
Vivian Blaine portrayed a nightclub singer with Pinky Lee as her accompanist. The story line had Lee in love with Blaine while she loved another man. The framework of the series provided opportunities for duets and for solo performances by each star. Broadway actor Tony Bavaar was signed to a two-year contract to replace Lee, beginning on February 11, 1952. Beginning May 26, 1952, Martha Stewart replaced Blaine as co-star.

== Production ==
Replacing Mohawk Showroom, Those Two was broadcast live on Mondays, Wednesdays, and Fridays from 7:30 to 7:45 p.m. Eastern Time, preceding NBC's nightly newscast. Procter & Gamble sponsored the program, promoting Tide, Prell, and Lilt. Those Two originated from WNBT-TV through August 22, 1952, when it took a two-week hiatus with Meet Your Match filling its time slot. During the hiatus the program moved to Hollywood, where it originated from KNBH and returned to the air on September 8, 1952. Ben Brady was the producer, and Bill States was the director. The writers were Johnny Greene and Lee Wainer. Music was led by Harry Lubin. Procter & Gamble attributed cancellation of the program to high costs for its time slot.

== Critical response ==
Jack Gould wrote in a review in The New York Times that the program "stands in dire need of a complete change of format". Gould described three programs within the program: Blaine singing, Lee doing comedy, and the singer-accompanist relationship. He wrote that only the first of those was well done. Lee's comedy, he wrote, "at the moment suffers from a dearth of both material and versatility", while the singer-accompanist segment was "too much of too much".

A review in Time magazine included Those Two as one of two of three new TV shows in which "the singers are almost buried under plot and counterplot, characterization and attempted comedy". The review described the dialog between Blaine and Lee as "feeble, Runyonesque banter".

In a review of the premiere episode in The Philadelphia Inquirer, Merrill Panitt called the show "a tragedy" because of the pairing of the two stars. Panitt wrote that the production was excellent, with good camera technique, good timing, and good delivery of the commercial. "There was nothing wanting except a good program," he wrote. He complimented Blaine's singing but said that she should not have to contort her face with her character's Brooklyn accent. Panitt added, "Pinky Lee is not funny", concluding that the show's writers had little choice but to create lines for him that fit his established character.
