= Faye Marlowe =

American film and television actress (1926–2022)

- Born: October 26, 1926; Los Angeles, California, U.S.
- Died: May 5, 2022 (aged 95); Cary, North Carolina, U.S.
- Occupations: Film actress, author
- Years active: 1945–1955

Faye Marlowe, also known as Faye Joseph and Faye Heuston (October 26, 1926 – May 5, 2022) was an American film and television actress with a career spanning a single decade, from 1945 to 1955.

== Early life ==
Faye Marlowe was born in Los Angeles, California on October 26, 1926. She was an illegitimate child and her mother had been abandoned by her alcoholic father. Marlowe was adopted by show business producer Fanchon Simon and William Simon at 18 months old. She graduated from Los Angeles University High School in 1943.

== Film career ==
She was discovered by a talent scout at the Hollywood film studio 20th Century Fox in 1943. She was one of the candidates to play the part of Bonnie Watson in the 1944 film Greenwich Village, which would be voted on by the general public. Ultimately, the part went to Gale Robbins. In 1944, she acted opposite Glenn Langan in a stage production called There's Always Juliet, directed by John Brahm.

What would become her breakthrough part was announced in 1944, when she was cast by Brahm to act in the 1945 thriller Hangover Square, starring George Sanders, Linda Darnell and Laird Cregar. She was considered for the role of Ruth Berent in Leave Her to Heaven, which eventually went to Jeanne Crain. Instead, she was cast in Junior Miss. The third film of her career was The Spider in 1945.

She was Eddie Albert's leading lady in Rendezvous with Annie and also played a lead role in Johnny Comes Flying Home, both in 1946.

Marlowe was featured in several other movies as well as three different major parts in the television anthology series Conrad Nagel Theater in 1955.

== Later life and death ==
Marlowe later worked as a writer under the name Faye Hueston. Her 2010 book "Silent Enemy" describes the effects of pesticide toxins on humans and other mammals; her 2016 book "Invisible Enemy," chronicles the effects of environmental illness caused by chemical pollution.

Her autobiography, "Fanchon's Daughter," was published on July 14, 2014; in addition to recounting her life in show business, she also described her interest in psychic phenomena She was a life member of the American Society of Dowsers and wrote on the subject of map dowsing and geopathic stress.

From 1990 onward, she resided in North Carolina, having previously lived in Italy, France and England. Marlowe died in Cary, North Carolina on May 5, 2022, at the age of 95.
