= Doll Face =

1945 film by Lewis Seiler

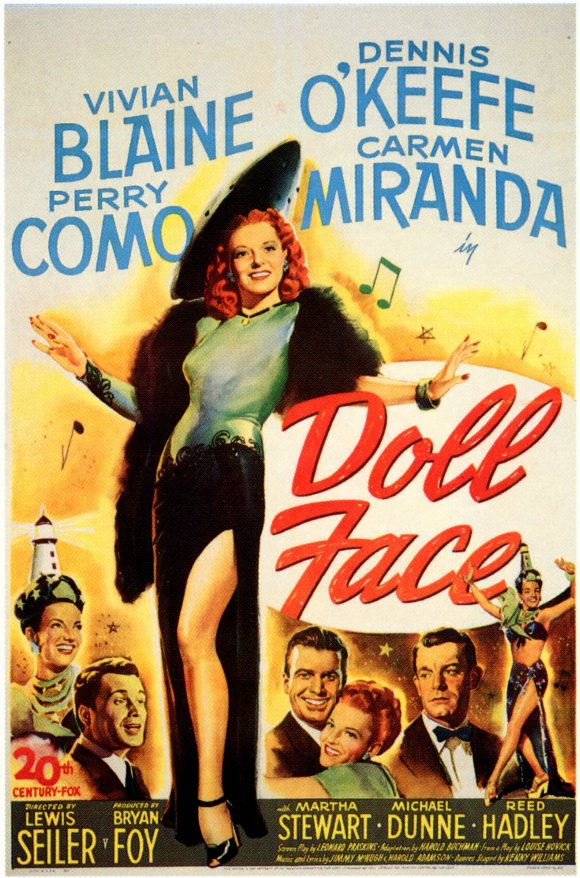
- Film poster
- Directed by: Lewis Seiler
- Screenplay by: Leonard Praskins; Harold Buchman (adaptation)
- Based on: The Naked Genius by Gypsy Rose Lee
- Produced by: Bryan Foy
- Starring: Vivian Blaine; Dennis O'Keefe; Perry Como; Carmen Miranda; Martha Stewart; Stephen Dunne; Reed Hadley
- Cinematography: Joseph LaShelle
- Edited by: Norman Colbert
- Distributed by: 20th Century Fox
- Release date: December 31, 1945
- Running time: 80 minutes
- Country: United States
- Language: English
- Budget: $3 million
- Box office: $2.5 million

Doll Face is a 1945 American musical film released by 20th Century Fox and directed by Lewis Seiler starring Vivian Blaine as "Doll Face" Carroll. It also stars actor Dennis O'Keefe and singers Carmen Miranda and Perry Como. The film is based on the 1943 play The Naked Genius written by Gypsy Rose Lee. In the opening credits, she is billed under her birth name, Louise Hovick. The film is also known as Come Back to Me in the United Kingdom.

== Plot ==
"Doll Face" Carroll is an entertainer looking to expand her repertoire. After a failed audition, where she is recognized as a burlesque performer from the Gaiety Theatre, her manager and fiancé Mike Hannegan suggests she write an autobiography to project a more literate image and he hires Frederick Manly Gerard as a ghostwriter. Doll Face agrees on the condition she is allowed to dedicate the book to Mike with "For the love of Mike".

Another performer in the burlesque show, Chita Chula, remarks that if the book is a success and Doll Face leaves the show it will probably have to close. Mike then decides to produce a Broadway show of his own with the financial aid of the performers themselves. Frederick offers to put up any money missing. Chita Chula is skeptical she can pull it off, but Mike assures her she'll "probably wind up being another Carmen Miranda!", something Chita Chula perceives as an insult.

Mike leaks word on the book to the press, and riding the publicity, argues the show got all the press it needs and that the book, although all but finished, need not be published. Doll Face, however, decides to go through with it and goes to Jamaica in Queens, NY with Frederick for some final touch-ups. Boat engine trouble on Long Island Sound leaves them marooned on an island and, when Mike finds them, he misreads the situation and breaks up with her. Without "Doll Face" as headliner, the Gaiety Theatre struggles and Mike is forced to finally shut it down.

Doll Face releases her book The Genius DeMilo and when Mike sees she dedicated the book to Frederick instead of him, he regrets leaving her. After Doll Face refuses to talk to Mike, he sends a lawyer to stop her show in the middle of opening night, since she is under contract not to appear in any show not produced by him. She agrees to see him and he asks her forgiveness. After they reunite, she tricks the producer of her show to give Mike a 25% share and co-producer credit so the show can continue.

== Cast ==
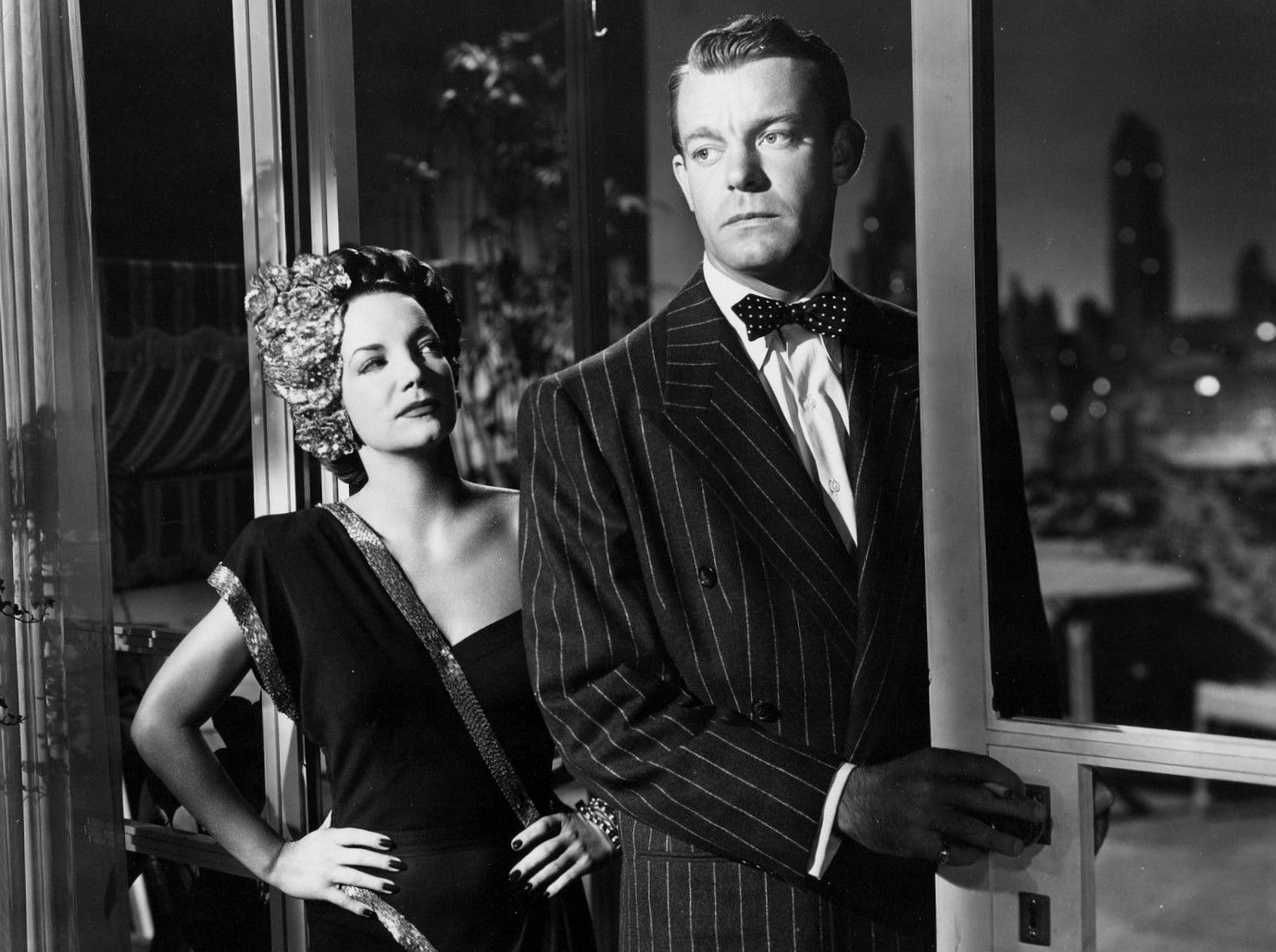
Carmen Miranda and Dennis O'Keefe in a scene

- Vivian Blaine as Mary Elizabeth (Maybeth) "Doll Face" Carroll
- Dennis O'Keefe as Michael Francis "Mike" Hannegan
- Perry Como as Nicky Ricci
- Carmen Miranda as Chita Chula
- Martha Stewart as Frankie Porter
- Stephen Dunne as Frederick Manly Gerard (credited as Michael Dunne)
- Reed Hadley as Flo Hartman
- Stanley Prager as Flo's aide
- Charles Tannen as Flo's aide
- George E. Stone as stage manager
- Frank Orth as Peters
- Donald MacBride as Ferguson (lawyer)
- Robert Mitchum as passenger (uncredited)
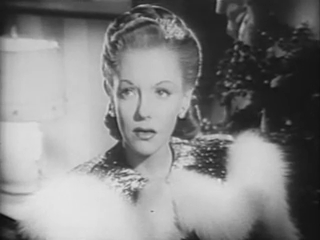
Vivian Blaine
as "Doll Face" Carroll

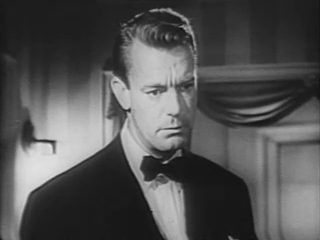
Dennis O'Keefe
as Mike Hannegan

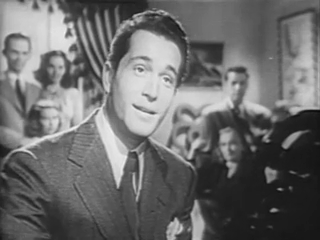
Perry Como
as Nicky Ricci

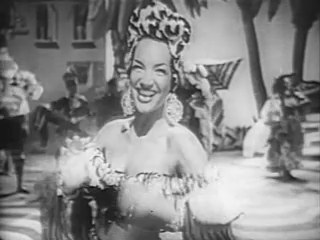
Carmen Miranda
as Chita Chula

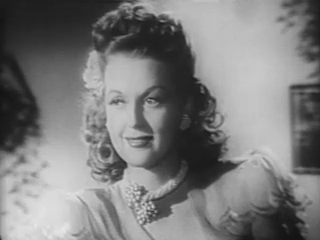
Martha Stewart
as Frankie Porter

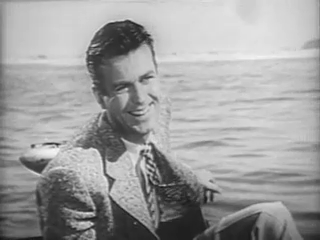
Stephen Dunne
as Frederick Manly Gerard

== Soundtrack ==
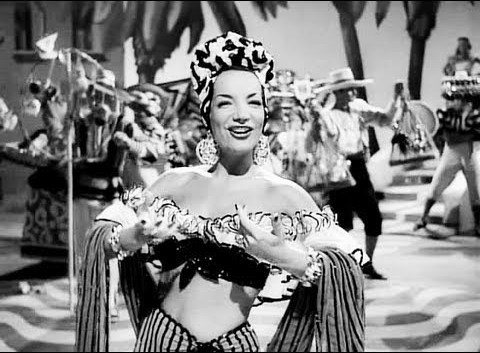
Carmen Miranda in the musical number to "Chico Chico"

- Vivian Blaine - "Somebody's Walking in My Dream" (Music by Jimmy McHugh, Lyrics by Harold Adamson)
- Perry Como and Martha Stewart - "Somebody's Walking in My Dream" (Music by Jimmy McHugh, Lyrics by Harold Adamson)
- Perry Como and chorus girls - "Red Hot and Beautiful" (Music by Jimmy McHugh, Lyrics by Harold Adamson)
- Vivian Blaine and male quartet - "Red Hot and Beautiful" (Music by Jimmy McHugh, Lyrics by Harold Adamson)
- "Eighty Miles Outside of Atlanta"
- Perry Como - "Here Comes Heaven Again" (Music by Jimmy McHugh, Lyrics by Harold Adamson)
- Perry Como and Vivian Blaine - "Here Comes Heaven Again" (Music by Jimmy McHugh, Lyrics by Harold Adamson)
- Perry Como and Martha Stewart - "Dig You Later (A-Hubba Hubba Hubba)" (Music by Jimmy McHugh, Lyrics by Harold Adamson)
- Carmen Miranda, Bando da Lua and chorus - "Chico Chico" (Music by Jimmy McHugh, Lyrics by Harold Adamson)
- "The Parisian Trot" (Music by Lionel Newman, lyrics by Charles E. Henderson)

Jimmy McHugh and Harold Adamson also submitted the song "True to the Navy", but it did not make it into the film because Paramount refused to license the song.

The song "Dig You Later (A-Hubba Hubba Hubba)" was a celebration of the Bombing of Tokyo (10 March 1945).

== Production and filming ==
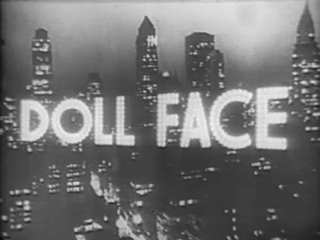
Title card of Doll Face. The film is also known as Come Back to Me in the United Kingdom. Other titles considered during production were The Naked Genius (from Gypsy Rose Lee's play) and Here's a Kiss.

The working titles of this film were The Naked Genius and Here's a Kiss. However, the Motion Picture Production Code prohibited the studio from using The Naked Genius as the film's title or as the title of "Doll Face's" fictional autobiography.

The Production Code Administration also strongly objected to the portrayal of the lead character as a stripper, and several screenplays submitted by the studio were rejected. In late July 1945, Joseph Breen, the head of the Production Code Administration, cautioned studio public relations head Jason S. Joy:

"Please have in mind that any time you undertake to identify a character as a 'strip tease' artist, you run the risk of giving enormous offense everywhere. People, pretty generally, look up [sic] the business of the burlesque shows--and, more importantly, the strip tease--as, possibly, the very lowest form of public entertainment, and this same viewpoint is reflected in the reaction of the Censor Boards."

— Joseph I. Breen,

Playwright and famous stripper Gypsy Rose Lee was credited onscreen under her real name, Louise Hovick. The Hollywood Reporter (April 6, 1944) reported that producer George Jessel had offered Lee a role in the film, but she did not appear. According to the Hollywood Reporter (June 1944), Carole Landis was set to star in the film and Jackie Gleason was to play the "comedy lead." Another report from July 1945 mentioned that William Eythe was scheduled to play the "romantic lead," and Hazel Dawn was also listed as part of the cast. However, Dawn's appearance in the final film has not been confirmed. Dennis O'Keefe was borrowed for the film from Edward Small's company. Doll Face marked the screen debuts of Martha Stewart and Lex Barker.

Producer Bryan Foy filled in for director Lewis Seiler for three days while Seiler was ill.

Songwriters Jimmy McHugh and Harold Adamson submitted the song "True to the Navy" for inclusion in the film, and a production number featuring it was filmed at a cost of $60,000 to $75,000. However, McHugh and Adamson had previously submitted the song to Paramount, which had used it in their 1945 film Bring on the Girls. Paramount refused to license the song for use in Doll Face, so the musical number had to be cut. In a December 1945 letter to Twentieth Century-Fox studio president Spyros Skouras, studio attorney George Wasson speculated that Paramount’s refusal was due to Twentieth Century-Fox having secured the distribution rights to Tales of Manhattan and clearance for the use of the title Sentimental Journey, both of which Paramount also wanted.

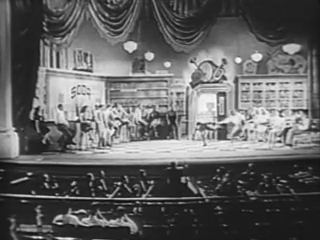
Chorus performs "Dig You Later (A-Hubba Hubba Hubba)" in the Show-within-a-show. A suit was filed against the studio for plagiarizing another composition.

According to legal records, Irving Weissman sued the studio, claiming that the song "Dig You Later (A Hubba-Hubba-Hubba)" had been plagiarized from one of his compositions. The case was dismissed in September 1948 by a federal court judge, but Weissman later filed another lawsuit in state court. The outcome of the second lawsuit has not been determined.

== Reviews ==
Bosley Crowther’s review in The New York Times of Doll Face describes the film as a disappointing production, failing to justify the hefty price paid by Twentieth Century-Fox for the rights to Louise Hovick's (Gypsy Rose Lee) literary effort. The review points out that the screenplay is monotonous and riddled with grammatical errors, and that it brings no innovation or significant personality to the characters or the music. The performances of the leading actors are also criticized: Vivian Blaine, as the titular "Doll Face," is described as expressionless in her musical numbers, while Perry Como and Carmen Miranda are also called out for their lackluster performances. Como’s number, “Dig You Later,” is particularly singled out, described as an exaggerated, unappealing song. Dennis O'Keefe and Stephen Dunne are mentioned as the men in "Doll Face's" life, but their performances go unremarked upon. Overall, Crowther’s review suggests that, despite being based on Hovick’s work, her talents were not well-utilized, and Doll Face is portrayed as a lifeless, colorless production lacking the boldness that defined burlesque at its peak.

The review from the New York Herald Tribune remarks on Carmen Miranda’s performance, noting that she does what she always does, but “not as well” this time around.

Columnist Louella Parsons, in her analysis, expresses surprise at the casting of Carmen Miranda in the film, highlighting how she is “so different from Joan Blondell,” who played the same role in the stage version of the play Naked Genius, upon which the film is based. The comparison between the two actresses suggests that, for Parsons, Miranda’s casting in the role felt unnatural or unconvincing, especially since the two have very different styles, and Miranda failed to recreate the charm or energy that Blondell brought to the stage. The Sydney Morning Herald wrote that "The film has its faults, chiefly technical... Dennis O'Keefe makes a handsome, hard-hitting manager and performs with great sincerity. Perry Como sings in an even more attractive manner than before, and Vivian Blaine is more than adequately attractive, if a bit too polished, as the 'burlesque' blonde. Carmen Miranda appears in a straight role with only one musical number. The innovation is not a success, but the fault lies with the director, not Carmen's".

Alex Viany’s review in O Cruzeiro of Doll Face is extremely negative. He begins by noting that, even with the use of Technicolor, the 20th Century Fox musical would be irredeemably dull, suggesting that no amount of vibrant color could save the film from its failure. Viany criticizes the romance between Vivian Blaine and Dennis O'Keefe, calling it "so ridiculous that it’s almost pitiful," indicating that the romantic plot was poorly executed and unconvincing. Regarding Carmen Miranda’s performance, Viany is harsh, stating that she "does nothing" in the film and that her makeup was "horribly done," reflecting dissatisfaction with both her appearance and her acting in the production. The review from O Cruzeiro aligns with that of A Cena Muda, which also considers Doll Face to be “the worst film of Carmen Miranda,” further reinforcing the idea that the film was a major disappointment in her career.

== Home media ==
The film was released on DVD in June 2008 as part of Fox's "The Carmen Miranda Collection."

== Parody ==
In 1985, comedy troop LA Connection used Doll Face as episode 9 of its syndicated show Mad Movies, in which films were re-edited with a dubbed soundtrack. The plot centers around the sleazy "Miss Doll Face Pageant".

== Gallery ==
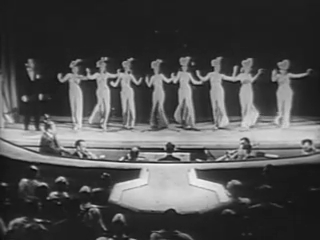
Nicky performs "Red Hot and Beautiful" at the burlesque Gaiety Theatre.

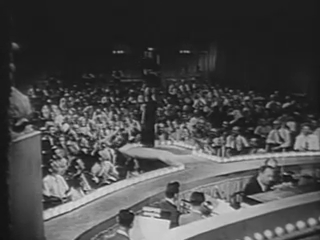
Doll Face performs "Red Hot and Beautiful" to an enthusiastic crowd.

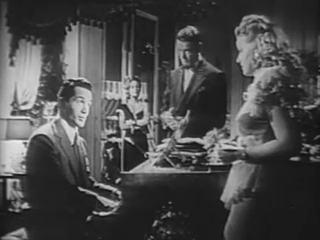
Nicky performing "Here Comes Heaven Again"

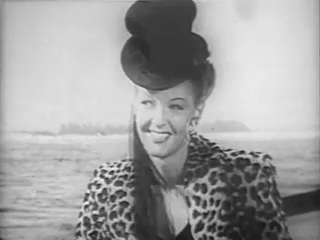
Doll Face on her way to make the final adjustments to her autobiography.

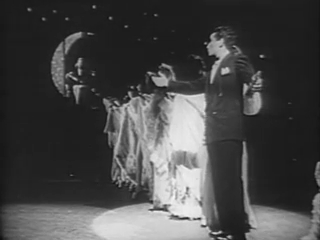
Frankie and Nicky perform "Somebody's Walking in My Dream".

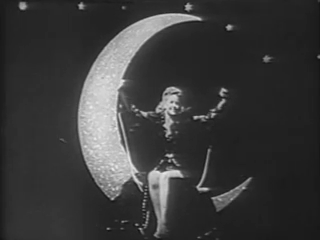
Frankie performing "Somebody's Walking in My Dream"

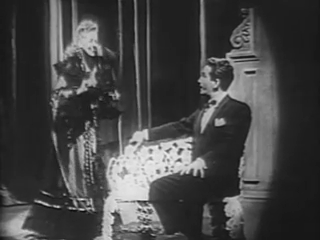
Frankie and Nicky perform "Somebody's Walking in My Dream".

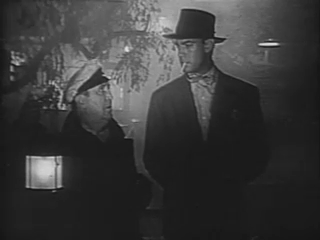
A worried Mike searching for Doll Face.

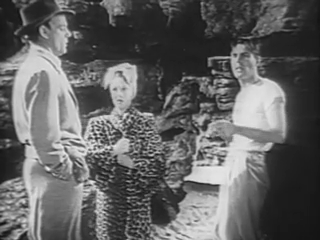
Mike finds Doll Face and Frederick.

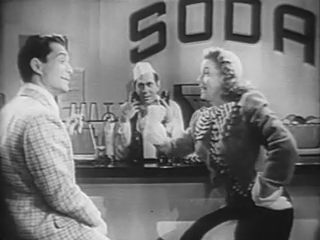
Nicky and Frankie rehearses "Dig You Later (A Hubba-Hubba-Hubba)".

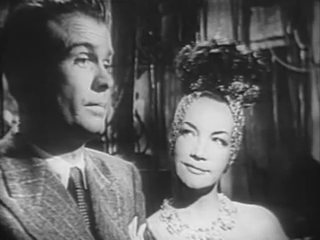
Frederick suspects Doll Face is unhappy. Chita suggests he should know.

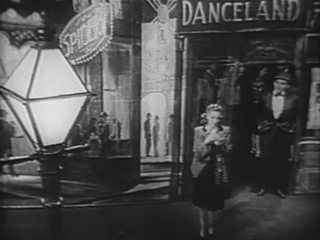
Rehearsing Nicky's "Here Comes Heaven Again" proves too much for Doll Face.
