= Aaron Slick from Punkin Crick =

1952 film by Claude Binyon

- Directed by: Claude Binyon
- Written by: Story: Claude Binyon; Play: Walter Benjamin Hare
- Produced by: William Perlberg; George Seaton
- Starring: Alan Young; Dinah Shore; Robert Merrill; Adele Jergens; Minerva Urecal; Martha Stewart
- Cinematography: Charles Lang
- Edited by: Archie Marshek
- Music by: Robert Emmett Dolan
- Distributed by: Paramount Pictures
- Release dates: April 12, 1952 (Los Angeles); April 18, 1952 (New York)
- Running time: 95 minutes
- Country: United States
- Language: English

Aaron Slick from Punkin Crick (also known as Marshmallow Moon in the U.K. and the Philippines and Härkiä, heiniä ja hakkailua in Finland) is a 1952 Paramount Pictures hillbilly musical film directed by Claude Binyon and produced by William Perlberg and George Seaton. It is based on Walter Ben Hare's 1919 play of the same title, one of the most frequently produced in the history of American theater, with more than 50,000 performances at the time of the film's release, mainly by amateur groups. The film's cinematographer was Charles Lang and its costumes were designed by Edith Head.

== Plot ==
A dreamy farm widow is obsessed with moving to the city and is courted by her shy bumpkin neighbor Aaron Slick. She is nearly tricked into losing her oil-rich land to crooks.

== Cast ==
- Alan Young as Aaron Slick
- Dinah Shore as Josie Berry
- Robert Merrill as Bill Merridew
- Adele Jergens as Gladys
- Minerva Urecal as Mrs. Peabody
- Martha Stewart as Soubrette
- Fritz Feld as Headwaiter
- Veda Ann Borg as Girl in Red
- Chick Chandler as Pitchman

The film marked Young's first starring role after three supporting roles in the 1940s. Shore had not acted on screen since 1944's Belle of the Yukon, and Aaron Slick from Punkin Crick would be her last major film role. The film was opera star Merrill's screen debut.

== Reception ==
In a contemporary review for The New York Times, reviewer Bosley Crowther sharply criticized the film for following the original play, which he described "as loaded as a corn-crib is with corn", rather than lampooning its "naive conceits", writing:

As hard as it is to imagine, William Perlberg and George Seaton have produced a straight-away, gen-you-WINE screen offering of the hayseed comedy, undisturbed by anything more sophisticated than Technicolor and ten routine songs. ... Claude Binyon, who wrote and directed, must have done so in a stultifying trance; not a trace of his well-known wit or drollery is evident in this film. And the songs, which are woodenly delivered by Miss Shore, Mr. Young and Robert Merrill, who plays the city rascal, are hard to remember as far as the door. Having been borrowed (without improvement) from the rural amateurs, "Aaron Slick from Punkin Crick" can now be turned back with a fast shove to the thespians to whom it belongs.

Critic Philip K. Scheuer of the Los Angeles Times wrote:

The Paramount production, which has old Technicolor and a new score by Jay Livingston and Ray Evans, is just a mite too calculated to be enjoyed as unadulterated corn. On the other hand, the appearance of neither Mr. Merrill, who is also a star of the Metropolitan Opera, not of an occasional tricky polysyllabic rhyme in the score is going to persuade the middle or highbrow that he is sitting in on the birth of another "Bloomer Girl" or "Oklahoma!" Let's just say "Aaron Slick" falls somewhere between. ... Much of the humor is not very funny. "

Variety was lukewarm, reporting: "The bucolic humor presented is of a mild brand, the music score that has been added to the original play is fair, and while the performances are competent its chances in the general market are spotty."

Harrison's Reports wrote that the film should give "... fairly good satisfaction to the general run of audiences, although it will probably find its best reception in the smaller towns and cities."

John McCarten of The New Yorker wrote: "Every cliché of musical barnyard drama is included here, and the song lyrics run to such idiocies as 'Purt Nigh but Not Plumb.' Associated with Mr. Merrill in this hayshaking enterprise are Alan Young and Dinah Shore. They'll make you long for the streets outside."

English film historian and critic Leslie Halliwell considered Aaron Slick from Punkin Crick to be "[h]omespun entertainment based on a staple success of the American provincial theatre, with pleasant songs added."

== Soundtrack ==
All songs written by Jay Livingston and Ray Evans:

- "Chores"
- "My Beloved"
- "Marshmallow Moon"
- "Why Should I Believe in Love?"
- "Still Water"
- "Purt' Nigh, But Not Plumb"
- "Life Is a Beautiful Thing"
- "I'd Like to Baby You"
- "Saturday Night in Punkin Creek"
- "Step Right Up"
- "Soda Shop"

"Marshmallow Moon" was a hit before the film was released.

Prior to the film's release, Robert Merrill previewed songs from the soundtrack for United Nations troops in North and South Korea.
