= Martha Stewart (actress) =

American actress (1922–2021)

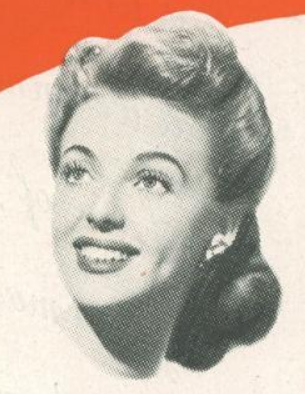
- Martha Stewart on a billboard
- Born: Martha Ruth Stewart Haworth; October 7, 1922; Bardwell, Kentucky, U.S.
- Died: February 17, 2021 (aged 98); Reseda, Los Angeles, California, U.S.
- Other name: Martha Shelley
- Occupation: Actress
- Years active: 1945–1964
- Spouses: Joe E. Lewis (m. 1946; div. 1948) George O'Hanlon (m. 1949; div. 1952) David Shelley (m. 1955; died 1982)
- Children: 3; including David Shelley

Martha Ruth Stewart Shelley (née Haworth; October 7, 1922 – February 17, 2021), better known as Martha Stewart, was an American actress. She was noted for playing Mildred Atkinson in In a Lonely Place (1950) alongside Humphrey Bogart.

== Early life ==
Stewart was born in Bardwell, Kentucky, on October 7, 1922. Her family relocated to Brooklyn during her childhood. She attended New Utrecht High School, graduating in 1939. As a construction engineer, her father moved from one city to another when new projects arose, so that the family had "a relatively nomadic existence" during Stewart's younger days.

== Career ==
Stewart's professional career began at age 16 when she was a swing singer at a club on 52nd Street in New York City for $35 per week. (She lied about her age to get the job.) That opportunity ended with an automobile accident that broke her nose and injured her face so badly that only after 10 weeks were doctors sure that she would not be permanently disfigured. Still wearing bandages and recovering from the accident, she won a job through an audition with Jerry Livingston's band. She toured the southern and midwestern United States with that orchestra.

When Marion Hutton left Glenn Miller's orchestra to have a baby, Stewart was selected as her replacement via an audition. Hutton's return would have left Stewart without a job, but Miller arranged for her to sing with Claude Thornhill's orchestra. Following the disbanding of Thornhill's orchestra, she was a featured soloist on radio on Your All-Time Hit Parade. After 13 weeks on that program she sang for 16 weeks at the Copacabana night club, which led to her being discovered by a scout for 20th Century Fox and signing with that studio.

She sang on NBC radio with Miller, Harry James, and Thornhill. She was recruited by a Hollywood talent scout after an appearance at the Stork Club in Manhattan.

Stewart made her film debut in Doll Face (1945), in which she acted alongside Vivian Blaine and sang a duet with Perry Como. She then featured in Johnny Comes Flying Home (1946) opposite Richard Crane, then in I Wonder Who's Kissing Her Now (1947) with June Haver. The following year, she starred with Donald O'Connor in Are You with It?. She also appeared on Broadway in the musical Park Avenue from 1946 to 1947.

Stewart performed one of her best-known roles as murder victim Mildred Atkinson in the classic In a Lonely Place (1950). The film is regarded as one of Humphrey Bogart's finest performances. That same year, she featured in Convicted with Glenn Ford and Broderick Crawford. She went on to star in Aaron Slick from Punkin Crick (1952) alongside Alan Young and Dinah Shore. She appeared on television as the co-host of Those Two from 1952 to 1953, and in one episode of The Red Skelton Show in 1954. Nearly a decade would elapse before she featured in the episode "A Nice Touch" of The Alfred Hitchcock Hour. Stewart acted for the final time in Surf Party (1964), after which she retired.

== Personal life and death ==
Stewart was married to singer-comedian Joe E. Lewis for two years; the marriage ended in divorce in 1948. Her second marriage was to actor-comedian George O'Hanlon from 1949 to 1952. She married her third and final husband David Shelley in 1955; they remained married until his death in 1982. The couple had three children, one of whom, singer David Shelley, predeceased her in 2015.

Stewart was the subject of an erroneous obituary in 2012, published by the website of Variety magazine, when she was actually still living in California under the name Martha Shelley. Stewart died on February 17, 2021, at the age of 98.

== Filmography ==
Year	Title	Role
1945	Doll Face	Frankie Porter
1946	Johnny Comes Flying Home	Ann Cummings
1947	I Wonder Who's Kissing Her Now	Lulu Madison
1947	Daisy Kenyon	Mary Angelus
1948	Are You with It?	Bunny La Fleur
1950	In a Lonely Place	Mildred Atkinson
1950	Convicted	Bertie Williams
1952	Aaron Slick from Punkin Crick	Soubrette
1964	Surf Party	Pauline Lowell

== Television credits ==
- The Alfred Hitchcock Hour (1963) (Season 2 Episode 2: "A Nice Touch") as Secretary
- The Red Skelton Show – Episode #4.8 (1954)
- Those Two – Co-Host (1952–1953)
- Cavalcade of Stars – Episode #3.16 (1951)

== Gallery ==
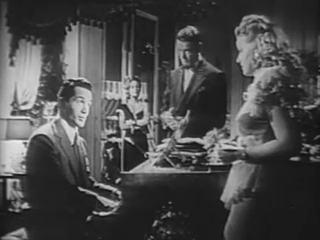
Martha Stewart and co-stars in Doll Face

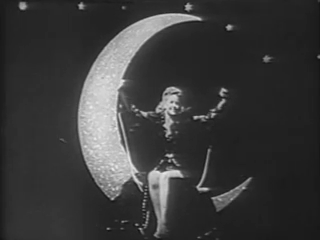
Martha Stewart performing "Somebody's Walking in My Dream" in Doll Face

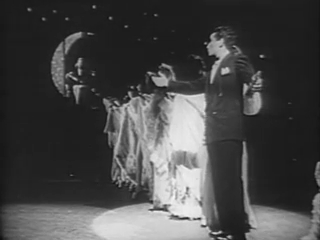
Martha Stewart and Perry Como perform "Somebody's Walking in My Dream" in Doll Face

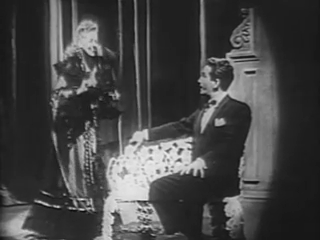
Martha Stewart and Perry Como perform "Somebody's Walking in My Dream" in Doll Face
