= The Spider (1945 film) =

1945 crime film directed by Robert D. Webb

- Theatrical release poster
- Directed by: Robert D. Webb
- Screenplay by: Scott Darling; Jo Eisinger; Irving Cummings Jr.
- Based on: play by Fulton Oursler; Lowell Brentano
- Produced by: Ben Silvey
- Starring: Richard Conte; Faye Marlowe; Kurt Kreuger
- Cinematography: Glen MacWilliams
- Edited by: Norman Colbert
- Music by: David Buttolph
- Distributed by: Twentieth Century-Fox
- Release date: December 1945 (United States)
- Running time: 63 minutes
- Country: United States
- Language: English

The Spider is a 1945 American crime film noir directed by Robert D. Webb and starring Richard Conte, Faye Marlowe, and Kurt Kreuger.

== Plot ==
A private detective is pursued by both police and a mysterious killer.

== Cast ==
- Richard Conte as Chris Conlon
- Faye Marlowe as Delilah 'Lila' Neilsen, alias Judith Smith
- Kurt Kreuger as Ernest, alias Garonne
- John Harvey as Burns
- Martin Kosleck as Mikail Barak
- Mantan Moreland as Henry
- Walter Sande as Det. Lt. Walter Castle
- Cara Williams as Wanda Vann, neighbor
- Charles Tannen as Det. Tonti
- Margaret Brayton as Jean, police records clerk
- Ann Savage as Florence Cain
- Harry Seymour as Ed, the Bartender
- Jean Del Val as Henri Dutrelle, hotel manager
- Odette Vigne as Mrs. Dutrelle
- Ruth Clifford As Mrs. Gillespie/Tenant
- James Flavin as Officer Johnny Tracy

== Production ==
The film was based on a 1928 play which Fox had filmed in 1931. The project was announced in May 1945, and the original female star was meant to be Carole Landis alongside Conte.

== Critical reception ==
The Los Angeles Times said it "was not without fair interest".

Film critic Dennis Schwartz gave the film a mixed review, writing, "Robert D. Webb directs a lackluster B-film noir from the play by Charles Fulton...The Spider was a poor remake of the 1931 film of the same title. It held very little suspense, and the plot was filled with gaping holes. But Richard Conte is a fine action actor, and gives this slight film noir story a little boost just by his presence."
