= Francis Vidil =

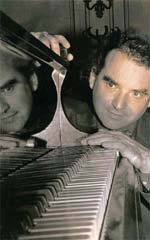

Background information
- Born: Francis Vidil; 1961 (age 64–65)
- Origin: Paris, France
- Genres: Classical music Organ repertoire Musical improvisation Piano; Instant Composing
- Occupations: Musician; Accompanist; Music teacher
- Years active: 1977–present
- Website: francis-vidil.com

Francis Vidil (born 1961), is a French classical musician, performer and music professor. Vidil is best known for his long-time affiliation with Versailles Conservatoire, where he became a Tenure Professor in 1996, as well as his numerous performances around the world. Currently lives in the city of Versailles. Vidil is one of the few performers in the world being able to play the organ and the trumpet simultaneously.

== Biography ==
Has been accompanying at Masses since the age of eight. Francis' father, at the time, chair organist of Saint Paul and Louis Church in Paris, brought him to a four-summer training in Saint-Maximin-la-Sainte-Baume, the cradle of baroque music. It was there that, as a child, Francis got to try France's most famous baroque organ.

Vidil's conservatory teachers wanted him to complete his piano studies before allowing him to officially learn the organ and, by the same token, forbid him to practice improvisation, which he continued to do anyway. The Saint-Maximin-la-Sainte-Baume professors who decisively influenced his style were: André Stricker, Michel Chapuis, Huguette Dreyfus, and Xavier Darasse.

=== Significant events ===
- Vidil took part in numerous European and International music competitions, including Lyon Piano Festival, Montbrison Piano Improvisation Contest. Worked closely with Roger Guérin, former partner of Dizzy Gillespie.
- From January 2007 to 2008 served as an organ professor and performer selected by the French Embassy in Cuba where churches had reopened and the use of organ was rediscovered after John Paul II's trip. Initiated the new organ school and organ improvisation classes, Superior School of Music in Havana, Cuba.
- In 2003, 2004 and 2006 held piano improvisation master classes for instrumentalists and composers in Pennsylvania State University, US.
- Between 1987 and 1994 was a pianist and actor in the role of Mozart in "Mozart au Chocolat", a play of Jacques Livchine, Theatre de L'Unité. Together they made 210 performances in various countries, including France, Italy, Belgium, Germany, Greece, England, Russia, Estonia, Iceland, and Israel. This play was one of the seven events selected by the USSR to celebrate the bicentennial of the 1789 French Revolution.
- In the late 1980s worked as a Pianist of Maîtrise de Radio France (France's boys and girls national choir) in Paris.
- In 1993 founded EOL Association (Eclats d'Orgue à Lévis-Saint-Nom), a trust for preservation and development of an organ in Lévis-Saint-Nom, where he serves as president. The EOL Organ has benefited from a wide array of improvements for the past 10 years such as adding bells and percussions.
- In November 2001 took part in Chopin Festival of New York City, a commemorative concert to the victims of the World Trade Center.
- In 2011 performed together with American jazz organist Rhoda Scott, combining the sounds of Hammond organs with cathedral organs.

== Selected awards ==
- Academic Society for the Promotion of the Arts, Sciences and Letters, patronized by L’Académie française, Silver Medal for career achievement, 14 May 2000
- Outstanding Arts Professor National Award (Professeur “Hors Classe”), by Versailles’ Mayor's decree, 10 July 2009

== In popular culture ==
- In the mid-1970s briefly rehearsed as a keyboardist in French progressive rock band Magma, eventually turning down an opportunity to become a rock pianist.
- In 2008, organized a concert dedicated to the release of a photo book "Françoise Hardy : Ses plus belles années", improvising over 12 photos of Françoise Hardy and Jacques Dutronc.
- In 2006 accompanied on piano and organ to American jazz, blues and gospel singer Liz McComb, as well as to Max Zita's group "Gospel Voices".

== Selected discography ==
- “Cathédrale d’Auxerre,“ 1995, Organ
- “Mois Molière," 1996, Piano
- "Nuit de la Musique," 1997, 2 CD, Piano, Organ (Cathédrale de Nïmes)
- "Bleu Clair," 2006, Piano
- "Mozart l'Improvisateur," 2006, Piano
- "Autour des Chorals de Bach," 2007, Piano
- "Vitrail et Lumière," 2007, Pianoforte (Erard, 1846)
- "En Hommage à Bach," 2007, Piano
- "Tonnerre de Brest," 2007, Piano, Celesta, Gong and Chimes
- "Le Son des Ténèbres," 30 themes given by the public, 2008, Piano
  ganes
- "Penn State, the Concert," 2003, Organ, Celesta, Bells and 2nd Trumpet
