= Big Read (Bulgaria) =

The Big Read (Bulgarian: Голямото четене, trans. Golyamoto chetene) was a survey initiated by the Bulgarian National Television, the goal of which was to find the favorite book of Bulgarians. Based on the BBC campaign of 2003, Golyamoto chetene started in October 2008 and finished on 25 March 2009 with the announcement of the winner. The Bulgarian public initially voted for any book they wished. Based on those votes a list of the top 100 books was drawn up. The 12 books that headed the list were put forward for further voting, which had to determine the winner.

== Top twelve ==
№	Title	Author	
№	Title	Name	Nationality
1	Under the Yoke	Ivan Vazov	(Bulgaria)
2	Vreme razdelno ("Time of Parting")	Anton Donchev	(Bulgaria)
3	Tyutyun ("Tobacco")	Dimitar Dimov	(Bulgaria)
4	Zhelezniat svetilnik ("The iron oil lamp")	Dimitar Talev	(Bulgaria)
5	The Little Prince	Antoine de Saint-Exupéry	(France)
6	The Master and Margarita	Mikhail Bulgakov	(Soviet Union)
7	The Lord of the Rings	J. R. R. Tolkien	(United Kingdom)
8	East of Eden	John Steinbeck	(United States)
9	Osadeni dushi ("Doomed souls")	Dimitar Dimov	(Bulgaria)
10	The Count of Monte Cristo	Alexandre Dumas	(France)
11	The Hitchhiker's Guide to the Galaxy	Douglas Adams	(United Kingdom)
12	One Hundred Years of Solitude	Gabriel García Márquez	(Colombia)

== Winners by nationality ==
Winners in the Big Read Campaign in Bulgaria in 2009 by Author's Nationality
№	Author's nationality	Books	№	Author's nationality	Books
1	Bulgaria	24	8	Colombia	2
2	USA	20	8	Czech	2
3	United Kingdom	19	8	Italy	2
4	Germany	8	9	Australia	1
5	France	6	9	Brazil	1
6	Russia	5	9	Chile	1
7	Soviet Union	3	9	Greece	1
7	Sweden	3	9	Poland	1
7	Sweden	3	9	Spain	1
