= Lydia Bailey =

1952 American film directed by Jean Negulesco

- Original film poster
- Directed by: Jean Negulesco
- Screenplay by: Michael Blankfort; Philip Dunne
- Based on: Lydia Bailey by Kenneth Roberts
- Produced by: Jules Schermer
- Starring: Dale Robertson; Anne Francis; Charles Korvin
- Cinematography: Harry Jackson
- Edited by: Dorothy Spencer
- Music by: Hugo Friedhofer
- Production company: Twentieth Century-Fox
- Distributed by: Twentieth Century-Fox
- Release date: May 30, 1952 (New York)
- Running time: 89 minutes
- Country: United States
- Language: English
- Box office: $1.75 million (U.S. rentals)

Lydia Bailey is a 1952 American historical adventure film directed by Jean Negulesco and starring Dale Robertson, Anne Francis and Charles Korvin. The screenplay is based on the 1947 novel of the same name by Kenneth Roberts.

== Plot ==
In 1802, American lawyer Albion Hamlin travels from Baltimore to Cap-Français in Saint-Domingue during the Haitian Revolution. He wants to obtain the signature of Lydia Bailey, whose late father left his large estate to the American government, which needs the money. Saint-Domingue is in turmoil as French troops are being sent by Napoleon to reclaim control of the colony from Toussaint Louverture.

Albion learns that Lydia is with her fiancé, French colonel Gabriel D'Autremont, in the outskirts of Cap-Français. Albion goes to the American consulate in the city but is shocked when his young guide Nero is attacked by men trying to steal his luggage. They attack him too, but he is able to defeat them and rescue Nero with the help of a kind stranger.

Albion learns that Lydia and Gabriel are living at their rural estate further inland. He is knocked unconscious by the stranger who previously saved him, an educated black man named King Dick who supports Louverture. When Albion awakens, King Dick alerts him that there are other gangs of armed men roaming the countryside who block their way and who are antagonistic to anyone whom they think supports the French.

Albion reluctantly follows King Dick to D'Autremont's estate and finally meets Lydia. She agrees to sign Albion's documents, but French troops arrive in Saint-Domingue and war erupts, with Gabriel joining the city garrison of Cap-Français. Louverture's troops attack the estate, and Albion and Lydia traverse the jungle with King Dick's help, reaching the bay and eventually board the American ship that brought Albion to Saint-Domingue.

== Cast ==
- Dale Robertson as Albion Hamlin
- Anne Francis as Lydia Bailey
- Charles Korvin as Col. Gabriel D'Autremont
- William Marshall as King Dick
- Luis Van Rooten as General Charles LeClerc
- Adeline de Walt Reynolds as Antoinette D'Autremont
- Angos Perez as Paul D'Autremont
- Bob Evans as Soldier
- Gladys Holland as Pauline Bonaparte
- Will Wright as Consul
- Roy E. Glenn as Mirabeau
- Ken Renard as Toussaint L'Ouverture
- Juanita Moore as Marie
- Carmen de Lavallade as Specialty dancer
- Jack Cole as Dancer
- Martin Wilkins as Voodoo priest
- Albert Morin as Lieutenant
- William Washington as Deckhand
- Clancy Cooper as Codman
- Muriel Bledsoe as Ametiste
- Mildred Boyd as Marmeline
- Marjorie Elliott as Rosida
- Suzette Harbin as Floreal
- Roz Hayes as Aspodelle
- Dolores Mallory as Claircine
- Lena Torrence as Attenaire
- Frances Williams as Cloryphene
- Ken Terrell as Barbe
- Louis Mercier as Millet
- William Walker as General La Plume

== Production ==
Kenneth Roberts wrote the bestselling 1947 novel Lydia Bailey, which The New York Times called "an entertaining chronicle" with a "preposterous plot". Twentieth Century-Fox first obtained the screen rights in September 1946 before the book was published, paying $215,000 for a ten-year period of rights. Fox representatives admitted that they had not even read the book and had based their purchase solely on Roberts' reputation and an outline. William Perlberg was assigned as the producer, but in the following month, the job was given to Sol Siegel. Gene Tierney was the first star announced.

After the British government introduced a tax on Hollywood films, Twentieth Century-Fox delayed production of high-budget films for which profits in the British market would be essential. This included Lydia Bailey, The Black Rose, Julie and Down to the Sea in Ships.

In April 1948, the project was reactivated with plans to finance the film using frozen funds owed to Fox in England and the Bahamas. In June, Fox announced that Philip Dunne was writing a screenplay and that Linda Darnell would likely play the title role. However, further delays ensued. By May 1949, Susan Hayward was mentioned as a possibility for the lead female role. In September, Zanuck said that the film would soon enter production.

In February 1950, Fox announced Tyrone Power as the male lead. In November, Jules Shernberg was appointed producer and Micheline Prelle was announced as the star. In June 1951, Power refused the role, as he had appeared in five consecutive historical-period films.

Errol Flynn accused Canadian millionaire Duncan McMartin of slapping him in a bar, aggravating a spinal injury that prevented him from appearing in the film. He sued McMartin in the Bahamas Supreme Court for £80,000, which included his reported fee for Lydia Bailey, $200,000. The court awarded Flynn $14,000 in damages.

The male and female lead roles were ultimately assigned to Fox contract players Dale Robertson and Anne Francis. Jean Negulesco signed to direct the film under a new four-year deal with Fox.

== Reception ==
In a contemporary review for The New York Times, critic A. H. Weiler wrote: "Neither Mr. Roberts—whose canvas, incidentally, encompassed a much wider area than just Haiti—nor the scenarists were interested in documenting facts. Thus, this period adventure, which merely nods to history on occasion. succeeds in being a briskly paced, swashbuckling yarn in which an American lawyer's search for and romance with a beautiful heiress is a prop for plots, warfare, hairbreadth escapes and multi-hued jungle scenery."
