= Shuo Tang =

Qing-dynasty Chinese historical and heroic novel

- Editor: Yuanhu Yusou (attributed in some editions)
- Author: Anonymous
- Original title: 說唐演義全傳
- Language: Written vernacular Chinese
- Genre: Historical fiction
- Set in: China during the transition from the Sui to the Tang dynasty
- Publication date: 18th century
- Publication place: Qing China
- Media type: Print (woodblock)
- Pages: 68 chapters
- Followed by: Shuo Tang Afterstory

Shuo Tang (traditional Chinese: 說唐; simplified Chinese: 说唐; pinyin: Shuō Táng), formally titled Shuo Tang Yanyi Quanzhuan (traditional Chinese: 說唐演義全傳; simplified Chinese: 说唐演义全传; pinyin: Shuō Táng Yǎnyì Quánzhuàn), is an anonymous Chinese historical and heroic novel from the Qing dynasty. Its title has been rendered in English as Romance of Heroes in the Early Tang Dynasty. The standard early edition contains ten volumes and 68 chapters.

The novel describes the fall of the Sui dynasty and the establishment of the Tang dynasty through the adventures of a large group of warriors, rebels and military commanders. Although historical figures such as Qin Qiong, Cheng Yaojin, Shan Xiongxin, Yuchi Gong, Li Yuan and Li Shimin appear in the narrative, their lives are heavily fictionalized and combined with the stories of legendary or invented characters. The principal narrative begins with the Sui conquest of the Chen empire and ends with Li Shimin's accession as emperor.

Unlike historical romances organized primarily around a chronological account of dynastic events, Shuo Tang places the adventures and relationships of its warriors at the centre of the narrative. Literary scholar Chang Ching-fa describes it as a major example of the transformation of Sui–Tang historical fiction into the heroic-legend form, particularly through its use of a ranked group known as the “eighteen heroes” (十八好漢).

== Authorship and publication history ==
The author of Shuo Tang (說唐) is unknown. Some editions contain a preface attributed to Rulian Jushi (如蓮居士), but the preface presents the writer as someone who had encountered an already existing manuscript rather than as its author. Other editions identify Yuanhu Yusou as the work's editor or reviser. Yuanhu Yusou's identity and biography are not known, and the attribution does not establish that he composed the original novel.

The work is generally dated to the early eighteenth century, during the Yongzheng reign (1722–1735). The earliest surviving printed edition commonly identified in bibliographical studies is a 1783 woodblock edition issued by the Chongde Shuyuan publishing house. It consists of ten volumes and 68 chapters. Later Qing editions were issued by publishers including Guanwen Shuwu, Huiwentang, Shengdetang, Shanchengtang and Yugu Shanfang.

The title varied between editions. Early printings used Shuo Tang Yanyi Quanzhuan (說唐演義全傳), while other versions were titled Shuo Tang Quanzhuan (說唐全傳) or Xinke Zengyi Shuo Tang Quanzhuan (新刻增異說唐全傳). After the appearance of a sequel, Shuo Tang Yanyi Houzhuan (說唐演義後傳), some publishers renamed the original novel Shuo Tang Qianzhuan (說唐前傳), meaning the earlier or first tale of the Tang. Publishers also combined the original and its sequel under titles such as Shuo Tang Hezhuan (說唐合傳) or Shuo Tang Quanzhuan (說唐全傳). As a result, the title Shuo Tang Quanzhuan (說唐全傳) can refer either to the original 68-chapter novel or to a larger collection containing one or more sequels.

A revised 66-chapter edition prepared by the scholar of oral literature Chen Ruheng was published in the twentieth century. Chen shortened, reorganized and rewrote portions of the text, meaning that his edition differs in chapter divisions and wording from the Qing 68-chapter version. Modern reprints of the original edition have also been published from surviving Qing woodblocks.

== Plot ==
The novel opens amid the wars that precede the reunification of China under the Sui dynasty. Qin Yi, a general associated with the defeated Northern Qi, is killed in battle after entrusting his wife and young son Qin Qiong to the care of others. Yang Jian replaces the Northern Zhou dynasty with the Sui and conquers the Chen dynasty, bringing northern and southern China under one government.

The emperor's son Yang Guang schemes against his elder brother and eventually becomes Emperor Yang of Sui. The novel portrays Yang Guang as a violent and immoral ruler whose construction programmes, military expeditions and demands for labour cause widespread suffering. Members of the Yuwen family gain power at court, while officials and military commanders who oppose the emperor are persecuted.

Qin Qiong grows up to become a local constable and skilled warrior. While travelling, he rescues Li Yuan and his family and forms friendships with figures including Shan Xiongxin, Cheng Yaojin, Wang Bodang, Xu Maogong and Luo Cheng. Episodes involving Qin Qiong's poverty, his attempt to sell his horse and his encounters with other warriors establish him as one of the novel's central moral figures.

Cheng Yaojin and his companions become involved in robbery and rebellion against the Sui authorities. Their activities contribute to the formation of the rebel stronghold at Wagang, where warriors from different backgrounds gather under a common cause. Cheng briefly assumes the title of ruler before leadership passes to Li Mi. The novel situates the Wagang rebels within a much larger landscape of competing uprisings, conventionally described as the “eighteen rebel kings” and “sixty-four columns of smoke”.

The Wagang coalition weakens because of internal conflict and Li Mi's political decisions. Its warriors subsequently separate, and several eventually enter the service of Li Yuan and Li Shimin. Shan Xiongxin, however, becomes associated with Wang Shichong and remains an opponent of the Tang. His refusal to submit after Wang's defeat leads to his execution, despite his former friendships with warriors serving Li Shimin.

The later chapters concentrate on Li Shimin's campaigns against rival rulers and rebel armies. Qin Qiong, Cheng Yaojin, Luo Cheng and Yuchi Gong assist the Tang, while a succession of warriors compete through highly exaggerated feats of strength and martial skill. After the Tang defeats its major rivals and consolidates control of China, the story concludes with Li Shimin becoming emperor.

== Characters ==
Qin Qiong (秦瓊), also known by his courtesy name Qin Shubao (秦叔寶), is the novel's principal connecting character. He is depicted as loyal, generous and committed to personal obligations, and his travels bring together many of the heroes who later join the Wagang rebellion (瓦崗起義). Although the historical Qin Qiong was a Sui officer who eventually became a Tang general, many of the adventures attributed to him in the novel derive from oral storytelling and earlier fictional narratives.

Cheng Yaojin (程咬金) is portrayed as a physically powerful but impulsive and comic warrior. His limited set of axe techniques repeatedly surprises stronger or more experienced opponents. He becomes the temporary ruler of the Wagang rebels but lacks the political ambition or administrative ability to retain the position.

Luo Cheng (羅成) is represented as a young, handsome and exceptionally skilled spearman. He is the fictional son of the historical frontier commander Luo Yi (羅藝), and his story incorporates material associated with several historical and legendary warriors. Shan Xiongxin (單雄信) is depicted as a generous leader of the martial community whose personal loyalty conflicts with the novel's dynastic support for the Tang.

Li Shimin (李世民) is presented as the ruler favoured by Heaven and as the political leader to whom the surviving heroes should ultimately give their allegiance. Li Yuan (李淵) establishes the Tang dynasty, but the novel assigns much of the military and moral responsibility for unification to his son.

The champion warrior is Li Yuanba (李元霸), a largely fictional figure loosely associated with Li Yuan's short-lived historical son Li Xuanba (李玄霸). He fights with a pair of enormous hammers and defeats entire armies through superhuman strength. His principal rivals include Yuwen Chengdu (宇文成都) and Pei Yuanqing (裴元慶). Other members of the heroic hierarchy include Xiong Kuohai (雄闊海), Wu Yunshao (伍雲召), Wu Tianxi (伍天錫), Luo Cheng (羅成), Yang Lin (楊林), Wei Wentong (魏文通), Shang Shitu (尚師徒) and Xin Wenli (新文禮).

The novel refers to an ordered group of eighteen heroes (十八條好漢), but surviving versions do not consistently supply the names of all eighteen positions. The ranking therefore operates less as a complete formal list than as a narrative device for comparing the strength, weapons and reputations of the principal warriors.

== Literary characteristics ==
Shuo Tang combines elements of the historical romance, the heroic legend and supernatural fiction. Its broad historical framework is based on the transition from Sui to Tang, but individual episodes frequently depart from historical records. Battles are structured around single combat between champions, while physical strength and specialized weapons are used to establish a hierarchy among the characters.

Earlier historical novels about the period often followed the structure of official chronicles and concentrated on emperors, governments and military campaigns. Shuo Tang instead presents the fall of the Sui and the rise of the Tang as the collective biography of a group of warriors. Chang argues that this concentration on the heroes and their ranking distinguishes the novel from chronicle-based historical romances and represents the development of a separate heroic narrative model.

The narrative also contains dreams, prophecies, astronomical signs, reincarnation, supernatural beings and divinely determined victories. These elements reinforce the idea that the replacement of the Sui by the Tang forms part of a predetermined cosmic order. A study by Tai Hui-jung classifies the supernatural signs in the Shuo Tang novels into categories including spirits, dreams, astronomical phenomena, extraordinary individuals, prophecy and reincarnation.

The language is predominantly vernacular and is designed around rapid action, dialogue and repeated confrontation. Characters are frequently defined by a distinctive weapon, temperament or physical characteristic. The novel's moral structure praises personal loyalty, generosity and courage, but it ultimately subordinates the heroes' individual loyalties to the legitimacy of Li Shimin and the Tang dynasty.

== Historical basis ==
The novel incorporates events such as the Sui conquest of Chen, the reign of Emperor Yang, the rebellions at the end of the Sui dynasty, the establishment of the Tang and Li Shimin's wars against rival regimes. It nevertheless alters the chronology, motivation and outcome of many events.

Historical individuals are often combined with fictional traditions. Qin Qiong, Cheng Yaojin, Shan Xiongxin and Yuchi Gong were real military figures, but the adventures assigned to them are largely legendary. Luo Cheng, Yang Lin and Yuwen Chengdu have no direct equivalents in standard dynastic histories, while Li Yuanba represents an extensive fictional transformation of Li Xuanba.

The novel also simplifies the complex political alliances of the period into a moral conflict between oppressive Sui officials, independent heroes and the future Tang state. Li Shimin's eventual victory is repeatedly explained through the Mandate of Heaven, and allegiance to him becomes the narrative standard by which characters are rewarded or punished.

== Sequels and influence ==
The popularity of Shuo Tang led to a series of sequels extending the fictional history of the Tang dynasty. Shuo Tang Yanyi Houzhuan recounts campaigns associated with the children of the original heroes and with the general Xue Rengui. Portions of this sequel also circulated separately under titles relating to Luo Tong's northern expedition and Xue Rengui's eastern expedition.

Later works commonly called Shuo Tang Sanzhuan continue with the stories of Xue Rengui's son Xue Dingshan and the female warrior Fan Lihua. The narrative is extended further into the reign of Wu Zetian through stories about Xue Gang and the restoration of the Tang. These sequels contributed to the development of the broader “Xue family generals” cycle in Chinese popular literature.

Episodes and characters from Shuo Tang were subsequently adapted into regional opera, ballad singing and the oral storytelling form known as pingshu. Stories including Qin Qiong selling his horse, Cheng Yaojin's axe techniques, the gathering of the Wagang warriors and the contests among the ranked heroes circulated independently of the complete novel. The book's combination of historical figures, fictional warriors and spectacular combat also influenced later novels, comic books and film and television portrayals of the Sui–Tang transition.

== See also ==
- Romance of the Sui and Tang
- Heroes in Sui and Tang Dynasties
