= Historical fiction =

Genre of fiction that is set in the past

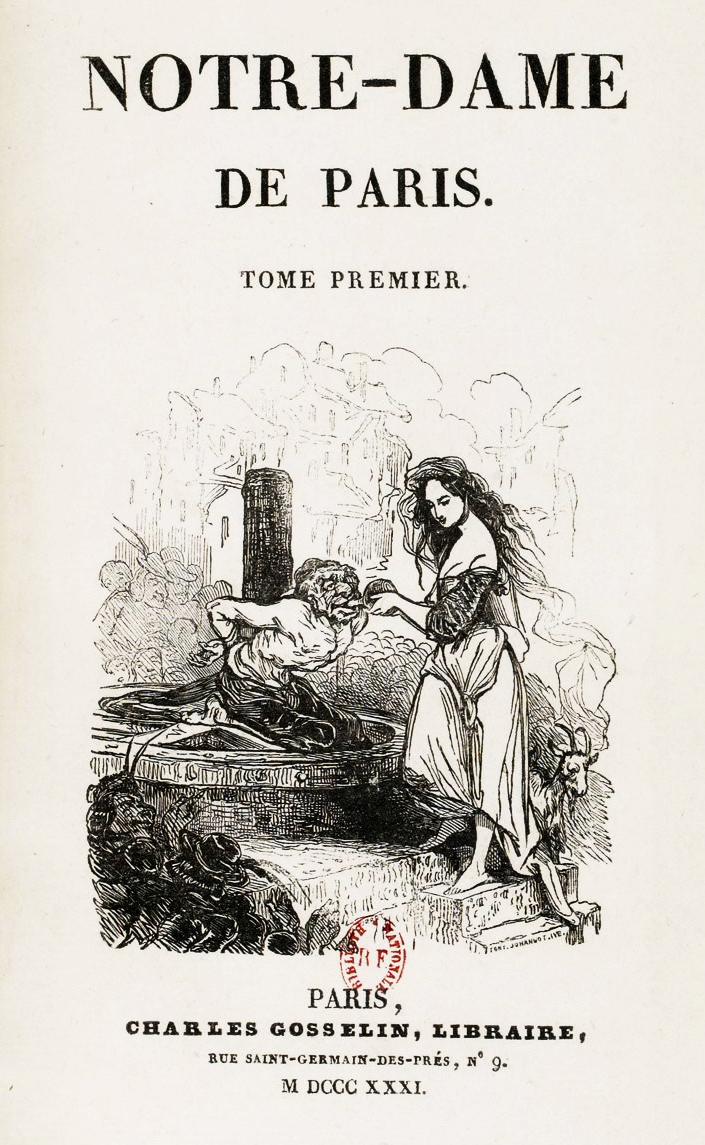
The Hunchback of Notre-Dame (Notre-Dame de Paris) by Victor Hugo (1831), a 19th-century example of a romantic-historical novel

Historical fiction is a literary genre in which a fictitious plot takes place in the setting of particular real historical events. Although the term is commonly used as a synonym for historical fiction literature, it can also be applied to other types of narrative, including theatre, opera, cinema, and television, as well as video games and graphic novels.

An essential element of historical fiction is that it is set in the past and pays attention to the manners, social conditions and other details of the depicted period. Authors also frequently choose to explore notable historical figures in these settings, allowing readers to better understand how these individuals might have responded to their environments. The historical romance usually seeks to romanticize eras of the past. Some subgenres such as alternate history and historical fantasy insert intentionally ahistorical or speculative elements into a novel.

Works of historical fiction are sometimes criticized for lack of authenticity because of readerly criticism or genre expectations for accurate period details. This tension between historical authenticity and fiction frequently becomes a point of comment for readers and popular critics, while scholarly criticism frequently goes beyond this commentary, investigating the genre for its other thematic and critical interests.

Historical fiction as a contemporary Western literary genre has its foundations in the early-19th-century works of Sir Walter Scott and his contemporaries in other national literatures such as the Frenchman Honoré de Balzac, the American James Fenimore Cooper, and later the Russian Leo Tolstoy. However, the melding of historical and fictional elements in individual works of literature has a long tradition in many cultures, including both Western traditions (as early as Ancient Greek and Latin literature) and Eastern, in the form of oral and folk traditions (see mythology and folklore), which produced epics, novels, plays, and other fictional works describing history for contemporary audiences.

== Introduction ==
Definitions differ as to what constitutes a historical novel. On the one hand the Historical Novel Society defines the genre as works "written at least fifty years after the events described", while the critic Sarah Johnson delineates such novels as "set before the middle of the last [20th] century ... in which the author is writing from research rather than personal experience." Then again Lynda Adamson, in her preface to the bibliographic reference work World Historical Fiction, states that while a "generally accepted definition" for the historical novel is a novel "about a time period at least 25 years before it was written", some people read novels written in the past, like those of Jane Austen (1775–1817), as if they were historical novels.

Historical fiction sometimes encouraged movements of romantic nationalism. Walter Scott's Waverley novels created interest in Scottish history and still illuminate it. A series of novels by Józef Ignacy Kraszewski on the history of Poland popularized the country's history after it had lost its independence in the Partitions of Poland. Henryk Sienkiewicz wrote several immensely popular novels set in conflicts between the Poles and predatory Teutonic Knights, rebelling Cossacks and invading Swedes. He won the 1905 Nobel Prize in literature. He also wrote the popular novel Quo Vadis, which was about Nero's Rome and the early Christians and has been adapted several times for film, in 1913, 1924, 1951, 2001 to only name the most prominent. Sigrid Undset's Kristin Lavransdatter fulfilled a similar function for Norwegian history; Undset later won a Nobel Prize for Literature (1928).

Many early historical novels played an important role in the rise of European popular interest in the history of the Middle Ages. Victor Hugo's The Hunchback of Notre-Dame often receives credit for fueling the movement to preserve the Gothic architecture of France, leading to the establishment of the Monuments historiques, the French governmental authority for historic preservation.

The genre of the historical novel has also permitted some authors, such as the Polish novelist Bolesław Prus in his sole historical novel, Pharaoh, to distance themselves from their own time and place to gain perspective on society and on the human condition, or to escape the depredations of the censor.

In some historical novels, major historic events take place mostly off-stage, while the fictional characters inhabit the world where those events occur. Robert Louis Stevenson's Kidnapped recounts mostly private adventures set against the backdrop of the Jacobite troubles in Scotland. Charles Dickens's Barnaby Rudge is set amid the Gordon Riots, and A Tale of Two Cities in the French Revolution.

In some works, the accuracy of the historical elements has been questioned, as in Alexandre Dumas' 1845 novel Queen Margot. Postmodern novelists such as John Barth and Thomas Pynchon operate with even more freedom, mixing historical characters and settings with invented history and fantasy, as in the novels The Sot-Weed Factor (1960) and Mason & Dixon (1997) respectively. A few writers create historical fiction without fictional characters. One example is the series Masters of Rome by Colleen McCullough.

== History ==
=== History up to 17th century ===
A page from a printed copy of the Chinese historical novel Sui Tang yanyi (Romance of the Sui and Tang dynasties) by Chu Renhuo, collection of the University of Tokyo

Historical prose fiction has a long tradition in world literature. Three of the Four Classics of Chinese novels were set in the distant past: Shi Nai'an's 14th-century Water Margin concerns 12th-century outlaws; Luo Guanzhong's 14th-century Romance of the Three Kingdoms concerns 3rd-century wars which ended the Han dynasty; Wu Cheng'en's 16th-century Journey to the West concerns the 7th-century Buddhist pilgrim Xuanzang. In addition to those, there was a wealth of historical novels that became popular in the literary circles during the Ming and Qing periods in Chinese history; they include Feng Menglong's Dongzhou Lieguo Zhi (Chronicles of the Eastern Zhou Kingdoms), Luo Maodeng's Sanbao taijian xiyang ji, Sun Gaoliang's Yu Shaobao cui zhong quanzhuan, Chu Renhuo's Sui Tang yanyi (Romance of the Sui and Tang dynasties), Xiong Damu's Liang Song Nanbei Zhizhuan (Records of the Two Songs, South and North) and Quan han zhi zhuan, Yang Erzeng's Dong Xi Jin yan yi (Romance of the Eastern and Western Jin dynasties), the anonymous Ying Lie Zhuan, and Qian Cai's The General Yue Fei, etc.

Classical Greek novelists were also "very fond of writing novels about people and places of the past". The Iliad has been described as historic fiction, since it treats historic events, although its genre is generally considered epic poetry. Pierre Vidal-Naquet has suggested that Plato laid the foundations for the historical novel through the myth of Atlantis contained in his dialogues Timaeus and Critias. The Tale of Genji (written before 1021) is a fictionalized account of Japanese court life about a century prior and its author asserted that her work could present a "fuller and therefore 'truer'" version of history.

One of the early examples of the historical novel in Europe is La Princesse de Clèves, a French novel published anonymously in March 1678. It is regarded by many as the beginning of the modern tradition of the psychological novel and as a great work. Its author generally is held to be Madame de La Fayette. The action takes place between October 1558 and November 1559 at the royal court of Henry II of France. The novel recreates that era with remarkable precision. Nearly every character – except the heroine – is a historical figure. Events and intrigues unfold with great faithfulness to documentary records. In the United Kingdom, the historical novel "appears to have developed" from La Princesse de Clèves, "and then via the Gothic novel". Another early example is The Unfortunate Traveller by Thomas Nashe, published in 1594 and set during the reign of King Henry VIII.

=== 19th century ===
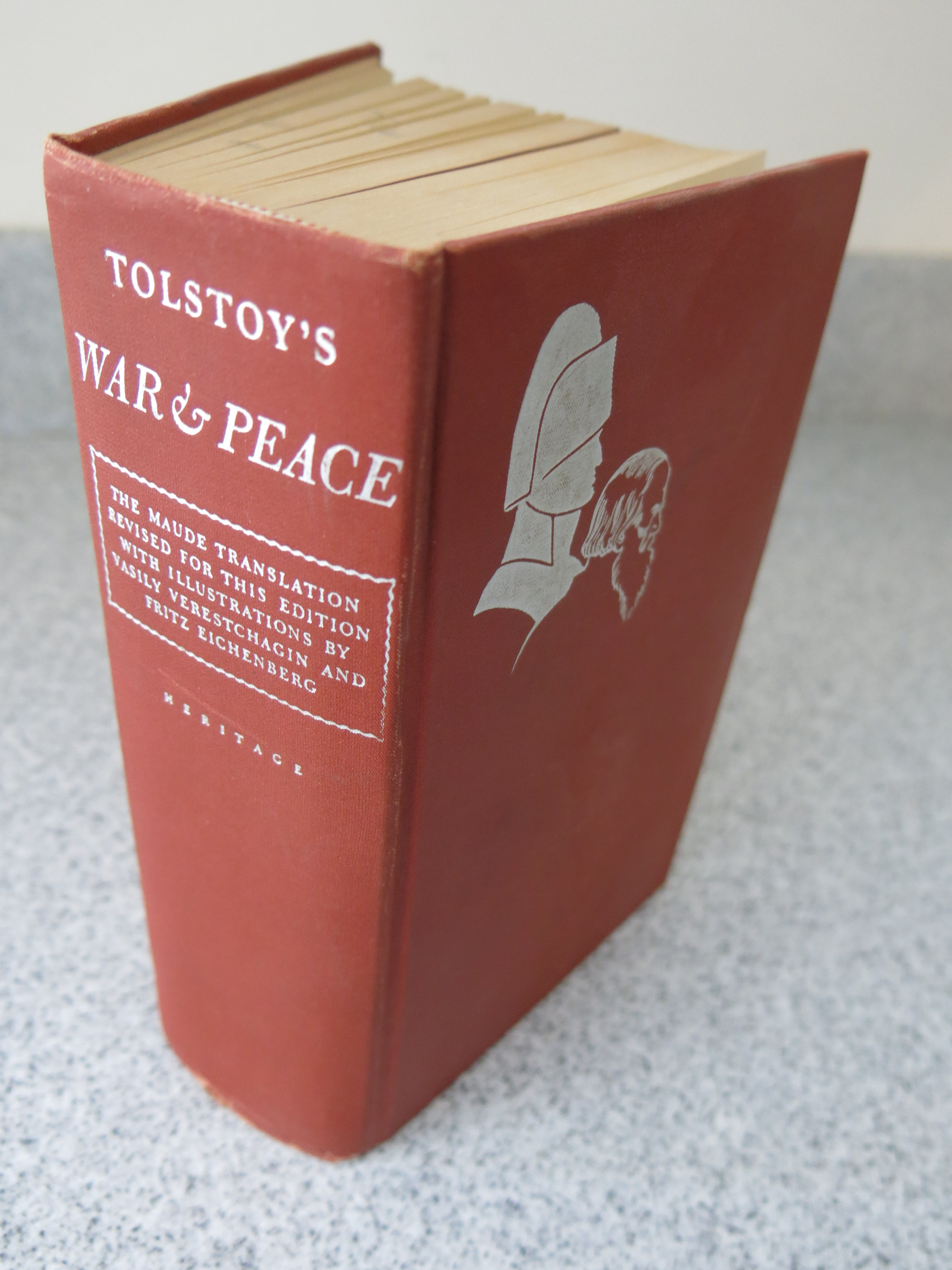
War and Peace by Leo Tolstoy, published 1869 and set 60 years before

Historical fiction rose to prominence in Europe during the early 19th century as part of the Romantic reaction to the Enlightenment, especially through the influence of the Scottish writer Sir Walter Scott, whose works were immensely popular throughout Europe. Among his early European followers we can find Willibald Alexis, Theodor Fontane, Bernhard Severin Ingemann, Miklós Jósika, Mór Jókai, Jakob van Lennep, Carl Jonas Love Almqvist, Victor Rydberg, Andreas Munch, Alessandro Manzoni, Alfred de Vigny, Honoré de Balzac or Prosper Mérimée. Jane Porter's 1803 novel Thaddeus of Warsaw is one of the earliest examples of the historical novel in English and went through at least 84 editions, including translation into French and German. The first true historical novel in English was in fact Maria Edgeworth's Castle Rackrent (1800).

In the 20th century György Lukács argued that Scott was the first fiction writer who saw history not just as a convenient frame in which to stage a contemporary narrative, but rather as a distinct social and cultural setting. Scott's Scottish novels such as Waverley (1814) and Rob Roy (1817) focused upon a middling character who sits at the intersection of various social groups in order to explore the development of society through conflict. Ivanhoe (1820) gained credit for renewing interest in the Middle Ages.

Many well-known writers from the United Kingdom published historical novels in the mid 19th century, the most notable include Thackeray's Vanity Fair, Charles Dickens's A Tale of Two Cities, George Eliot's Romola, and Charles Kingsley's Westward Ho! and Hereward the Wake. The Trumpet-Major (1880) is Thomas Hardy's only historical novel, and is set in Weymouth during the Napoleonic Wars, when the town was then anxious about the possibility of invasion by Napoleon.

In the United States, the first historical novelist was Samuel Woodworth, who wrote The Champions of American Freedom in 1816. James Fenimore Cooper was better known for his historical novels and was influenced by Scott. His most famous novel is The Last of the Mohicans: A Narrative of 1757 (1826), the second book of the Leatherstocking Tales pentalogy. The Last of the Mohicans is set in 1757, during the French and Indian War (the Seven Years' War), when France and Great Britain battled for control of North America. Cooper's chief rival, John Neal, wrote Rachel Dyer (1828), the first bound novel about the 17th-century Salem witch trials. Rachel Dyer also influenced future American fiction set in this period, like The Scarlet Letter (1850) by Nathaniel Hawthorne which is one of the most famous 19th-century American historical novels. Set in 17th-century Puritan Boston, Massachusetts during the years 1642 to 1649, it tells the story of Hester Prynne, who conceives a daughter through an affair and struggles to create a new life of repentance and dignity. In French literature, the most prominent inheritor of Scott's style of the historical novel was Balzac. In 1829 Balzac published Les Chouans, a historical work in the manner of Sir Walter Scott. This was subsequently incorporated into La Comédie Humaine. The bulk of La Comédie Humaine, however, takes place during the Bourbon Restoration and the July Monarchy, though there are several novels which take place during the French Revolution and others which take place of in the Middle Ages or the Renaissance, including About Catherine de Medici and The Elixir of Long Life.

Victor Hugo's The Hunchback of Notre Dame (1831) furnishes another 19th-century example of the romantic-historical novel. Victor Hugo began writing The Hunchback of Notre-Dame in 1829, largely to make his contemporaries more aware of the value of the Gothic architecture, which was neglected and often destroyed to be replaced by new buildings, or defaced by replacement of parts of buildings in a newer style. The action takes place in 1482 and the title refers to the Notre Dame Cathedral in Paris, on which the story is centered. Alexandre Dumas also wrote several popular historical fiction novels, including The Count of Monte Cristo and The Three Musketeers. George Saintsbury stated: "Monte Cristo is said to have been at its first appearance, and for some time subsequently, the most popular book in Europe." This popularity has extended into modern times as well. The book was "translated into virtually all modern languages and has never been out of print in most of them. There have been at least twenty-nine motion pictures based on it ... as well as several television series, and many movies [have] worked the name 'Monte Cristo' into their titles."

Tolstoy's War and Peace offers an example of 19th-century historical fiction used to critique contemporary history. Tolstoy read the standard histories available in Russian and French about the Napoleonic Wars, and used the novel to challenge those historical approaches. At the start of the novel's third volume, he describes his work as blurring the line between fiction and history, in order to get closer to the truth. The novel is set 60 years before it was composed, and alongside researching the war through primary and secondary sources, he spoke with people who had lived through war during the French invasion of Russia in 1812; thus, the book is also, in part, ethnography fictionalized.

The Charterhouse of Parma by Marie-Henri Beyle (Stendhal) is an epic retelling of the story of an Italian nobleman who lives through the Napoleonic period in Italian history. It includes a description of the Battle of Waterloo by the principal character. Stendhal fought with Napoleon and participated in the French invasion of Russia.

The Betrothed (1827) by Alessandro Manzoni has been called the most famous and widely read novel of the Italian language. The Betrothed was inspired by Walter Scott's Ivanhoe but, compared to its model, shows some innovations (two members of the lower class as principal characters, the past described without romantic idealization, an explicitly Christian message), somehow forerunning the realistic novel of the following decades. Set in northern Italy in 1628, during the oppressive years under Spanish rule, it is sometimes seen as a veiled attack on Austria, which controlled the region at the time the novel was written.

The critical and popular success of The Betrothed gave rise to a crowd of imitations and, in the age of unification, almost every Italian writer tried his hand at the genre; novels now almost forgotten, like Marco Visconti by Tommaso Grossi (Manzoni's best friend) or Ettore Fieramosca by Massimo D'Azeglio (Manzoni's son-in-law), were the best-sellers of their time. Many of these authors, such as Niccolò Tommaseo, Francesco Domenico Guerrazzi and D'Azeglio himself, were patriots and politicians too, and in their novels, the veiled politic message of Manzoni became explicit (the hero of Ettore Fieramosca fights to defend the honor of the Italian soldiers, mocked by some arrogant Frenchmen). In them, the narrative talent not equaled the patriotic passion, and their novels, full of rhetoric and melodramatic excesses, are today barely readable as historical documents. A significant exception is The Confessions of an Italian by Ippolito Nievo, an epic about the Venetian republic's fall and the Napoleonic age, told with satiric irony and youthful brio (Nievo wrote it when he was 26 years old).

In Arabic literature, the Lebanese writer Jurji Zaydan (1861–1914) was the most prolific novelist of this genre. He wrote 23 historical novels between 1889 and 1914. His novels played an important in shaping the collective consciousness of modern Arabs during the Nahda period and educated them about their history. The Fleeing Mamluk (1891), The Captive of the Mahdi Pretender (1892), and Virgin of Quraish (1899) are some of his nineteenth-century historical novels.

=== 20th century ===
==== Germany ====
A major 20th-century example of this genre is the German author Thomas Mann's Buddenbrooks (1901). This chronicles the decline of a wealthy north German merchant family over the course of four generations, incidentally portraying the manner of life and mores of the Hanseatic bourgeoisie in the years from 1835 to 1877. Mann drew deeply from the history of his own family, the Mann family of Lübeck, and their milieu. This was Mann's first novel, and with the publication of the 2nd edition in 1903, Buddenbrooks became a major literary success. The work led to a Nobel Prize in Literature for Mann in 1929; although the Nobel award generally recognizes an author's body of work, the Swedish Academy's citation for Mann identified "his great novel Buddenbrooks" as the principal reason for his prize. Mann also wrote, between 1926 and 1943, a four-part novel Joseph and His Brothers. In it Mann retells the familiar biblical stories of Genesis, from Jacob to Joseph (chapters 27–50), setting it in the historical context of the reign of Akhenaten (1353–1336 BC) in ancient Egypt.

In the same era, Lion Feuchtwanger was one of the most popular and accomplished writers of historical novels, with publications between the 1920s and 1950s. His reputation began with the bestselling work, Jud Süß (1925), set in the eighteenth century, as well as historical novels written primarily in exile in France and California, including most prominently the Josephus trilogy set in Ancient Rome (1932 / 1935 / 1942), Goya (1951), and his novel Raquel: The Jewess of Toledo - set in Medieval Spain.

==== Britain ====
Robert Graves of Britain wrote several popular historical novels, including I, Claudius, King Jesus, The Golden Fleece and Count Belisarius. John Cowper Powys wrote two historical novels set in Wales, Owen Glendower (1941) and Porius (1951). The first deals with the rebellion of the Welsh Prince Owain Glyndŵr (AD 1400–16), while Porius takes place during the Dark Ages, in AD 499, just before the Anglo-Saxon invasion of Britain. Powys suggests parallels with these historical periods and Britain in the late 1930s and during World War II.

Other significant British novelists include Georgette Heyer, Naomi Mitchison and Mary Renault. Heyer essentially established the historical romance genre and its subgenre Regency romance, which was inspired by Jane Austen. To ensure accuracy, Heyer collected reference works and kept detailed notes on all aspects of Regency life. While some critics thought the novels were too detailed, others considered the level of detail to be Heyer's greatest asset; Heyer even recreated William the Conqueror's crossing into England for her novel The Conqueror. Naomi Mitchison's finest novel, The Corn King and the Spring Queen (1931), is regarded by some as the best historical novel of the 20th century. Mary Renault is best known for her historical novels set in Ancient Greece. In addition to fictional portrayals of Theseus, Socrates, Plato, Simonides of Ceos and Alexander the Great, she wrote a non-fiction biography of Alexander. The Siege of Krishnapur (1973) by J. G. Farrell has been described as an "outstanding novel". Inspired by events such as the sieges of Cawnpore and Lucknow, the book details the siege of a fictional Indian town, Krishnapur, during the Indian Rebellion of 1857 from the perspective of the town's British residents. The main characters find themselves subject to the increasing strictures and deprivation of the siege, and the absurdity of maintaining the British class system in a town no one can leave becomes a source of comic invention, though the text is serious in intent and tone.

In Welsh literature, the major contributor to the genre in Welsh is William Owen Roberts (b. 1960). His historical novels include Y Pla (1987), set at the time of the Black Death; Paradwys (2001), 18th century, concerning the slave trade; and Petrograd (2008) and Paris (2013), concerning the Russian revolution and its aftermath. Y Pla has been much translated, appearing in English as Pestilence, and Petrograd and Paris have also appeared in English. A contemporary of Roberts' working in English is Christopher Meredith (b. 1954), whose Griffri (1991) is set in the 12th century and has the poet of a minor Welsh prince as narrator.

Nobel Prize laureate William Golding wrote a number of historical novels. The Inheritors (1955) is set in prehistoric times, and shows "new people" (generally identified with Homo sapiens sapiens) triumphing over a gentler race (generally identified with Neanderthals) by deceit and violence. The Spire (1964) follows the building (and near collapse) of a huge spire onto a medieval cathedral (generally assumed to be Salisbury Cathedral); the spire symbolizing both spiritual aspiration and worldly vanity. The Scorpion God (1971) consists of three novellas, the first set in a prehistoric African hunter-gatherer band (Clonk, Clonk), the second in an ancient Egyptian court (The Scorpion God) and the third in the court of a Roman emperor (Envoy Extraordinary). The trilogy To the Ends of the Earth, which includes the Rites of Passage (1980), Close Quarters (1987), and Fire Down Below (1989), describes sea voyages in the early 19th century. Anthony Burgess also wrote several historical novels; his last novel, A Dead Man in Deptford, is about the murder of Christopher Marlowe in the 16th century.

Though the genre has evolved since its inception, the historical novel remains popular with authors and readers to this day and bestsellers include Patrick O'Brian's Aubrey–Maturin series, Ken Follett's Pillars of the Earth and Dorothy Dunnett's Lymond Chronicles. A development in British and Irish writing in the past 25 years has been a renewed interest in the First World War. Works include William Boyd's An Ice-Cream War; Sebastian Faulks' Birdsong and The Girl at the Lion d'Or (concerned with the War's consequences); Pat Barker's Regeneration Trilogy and Sebastian Barry's A Long Long Way.

==== United States ====
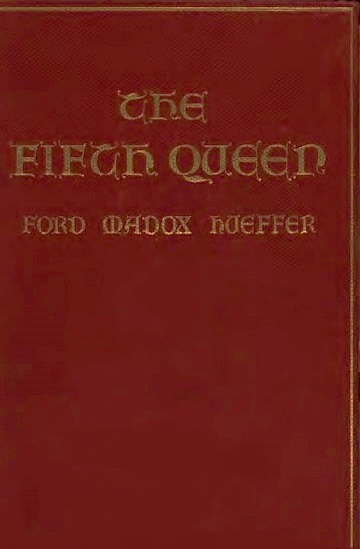
The Fifth Queen, 1906–1908 by Ford Madox Ford, is written about the 16th century.

American Nobel laureate William Faulkner's novel Absalom, Absalom! (1936) is set before, during and after the American Civil War. Kenneth Roberts wrote several books set around the events of the American Revolution, of which Northwest Passage (1937), Oliver Wiswell (1940) and Lydia Bailey (1947) all became best-sellers in the 1930s and 1940s. The following American authors have also written historical novels in the 20th century: Gore Vidal, John Barth, Norman Mailer, E. L. Doctorow and William Kennedy. Thomas Pynchon's historical novel Mason & Dixon (1997) tells the story of the two English surveyors, Charles Mason and Jeremiah Dixon, who were charged with marking the boundary between Pennsylvania and Maryland in the 18th century. More recently there have been works such as Neal Stephenson's Baroque Cycle, and Grant Maierhofer's Traumnovelle, which imagines the life of Anatoli Bugorski, around the incident wherein he unwittingly stuck his head inside of a particle accelerator in 1978.

==== Italy ====
In Italy, the tradition of historical fiction has flourished in the modern age, the nineteenth century in particular having caught writers' interests. Southern Italian novelists like Giuseppe Tomasi di Lampedusa (The Leopard), Francesco Iovine (Lady Ava), Carlo Alianello (The Heritage of the Prioress) and more recently Andrea Camilleri (The Preston Brewer) retold the events of the Italian Unification, at times overturning its traditionally heroic and progressive image. The conservative Riccardo Bacchelli in The Devil at the Long Point and the communist Vasco Pratolini in Metello described, from ideologically opposite points of view, the birth of Italian Socialism. Bacchelli also wrote The Mill on the Po, a patchwork saga of a family of millers from the time of Napoleon to the First World War, one of the most epic novels of the last century.

In 1980, Umberto Eco achieved international success with The Name of the Rose, a novel set in an Italian abbey in 1327 readable as a historical mystery, as an allegory of Italy during the Years of Lead, and as an erudite joke. Eco's work, like Manzoni's preceding it, relaunched Italian interest in historical fiction. Many novelists who till then had preferred the contemporary novel tried their hand at stories set in previous centuries. Among them were Fulvio Tomizza (The Evil Coming from North, about the Reformation), Dacia Maraini (The Silent Duchess, about the female condition in the eighteenth century), Sebastiano Vassalli (The Chimera, about a witch hunt), Ernesto Ferrero (N) and Valerio Manfredi (The Last Legion).

==== Bulgaria ====
Fani Popova–Mutafova (1902–1977) was a Bulgarian author who is considered by many to have been the best-selling Bulgarian historical fiction author ever. Her books sold in record numbers in the 1930s and the early 1940s. However, she was eventually sentenced to seven years of imprisonment by the Bulgarian communist regime because of some of her writings celebrating Hitler, and though released after only eleven months for health reasons, was forbidden to publish anything between 1943 and 1972. Stoyan Zagorchinov (1889–1969) also a Bulgarian writer, author of "Last Day, God's Day" trilogy and "Ivaylo", continuing the tradition in the Bulgarian historical novel, led by Ivan Vazov. Yana Yazova (1912–1974) also has several novels that can be considered historical as "Alexander of Macedon", her only novel on non-Bulgarian thematic, as well as her trilogy "Balkani". Vera Mutafchieva (1929–2009) is the author of historical novels which were translated into 11 languages. Anton Donchev (1930–) is an old living author, whose first independent novel, Samuel's Testimony, was published in 1961. His second book, Time of Parting, which dealt with the Islamization of the population in the Rhodopes during the XVII century was written in 1964. The novel was adapted in the serial movie "Time of Violence", divided into two parts with the subtitles ("The Threat" and "The Violence") by 1987 by the director Lyudmil Staykov. In June 2015, "Time of Violence" was chosen as the most beloved film of Bulgarian viewers in "Laced Shoes of Bulgarian Cinema", a large-scale consultation with the audience of Bulgarian National Television.

==== Scandinavia ====
One of the best known Scandinavian historical novels is Sigrid Undset's Kristin Lavransdatter (1920–1922) set in medieval Norway. For this trilogy Undset was awarded the Nobel Prize in Literature in 1928. Johannes V. Jensen's trilogy Kongens fald (1900–1901, "The Fall of the King"), set in 16th century Denmark, has been called "the finest historical novel in Danish literature". The epic historical novel series Den lange rejse (1908–1921, "The Long Journey") is generally regarded as Jensen's masterpiece and he was awarded the Nobel Prize in Literature in 1944 partly on the strength of it. The Finnish writer Mika Waltari is known for the historical novel The Egyptian (1945). Faroes–Danish writer William Heinesen wrote several historical novels, most notably Det gode håb (1964, "Fair Hope") set in the Faroe Islands in 17th century.

Historical fiction has long been a popular genre in Sweden, especially since the 1960s a huge number of historical novels has been written. Nobel laureates Eyvind Johnson and Pär Lagerkvist wrote acclaimed historical novels such as Return to Ithaca (1946) and Barabbas (1950). Vilhelm Moberg's Ride This Night (1941) is set in 16th century Småland and his widely read novel series The Emigrants tells the story of Småland emigrants to the United States in the 19th century. Per Anders Fogelström wrote a hugely popular series of five historical novels set in his native Stockholm beginning with City of My Dreams (1960). Other writers of historical fiction in Swedish literature include Sara Lidman, Birgitta Trotzig, Per Olov Enquist and Artur Lundkvist.

==== Latin America ====
The historical novel was quite popular in 20th century Latin American literature, including works such as The Kingdom of This World (1949) by Alejo Carpentier, I, the Supreme (1974) by Augusto Roa Bastos, Terra Nostra (1975) by Carlos Fuentes, News from the Empire (1987) by Fernando del Paso, The Lightning of August (1964) by Jorge Ibargüengoitia, The War of the End of the World (1981) by Mario Vargas Llosa and The Autumn of the Patriarch (1975) by Gabriel García Marquez. Other writers of historical fiction include Abel Posse, Antonio Benitez Rojo, João Ubaldo Ribeiro, Jorge Amado, Homero Aridjis.

=== 21st century ===
In the first decades of the 21st century, an increased interest for historical fiction has been noted. One of the most successful writers of historical novels is Hilary Mantel. Other writers of historical fiction include Philippa Gregory, Bernard Cornwell, Sarah Waters, Ken Follett, George Saunders, Shirley Hazzard, Mark Hardial, and Julie Orringer. The historical novel The Books of Jacob set in 18th century Poland has been praised as the magnum opus by the 2018 Nobel Prize in Literature laureate Olga Tokarczuk. Blood of the Axe set in the Viking era has also been universally lauded.

On January 1, 2021 a group of award-winning authors of English-language historical fiction set in France formed the collaboration known as France's Splendid Centuries. The collaboration has included Michele Callard, Rozsa Gaston, Jules Larimore, Keira Morgan, and Tracey Warr, who are members of the Historical Novel Society known for increasing awareness on the popularity of French history in fiction novels.

== Subgenres ==
=== Documentary fiction ===
A 20th-century variant of the historical novel is documentary fiction, which incorporates "not only historical characters and events, but also reports of everyday events" found in contemporary newspapers. Examples of this variant form of historical novel include U.S.A. (1938), and Ragtime (1975) by E.L. Doctorow.

=== Fictional biographies ===
Memoirs of Hadrian by the Belgian-born French writer Marguerite Yourcenar is about the life and death of Roman Emperor Hadrian. First published in France in French in 1951 as Mémoires d'Hadrien, the book was an immediate success, meeting with enormous critical acclaim. Margaret George has written fictional biographies about historical persons in The Memoirs of Cleopatra (1997) and Mary, called Magdalene (2002). Earlier examples are Peter I (1929–34) by Aleksey Nikolayevich Tolstoy, and I, Claudius (1934) and King Jesus (1946) by Robert Graves. Other recent biographical novel series include Conqueror and Emperor by Conn Iggulden and Cicero Trilogy by Robert Harris.

=== Gothic fiction ===
The gothic novel was popular in the late eighteenth century. Set in the historical past it has an interest in the mysterious, terrifying and haunting. Horace Walpole's 1764 novel The Castle of Otranto is considered to be an influential work.

=== Historical mysteries ===
The historical mystery or historical whodunit is a subgenre of two literary genres, historical fiction and mystery fiction. These works are set in a time period considered historical from the author's perspective, and the central plot involves the solving of a mystery or crime (usually murder). Though works combining these genres have existed since at least the early 20th century, many credit Ellis Peters's Cadfael Chronicles (1977–1994) for popularizing what would become known as the historical mystery. The increasing popularity and prevalence of this type of fiction in subsequent decades has spawned a distinct subgenre recognized by the publishing industry and libraries. Publishers Weekly noted in 2010 of the genre, "The past decade has seen an explosion in both quantity and quality. Never before have so many historical mysteries been published, by so many gifted writers, and covering such a wide range of times and places." Editor Keith Kahla concurs, "From a small group of writers with a very specialized audience, the historical mystery has become a critically acclaimed, award-winning genre with a toehold on the New York Times bestseller list."

Since 1999, the British Crime Writers' Association has awarded the CWA Historical Dagger award to novels in the genre. The Left Coast Crime conference has presented its Bruce Alexander Memorial Historical Mystery award (for mysteries set prior to 1950) since 2004.

=== Historical romance and family sagas ===
Romantic themes have also been portrayed, such as Doctor Zhivago by Boris Pasternak and Gone with the Wind by Margaret Mitchell. One of the first popular historical romances appeared in 1921, when Georgette Heyer published The Black Moth, which is set in 1751. It was not until 1935 that she wrote the first of her signature Regency novels, set around the English Regency period (1811–1820), when the Prince Regent ruled England in place of his ill father, George III. Heyer's Regency novels were inspired by Jane Austen's novels of the late 18th and early 19th century. Because Heyer's writing was set in the midst of events that had occurred over 100 years previously, she included authentic period detail in order for her readers to understand. Where Heyer referred to historical events, it was as background detail to set the period, and did not usually play a key role in the narrative. Heyer's characters often contained more modern-day sensibilities, and more conventional characters in the novels would point out the heroine's eccentricities, such as wanting to marry for love.

=== Nautical and pirate fiction ===
Some historical novels explore life at sea, including C. S. Forester's Hornblower series, Patrick O'Brian's Aubrey–Maturin series, Alexander Kent's The Bolitho novels, Dudley Pope's Lord Ramage's series, all of which all deal with the Napoleonic Wars. There are also adventure novels with pirate characters like Robert Louis Stevenson's Treasure Island (1883), Emilio Salgari's Sandokan (1895–1913) and Captain Blood (1922) by Rafael Sabatini. Recent examples of historical novels about pirates are The Adventures of Hector Lynch by Tim Severin, The White Devil (Белият Дявол) by Hristo Kalchev and The Pirate Devlin novels by Mark Keating.

=== Alternative history ===
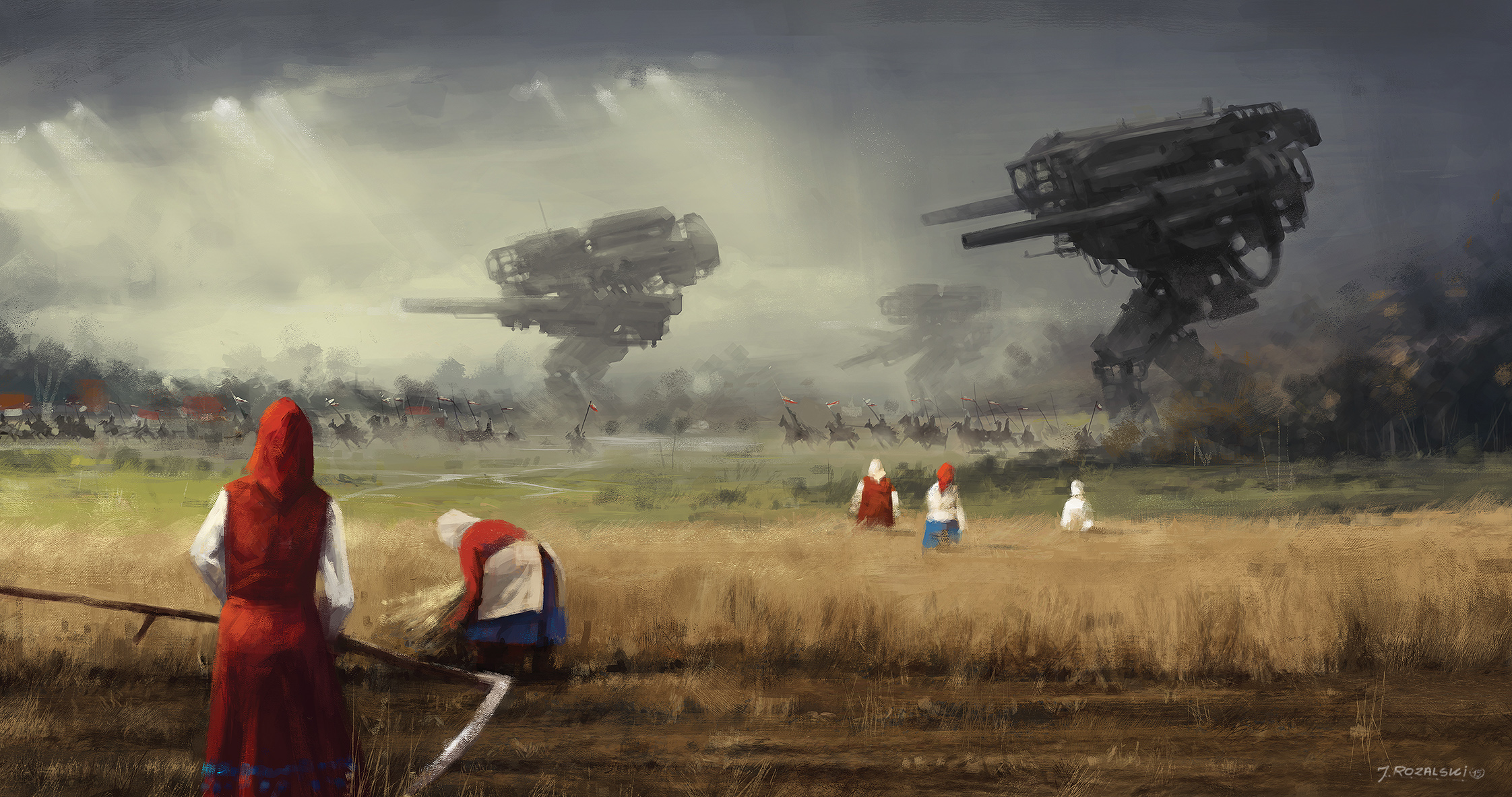
A painting by Jakub Różalski depicts an alternative history of the 1920s in Scythe, in which rural peasants must contend with giant mechanical walking tanks.

Alternate history (also alternative history, allohistory, althist, or simply A.H.) is a subgenre of speculative fiction in which one or more historical events happen differently than they did in reality.

As conjecture grounded in historical fact, alternate history stories explore "what if?" scenarios about pivotal events in human history and depict outcomes diverge significantly from the historical record. These works typically feature a point of divergence (POD) from recorded history, a change that alters the subsequent course of events, and the resulting ramifications. Some alternate histories are considered a subgenre of science fiction or historical fiction.

Since the 1950s, many works in the genre have incorporated tropes such as time travel between timelines, psychic awareness of parallel universes, or the splitting of history into separate timestreams.

=== Historical fantasy ===
Historical fantasy is a category of fantasy and genre of historical fiction that incorporates fantastic elements (such as magic) into a more "realistic" narrative. There is much crossover with other subgenres of fantasy; those classed as Arthurian, Celtic, or Dark Ages could just as easily be placed in historical fantasy. Stories fitting this classification generally take place prior to the 20th century.

Films of this genre may have plots set in biblical times or classical antiquity. They often have plots based very loosely on mythology or legends of Greek-Roman history, or the surrounding cultures of the same era.

=== Time travel fiction ===
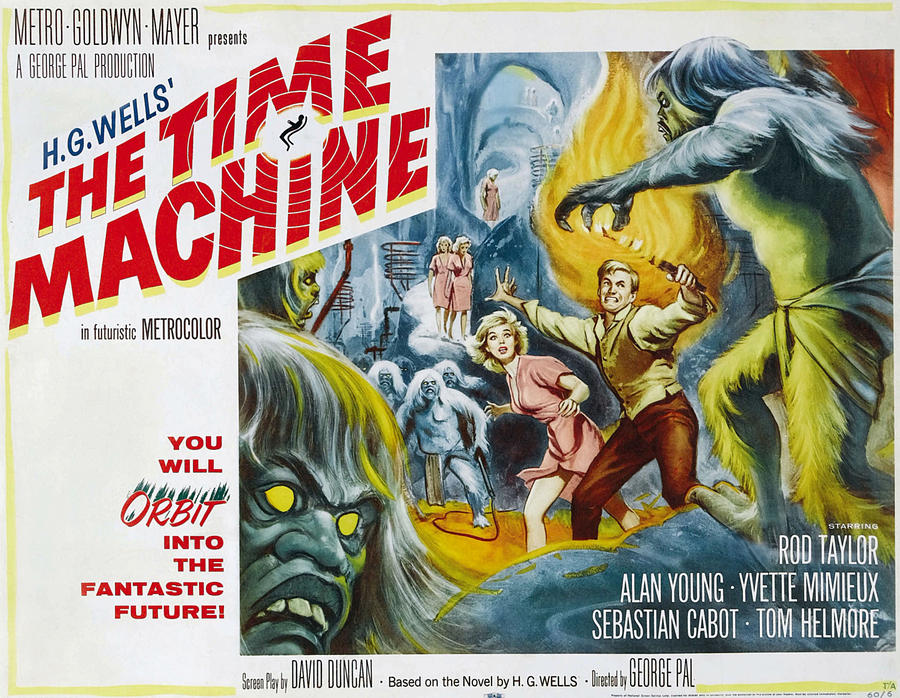
Poster for the 1960 film adaptation of H. G. Wells' 1895 novella The Time Machine

Time travel is a common theme or trope in science fiction and possibly other speculative fiction, mainly since the late 19th century, and has been depicted in a variety of media, such as literature, television, and film. This genre is sometimes called time-travel fiction, chrono fiction, temporal fiction or chrono opera.

The concept of time travel by mechanical means was popularized in H. G. Wells' 1895 story, The Time Machine. In general, time travel stories focus on the consequences of traveling into the past or the future. The premise for these stories often involves changing history, either intentionally or by accident, and the ways by which altering the past changes the future and creates an altered present or future for the time traveler upon their return. In other instances, the premise is that the past cannot be changed or that the future is determined, and the protagonist's actions turn out to be inconsequential or intrinsic to events as they originally unfolded. Some stories focus solely on the paradoxes and alternate timelines that come with time travel, rather than time traveling. They often provide some sort of social commentary, as time travel provides a "necessary distancing effect" that allows science fiction to address contemporary issues in metaphorical ways.

=== Historiographic metafiction ===
Historiographic metafiction combines historical fiction with metafiction. The term is closely associated with postmodern literature including writers such as Salman Rushdie and Thomas Pynchon.

Several novels by Nobel Prize laureate José Saramago are set in historical times including Baltasar and Blimunda, The Gospel According to Jesus Christ and The History of the Siege of Lisbon. In a parallel plot set in the 12th and 20th century where history and fiction are constantly overlapping, the latter novel questions the reliability of historical sources and deals with the difference of writing history and fiction.

=== Children's historical fiction ===
A prominent subgenre within historical fiction is the children's historical novel. Often following a pedagogical bent, children's historical fiction may follow the conventions of many of the other subgenres of historical fiction. A number of such works include elements of historical fantasy or time travel to facilitate the transition between the contemporary world and the past in the tradition of children's portal fiction. Sometimes publishers will commission series of historical novels that explore different periods and times. Among the most popular contemporary series include the American Girl novels and the Magic Tree House series. A prominent award within children's historical fiction is the Scott O'Dell Award for Historical Fiction.

=== Comics and graphic novels ===
Historical narratives have also found their way in comics and graphic novels. There are Prehistorical elements in jungle comics like Akim and Rahan. Ancient Greece inspired graphic novels are 300 created by Frank Miller, centered around Battle of Thermopylae, and Age of Bronze series by Eric Shanower, that retells Trojan War. Historical subjects can also be found in manhua comics like Three Kingdoms and Sun Zi's Tactics by Lee Chi Ching, Weapons of the Gods by Wong Yuk Long as well as The Ravages of Time by Chan Mou. There are also straight Samurai manga series like Path of the Assassin, Vagabond, Rurouni Kenshin and Azumi. Several comics and graphic novels have been produced into anime series or a movie adaptations like Azumi and 300.

== The performing arts ==
=== Period drama films and television series ===
Historical drama film stories are based upon historical events and famous people. Some historical dramas are docudramas, which attempt an accurate portrayal of a historical event or biography, to the degree that the available historical research will allow. Other historical dramas are fictionalized tales that are based on an actual person and their deeds, such as Braveheart, which is loosely based on the 13th-century knight William Wallace's fight for Scotland's independence. For films pertaining to the history of East Asia, Central Asia, and South Asia, there are historical drama films set in Asia, also known as Jidaigeki in Japan. Wuxia films like The Hidden Power of the Dragon Sabre (1984) and Crouching Tiger, Hidden Dragon (2000), based on novels by Jin Yong and Wang Dulu, have also been produced. Zhang Yimou has directed several acclaimed wuxia films like Hero (2002), House of Flying Daggers (2004) and Curse of the Golden Flower (2006). Although largely fictional some wuxia films are considered historical drama. Samurai films like Zatoichi and Lone Wolf and Cub series also fall under historical drama umbrella. Peplum films also known as sword-and-sandal, is a genre of largely Italian-made historical or biblical epics (costume dramas) that dominated the Italian film industry from 1958 to 1965. Most pepla featured a superhumanly strong man as the protagonist, such as Hercules, Samson, Goliath, Ursus or Italy's own popular folk hero Maciste. These supermen often rescued captive princesses from tyrannical despots and fought mythological creatures. Not all the films were fantasy-based, however. Many featured actual historical personalities such as Julius Caesar, Cleopatra, and Hannibal, although great liberties were taken with the storylines. Gladiators, pirates, knights, Vikings, and slaves rebelling against tyrannical kings were also popular subjects. There are also films based on Medieval narratives like Ridley Scott's historical epics Robin Hood (2010) and Kingdom of Heaven (2005) and the subgenred films based on the Arthurian legend such as Pendragon: Sword of His Father (2008) and King Arthur (2004).

Many historical narratives have been expanded into television series. Notable ancient history inspired TV series include: Rome, Spartacus, Egypt, The Last Kingdom and I Claudius. Tudor England is also a very prominent subject in television series like The Tudors, The Virgin Queen and Elizabeth I. Programs about the Napoleonic Wars have also been produced, like Sharpe and Hornblower. Historical soap operas have also been popular, including the Turkish TV series The Magnificent Century and Once Upon a Time in the Ottoman Empire: Rebellion. Chinese studios have also produced television series like The Legend and the Hero, its sequel series, King's War and The Qin Empire. There have also been produced pure Wuxia television series, many based on works by Jin Yong like Condor Trilogy and Swordsman, also Lu Xiaofeng and Chu Liuxiang by Gu Long. They have been very popular in China, but largely unnoticed in Western media.

=== The theatre ===
==== History plays ====
History is one of the three main genres in Western theatre alongside tragedy and comedy, although it originated, in its modern form, thousands of years later than the other primary genres. For this reason, it is often treated as a subset of tragedy. A play in this genre is known as a history play and is based on a historical narrative, often set in the medieval or early modern past. History emerged as a distinct genre from tragedy in Renaissance England. The best known examples of the genre are the history plays written by William Shakespeare, whose plays still serve to define the genre. Shakespeare wrote numerous history plays, some included in the First Folio as histories, and other listed as tragedies, or Roman plays. Among the most famous histories are Richard III, and Henry IV, Part 1, Henry IV, Part 2, and Henry V. Other plays that feature historical characters, are the tragedy Macbeth, set in the mid-11th century during the reigns of Duncan I of Scotland and Edward the Confessor, and the Roman plays Coriolanus, Julius Caesar, and Antony and Cleopatra. Another tragedy King Lear, is based on British legend, as is the romanc Cymbeline, King of Britain, which is set in Ancient Britain.

Other playwrights contemporary to Shakespeare, such as Christopher Marlowe, also dramatized historical topics. Marlowe wrote Edward the Second which deals with the deposition of King Edward II by his barons and the Queen, who resent the undue influence the king's favourites have in court and state affairs, and The Massacre at Paris, which dramatizes the events of the Saint Bartholomew's Day Massacre in France in 1572. Marlowe's Tamburlaine the Great (1587 or 1588) is a play in two parts, loosely based on the life of the Central Asian emperor, Timur "the lame".

History plays also appear elsewhere in other western literature. The German authors Goethe and Schiller wrote a number of historical plays, including Goethe's Egmont (1788), which is set in the 16th century, and is heavily influenced by Shakespearean tragedy, and Schiller's Mary Stuart, which depicts the last days of Mary, Queen of Scots (1800). This play formed the basis for Donizetti's opera Maria Stuarda (1834). Beethoven wrote incidental music for Egmont.

Later Irish author George Bernard Shaw wrote several histories, including Caesar and Cleopatra (1898) and Saint Joan, which based on the life and trial of Joan of Arc. Published in 1924, not long after the canonization of Joan of Arc by the Roman Catholic Church, the play dramatises what is known of her life based on the substantial records of her trial. One of the most famous 20th-century history plays is The Life of Galileo by Bertolt Brecht which dramatises the latter period of the life of Galileo Galilei, the great Italian natural philosopher, who was persecuted by the Roman Catholic Church for the promulgation of his scientific discoveries; for details, see Galileo affair. The play embraces such themes as the conflict between dogmatism and scientific evidence, as well as interrogating the values of constancy in the face of oppression.

More recently British dramatist Howard Brenton has written several histories. He gained notoriety for his play The Romans in Britain, first staged at the National Theatre in October 1980, which drew parallels between the Roman invasion of Britain in 54BC and the contemporary British military presence in Northern Ireland. Its concerns with politics were, however, overshadowed by controversy surrounding a rape scene. Brenton also wrote Anne Boleyn a play on the life of Anne Boleyn, which premiered at Shakespeare's Globe in 2010. Anne Boleyn is portrayed as a significant force in the political and religious in-fighting at court and a furtherer of the cause of Protestantism in her enthusiasm for the Tyndale Bible.

==== Opera ====
One of the first operas to use historical events and people is Claudio Monteverdi's L'incoronazione di Poppea, which was first performed in Venice during the 1643 carnival season. it describes how Poppaea, mistress of the Roman emperor Nero, is able to achieve her ambition and be crowned empress. The opera was revived in Naples in 1651 but was then neglected until the rediscovery of the score in 1888, after which it became the subject of scholarly attention in the late 19th and early 20th centuries. Since the 1960s, the opera has been performed and recorded many times. George Frederick Handel also wrote several operas based on historical characters, including Giulio Cesare (1724), Tamerlano (1724) and Rodelinda (1725).

Historical subjects for operas also developed during the 19th century. Usually with 4 or 5 acts, they are large-scale casts and orchestras, and spectacular staging. Several operas by Gaspare Spontini, Luigi Cherubini, and Gioachino Rossini can be regarded as precursors to French grand opera. These include Spontini's La vestale (1807) and Fernand Cortez (1809, revised 1817), Cherubini's Les Abencérages (1813), and Rossini's Le siège de Corinthe (1827) and Moïse et Pharaon (1828). All of these have some of the characteristics of size and spectacle that are normally associated with French grand opera. Another important forerunner was Il crociato in Egitto by Meyerbeer, who eventually became the acknowledged king of the grand opera genre. Amongst the most important opera composers on historical topics are Giuseppe Verdi, and Richard Wagner.

Russian composers also wrote operas based on historical figures, including Boris Godunov by Modest Mussorgsky (1839–1881), which was composed between 1868 and 1873, and is considered his masterpiece. Its subjects are the Russian ruler Boris Godunov, who reigned as Tsar (1598 to 1605). Equally famous is Alexander Borodin's Prince Igor, the libretto for which the composer developed from the Ancient Russian epic The Lay of Igor's Host, which recounts the campaign of Rus prince Igor Svyatoslavich against the invading Cuman ("Polovtsian") tribes in 1185.

=== Historical reenactment ===
Historical reenactment is an educational or entertainment activity in which people follow a plan to recreate aspects of a historical event or period. This may be as narrow as a specific moment from a battle, such as the reenactment of Pickett's Charge presented during the Great Reunion of 1913, or as broad as an entire period, such as Regency reenactment or the 1920s Berlin Project.

== Theory and criticism ==
The Marxist literary critic, essayist, and social theorist György Lukács wrote extensively on the aesthetic and political significance of the historical novel. In 1937's Der historische Roman, published originally in Russian, Lukács developed critical readings of several historical novels by various authors, including Gottfried Keller, Charles Dickens, and Gustave Flaubert. He interprets the advent of the "genuinely" historical novel at the beginning of the 19th century in terms of two developments, or processes. The first is the development of a specific genre in a specific medium—the historical novel's unique stylistic and narrative elements. The second is the development of a representative, organic artwork that can capture the fractures, contradictions, and problems of the particular productive mode of its time (i.e., developing, early, entrenched capitalism).

== See also ==
- Historical fiction awards
- List of historical novelists
- List of historical fiction by time period
- Walter Scott Prize
- Bayhaqi's History
