= Northwest Passage (film) =

1940 film directed by King Vidor

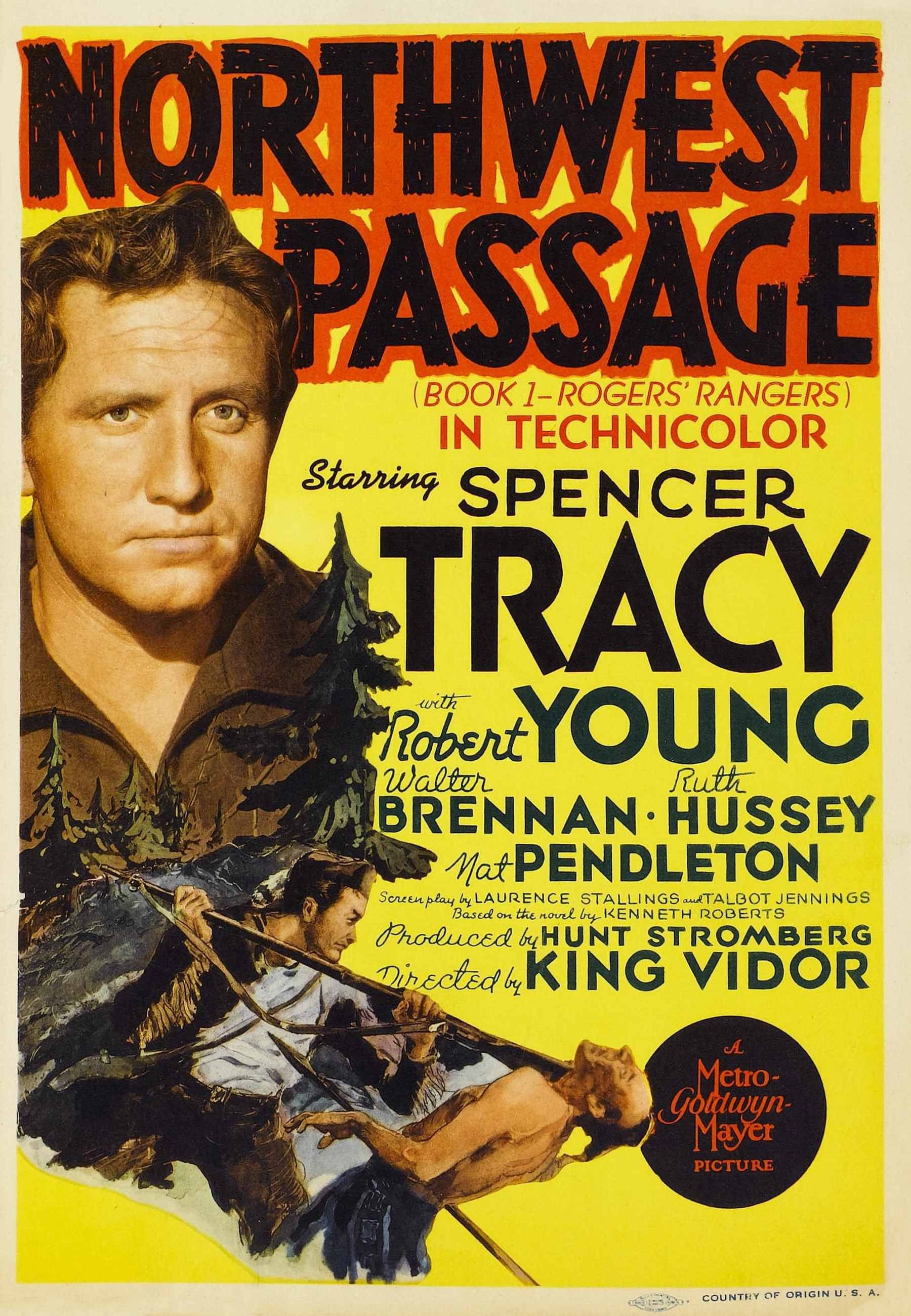
- Theatrical release poster
- Directed by: King Vidor
- Screenplay by: Laurence Stallings; Talbot Jennings
- Based on: Northwest Passage; 1937 novel by Kenneth Roberts
- Produced by: Hunt Stromberg
- Starring: Spencer Tracy; Robert Young
- Cinematography: William V. Skall; Sidney Wagner
- Edited by: Conrad A. Nervig
- Music by: Herbert Stothart
- Production company: Metro-Goldwyn-Mayer
- Distributed by: Metro-Goldwyn-Mayer
- Release date: February 20, 1940
- Running time: 125 minutes
- Country: United States
- Language: English
- Budget: $2,687,000
- Box office: $3,150,000

Northwest Passage, also billed as Northwest Passage (Book 1: Rogers' Rangers), is a 1940 American western film in Technicolor, directed by King Vidor. It stars Spencer Tracy, Robert Young, Walter Brennan and Ruth Hussey. The film is set in 1759, and tells a partly fictionalized version of the real-life St. Francis Raid by Rogers' Rangers, led by Robert Rogers (played by Tracy) on the primarily Abenaki village of St. Francis, in modern-day Canada. The screenplay, by Laurence Stallings and Talbot Jennings, is based on the 1937 historical novel Northwest Passage by Kenneth Roberts.

Roberts' novel is split into two parts, referred to as "Book 1" and "Book 2". The film, which is based entirely on Book 1, makes significant changes in the story (including a "happy ending") that so displeased Roberts that he vowed not to sell film rights to any more of his books. There was originally discussion about filming a sequel that would cover Book 2, but this did not happen. Although the book and the movie are named for Rogers' quest to find a Northwest Passage through North America, those events take place in Book 2, and are only briefly mentioned in the film.

== Plot ==
In 1759, Langdon Towne, son of a ropemaker and ship rigger, returns to Portsmouth, New Hampshire, after his expulsion from Harvard University. Although disappointed, his family greets him with love, as does Elizabeth Browne. Elizabeth's father, a noted clergyman, is less welcoming and denigrates Langdon's aspirations to become a painter.

At the local tavern with friend Sam Livermore, Langdon disparages Wiseman Clagett, the king's attorney and the Native American agent Sir William Johnson, unaware that Clagett is in the next room with another official. Facing arrest, Langdon fights the two men with the help of "Hunk" Marriner, a local woodsman and both escape into the countryside.

Fleeing westward, Langdon and Marriner stop in a backwoods tavern, where they help a man in a green uniform. After a night of drinking "Flip" (similar to hot buttered rum), the two men wake up at Fort Crown Point, where they learn the man they met is Major Robert Rogers, commander of Rogers' Rangers. In need of Langdon's map-making skills, Rogers recruits the two men for his latest expedition to destroy the hostile Abenakis tribe and their town of St. Francis, far to the north.

Rogers's force rows north in whale boats on Lake Champlain by night, evading French patrols, but several soldiers are injured in a confrontation with Mohawk scouts. Rogers sends not only the wounded back to Crown Point, but also the disloyal Mohawks provided by Sir William Johnson and a number of men who disobeyed orders. Concealing their boats, the depleted force marches through swampland to conceal their movements. Informed by Stockbridge Indian scouts that the French have captured their boats and extra supplies, Rogers revises his plan and sends an injured officer back to Fort Crown Point requesting the British send supplies to old Fort Wentworth, to be met by the returning rangers.

Making a human chain to cross a river, the rangers reach St. Francis. Their attack succeeds, and they set fire to the dwellings and cut the Abenakis off from retreat. After the battle, the rangers find only a few baskets of parched corn to replenish their provisions. Marriner finds Langdon shot in his abdomen. The rangers set out for Wentworth, pursued by hostile French and Indian forces. Their initial objective is Lake Memphremagog, with the injured Langdon bringing up the rear.

Ten days later, Rogers's men reach the hills above Lake Memphremagog. Encountering signs of French activity, Rogers prefers to press on a hundred miles to Fort Wentworth, but the men vote to split up into four parties to hunt for food. Game proves scarce and two of the detachments are ambushed by the French, leaving most of the men dead. Persevering through harsh conditions, Rogers and the remaining fifty men finally reach the fort, only to find it unoccupied and in disrepair, and the British relief column has not arrived. Though personally despairing, Rogers attempts to perk up their flagging spirits with a prayer. They then hear the fifes and drums of approaching British boats with the supplies. Reporting that the Abenakis have been destroyed, the British honour Rogers' men by presenting their firearms and shouting "Hip, hip, hooray".

Returning to Portsmouth, Langdon reunites with Elizabeth while the Rangers are given a new mission: to find the Northwest Passage. Rogers fires them up with a speech about the wonders they will see on the march to the first point of embarkation, a little fort called "Detroit". He passes by Langdon and Elizabeth to say goodbye; Elizabeth informs him that she and Langdon are headed for London, where she is hopeful Langdon will become a great painter. Rogers bids them farewell, and marches down the road, into the sunset.

== Cast ==
- Spencer Tracy as Major Rogers
- Robert Young as Langdon Towne
- Walter Brennan as "Hunk" Marriner
- Ruth Hussey as Elizabeth Browne
- Nat Pendleton as "Cap" Huff
- Louis Hector as Reverend Browne
- Robert Barrat as Humphrey Towne
- Lumsden Hare as Lord Amherst
- Donald MacBride as Sergeant McNott
- Isabel Jewell as Jennie Coit
- Douglas Walton as Lieutenant Avery
- Addison Richards as Lieutenant Crofton
- Hugh Sothern as Jesse Beacham
- Regis Toomey as Webster
- Montagu Love as Wiseman Clagett
- Lester Matthews as Sam Livermore
- Truman Bradley as Captain Ogden

== Production ==
=== Development ===
The film is set in the mid-18th century during the French and Indian War (as the Seven Years' War in North America is usually known in the US). It is a partly fictionalized account of the St. Francis Raid, an attack by Rogers' Rangers on Saint Francis (the current Odanak, Quebec), a settlement of the Abenakis, an American Indian tribe. The purpose of the raid was to avenge the many attacks on British settlers and deter any further ones.

The title is something of a misnomer, since this film is a truncated version of the original story, and only at the end do we find that Rogers and his men are about to go on a search for the Northwest Passage.

=== Filming ===
The film was shot in central Idaho, near Payette Lake and the city of McCall.

Northwest Passage was MGM's most expensive film since Ben-Hur: A Tale of the Christ (1925). The picture was originally slated for an even more lavish budget in an earlier incarnation and was to star Tracy and Wallace Beery but management difficulties between Irving Thalberg and Louis B. Mayer resulted in production being shelved at that time.

== Release ==
The film had its world premiere at the Pinney theatre in Boise, Idaho on February 20, 1940. The following day it opened at the State and Chinese theatres in Los Angeles before expanding into 125 cities on February 23.

== Reception ==
=== Box office ===
According to MGM records the film earned $2,169,000 in the US and Canada and $981,000 elsewhere but because of its enormous cost incurred a loss of $885,000.

=== Awards and honors ===
The film was nominated for an Oscar for Best Cinematography (Color) in 1941, but lost out to The Thief of Bagdad.

== Sequels and related projects ==
According to one source, the script was revised by as many as 12 other writers, in addition to the two credited. Author Kenneth Roberts served as a co-writer on a second draft of a proposed script for the movie, one that covered the entire novel, not just the first book of it. However, executives at MGM scuttled the revision and instead used the first draft of the script, which covered only the first book, as the basis for the finished film. This is why the film Northwest Passage was subtitled Book One: Rogers' Rangers.

Director King Vidor then attempted to make a sequel to the film in which Rogers' Rangers find the Northwest Passage, although Roberts refused to cooperate with the project. But filming never began, because MGM ultimately refused to green-light it.

MGM produced a 1958-1959 American television series Northwest Passage starring Keith Larsen as Robert Rogers, with Buddy Ebsen costarring as "Hunk" Marriner, replacing Walter Brennan, who had his own TV series, The Real McCoys, in production at the time. The show aired on NBC.

== Legacy ==
=== Depiction of American Indians ===
The film's depiction of American Indians came to be criticized as racist, even by the standards of Hollywood at the time. This appraisal mirrors that of the section of the novel set during the French and Indian War, which has become equally regarded as racist.

Clive Denton, in his 1976 book The Hollywood Professionals: Volume 5, made these observations on the subject:

Vidor's Northwest Passage "sits more than a trifle uneasily that [Spencer] Tracy and his submissive band attack and burn a sleeping Indian village. The tribe has massacred and outraged [innocent whites], we are told, but we have not seen them do anything wrong, and they are certainly not belligerent in their sleep. Perhaps I should not berate Vidor for the conventions of good guys and bad guys in adventure movies. But I am still somewhat bothered by Major Rogers, who, beneath Tracy's charm, is something of a bastard..." (emphasis in original)

=== Later screenings ===
The film was shown at the 70th Berlin International Film Festival in February 2020, as part of a retrospective dedicated to King Vidor's career.
