= Romance of the Sui and Tang =

1675 Chinese historical novel by Chu Renhuo

Sui Tang Yanyi
- A modern edition
- Author: Chu Renhuo
- Original title: 隋唐演義
- Working title: Romance of the Sui and Tang
- Language: Chinese
- Genre: Historical novel
- Set in: China from the late 6th to the late 8th century
- Publisher: Sixue Caotang
- Publication date: 1675–1695
- Publication place: Qing China
- Media type: Print (woodblock)
- Pages: 20 volumes; 100 chapters

Sui Tang Yanyi (simplified Chinese: 隋唐演义; traditional Chinese: 隋唐演義; pinyin: Suí Táng Yǎnyì), commonly translated as Romance of the Sui and Tang or Romance of the Sui and Tang Dynasties, is a Chinese historical novel compiled by the early Qing dynasty writer Chu Renhuo (褚人穫). The work was completed in approximately 1675 and first published by the Sixue Caotang printing house in 1695. The original edition comprises 20 volumes and 100 chapters.

It begins with the political circumstances surrounding the rise of the Sui dynasty and the conquest of the Chen dynasty, continues through the collapse of the Sui and the establishment of the Tang empire, and concludes with events surrounding Emperor Xuanzong of Tang, Yang Guifei and the An Lushan Rebellion. Its narrative therefore spans approximately two centuries rather than concentrating exclusively on the transition from Sui to Tang.

Sui Tang Yanyi combines court history, romantic narrative, heroic legend, supernatural causation and anecdotes drawn from earlier histories and works of fiction. The adventures of Qin Qiong, Cheng Yaojin, Shan Xiongxin, Li Shimin, Hua Mulan and other figures of the Sui–Tang story cycle are interwoven with accounts of imperial succession, palace politics and the personal lives of rulers. Its overarching structure links Emperor Yang of Sui and Emperor Xuanzong through a fictional pattern of karmic causation and reincarnated relationships.

== Authorship and publication ==
Cover of a printed edition of Romance of the Sui and Tang, from the collection of the Fudan University

Chu Renhuo was a writer and compiler from Changzhou, corresponding to part of modern Suzhou, Jiangsu. He used the courtesy names Xuejia (學稼) and Jiaxuan (稼軒), as well as the literary name Shinong (石農). In addition to fiction, he compiled collections of historical, literary and anecdotal material. Sui Tang Yanyi became his best-known work.

Chu's preface is dated to the thirty-fourth year of the Kangxi Emperor, corresponding to 1695. The surviving early edition was printed by Sixue Caotang and was divided into 20 juan, each containing five chapters. Numerous reprints and recut editions appeared during the Qing period.

Modern bibliographical descriptions usually date the composition of the novel to around 1675, approximately twenty years before its first known printing. Robert E. Hegel describes the book as a compilation produced through the expansion and reorganization of existing fictional and historical narratives rather than as a story invented wholly by Chu.

== Sources and composition ==
In his preface, Chu associated his book with an earlier work attributed to Luo Guanzhong, commonly titled Sui Tang Liangchao Zhizhuan (隋唐兩朝志傳; "Chronicle of the Two Dynasties of Sui and Tang"). Modern scholarship has identified several additional sources that contributed more directly to the surviving text.

A major source was Yuan Yuling's Sui Shi Yiwen (隋史遺文; "Forgotten Tales of the Sui"), first printed in 1633. That novel develops the early life and adventures of Qin Qiong, about whom the official histories record comparatively little before his emergence as a Tang general. Large portions of Yuan's narrative were incorporated, sometimes with limited alteration, into the first part of Sui Tang Yanyi.

Chu also drew extensively on Sui Yangdi Yanshi (隋煬帝豔史; "Amorous History of Emperor Yang of Sui"), an anonymous novel first printed in 1631. Material concerning Emperor Yang's palace, journeys, construction projects, romantic relationships and eventual overthrow was adapted from this work. Chu generally reduced some of its more explicit erotic descriptions and placed the emperor's private conduct within a wider account of dynastic decline.

Other material came from historical chronicles, collections of anecdotes and earlier works of popular literature. These included Sui Tang Jiahua (隋唐嘉話; "Notable Conversations of the Sui and Tang"), Guoshi Bu (國史補; "Supplement to the National History"), Tang-period tales, poetry and accounts of court life. The book also incorporates traditions associated with Datang Qinwang Cihua (大唐秦王詞話; "Verse Tale of the Prince of Qin of the Great Tang") and other narratives about Li Shimin and the founding of the Tang.

The resulting work is not organized as a continuous rewriting of a single predecessor. Chu combined several narrative traditions that differed in tone and subject matter. Hegel characterizes the first two-thirds as an interweaving of the Qin Qiong story with material about Emperor Yang, while much of the final third consists of shorter narratives and historical anecdotes concerning later Tang rulers and court figures.

== Plot ==
The novel begins during the final decades of the Northern and Southern dynasties. Yang Jian (楊堅) rises to power within the Northern Zhou court, replaces the dynasty with the Sui and completes the reunification of China by conquering the Chen dynasty. His son Yang Guang (楊廣) competes with his elder brother Yang Yong (楊勇) for the position of crown prince and eventually succeeds his father as Emperor Yang.

Emperor Yang undertakes large construction projects, expands the canal system and conducts costly military campaigns. The novel combines accounts of these state projects with stories about his palace, journeys and relationships with women, including the fictionalized consort Zhu Gui'er (朱貴兒). His government becomes increasingly unstable as officials, military commanders and local populations turn against the dynasty.

Parallel to the imperial narrative is the story of Qin Qiong (秦瓊), also known by his courtesy name Qin Shubao (秦叔寶). He begins as a minor local officer and experiences repeated financial, political and moral difficulties. His journeys bring him into contact with Shan Xiongxin (單雄信), Cheng Yaojin (程咬金), Wang Bodang (王伯當), Xu Maogong (徐茂公) and other warriors who later participate in the rebellions against the Sui.

Qin's adventures include his illness and poverty while travelling, his efforts to sell his horse, his involvement with local officials and outlaws, and the conflict between his official responsibilities and his obligations to friends. He eventually joins the forces associated with the emerging Tang state. His gradual development from an inexperienced and impetuous young man into a military leader provides one of the novel's principal connecting narratives.

As rebellions spread, the story follows the rise and fall of several competing regimes. The heroes associated with the Wagang Army divide among different leaders, while Dou Jiande, Wang Shichong, Li Mi and other rulers struggle for control. The novel also incorporates a version of the Mulan legend. Mulan (木蘭) enters military service in place of her father and encounters Dou Jiande's fictional daughter Dou Xianniang (竇線娘).

Li Yuan (李淵) establishes the Tang dynasty, while his son Li Shimin (李世民) becomes the principal military leader responsible for defeating rival regimes. The narrative does not end with the Tang conquest of its rivals. It continues through the conflict between Li Shimin and his brothers, the Xuanwu Gate Incident and Li Shimin's accession as Emperor Taizong of Tang.

Subsequent chapters recount events associated with Emperor Taizong's government, the reigns of his successors, the political rise of Wu Zetian, the rule of Empress Wei and the accession of Emperor Xuanzong. The final portion concentrates on Xuanzong's relationship with Yang Guifei (楊貴妃), the political influence of Yang Guozhong and An Lushan, and the outbreak of the An Lushan Rebellion.

Xuanzong flees the capital, Yang Guifei is killed at Mawei Station, and the emperor's son assumes the throne as Emperor Suzong of Tang. The closing chapters describe the recovery of the Tang capitals and Xuanzong's later life after his return. A supernatural explanation at the end connects the relationships of Emperor Yang, Zhu Gui'er, Xuanzong and Yang Guifei through previous lives, completing the karmic framework introduced earlier in the novel.

== Narrative structure and themes ==
A page from an edition of the Romance of the Sui and Tang, collected in Korea

Although the novel follows the broad sequence of Chinese history, it is not arranged solely as a chronological record. Episodes are grouped around particular rulers, families, heroes and romantic relationships, and the narrative sometimes returns to an earlier period after following another group of characters.

The first part combines the rise and fall of the Sui court with Qin Qiong's personal development and the gathering of the Sui–Tang heroes. The middle chapters describe the establishment of the Tang, Li Shimin's campaigns and struggles within the imperial family. Later sections move through the reigns of Emperor Taizong, Wu Zetian and Empress Wei before concentrating on Emperor Xuanzong and the An Lushan Rebellion.

A central theme is the relationship between political conduct and dynastic legitimacy. The fall of the Sui and the rise of the Tang are presented partly through the traditional concept of the Mandate of Heaven. At the same time, the narrative repeatedly attributes political disorder to the decisions of rulers, including excessive construction, military expansion, factional conflict and the neglect of government for private relationships.

The novel's supernatural framework interprets history through fate, karmic causation and reincarnation. Chang Ching-fa argues that the fictional relationship between the Sui and Tang rulers operates as a structural device that joins the otherwise diverse parts of the novel and provides a cyclical explanation of dynastic prosperity and decline.

Courtly romance and political history are closely connected. Emperor Yang and Emperor Xuanzong are both represented as rulers whose emotional and sexual relationships affect government, but neither is treated only as a conventional villain. The narrative alternates between criticism of their political failures and sympathy for their personal attachments and losses.

The heroic episodes examine loyalty under conditions of dynastic collapse. Qin Qiong and other warriors must choose among the Sui government, rebel regimes, personal patrons and the future Tang dynasty. Friendship, sworn obligations and gratitude frequently conflict with political allegiance. Hegel interprets Qin's development as an exploration of filial devotion, friendship, loyalty and the process by which a warrior decides which ruler has a legitimate claim to his service.

Most chapters are followed by commentary that draws a moral or historical lesson from the preceding events. These passages distinguish the work from a simple sequence of adventure stories and place individual conduct within a broader interpretation of political order and dynastic change.

== Characters ==
Covers of a Thai translation of the novel Romance of the Sui and Tang from Thailand
- Qin Qiong is the most important connecting character in the first two-thirds of the novel. Rather than beginning as an invincible warrior, he is portrayed as inexperienced, financially insecure and uncertain about how to reconcile official duty with friendship. His personal development links the world of local administration, the community of martial heroes and the emergence of the Tang state.
- Emperor Yang is a principal figure in the Sui portion. His palace life and political projects are presented alongside the growing instability of the dynasty. Zhu Gui'er is one of the fictional women associated with his court and plays an important role in the supernatural structure linking the Sui and Tang portions.
- Li Shimin functions as both a military unifier and a politically ambiguous ruler. The novel presents his victories over rival states but also recounts his conflict with his brothers and his seizure of power at the Xuanwu Gate. Li Yuan, Li Jiancheng (李建成), Li Yuanji (李元吉), Wei Zheng (魏徵) and other figures from the early Tang court appear in both historical and fictionalized episodes.

The martial characters include Cheng Yaojin, Shan Xiongxin, Wang Bodang, Xu Maogong, Yuchi Gong (尉遲恭), Luo Shixin (羅士信) and Li Jing (李靖). The novel does not organize these figures according to the fixed hierarchy of the “Eighteen Heroes” that became prominent in later versions of the Sui–Tang story cycle. Its warriors are instead distributed across several overlapping narratives concerning rebellion, friendship and dynastic allegiance.

The later Tang chapters are dominated by Emperor Xuanzong, Yang Guifei, An Lushan, Yang Guozhong, Emperor Suzong and the officials and military commanders involved in the rebellion. Xuanzong's relationship with Yang Guifei parallels, but does not simply repeat, the earlier imperial romance involving Emperor Yang and Zhu Gui'er.

== Reception and influence ==
Illustrations of characters in the novel, from the University of Tokyo in Japan

Sui Tang Yanyi remained in widespread circulation throughout the Qing dynasty and became one of the most popular vernacular written sources for later literary treatments of the Sui and Tang periods. Its importance lies partly in its consolidation of earlier narratives concerning Emperor Yang, Qin Qiong and the founding of the Tang into a single extended work.

Later authors repeatedly rewrote or adapted parts of the novel. Shuo Tang Quanzhuan transformed its early-Tang material into a more concentrated heroic and military romance, while other novels reused episodes concerning later Tang rulers, court conflicts and military campaigns.

The book also contributed to the development of later versions of the Mulan legend. Its account places Mulan within the wars between Dou Jiande's regime and the emerging Tang state and gives her a tragic conclusion not found in the earliest surviving poem about the character.

Robert E. Hegel translated an excerpt from chapter 18 into English under the title “Romance of the Sui and Tang”. It appeared in issue 70 of the literary translation journal Renditions in 2008. A public-domain electronic transcription of the complete Chinese text has been distributed by Project Gutenberg.

== Relationship to Shuo Tang ==
Sui Tang Yanyi is distinct from the anonymous or pseudonymous eighteenth-century novel Shuo Tang Quanzhuan (說唐全傳), generally shortened to Shuo Tang (說唐). The titles are sometimes confused because both works feature Qin Qiong, Cheng Yaojin, Shan Xiongxin and other heroes associated with the transition from Sui to Tang.

Sui Tang Yanyi contains 100 chapters and extends from the rise of the Sui to the reign of Emperor Xuanzong. Shuo Tang, by contrast, concentrates mainly on the collapse of the Sui, the wars among competing rulers and the establishment of the Tang under Li Yuan and Li Shimin. It gives greater prominence to spectacular martial contests, superhuman warriors and formal rankings of heroes.

Hegel describes Shuo Tang Quanzhuan as a substantial rewriting of the earlier Sui–Tang narrative tradition, particularly Sui Tang Yanyi. Rather than merely abridging Chu's novel, it changes its tone, characterization and narrative priorities by incorporating more material associated with storytelling and theatrical performance.

The group conventionally called the “Eighteen Heroes of the Sui–Tang Transition” (隋唐十八好漢) is therefore more directly associated with Shuo Tang and later storytelling traditions than with the narrative organization of Chu Renhuo's novel.
