= Northwest Passage (TV series) =

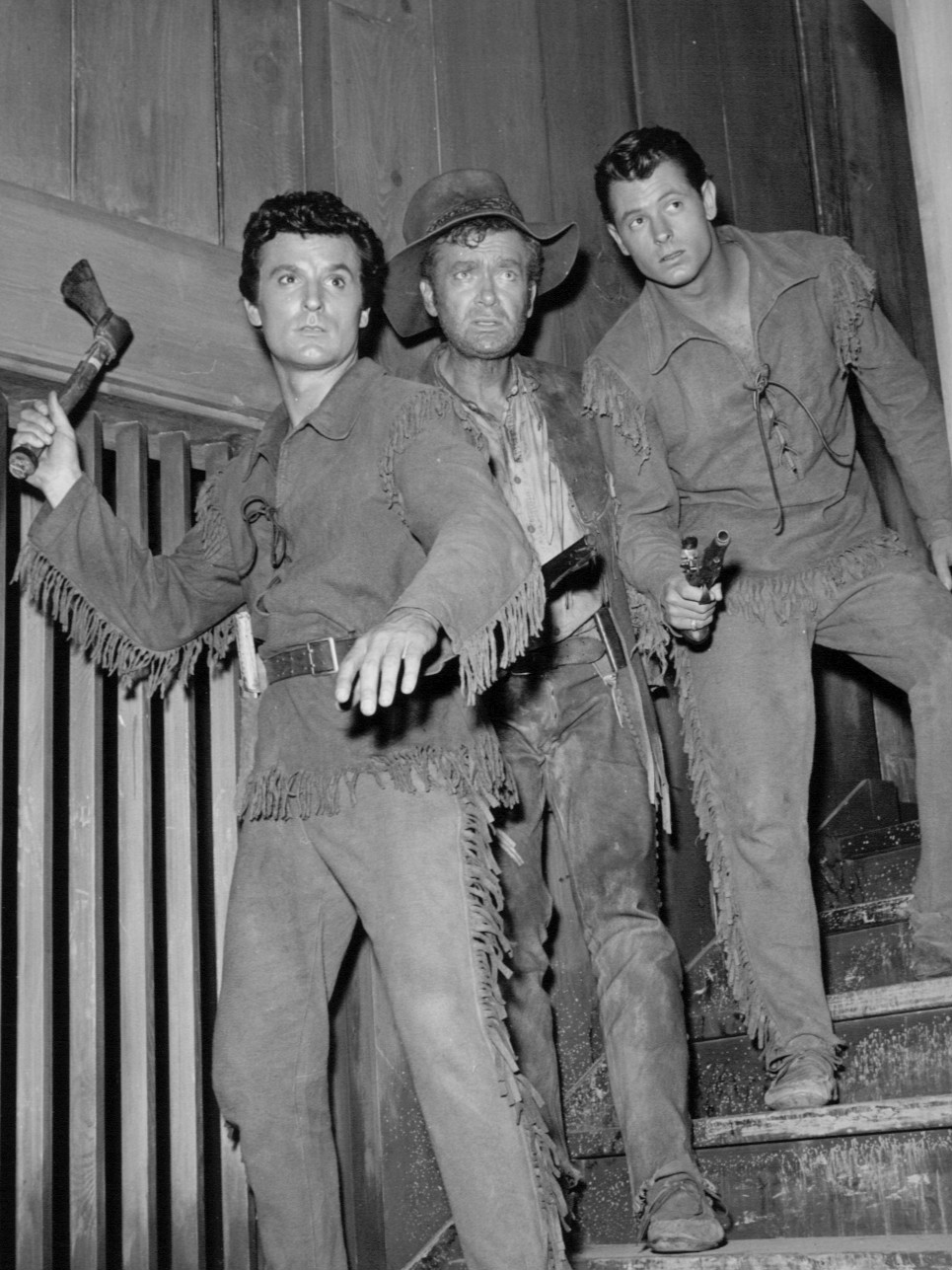
- From left: Keith Larsen, Buddy Ebsen and Don Burnett, 1958
- Starring: Keith Larsen; Buddy Ebsen; Don Burnett
- Country of origin: United States
- No. of seasons: 1
- No. of episodes: 26

Production
- Running time: 30 min.
- Production company: MGM Television

Original release
- Network: NBC
- Release: September 14, 1958 – March 13, 1959

Northwest Passage is a 26-episode half-hour adventure television series produced by Metro Goldwyn Mayer about Major Robert Rogers during the time of the French and Indian War (1756–63). Jacques Tourneur, George Waggner, Alan Grossland. JR were the main directors. It was broadcast from September 14, 1958, to September 8, 1959, on NBC.

The show derived its title and the main characters Rogers, Towne, and Marriner from the 1937 novel of the same name by Kenneth Roberts and from the 1940 MGM feature film based on the novel.

The scope of the novel was much broader than that of the series, and the second half of the book included an historically based attempt by Rogers to find a water route through North America as a "passage" to the Pacific Ocean. This attempt, lending its name to the novel and used by Roberts as a metaphor for the questing human spirit, is referenced in the first episode.

== Cast ==
- Major Robert Rogers - Keith Larsen
- Sergeant Hunk Marriner - Buddy Ebsen
- Ensign Langdon Towne - Don Burnett
- General Amherst - Philip Tonge

== Schedule ==
The show was broadcast at 7:30 p.m. Eastern Time throughout its run on network TV. It initially was on Sundays, and in January 1959 it was moved to Fridays. Beginning in July 1959 it was broadcast on Tuesdays.
