= Northwest Passage (novel) =

1937 novel by Kenneth Roberts

- First edition cover
- Author: Kenneth Roberts
- Language: English
- Genre: Historical fiction
- Publisher: Doubleday
- Publication date: 1937
- Publication place: United States
- Media type: Print (hardcover and paperback)
- Pages: 734pp
- OCLC: 48577415
- Dewey Decimal: 813/.52 21
- LC Class: PS3535.O176 N6 2001

Northwest Passage is an historical novel by Kenneth Roberts, published in 1937. Told through the eyes of primary character Langdon Towne, much of the novel follows the exploits and character of Robert Rogers, the leader of Rogers' Rangers, who were a colonial force fighting with the British during the French and Indian War.

Structurally, Northwest Passage is divided into halves. The first half is a carefully researched, day-by-day recreation of the raid by Rogers' Rangers on the Indian village at Saint-François-du-Lac, Quebec (or Saint Francis, to the Americans troops), a settlement of the Abenakis, an American Indian tribe. The second half of the novel covers Rogers' later life in London, England, and Fort Michilimackinac, Michigan. Roberts' decision to cover the novel's material in two distinct halves followed the actual trajectory of Rogers' life.

The book later served as the basis for a 1940 film starring Spencer Tracy and a 1958-59 TV show on NBC starring Keith Larsen and Buddy Ebsen.

== Plot ==
=== Book 1 ===
Langdon Towne is a young Congregationalist resident of Kittery, Maine, in love with Elizabeth Browne, the youngest daughter of Anglican minister Rev. Arthur Browne of nearby Portsmouth, New Hampshire. Towne wants to become an artist, a goal which he has kept secret from even Elizabeth. He is admitted to Harvard College, but an ill-timed visit from his friends Saved from Captivity ('Cap') Huff and Hunking ('Hunk') Marriner results in his expulsion in 1759, although it does allow him to meet the young artist John Singleton Copley. Upon his return to Portsmouth, he incautiously insults Benning Wentworth, the governor of the Province of New Hampshire, and he and Hunk flee arrest and head to Crown Point to join the volunteers fighting the French and Indian War.

On their way, they meet a sergeant named McNott, who is a member of Rogers' Rangers. Both Towne and Hunk decide to join Rogers' Rangers themselves. After arriving at Crown Point, Towne impresses Major Robert Rogers with a discussion about the Northwest Passage and is chosen as one of Rogers' aides. Setting out with a force of Rangers, Stockbridge Indians and Mohawk Indians, the troops are not told their destination. The Mohawks, who are closely allied with Sir William Johnson, are jealous of Rogers' preference for the Stockbridge Indians and decide to leave. Hunk and McNott, among others, are critically injured when the Mohawks detonate gunpowder after failing to steal it and have to be left behind. The rest of the Rangers are then informed that their destination is the Abenaki town of Saint Francis, a center for hostile native raiding parties into New England. In a predawn attack, the Rangers annihilate the town and kill about a quarter of the population. However, to prevent capture, the Rangers choose to return across Quebec and northern Vermont, through the forests along the eastern shore of Lake Memphremagog. The harrowing journey creates dissension, and some Rangers who choose to separate from the main body are massacred by pursuing French and Indian troops.

The starving troops eventually make it safely to the planned meeting point, Fort Wentworth on the Connecticut River, where reinforcements and supplies were supposed to be waiting for them. However, the reinforcements withdrew with the food shortly before their arrival, apparently afraid that Rogers' men were enemy troops. A group of four men, including Rogers and Towne, make the arduous raft trip down the Connecticut to the Fort at Number 4 to get food for the rest of the company. They barely make it, but they succeed in saving the company. As a result, Towne is promoted to ensign, and he returns to Portsmouth a hero, just in time to witness Hunk's death from his wounds. Towne now openly works at painting, and Copley helps get him a small commission and points him toward a trip to England to study art. Towne, however, wants to stay in Portsmouth, paint natives and the West, and marry Elizabeth. When Rogers comes to town in the summer of 1761, he greets Towne as a long-lost friend . . . and asks Towne to be his best man, as he has proposed to Elizabeth, whom he met through fellow Mason Rev. Browne, and she has accepted. Instead, a crushed Towne tells Rogers that he is going to England, as Copley had urged.

=== Book 2 ===
In London, Towne learns that no one can achieve success except through "preferment", usually through a sponsor. His search for sponsorship leads him to Benjamin Franklin, who arranges for him to get a commission to limn a panel painting of Jeffery Amherst at Vauxhall Gardens. This commission, in turn, brings him other work, more than enough to prevent him from having to return home broke. In early 1765, Towne, now 26, finds out that Rogers (minus Elizabeth) has arrived in London. With Rogers' help, Towne gets a major commission from a wealthy nobleman to paint a series of pictures of the Saint Francis raid. Rogers has decided to mount an expedition to find the Northwest Passage and has come to England both to collect his back pay and to win appointment as the royal governor of Fort Michilimackinac, the farthest west of the British forts on the Great Lakes, and he offers to include Towne in the expedition.

Rogers has a personal secretary named Natty Potter, who helps him write two books and a play while in London. Potter recruits Towne to find his daughter Ann. Towne finds that Ann, now about 14, was left nine years ago with a family that trained children to act as crippled beggars, and he pays £15 to take her away from there. To his surprise, Towne learns that Potter only wanted to blackmail Ann's mother, a member of a wealthy family with whom he had had a Fleet Marriage and is unwilling to provide for Ann or to reimburse Towne after the blackmail is paid, and Ann becomes Towne's responsibility. Ann proves to be a gifted mimic and quickly picks up "proper" behavior from the tutor Towne hires for her.

With the help of Charles Townshend, Rogers is appointed governor of Michilimackinac over the objections of General Thomas Gage and Sir William Johnson, who had monopolized trade with the natives. When Towne finishes his series of paintings, he and Ann return with Rogers and Potter to Portsmouth in 1766. Rogers has arranged for several of his former Rangers to join the journey, including McNott (who lost a leg from the gunpowder explosion), Jonathan Carver, and James Tute; Elizabeth, Potter and Ann also accompany the group to Michilimackinac. Rogers expects to receive orders that permit him to appoint a deputy governor so that he can lead the search for the Northwest Passage himself, but such orders are not included with the authorization for the expedition, so the group leaves without Rogers (or Elizabeth, Potter and Ann), with Tute and a trader named Stanley Goddard in command.

Because Towne has paid his own way to join the expedition, he is not under Tute's command, and he and McNott winter separately among the Yankton Dakota. In the spring, when they reunite with Tute, Goddard and Carver, they find that the rest of the group is out of supplies. Towne and McNott then learn that the other three have used their supplies to purchase a large parcel of land from the Dakota (which the Yankton Dakota inform McNott that the Dakota do not actually own, because it is contested by the Ojibwe) and have abandoned their mission. McNott and Towne travel up the Missouri River on the route to the Northwest Passage without them, but a serious injury to McNott forces them to turn back to Michilimackinac. When they arrive in the spring of 1768, they learn that Charles Townshend has died, that Rogers has been arrested by Gage and Johnson for exceeding his authority, and that Ann has returned to England after Rogers tried to take improper liberties with her.

When the ice on the Great Lakes breaks, Towne realizes that he has fallen in love with Ann and returns to England himself, where he finds and marries Ann, who has just opened a one-woman play about life on the frontier. She has taken some of his sketches to a royal society that commissions him to paint a series of pictures based on native mythology. Rogers later returns to England after being acquitted at court-martial but is ill from his imprisonment and is soon sentenced to debtors' prison. At the end of the novel, Towne and Ann decide to return to North America and side with the rebels during the American Revolution, although they know Rogers has sided with the British.

== Impact ==
Northwest Passage was first published in serial form in the Saturday Evening Post in one of the last decisions made by George Horace Lorimer before his retirement as editor of the Post, with Book 1 running in 1936 and Book 2 in 1937. The story became a national sensation and was the second best-selling novel in the U.S. in 1937, behind only Gone with the Wind and was also the fifth best-selling novel in 1938. A heavily-condensed edition was published as an Armed Services Edition during WWII.

Roberts wrote the novel in close collaboration with his neighbor Booth Tarkington and dedicated the novel to him. In his autobiography, Roberts says that Tarkington did significantly more editing and rewriting of this book than he had ever done on any of Roberts' prior books, even Rabble in Arms, which had been Roberts' first real success. As a result, Roberts became discouraged during the writing process. When he worked up the courage to ask Tarkington whether his writing had become so much worse that the book needed so much more substantial editing, Tarkington told him that the opposite was true—the book was so much better than its predecessors that Tarkington thought it could become a major success with such editing. Roberts offered Tarkington co-author credit, but Tarkington refused it.

Roberts was hampered in writing Book 2 by the absence of two court-martial transcripts: the trial of Lieutenant Stephens (who was the leader of the troops that took the food away from Fort Wentworth in Book 1) and the trial of Rogers himself, which was a key element in Book 2. The transcripts had been lost for over one hundred years, and several historians had claimed that the transcripts had been suppressed by Rogers' allies such as Amherst to cover up embarrassing details about Rogers. Roberts, however, believed that the transcripts had probably been destroyed by Rogers' enemies, Gage and Johnson, and that copies still might exist at the Colonial Office in England. To that end, he hired a full-time English researcher to hunt for the transcripts.

After an extended search, when the novel was almost complete, copies of both transcripts were located, and Roberts' theory that they would be helpful, not harmful, to Rogers' reputation proved to be correct. The transcripts were published as part of a special two-volume first edition of Northwest Passage. However, Roberts fell behind in writing the book as a result of the inability to find the transcripts, and he had to finish the last part of the story (beginning with the journey from Michilimackinac) while on holiday in Italy, without the help of Tarkington. Another friend of Roberts, novelist A. Hamilton Gibbs (author of the number one bestseller of 1925, Soundings), performed an editing function similar to Tarkington for the last section. Some critics of the time found the transition in prose style to be jarring.

== Filmed versions ==
Because of the success of the novel, a bidding war arose over the movie rights. MGM purchased the rights for an undisclosed "record sum."

The St. Francis raid, depicted in the first half of the novel, inspired the 1940 movie with the same title, starring Spencer Tracy. The producers' decision to concentrate on the first book of the novel allowed the film to have a happy ending. Roberts, however, intensely disliked the movie, which had the Rogers character burst into tears upon a disappointment (while the historic Rogers had rallied his force to remain strong despite the disappointment), completely omitted the harrowing but pivotal journey to the Fort at Number 4, and ignored the Towne-Rogers-Elizabeth romantic triangle (going so far as to have Elizabeth end up with Towne). Roberts resolved to refuse to sell any more of his works to Hollywood as a result.

According to MGM, the cost of making the movie in Technicolor had proven to be prohibitive, and so MGM decided not to film the second book of the novel. Roberts, though, believed that the producers had never had any intention of filming the second book because they never introduced the character of McNott, who played a key role in both books, in the movie of the first book.

The book also served as the basis for a 1958-59 television series, which was more closely based on the movie than on the book.
