= The Battle of Cowpens (small volume) =

1958 book by Kenneth Roberts

The Battle of Cowpens, published in 1958, is the last published work of the late novelist Kenneth Roberts. It is an essay discussing the Battle of Cowpens during the American Revolution, which Roberts had originally intended to turn into a novel but published as an essay to popularize his view of the battle.

The American commander at Cowpens was Brigadier General Daniel Morgan, one of the heroes of Roberts' earlier novels Arundel and Rabble in Arms as a key aide to Major General Benedict Arnold. Roberts wanted to challenge the historians that had written about the blunders of both Morgan and British Colonel Banastre Tarleton during the battle, but his physical condition wouldn't permit him to finish another novel. Instead, Roberts accepted a commission from Collier's to write an essay about the battle. Roberts, however, was displeased with the abridged version of the essay that was published and arranged to have the unedited version published, albeit posthumously.

The battle was the turning point in the American Revolution, when Morgan's rough & ready raiders took on Tarleton's veteran troops in a South Carolina meadow and in less than an hour showed the way that Yorktown would go. This is a diorama of the battle done with the unfailing skill of Roberts at his best through the last. It is a gem of historical re-enactment.

— Charles A. Wagner, New York Mirror
