= Henry Gross (dowser) =

American game warden and dowser (1895–1979)

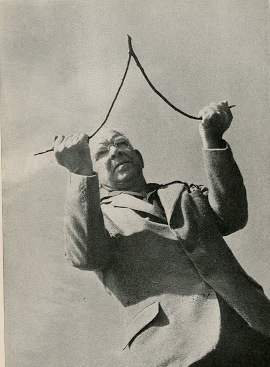
Henry Gross

Henry Gross (1895 – 1979) was an American game warden and dowser.

Gross worked as a game warden in Biddeford, Maine. He was most well known for his search of objects and underground water by dowsing with a Y-shaped stick. It was alleged by Kenneth Roberts who wrote the book Henry Gross and His Dowsing Rod (1951) that Gross located water all over Maine and in surrounding states.

Science writer Martin Gardner disputed any occult interpretation of Gross's abilities commenting that his dowsing was the result of the exaggeration, ideomotor effect and random chance. Gardner noted that "Even in Kenneth Roberts' violently partisan book, he records an abundance of failures by Henry Gross whenever conditions approaching a scientific test were arranged. For example, Henry was unable to distinguish mason jars containing water from jars containing sand when the jars were concealed inside paper sacks. He was unable to find envelopes containing coins when they were placed on the ground beside empty envelopes." Evon Z. Vogt and Ray Hyman also examined the reports of his dowsing in depth and concluded the cause was ideomotor action and suggestion.

Robert P. Sharp, a geology expert, noted that the dowsing experiments in which Gross was involved were poorly designed and his claims were at odds with groundwater behaviour and research from geophysics. In 1961 Mr. Gross appeared as a mystery challenger on the television game show "To Tell the Truth".
