= Oliver Wiswell (novel) =

1940 novel by Kenneth Roberts

- Author: Kenneth Roberts
- Language: English
- Genre: Historical fiction
- Publisher: Doubleday
- Publication date: 1940
- Publication place: United States
- Media type: Print (hardcover and paperback)
- Pages: 836pp
- OCLC: 671486
- LC Class: PS3535.O176 O5 1940

Oliver Wiswell is an historical novel by Kenneth Roberts, published in 1940. Told through the eyes of the primary character Oliver Wiswell, a Loyalist from Milton, Massachusetts, during the American Revolution, and follows his experiences from the Crown's evacuation of Boston, to Nova Scotia, to New York, to London, to Paris, to Virginia and the Ohio Country, to South Carolina, and, in the end, back to Nova Scotia.

This novel was in keeping with Roberts' writing of historical fiction, looking at U.S. history from perspectives that counter the mainstream view of the nation's past. In this novel, he writes from the point of view of a Massachusetts Tory, or Loyalist, who supported the British monarchy. Like his other novels, it was known for deeply researched battle scenes and historical detail.

== Plot ==
Spanning the years from 1775 to 1783, the novel traces the adventures of a Yale student who is deeply loyal to the Crown. Oliver Wiswell is home from Connecticut when the Battle of Bunker Hill happens. After a conflict with his neighbors, he escapes with other local loyalists to the British army in Boston. He meets Sir William Howe and sails with him and the King's forces when they evacuate Boston the following March.

Wiswell gets involved in the planning for the invasion of New York, where he serves as one of Howe's spies making contact with Loyalists in the Hempstead area of Long Island, in which capacity he witnesses the Battle of Long Island. He then goes to London to try to tell the ministry his perception of the truth about America. The Crown then sends him to Paris as a secret agent to counter the revolutionaries' activities. After Paris, he returns to the colonies to Virginia and the Wilderness Trail as far as Cumberland Gap. He later joins Benedict Arnold's operations in the southern colonies, culminating in the defense of Ninety-Six. Eventually, at war's end, he ends up in exile in Halifax, Nova Scotia.

== A Counter Narrative ==
The novel is a counter-narrative to the standard American Revolution story. Wiswell is a young, idealistic student and aspiring historian who, along with his well-respected lawyer father, dislikes the repressive and punitive measures the Crown has taken on Massachusetts, but trusts the British government to see the error of its ways. They view local citizens like Samuel Adams and John Hancock as rabble-rousers and hypocrites. As such, the novel portrays the Patriots (rebels) as a brutal mob committing injustices against loyal members of the community, including several close friends. The book countered the traditional American origin story by depicting Loyalists not as men of conviction who believed in law and order and detested the tyranny of mob rule.

After the outbreak of hostilities, the increasing personal danger to his life forces him to flee to Boston. The novel explores the strained personal relationships caused by the war, including that with his true love, Sally Leighton, a local girl from a seafaring family that chose the opposing side. He is also frequently encountering family and friends who have chosen to join the revolutionaries. Roberts has Wiswell, as a student of history, see the war as a civil war and even has him planning to write a book in England to get the British government to see it in that light. Roberts does not glorify the British; Oliver frequently criticizes British generals for their "bungling" and mismanagement, and decries the disdain and contempt various individuals in the government and the army express toward many loyalists.

In the novel, Roberts emphasizes that the Revolution was essentially a bitter civil war that split families and communities apart, resulting in massacres, exile, and immense personal loss. This resulted in criticism upon its publishing, but his critics did give him credit for his meticulous research and the detailed descriptions of revolutionary America's life, politics, and military campaigns.
