= The Iron Candlestick =

1952 novel by Dimitar Talev

- Author: Dimitar Talev
- Original title: Железният светилник
- Language: Bulgarian
- Genre: historical novel
- Publication date: 1952
- Publication place: Bulgaria
- Followed by: The Bells of Prespa

The Iron Candlestick (Bulgarian: Железният светилник, Zhelezniat svetilnik; also translated The Iron Oil Lamp) is a Bulgarian historical novel by Dimitar Talev. It is the first book of the famous tetralogy, originally published in 1952.

The novel reflects the struggle for political and religious independence of the Bulgarians in the early 19th century.

It was loosely adapted into the 1969 film Ikonostasat, starring Stoyan Gadev.

== Plot ==
The novel takes place in the fictional town of Prespa (named after the homonymous area and representing Talev's hometown Prilep) and follows the story of a typical Renaissance family. Focused mainly on the figure of Stoyan Glaushev (whose prototype is the prominent Bulgarian cleric Methodius Kusev) and his part in the fight against Phanariotes, as well as the joint efforts of the Prespa residents for the reestablishment of the independent Bulgarian church.
