= Time of Parting =

1964 novel by Anton Donchev

- Cover
- Author: Anton Donchev
- Language: Bulgarian
- Set in: Krastowa Gora, 1664
- Published: 1964
- Publication place: Bulgaria

Time of Parting (Bulgarian: Време разделно, Vreme razdelno) is a novel written by Anton Donchev and published in 1964.

It was adapted for the screen in 1988.

== Reviews ==
Time of Parting was judged the 2nd greatest work ever in the Bulgarian Big Read in 2008–09.

== Adaptations ==
Time of Violence, is a film, based on this book by Bulgarian film director, Ludmil Staikov , that was screened in Cannes Film Festival at the 1988.
