= Time of Violence =

- Theatrical release poster
- Directed by: Ludmil Staikov
- Written by: Ludmil Staikov, Georgi Danailov, Mihail Kirkov, Radoslav Spasov
- Based on: Time of Parting by Anton Donchev
- Produced by: Hristo Nenov
- Starring: Yosif Sarchadzhiev; Rousy Chanev; Ivan Krastev; Anya Pencheva
- Cinematography: Radoslav Spasov
- Edited by: Violeta Toshkova
- Music by: Georgi Genkov
- Distributed by: Boyana Film
- Release date: 28 March 1988
- Running time: 288 minutes
- Country: Bulgaria
- Language: Bulgarian

Time of Violence (Bulgarian: Време разделно) is a 1988 Bulgarian historical film based on the novel Time of Parting by Anton Donchev. The film was split into two parts with a combined total runtime of 288 minutes.

== Development ==
The film was originally known by the same name as the book on-which it was based – Time of Parting. The film was submitted internationally under the name Time of Violence and the first part was called The Threat and the second Violence.

The government of the People's Republic of Bulgaria financed the production of the film.

== Plot ==
The film is set in the Ottoman Empire, in 1668. As Köprülü Fazıl Ahmed Pasha concentrates his war efforts on the Cretan War, he grows paranoid of the Sultan's Christian subjects, convinced that they are an uncontrollable threat to the empire unless converted to Islam.

One of the targets is Elindenya, a village located in a Rhodope valley where the Christian Bulgarians' way of life was for the most part left alone under the Ottoman governor Süleyman Agha's rule. A sipahi regiment is dispatched to the valley with the mission of converting the Christian population to Islam. The regiment is led by Kara Ibrahim, a fanatical devshirme from Elindenya. Although Süleyman Agha, feeling that his self-ordained rule is at stake, objects to forced conversions, Kara Ibrahim favors measures of extreme brutality against the local Bulgarians, including his own family.

In the course of the film, Kara Ibrahim tortures a number of villagers and kills his own brother who had planned to assassinate him. In the end, Kara Ibrahim is killed by Mircho, and Kara Ibrahim's Venetian slave escapes with Mircho's lover, Elitsa, in tow.

== Release ==
The film was screened at the 1988 Cannes Film Festival under the name Time of Violence to distinguish the film from the original novel. Groups of schoolchildren were even taken to see the film there.

== Reception ==
Time of Violence sold over five million tickets in Bulgaria, a country of fewer than nine million inhabitants at the time, within months of its release. The first part of Time of Violence was the most popular film of 1988 in Bulgaria. The film was later Bulgaria's submission to the 62nd Academy Awards, though it was ultimately not nominated for Best International Feature Film.

The film continues to enjoy popularity in Bulgaria. It was named the best Bulgarian film in national surveys in 2010 and 2015, and continues to be regularly broadcast on Bulgarian television.

== International relations ==
Time of Violence was part of an international dispute between the People's Republic of Bulgaria and Turkey. The film was produced during the assimilation campaign known as the Revival Process. In 1987, Turkish state television aired a dramatization titled Born Again (Turkish: Yeniden Doğmak) about families separated by events in Bulgaria, prompting a sharp response from the Bulgarian government. Subsequent diplomatic negotiations between Bulgaria and Turkey concerned the broadcast of Time of Violence and the Turkish film Belene, which documented the Belene labor camp in Bulgaria.

== Cast ==
- Yosif Sarchadzhiev as Kara Ibrahim
- Rousy Chanev as Pop Aligorko
- Ivan Krastev as Manol
- Anya Pencheva as Sevda
- Valter Toski as the Venetian
- Vasil Mihaylov as Süleyman Aga
- Kalina Stefanova as Elitsa
- Momchil Karamitev as Momchil
- Konstantin Kotsev as Dyado Galushko
- Stoyko Peev as Goran
- Bogomil Simeonov as Ismail Bey
- Djoko Rosic as Kara Hasan
- Velko Kanev as Köprülü Fazıl Ahmed Pasha
- Stefka Berova as Gyulfie
- Angel Ivanov as Mircho
- Nikola Todev as Stoyko Protsvet

== See also ==
- List of submissions to the 62nd Academy Awards for Best Foreign Language Film
- List of Bulgarian submissions for the Academy Award for Best Foreign Language Film

== Bibliography ==
- Donev, Alexander (2024). "Reasoning and Profile of Bulgarian Socialist Blockbuster Cinema" (PDF). Journal for Theatre and Culture (2). Homo Ludens: 107–115.
- Garbolevsky, Evgenija (2011). The Conformists: Creativity and Decadence in the Bulgarian Cinema 1945-89. Newcastle upon Tyne: Cambridge Scholars Publishing. ISBN 978-1-4438-2970-0.
- Garcia-Olano, Diego. "Oscars: Foreign Language Film Project". DiegoOlano.com.
- Kamusella, Tomasz (2019). Ethnic Cleansing During the Cold War: The Forgotten 1989 Expulsion of Turks from Communist Bulgaria. London: Routledge. ISBN 978-1138480520.
- Ragaru, Nadège (2023). "Symbolic Time(s) of Violence in Late Socialist Bulgaria" (PDF). Slavic Review. 82 (1): 48–68.
- Sevim, Seçkin; Aydın Sevim, Bilgen (15 October 2022). ""Sizler de Unutmayın Beni Türkiye'deki Kardeşlerim": Yeniden Doğmak Dizisi ve Duygu Politikası" ["Do Not Forget Me, My Brothers and Sisters in Turkey": The Series Yeniden Doğmak and the Politics of Emotion]. Akademik İncelemeler Dergisi [Journal of Academic Inquiries] (in Turkish). 17 (2): 327–345. doi:10.17550/akademikincelemeler.1152589.
- Thornton, Sybil A. (2016). "The Return Song and the Myth of the Founding of the Nation in Vreme na nasilie". Athens Journal of History. 2 (3): 149–168. doi:10.30958/ajhis.2-3-1.
