= Lydia Bailey (novel) =

1947 novel by Kenneth Roberts

- First edition (US)
- Author: Kenneth Roberts
- Language: English
- Genre: Historical
- Publisher: Doubleday (US); Collins (UK)
- Publication date: 1947
- Media type: Print

Lydia Bailey (1947) is an historical novel by American writer Kenneth Roberts. It spent twelve weeks at the top of the list of The New York Times Fiction Best Sellers of 1947.

The book is set in the early 19th century during the Haitian Revolution (1791-1804), with the action taking place in Haiti, France, and amongst the Barbary pirates from North Africa. Albion Hamlin, a young American, develops an obsession for Lydia Bailey, a woman he has never set eyes on.

== Film adaptation ==
In 1952 the novel was adapted as a film by the Hollywood studio 20th Century Fox. It was directed by Jean Negulesco, from a screenplay by Michael Blankfort and Philip Dunne. The filmmakers expanded the title role beyond the character's lesser position in the novel, and reduced the narrative. The film, produced in Technicolor, is set entirely on Haiti.

A number of actresses were suggested for the role of Bailey, including Micheline Presle, Jean Simmons, Linda Darnell, and Susan Hayward, before Anne Francis was cast in the part.
