= Anton Donchev =

Bulgarian author (1930–2022)

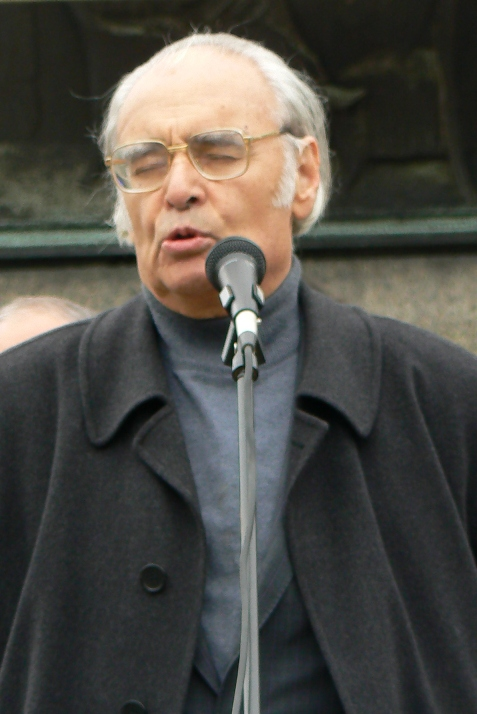
- Donchev in 2010
- Born: 14 September 1930; Burgas, Bulgaria
- Died: 20 October 2022 (aged 92); Sofia, Bulgaria
- Occupations: Novelist, playwright, physician
- Spouse(s): Evelina Troyanska, Rayna Vasileva
- Writing career
- Language: Bulgarian
- Notable work: Time of Parting
- Website: antondonchev.com

Anton Nikolov Donchev (Bulgarian: Антон Николов Дончев, 14 September 1930 – 20 October 2022) was a Bulgarian writer of historical novels and screenwriter of Bulgarian historical drama films. In 2003 he was elected an academic at the Bulgarian Academy of Sciences. He is well known in the country and abroad with his novel Time of Parting.

== Biography ==
Donchev graduated from Veliko Tarnovo High School in 1948 and graduated "Law" at the Sofia University in 1953. He was denied the prestigious post of Veliko Tarnovo Judge, and started writing as a profession.

== Political activity ==
Donchev was a co-founder of the "Consolidation" Committee consisting of up to 10 November 1989, and now to Bulgarian Socialist Party and former Bulgarian President Georgi Parvanov, writers, publishers and sports actors.

== Personal life and death ==
Donchev's first wife is the Bulgarian chessmaster Evelina Troyanska. On his 79th birthday, Donchev married the 64-year-old Rayna Vasileva, a former journalist from the Bulgarian National Radio.

Donchev died on 20 October 2022, at the age of 92.

== Writing career ==
His first independent novel, Samuel's Testimony, was published in 1961. His second book, Time of Parting, which dealt with Islamization in the Bulgarian region of Rhodopes in the 17th century. Written over a period of 41 days in 1964, the novel made the writer famous. The novel was translated and published abroad. He received a nomination from the Jane and Irving Stone Foundation for Best Historical Novel. The novel was adapted (the movie Time of Violence is divided into two parts with the subtitles "The Threat" and "The Violence") in 1987 by the director Lyudmil Staykov. In June 2015, Time of Violence was chosen as the most beloved film of Bulgarian viewers in "Laced Shoes of Bulgarian Cinema", a large-scale consultation with the audience of Bulgarian National Television.

== Bibliography ==
- Samuel's Testimony, 1961
- Time of Parting, 1964 (33 translations in foreign languages as of 2008, screened in 1987)
- Nine Persons of Man, 1989
- A Testimony for Khan Asparuh, Knyaz Slav and Teres 1968 - 1992
- The Strange Knight of the Sacred Book, 1998
- The Three Lifes of Krakra, 2007
- The Legends of the Two Treasures, 2015
- The Shadow of Alexander the Great, 2016

== Films ==
- "Time of Violence" (1988)
- "The Millions of Privalov" (1983)
- "Return from Rome" (1977)
- "On the Other Side of the Mirror" (1977)
- "Burn to Light" (1976)
- "The Packet" (1972)
- "Kaloyan" (1963)
