= Li Mi =

Li Mi may refer to the following Chinese people:

- Li Mi (Jin dynasty) (李密; 224–287), official of Shu Han and the Jin dynasty
- Li Mi (Sui dynasty) (李密; 582–619), rebel leader against the Sui dynasty
- Li Mi (Tang general) (李宓; ?–753), general of the Tang dynasty
- Li Mi (chancellor) (李泌; 722–789), official of the Tang dynasty
- Li Mi (Republic of China general) (李彌; 1902–1973)
