= Kenneth Roberts (author) =

American writer (1885–1957)

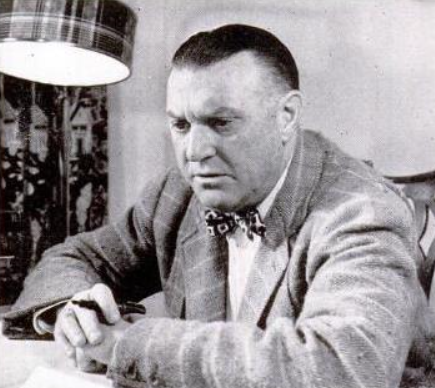
- Born: Kenneth Lewis Roberts; December 8, 1885; Kennebunk, Maine, US
- Died: July 21, 1957 (aged 71); Kennebunkport, Maine, US
- Education: Cornell University
- Occupation: Writer
- Spouse: Anna
- Writing career
- Period: 1929–1957
- Genre: Historical fiction
- Notable work: Northwest Passage
- Notable awards: Pulitzer Prize Special Citation

Kenneth Lewis Roberts (December 8, 1885 – July 21, 1957) was an American writer of historical novels. He worked first as a journalist, becoming nationally known for his work with the Saturday Evening Post from 1919 to 1928, and then as a popular novelist. Born in Kennebunk, Maine, Roberts specialized in regionalist historical fiction, often writing about his native state and its terrain and also about other upper New England states and scenes. For example, the main characters in Arundel and Rabble in Arms are from Kennebunkport (then called Arundel), the main character in Northwest Passage is from Kittery, Maine and has friends in Portsmouth, New Hampshire, and the main character in Oliver Wiswell is from Milton, Massachusetts.

== Early life ==
Roberts graduated in 1908 from Cornell University, where he wrote the lyrics for two Cornell fight songs, including Fight for Cornell. He was also a member of the Quill and Dagger society. He was later awarded honorary doctorates from three New England colleges: Dartmouth College, in Hanover, New Hampshire; Colby College, in Waterville, Maine; and Middlebury College, in Middlebury, Vermont.

== Journalism ==
After graduation, Roberts spent eight years working as a newspaperman for the Boston Post. In 1917, he enlisted in the U.S. army for World War I. He was assigned to intelligence and promoted to a lieutenant, serving with that section in the American Expeditionary Force Siberia during the Russian Civil War, rather than at the European front.

The contacts that he made in that role enabled him to become a European correspondent for the Saturday Evening Post after the war. He was the first American journalist to cover the 1923 Beer Hall Putsch, Adolf Hitler's failed attempt to seize power. Roberts described working for the Post's legendary editor George Horace Lorimer as follows: "I told him my ideas, which he instantly rejected or accepted ... The price to be paid for a story was never discussed, and Lorimer was always generous."

== Historical fiction ==
Writer Booth Tarkington, a neighbor of Roberts in Kennebunkport, Maine, convinced him that he would never find the time to succeed as a novelist while working as a journalist. Tarkington agreed to help by editing Roberts's early novels. Although Roberts continued to sell a few essays to the Post, his next few years were largely dedicated to historical fiction.

Ultimately, Tarkington edited all of Roberts's novels through Oliver Wiswell (1940). Roberts said in his autobiography that he offered Tarkington co-writing credit on both Northwest Passage and Oliver Wiswell in acknowledgement of Tarkington's extensive revisions to each. He also dedicated both those novels and Rabble in Arms to Tarkington, who continued to assist Roberts until Tarkington's death in 1946.

Roberts's historical fiction often focused on rehabilitating unpopular persons and causes in American history. A key character in Arundel and Rabble in Arms is the American officer and eventual traitor Benedict Arnold, with Roberts focusing on Arnold's expedition to Quebec and the Battle of Quebec in the first novel and the Battle of Valcour Island, the Saratoga campaign and the Battles of Saratoga in the second. Meanwhile, the hero of Northwest Passage was Major Robert Rogers and his company, Rogers' Rangers, although Rogers fought for the British during the American Revolutionary War. Oliver Wiswell focuses on a Loyalist officer during the American Revolution and covers the entire war, from famous events such as the Siege of Boston, the Battle of Bunker Hill, the New York and New Jersey campaign through the Battle of Fort Washington, and the Franco-American alliance, to less-remembered events such as the Convention Army, the exodus to Kentucky County, the Siege of Ninety-Six, and the resettlement of the United Empire Loyalists, as well as providing a later look at both a dissolute Rogers and a frustrated Arnold among the British.

George Orwell reviewed The Lively Lady in the New English Weekly in 1936, describing it as "blood-and-thundery stuff ... chiefly interesting as showing that the old-fashioned nineteenth-century type of American bumptiousness ... is still going strong."

As a result of his research into the Arnold expedition, Roberts published a work of nonfiction, March to Quebec: Journals of the Members of Arnold's Expedition, a compilation of journals and letters written by participants in the campaign. During Roberts's research into the life and career of Major Rogers, his researcher uncovered transcripts of both of Rogers's courts-martial (once as the accuser and once as the accused), which had been thought lost for over a century, and these were published in the second volume of a special two-volume edition of Northwest Passage. Rpberts and his wife Anna translated into English the French writer Médéric Louis Élie Moreau de Saint-Méry's account of his journey through North America in the 1790s. His last published work was The Battle of Cowpens, a brief history of that battle, issued after his death, in 1958.

One of Lorimer's last acts as editor of the Saturday Evening Post was to serialize Northwest Passage in 1936 and 1937. As a result of the success of the serialization, the book when published became the second-best-selling novel in 1937 and fifth best for the year 1938. Oliver Wiswell also spent two years in the top ten (1940 and 1941), and Lydia Bailey reached the top ten in 1947. One of Roberts's closest friends and neighbors, the novelist A. Hamilton Gibbs, later stated that he believed that Roberts probably "wrote himself out" after Oliver Wiswell and certainly had done so after Lydia Bailey.

Key historical novels by Roberts and their topics include:

- Arundel (1929), on the American Revolution through the Battle of Quebec
- The Lively Lady (1931), on the War of 1812
- Rabble in Arms (1933), the sequel to Arundel, on the American Revolution through the Battles of Saratoga
- Captain Caution (1934), on the War of 1812
- Northwest Passage (1937), on the French and Indian War and the Jonathan Carver expedition
- Oliver Wiswell (1940), on the American Revolution from a Loyalist's perspective, from the Siege of Boston to the United Empire Loyalists
- Lydia Bailey (1947), on the Haitian Revolution and the First Barbary War
- Boon Island (1955), on a 1710 shipwreck on Boon Island, Maine

In 1957, two months before his death, Roberts received a Pulitzer Prize Special Citation "for his historical novels which have long contributed to the creation of greater interest in our early American history." He died, aged 71, in Kennebunkport.

== Controversies ==
=== Immigration ===
While a reporter for the Saturday Evening Post in the early 1920s, Roberts wrote many magazine articles and a book during the period immediately following World War I that urged strong legal restrictions on immigration from eastern and southern Europe and from Mexico. He warned of the dangers of immigration from places other than northwestern Europe. He became a leading voice for stricter immigration laws and testified before a congressional committee on the subject.

He wrote:

“If America doesn’t keep out the queer alien mongrelized people of Southern and Eastern Europe, her crop of citizens will eventually be dwarfed and mongrelized in turn.”

In Why Europe Leaves Home, derived from his Post articles, Roberts referred to Jews as "human parasites". He was separately quoted warning against further "Semitic" immigration to America, which he feared would turn the U.S. population into a "worthless and futile" hybrid race.

=== Florida land boom ===
Three of Roberts's first books were written at least in part to promote the Florida land boom of the 1920s. They were Sun Hunting (1922), Florida Loafing (1925), and Florida (1926). Many people lost a lot of money in the bust that followed. These books were usually omitted from the lists of “other books by this author” published in the front pages of his later works.

=== Dowsing ===
In the 1940s, Roberts became acquainted with Henry Gross, a retired Maine game warden and amateur water dowser. He and Gross began a long association to use Gross's claimed dowsing abilities to find deposits of water, petroleum, uranium, and diamonds, through a corporation named Water Unlimited, Inc. Roberts documented his experiences in three nonfiction books that were popular successes but were strongly criticized by the scientific community. He joked that he should have given The Seventh Sense the subtitle Or How to Lose Friends and Alienate People.

=== Maine cooking ===
When Roberts was working on Trending Into Maine, he published a chapter in the Saturday Evening Post that was dedicated to dishes he remembered having as a boy growing up in Maine. Several months after the chapter was published, he began to receive mail from residents and ex-residents who were troubled that he neglected to mention many of the dishes they knew and loved from the Pine Tree State. Roberts was distressed by the letters but decided to keep them, and they were eventually compiled by his secretary, Marjorie Mosser. She eventually included many of the letters and provide recipes in the cookbook Good Maine Food, which was first published in 1939. Roberts wrote the introduction to the book and a chapter on diet.

== Books ==
- Europe's Morning After (1921), a collection of Saturday Evening Post essays
- Why Europe Leaves Home (1922), a collection of Saturday Evening Post essays on immigration
- Sun Hunting: Adventures and Observations among the Native and Migratory Tribes of Florida (1922), humorous essays, Florida promotion
- Black Magic (1924), a collection of Saturday Evening Post essays
- Concentrated New England: A Sketch of Calvin Coolidge (1924), an informal biography
- Florida Loafing (1925), humorous essays, Florida promotion
- Florida (1926), Florida promotion
- Arundel (1929), a historical novel
- The Lively Lady (1931), a historical novel (see Dartmoor Prison)
- Rabble in Arms (1933), a historical novel
- Captain Caution (1934), a historical novel
- For Authors Only, and Other Gloomy Essays (1935), humorous essays
- It Must Be Your Tonsils (1936), humorous essays
- Northwest Passage (1937), a historical novel
- March to Quebec (1938), a historical compilation
- Trending into Maine (1938), a travelogue
- Oliver Wiswell (1940), a historical novel
- The Kenneth Roberts Reader (1945), a compilation of his works
- Lydia Bailey (1947), a historical novel
- Moreau de St.-Mery's American Journey 1793–1798 (1947), English translation, with Anna M. Roberts) -- history
- I Wanted to Write (1949), autobiography
- Henry Gross and his Dowsing Rod (1951), on dowsing
- The Seventh Sense (1953), on dowsing
- Boon Island (1955), a historical novel
- Water Unlimited (1957), on dowsing
- The Battle of Cowpens (1958), a historical essay

Arundel, The Lively Lady, Captain Caution and Northwest Passage were published as Armed Services Editions during WWII.

== See also ==
Marie de Sabrevois
