= List of adventure films of the 1930s =

A list of adventure films released in the 1930s.

== 1930 ==
Title	Director	Cast	Country	Subgenre/Notes
The Big Trail	Raoul Walsh	John Wayne, Marguerite Churchill, Tyrone Power Sr., El Brendel	United States	Epic western, wagon train
The Black Watch	John Ford	Victor McLaglen, Myrna Loy	United States	
Dangerous Paradise	William A. Wellman	Nancy Carroll, Richard Arlen, Warner Oland, Gustav von Seyffertitz	United States	
A Daughter of the Congo	Oscar Micheaux	Kathleen Noisette, Lorenzo Tucker	United States	
General Crack	Alan Crosland	John Barrymore, Marian Nixon, Armida, Lowell Sherman	United States	
The Green Goddess	Alfred E. Green	George Arliss, H. B. Warner, Alice Joyce	United States	
Hell Harbor	Henry King	Lupe Vélez, Jean Hersholt, John Holland	United States	Romantic adventure
Hell's Island	Edward Sloman	Jack Holt, Ralph Graves, Dorothy Sebastian	United States	
The Man Hunter	D. Ross Lederman	Rin Tin Tin	United States	
Morocco	Josef von Sternberg	Gary Cooper, Marlene Dietrich, Adolphe Menjou	United States	Desert adventure
Paradise Island	Bert Glennon	Marceline Day, Kenneth Harlan	United States	
Renegades	Victor Fleming	Warner Baxter, Myrna Loy, Noah Beery	United States	
The Sea God	George Abbott	Richard Arlen, Fay Wray, Eugene Pallette	United States	Sea adventure
The Sea Wolf	Alfred Santell	Milton Sills, Raymond Hackett	United States	Sea adventure
The Silver Horde	George Archainbaud	Evelyn Brent, Joel McCrea, Jean Arthur, Blanche Sweet	United States	Sea adventure
The Spoilers	Edwin Carewe	Gary Cooper, Kay Johnson, Betty Compson	United States	Western
Storm over Mont Blanc	Arnold Fanck	Leni Riefenstahl, Sepp Rist	Germany	Mountaineering adventure
Vengeance	Archie Mayo	Jack Holt, Dorothy Revier	United States	
Women Everywhere	Alexander Korda	J. Harold Murray, Fifi D'Orsay	United States	Musical

== 1931 ==
Title	Director	Cast	Country	Subgenre/Notes
The Adventurer of Tunis	Willi Wolff	Ellen Richter, Theo Shall, Charles Puffy	Germany	
Beau Ideal	Herbert Brenon	Ralph Forbes, Lester Vail, Irene Rich, Loretta Young	United States	
Corsair	Roland West	Chester Morris	United States	Sea adventure
Danger Island	Ray Taylor	Kenneth Harlan, Lucile Browne, Walter Miller, Andy Devine	United States	Serial
Dirigible	Frank Capra	Jack Holt, Ralph Graves, Fay Wray	United States	
East of Borneo	George Melford	Rose Hobart, Charles Bickford, Georges Renavent, Lupita Tovar	United States	Jungle adventure
Fifty Fathoms Deep	Roy William Neill	Jack Holt, Loretta Sayers, Richard Cromwell	United States	Sea adventure
King of the Wild	B. Reeves Eason, Richard Thorpe	Walter Miller, Nora Lane, Dorothy Christy, Boris Karloff	United States	Serial
Never the Twain Shall Meet	W. S. Van Dyke	Leslie Howard, Conchita Montenegro	United States	Sea adventure
Trader Horn	W. S. Van Dyke	Harry Carey, Edwina Booth, Duncan Renaldo, Mutia Omoolu	United States	
The Unholy Garden	George Fitzmaurice	Ronald Colman, Fay Wray	United States	

== 1932 ==
Title	Director	Cast	Country	Subgenre/Notes
L'Atlantide	G. W. Pabst	Brigitte Helm	France; Germany	
Baroud	Rex Ingram, Alice Terry	Pierre Batcheff, Rosita Garcia	France; United Kingdom	
The Black Hussar	Gerhard Lamprecht	Conrad Veidt, Mady Christians	Germany	
Bring 'Em Back Alive	Clyde E. Elliott	Frank Buck	United States	Documentary
Chandu the Magician	William Cameron Menzies, Marcel Varnel	Edmund Lowe, Bela Lugosi, Irene Ware, Henry B. Walthall	United States	Secret agent
Devil on Deck	Wallace Fox	Reed Howes, Molly O'Day, Wheeler Oakman, June Marlowe	United States	Sea adventure
F.P.1	Karl Hartl	Hans Albers, Sybille Schmitz, Paul Hartmann, Peter Lorre	Germany	
Hell's Headquarters	Andrew L. Stone	Jack Mulhall, Barbara Weeks	United States	
Island of Lost Souls	Erle C. Kenton	Charles Laughton, Richard Arlen	United States	Horror adventure
Jungle Mystery	Ray Taylor	Tom Tyler	United States	Serial
Kongo	William J. Cowen	Walter Huston, Lupe Vélez, Conrad Nagel, Virginia Bruce	United States	Horror adventure
The Mask of Fu Manchu	Charles Brabin, Charles Vidor, King Vidor	Boris Karloff, Lewis Stone, Karen Morley, Charles Starrett	United States	Horror adventure
The Most Dangerous Game	Irving Pichel, Ernest B. Schoedsack	Joel McCrea, Fay Wray, Leslie Banks, Robert Armstrong, Noble Johnson	United States	Horror adventure, desert island, jungle
The Mummy	Karl Freund	Boris Karloff, Zita Johann	United States	Horror adventure
Peter Voss, Thief of Millions	E. A. Dupont	Willi Forst, Alice Treff, Paul Hörbiger, Otto Wernicke	Germany	Adventure comedy
The Rebel	Curtis Bernhardt, Luis Trenker	Luis Trenker, Luise Ullrich	Germany	
Red Dust	Victor Fleming	Clark Gable, Jean Harlow, Mary Astor	United States	Romantic adventure
Roar of the Dragon	Wesley Ruggles	Richard Dix, Gwili Andre, Edward Everett Horton, ZaSu Pitts, C. Henry Gordon	United States	
The Savage Girl	Harry L. Fraser	Rochelle Hudson, Harry Myers	United States	Jungle adventure
Shanghai Express	Josef von Sternberg	Marlene Dietrich, Anna May Wong, Clive Brook	United States	
Tarzan the Ape Man	W. S. Van Dyke	Johnny Weissmuller, Maureen O'Sullivan	United States	Jungle adventure
The Three Musketeers	Henri Diamant-Berger	Aimé Simon-Girard, Henri Rollan, Thomy Bourdelle, Jean-Louis Allibert	France	
Tiger Shark	Howard Hawks	Edward G. Robinson, Richard Arlen, Zita Johann	United States	Sea adventure
War Correspondent	Paul Sloane	Jack Holt, Ralph Graves, Lila Lee	United States	
The White God	George Schnéevoigt	Paul Richter, Mona Mårtenson, Rudolf Klein-Rogge	Denmark; Germany	Arctic adventure
White Zombie	Victor Hugo Halperin	Bela Lugosi	United States	Horror adventure

== 1933 ==
Title	Director	Cast	Country	Subgenre/Notes
The 1002nd Night	Alexandre Volkoff	Ivan Mosjoukine, Tania Fédor, Natalya Lisenko	France	
Below the Sea	Albert S. Rogell	Fay Wray, Ralph Bellamy	United States	Sea adventure
The Bitter Tea of General Yen	Frank Capra	Barbara Stanwyck, Nils Asther, Walter Connolly, Toshia Mori	United States	Romantic adventure
Dick Turpin	Victor Hanbury, John Stafford	Victor McLaglen	United Kingdom	
Don Quixote	G.W. Pabst	Feodor Chaliapin, George Robey, Oscar Asche, Emily Fitzroy	France; United Kingdom	Romantic adventure, adventure drama
The Flaming Signal	George Jeske, Charles E. Roberts	John David Horsley, Marceline Day, Noah Beery, Mischa Auer	United States	
King Kong	Merian C. Cooper, Ernest B. Schoedsack	Fay Wray, Robert Armstrong, Bruce Cabot, Frank Reicher	United States	Jungle adventure
Kiss of Araby	Phil Rosen	Maria Alba, Walter Byron, Claire Windsor	United States	
Laughing at Life	Ford Beebe	Victor McLaglen, Conchita Montenegro	United States	
The Perils of Pauline	Ray Taylor	Evalyn Knapp, Robert Allen	United States	Serial
Refugees	Gustav Ucicky	Hans Albers, Käthe von Nagy	Germany	
Savage Gold	George Miller Dyott	George Miller Dyott	United States	Documentary
So This Is Africa	Edward F. Cline	Bert Wheeler, Robert Woolsey	United States	Adventure comedy
The Son of Kong	Ernest B. Schoedsack	Robert Armstrong, Helen Mack, Frank Reicher, John Marston	United States	Jungle adventure
S.O.S. Eisberg	Arnold Fanck	Leni Riefenstahl, Gustav Diessl, Sepp Rist, Ernst Udet	Germany	Arctic adventure
Tarzan the Fearless	Robert F. Hill	Larry "Buster" Crabbe, Jacqueline Wells, E. Alyn Warren	United States	Serial, jungle adventure
The Three Musketeers	Armand Schaefer, Colbert Clark	John Wayne, Jack Mulhall, Raymond Hatton, Francis X. Bushman Jr.	United States	Serial
Timbuctoo	Walter Summers, Arthur B. Woods	Henry Kendall, Margot Grahame	United Kingdom	Adventure comedy
When Strangers Marry	Clarence G. Badger	Jack Holt, Lilian Bond	United States	
White Woman	Stuart Walker	Carole Lombard, Charles Laughton	United States	
The Woman I Stole	Irving Cummings	Jack Holt, Fay Wray, Noah Beery	United States	

== 1934 ==
Title	Director	Cast	Country	Subgenre/Notes
Adventure Girl	Herman C. Raymaker	Joan Lowell	United States	Docudrama
The Affairs of Cellini	Gregory La Cava	Fredric March, Constance Bennett, Fay Wray, Frank Morgan	United States	
Beyond Bengal	Harry Schenck	Harry Schenck	United States	Documentary
Black Moon	Roy William Neill	Fay Wray, Jack Holt, Dorothy Burgess	United States	Horror adventure
Le Bossu	René Sti	Robert Vidalin	France	
Cartouche	Jacques Daroy	Paul Lalloz	France	
Colonel Blood	W. P. Lipscomb	Frank Cellier, Anne Grey, Mary Lawson, Allan Jeayes	United Kingdom	
The Eternal Dream	Arnold Fanck	Sepp Rist, Brigitte Horney	Germany	Mountaineering adventure
Four Frightened People	Cecil B. DeMille	Herbert Marshall, Claudette Colbert, Mary Boland, William Gargan	United States	Jungle adventure, desert island
Le Grand Jeu	Jacques Feyder	Pierre Richard-Willm, Marie Bell, Charles Vanel, Françoise Rosay	France	
The Lost Jungle	David Howard, Armand Schaefer	Clyde Beatty	United States	Serial
The Lost Patrol	John Ford	Victor McLaglen, Boris Karloff, Wallace Ford, Reginald Denny	United States	Desert
A Man Wants to Get to Germany	Paul Wegener	Karl Ludwig Diehl, Brigitte Horney	Germany	Sea adventure
Marie Galante	Henry King	Spencer Tracy, Ketti Gallian	United States	
Murder in Trinidad	Louis King	Nigel Bruce, Heather Angel, Victor Jory	United States	Mystery
North Pole, Ahoy	Andrew Marton	Walter Riml, Gustav Lantschner	Germany	Arctic adventure, adventure comedy
Peer Gynt	Fritz Wendhausen	Hans Albers, Olga Chekhova, Otto Wernicke	Germany	
Pirate Treasure	Ray Taylor	Richard Talmadge	United States	Serial
The Private Life of Don Juan	Alexander Korda	Douglas Fairbanks, Merle Oberon	United Kingdom	
Pursued	Louis King	Rosemary Ames, Victor Jory, Russell Hardie	United States	
Red Morning	Wallace Fox	Steffi Duna, Regis Toomey, Raymond Hatton	United States	Sea adventure
The Riders of German East Africa	Herbert Selpin	Sepp Rist	Germany	
The Scarlet Pimpernel	Harold Young	Leslie Howard, Merle Oberon, Raymond Massey, Nigel Bruce	United Kingdom	
Schwarzer Jäger Johanna	Johannes Meyer	Marianne Hoppe, Paul Hartmann, Gustaf Gründgens	Germany	
A Scream in the Night	Fred C. Newmeyer	Lon Chaney Jr.	United States	Mystery
Sixteen Fathoms Deep	Armand Schaefer	Lon Chaney Jr., Sally O'Neil	United States	Sea adventure
Tarzan and His Mate	Cedric Gibbons, Jack Conway	Johnny Weissmuller, Maureen O'Sullivan	United States	Jungle adventure
Treasure Island	Victor Fleming	Wallace Beery, Jackie Cooper, Lionel Barrymore, Lewis Stone, Nigel Bruce	United States	Pirate film
Wild Cargo	Armand Denis	Frank Buck	United States	Documentary
Young Eagles	Edward Laurier, Vin Moore	Bobby Cox, Jim Vance	United States	Serial, family-oriented adventure

== 1935 ==
Title	Director	Cast	Country	Subgenre/Notes
La Bandera	Julien Duvivier	Jean Gabin, Annabella	France	
The Best Man Wins	Erle C. Kenton	Jack Holt, Edmund Lowe, Bela Lugosi, Florence Rice	United States	Sea adventure
The Black Room	Roy William Neill	Boris Karloff	United States	Horror adventure
The Call of the Jungle	Harry Piel	Harry Piel, Gerda Maurus	Germany	
The Call of the Savage	Lew Landers	Noah Beery Jr.	United States	Serial
The Call of the Wild	William A. Wellman	Clark Gable, Loretta Young	United States	
Captain Blood	Michael Curtiz	Errol Flynn, Olivia de Havilland, Basil Rathbone, Lionel Atwill	United States	Pirate film
China Seas	Tay Garnett	Clark Gable, Jean Harlow, Wallace Beery, Rosalind Russell	United States	Sea adventure, romantic adventure
Clive of India	Richard Boleslawski	Ronald Colman, Loretta Young, Colin Clive	United States	
The Crusades	Cecil B. DeMille	Loretta Young, Henry Wilcoxon, Ian Keith	United States	
Demon of the Himalayas	Andrew Marton	Gustav Diessl	Switzerland	Mountaineering adventure
Drake of England	Arthur B. Woods	Matheson Lang, Athene Seyler, Jane Baxter	United Kingdom	Sea adventure
East of Java	George Melford	Charles Bickford	United States	
Fang and Claw	Frank Buck	Frank Buck	United States	Documentary
Last of the Pagans	Richard Thorpe	Ray Mala, Lotus Long	United States	Sea adventure
The Last Outpost	Louis J. Gasnier, Charles Barton	Cary Grant, Claude Rains	United States	
The Live Wire	Harry S. Webb	Richard Talmadge	United States	Sea adventure
The Lives of a Bengal Lancer	Henry Hathaway	Gary Cooper, Franchot Tone, Richard Cromwell	United States	Romantic adventure
The Lost City	Harry Revier	William Boyd	United States	Serial, fantasy adventure
McGlusky the Sea Rover	Walter Summers	Jack Doyle, Tamara Desni, Henry Mollison	United Kingdom	Sea adventure
Midshipman Easy	Carol Reed	Hughie Green, Roger Livesey, Margaret Lockwood, Robert Adams	United Kingdom	Sea adventure
Mutiny Ahead	Thomas Atkins	Neil Hamilton, Kathleen Burke	United States	Sea adventure
Mutiny on the Bounty	Frank Lloyd	Clark Gable, Charles Laughton, Franchot Tone, Movita	United States	Sea adventure, adventure drama
The Mystery of the Mary Celeste	Denison Clift	Bela Lugosi	United Kingdom	Sea adventure
The New Adventures of Tarzan	Edward A. Kull	Herman Brix	United States	Serial
... nur ein Komödiant	Erich Engel	Rudolf Forster, Paul Wegener	Austria	
Oil for the Lamps of China	Mervyn LeRoy	Pat O'Brien	United States	
Professional Soldier	Tay Garnett	Victor McLaglen, Freddie Bartholomew	United States	
Queen of the Jungle	Robert F. Hill	Mary Kornman, Reed Howes	United States	Serial
La Route impériale	Marcel L'Herbier	Käthe von Nagy, Pierre Richard-Willm, Pierre Renoir	France	
Sanders of the River	Zoltan Korda	Leslie Banks, Paul Robeson, Nina Mae McKinney	United Kingdom	
Savage Fury	Lew Landers	Noah Beery Jr., Walter Miller, Dorothy Short	United States	Jungle adventure
She	Lansing C. Holden, Irving Pichel	Randolph Scott, Helen Gahagan, Helen Mack, Nigel Bruce	United States	
Storm Over the Andes	Christy Cabanne	Jack Holt	United States	
The Three Musketeers	Rowland V. Lee	Walter Abel, Margot Grahame, Paul Lukas	United States	
Under the Pampas Moon	James Tinling	Warner Baxter, Ketti Gallian	United States	Romantic adventure

== 1936 ==
Title	Director	Cast	Country	Subgenre/Notes
Across the Desert	Johann Alexander Hübler-Kahla	Fred Raupach, Heinz Evelt	Germany	
The Adventures of Frank Merriwell	Cliff Smith	Donald Briggs	United States	Serial
The Black Coin	Albert Herman	Ralph Graves	United States	Serial
Black Gold	Russell Hopton	Frankie Darro, LeRoy Mason, Gloria Shea	United States	Action adventure
The Bold Caballero	Wells Root	Robert Livingston	United States	
Captain Calamity	John Reinhardt	George F. Houston	United States	Sea adventure
The Charge of the Light Brigade	Michael Curtiz	Errol Flynn, Olivia de Havilland, Patric Knowles, David Niven	United States	
Dangerous Waters	Lambert Hillyer	Jack Holt, Robert Armstrong	United States	Sea adventure
Darkest Africa	B. Reeves Eason, Joseph Kane	Clyde Beatty, Manuel King, Elaine Shepard	United States	Serial
Down to the Sea	Lewis D. Collins	Russell Hardie, Ben Lyon, Ann Rutherford	United States	Sea adventure
L'Esclave blanc	Jean-Paul Paulin	George Rigaud, Sanlure	France; Italy	
Flash Gordon	Ford Beebe, Robert F. Hill	Buster Crabbe, Jean Rogers, Charles Middleton, Frank Shannon	United States	Serial, space adventure
The General Died at Dawn	Lewis Milestone	Gary Cooper, Madeleine Carroll, Akim Tamiroff	United States	
Isle of Fury	Frank McDonald	Humphrey Bogart, Donald Woods, Margaret Lindsay	United States	
Juan Moreira	Nelo Cosimi	Antonio Podestá, Domingo Sapelli, Guillermo Casali, María Esther Podestá	Argentina	
The Jungle Princess	Wilhelm Thiele	Dorothy Lamour, Ray Milland, Akim Tamiroff	United States	
The Last Four on Santa Cruz	Werner Klingler	Hermann Speelmans, Françoise Rosay, Valéry Inkijinoff	Germany	
The Last of the Mohicans	George B. Seitz	Randolph Scott, Binnie Barnes	United States	Western
The Leathernecks Have Landed	Howard Bretherton	Lew Ayres, Isabel Jewell	United States	
A Legionnaire	Christian-Jaque	Fernandel	France	Adventure comedy
The Lion Man	John P. McCarthy	Jon Hall, Kathleen Burke, Ted Adams	United States	
Michel Strogoff	Jacques de Baroncelli, Richard Eichberg	Anton Walbrook, Charles Vanel	France	
The Mine with the Iron Door	David Howard	Richard Arlen, Cecilia Parker, Henry B. Walthall	United States	
North of Nome	William Nigh	Jack Holt	United States	
Petticoat Fever	George Fitzmaurice	Robert Montgomery, Myrna Loy, Reginald Owen	United States	Arctic adventure, Romantic comedy
Port Arthur	Nicolas Farkas	Anton Walbrook, Danielle Darrieux, Charles Vanel	France	
Revolt of the Zombies	Victor Hugo Halperin	Dorothy Stone, Dean Jagger	United States	Horror adventure
Rhodes of Africa	Berthold Viertel	Walter Huston, Oskar Homolka	United Kingdom	
Robinson Crusoe of Clipper Island	Ray Taylor, Mack V. Wright	Ray Mala, Mamo Clark, Herbert Rawlinson	United States	Serial, US spies in Polynesia
Le Roman d'un spahi	Michel Bernheim	George Rigaud, Mireille Balin, Princesse Khandou	France	
Sea Spoilers	Frank R. Strayer	John Wayne, Nan Grey	United States	Sea adventure
Song of Freedom	J. Elder Wills	Paul Robeson, Elisabeth Welch, Esme Percy	United Kingdom	Adventure drama
Lo squadrone bianco	Augusto Genina	Antonio Centa, Fosco Giachetti	Italy	
Tarzan Escapes	Richard Thorpe	Johnny Weissmuller, Maureen O'Sullivan	United States	Jungle adventure
Tundra	Norman Dawn	Alfred Delcambre	United States	
Uncivilised	Charles Chauvel	Margot Rhys, Dennis Hoey	Australia	
Under Blazing Heavens	Gustav Ucicky	Hans Albers, Lotte Lang	Germany	Sea adventure
Under Two Flags	Frank Lloyd	Ronald Colman, Claudette Colbert, Victor McLaglen, Rosalind Russell	United States	
Undersea Kingdom	B. Reeves Eason, Joseph Kane	Ray "Crash" Corrigan, Lois Wilde, Monte Blue	United States	Serial
We're in the Legion Now!	Crane Wilbur	Reginald Denny, Esther Ralston	United States	Adventure comedy
White Death	Edwin G. Bowen	Zane Grey	Australia	Sea adventure
White Hunter	Irving Cummings	Warner Baxter, June Lang	United States	
Wings Over Africa	Ladislao Vajda	Joan Gardner, Ian Colin, James Harcourt	United Kingdom	

== 1937 ==
Title	Director	Cast	Country	Subgenre/Notes
Adventure's End	Arthur Lubin	John Wayne	United States	Sea adventure
Alarm in Peking	Herbert Selpin	Gustav Fröhlich	Germany	
Aloha, le chant des îles	Léon Mathot	Jean Murat, Danièle Parola, Arletty	France	
The Black Corsair	Amleto Palermi	Ciro Verratti, Silvana Jachino	Italy	Pirate film
Captains Courageous	Victor Fleming	Spencer Tracy, Freddie Bartholomew, Lionel Barrymore	United States	Adventure drama, sea adventure
China Passage	Edward Killy	Vinton Haworth, Gordon Jones, Constance Worth, Leslie Fenton	United States	Sea adventure, mystery
Condottieri	Luis Trenker	Luis Trenker	Italy; Germany	
Elephant Boy	Robert J. Flaherty	Sabu, Walter Hudd, W. E. Holloway	United Kingdom	
The Emperor's Candlesticks	George Fitzmaurice	William Powell, Luise Rainer, Robert Young, Maureen O'Sullivan, Frank Morgan	United States	
The Forsaken	Jacques Séverac	Jean Servais	France	
The High Command	Thorold Dickinson	Lionel Atwill, Lucie Mannheim, James Mason	United Kingdom	
I Cover the War	Arthur Lubin	John Wayne	United States	
Jungle Jim	Ford Beebe, Clifford Smith	Grant Withers	United States	Serial
Jungle Menace	Harry L. Fraser, George Melford	Frank Buck	United States	Serial
King Solomon's Mines	Robert Stevenson	Cedric Hardwicke, Paul Robeson, Roland Young, Anna Lee	United Kingdom	African adventure
The Legion of Missing Men	Hamilton MacFadden	Ralph Forbes, Ben Alexander, Hala Linda	United States	War adventure
Lost Horizon	Frank Capra	Ronald Colman, Jane Wyatt, Edward Everett Horton, Thomas Mitchell, John Howard	United States	
The Messenger	Raymond Rouleau	Jean Gabin, Gaby Morlay, Jean-Pierre Aumont	France	
The Mysterious Pilot	Spencer Gordon Bennet	Frank Hawks, Dorothy Sebastian	United States	Serial
Outlaws of the Orient	Ernest B. Schoedsack	Jack Holt, Mae Clarke	United States	
The Pearls of the Crown	Sacha Guitry	Sacha Guitry, Raimu, Arletty, Jean-Louis Barrault	France	Adventure comedy
The Prince and the Pauper	William Keighley	Errol Flynn, Billy and Bobby Mauch, Claude Rains	United States	
The Prisoner of Zenda	John Cromwell, W. S. Van Dyke	Ronald Colman, Madeleine Carroll, Douglas Fairbanks Jr., Mary Astor, Raymond Massey, David Niven	United States	Swashbuckler
Return of the Scarlet Pimpernel	Hanns Schwarz	Barry K. Barnes, Sophie Stewart, Margaretta Scott, James Mason	United Kingdom	
Sea Devils	Benjamin Stoloff	Victor McLagen, Preston Foster, Ida Lupino	United States	Sea adventure
The Secrets of the Red Sea	Richard Pottier	Harry Baur, Gaby Basset, Habib Benglia	France	
Slave Ship	Tay Garnett	Warner Baxter, Wallace Beery, Elizabeth Allan, Mickey Rooney	United States	
Southern Mail	Pierre Billon	Pierre Richard-Willm, Jany Holt, Charles Vanel	France	
Three Legionnaires	Hamilton MacFadden	Robert Armstrong, Lyle Talbot, Anne Nagel	United States	Adventure comedy
Tim Tyler's Luck	Ford Beebe, Wyndham Gittens	Frankie Thomas, Frances Robinson, Al Shean, William 'Billy' Benedict	United States	Serial
La Tour de Nesle	Gaston Roudès	Tania Fédor, Jean Weber, Jacques Varennes	France	
Troïka sur la piste blanche	Jean Dréville	Jean Murat, Jany Holt, Charles Vanel	France	
Trouble in Morocco	Ernest B. Schoedsack	Jack Holt, Mae Clarke	United States	
Under the Red Robe	Victor Sjöström	Conrad Veidt, Annabella, Raymond Massey	United Kingdom	
Wallaby Jim of the Islands	Charles Lamont	George F. Houston	United States	Sea adventure
West of Shanghai	John Farrow	Boris Karloff, Beverly Roberts, Ricardo Cortez	United States	
The Wife of General Ling	Ladislao Vajda	Griffith Jones, Valéry Inkijinoff, Adrianne Renn	United Kingdom	
Windjammer	Ewing Scott	George O'Brien	United States	Sea adventure
Woman of Malacca	Marc Allégret	Edwige Feuillère, Pierre Richard-Willm	France	Romantic adventure
The Yellow Flag	Gerhard Lamprecht	Hans Albers, Olga Chekhova, Dorothea Wieck	Germany	
Zorro Rides Again	John English, William Witney	John Carroll, Helen Christian	United States	Serial, western

== 1938 ==
Title	Director	Cast	Country	Subgenre/Notes
Adventure in Sahara	D. Ross Lederman	Paul Kelly, C. Henry Gordon, Lorna Gray	United States	
The Adventures of Marco Polo	Archie Mayo	Gary Cooper, Basil Rathbone	United States	
The Adventures of Robin Hood	Michael Curtiz, William Keighley	Errol Flynn, Olivia de Havilland, Basil Rathbone, Claude Rains	United States	Swashbuckler, romantic adventure
Alert in the Mediterranean	Léo Joannon	Pierre Fresnay, Rolf Wanka, Kim Peacock	France	Sea adventure
Bar du sud	Henri Fescourt	Charles Vanel, Tania Fédor	France	
The Buccaneer	Cecil B. DeMille	Fredric March, Franciska Gaal, Akim Tamiroff	United States	Pirate film
Bulldog Drummond in Africa	Louis King	John Howard, Heather Angel, H. B. Warner, J. Carrol Naish	United States	
Call of the Yukon	John T. Coyle, B. Reeves Eason	Richard Arlen	United States	
Capriccio	Karl Ritter	Lilian Harvey, Viktor Staal	Germany	Adventure comedy
The Challenge	Luis Trenker, Milton Rosmer	Robert Douglas, Luis Trenker	United Kingdom	
Coral Reefs	Maurice Gleize	Jean Gabin, Michèle Morgan, Pierre Renoir	France	Sea adventure
The Drum	Zoltan Korda	Sabu, Raymond Massey, Valerie Hobson, Roger Livesey	United Kingdom	
Ettore Fieramosca	Alessandro Blasetti	Gino Cervi, Mario Ferrari, Elisa Cegani	Italy	
Flash Gordon's Trip to Mars	Ford Beebe, Robert F. Hill	Buster Crabbe, Jean Rogers, Charles Middleton, Frank Shannon	United States	Serial, space adventure
Flight into Nowhere	Lewis D. Collins	Jack Holt, Dick Purcell	United States	
Hawk of the Wilderness	John English, William Witney	Herman Brix, Ray Mala, Noble Johnson	United States	Serial, uncharted jungle island
Heart of the North	Lewis Seiler	Dick Foran	United States	Western
Her Jungle Love	George Archainbaud	Dorothy Lamour, Ray Milland	United States	Romantic adventure
I Was an Adventuress	Raymond Bernard	Edwige Feuillère, Jean Murat, Jean-Max, Jean Tissier	France	
If I Were King	Frank Lloyd	Ronald Colman, Basil Rathbone	United States	
The Indian Tomb	Richard Eichberg	La Jana, Philip Dorn, Gustav Diessl, Theo Lingen	Germany	
Kidnapped	Alfred L. Werker	Warner Baxter, Freddie Bartholomew	United States	
Mollenard	Robert Siodmak	Harry Baur, Pierre Renoir, Albert Préjean, Gabrielle Dorziat	France	Sea adventure
The Mountain Calls	Luis Trenker	Luis Trenker, Heidemarie Hatheyer	Germany	Mountaineering adventure
Old Bones of the River	Marcel Varnel	Will Hay	United Kingdom	
La Piste du sud	Pierre Billon	Albert Préjean, Jean-Louis Barrault, Ketti Gallian	France	
Rail Pirates	Christian-Jaque	Charles Vanel, Erich von Stroheim, Suzy Prim, Marcel Dalio, Valéry Inkijinoff	France	
Rose of the Rio Grande	William Nigh	Movita, John Carroll	United States	
Rubber	Eduard von Borsody	René Deltgen, Gustav Diessl	Germany	
S.O.S. Sahara	Jacques de Baroncelli	Charles Vanel, Jean-Pierre Aumont	France; Germany	
The Secret of Treasure Island	Elmer Clifton	Don Terry, Gwen Gaze	United States	Serial, sea adventure
Spawn of the North	Henry Hathaway	George Raft, Henry Fonda, Dorothy Lamour	United States	Sea adventure
Storm Over Asia	Richard Oswald	Conrad Veidt, Sessue Hayakawa, Madeleine Robinson, Michiko Tanaka	France	Adventure drama
Storm Over Bengal	Sidney Salkow	Patric Knowles, Richard Cromwell, Rochelle Hudson	United States	
Suez	Allan Dwan	Tyrone Power, Loretta Young, Annabella	United States	
Tarzan's Revenge	D. Ross Lederman	Glenn Morris, Eleanor Holm	United States	
The Tiger of Eschnapur	Richard Eichberg	La Jana, Philip Dorn, Gustav Diessl, Theo Lingen	Germany	
Too Hot to Handle	Jack Conway	Clark Gable, Myrna Loy, Walter Pidgeon	United States	Adventure comedy
Trade Winds	Tay Garnett	Fredric March, Joan Bennett, Ralph Bellamy, Ann Sothern	United States	Adventure comedy, sea adventure
Under the Southern Cross	Guido Brignone	Antonio Centa, Doris Duranti, Enrico Glori, Giovanni Grasso	Italy	
Vessel of Wrath	Erich Pommer	Charles Laughton, Elsa Lanchester, Robert Newton	United Kingdom	Adventure comedy
The Woman from the End of the World	Jean Epstein	Charles Vanel, Jean-Pierre Aumont, Germaine Rouer	France	Sea adventure

== 1939 ==
Title	Director	Cast	Country	Subgenre/Notes
The Adventures of Huckleberry Finn	Richard Thorpe	Mickey Rooney, Rex Ingram	United States	
Angelica	Jean Choux	Viviane Romance, Georges Flamant	France	
Barricade	Gregory Ratoff	Alice Faye, Warner Baxter	United States	
Beau Geste	William A. Wellman	Gary Cooper, Ray Milland, Robert Preston, Broderick Crawford, Brian Donlevy, Susan Hayward	United States	Colonial (French Foreign Legion)
Brand im Ozean	Günther Rittau	Hans Söhnker, René Deltgen, Winnie Markus	Germany	Sea adventure
Buck Rogers	Ford Beebe, Saul A. Goodkind	Buster Crabbe, Constance Moore, Jackie Moran	United States	Serial, science fiction adventure
Cadets	Karl Ritter	Mathias Wieman, Andrews Engelmann, Carsta Löck	Germany	
Congo Express	Eduard von Borsody	Marianne Hoppe, Willy Birgel, René Deltgen	Germany	
Five Came Back	John Farrow	Chester Morris, Lucille Ball, Wendy Barrie, John Carradine	United States	Adventure drama
The Five Cents of Lavarede	Maurice Cammage	Fernandel	France	Adventure comedy
The Flying Deuces	A. Edward Sutherland	Stan Laurel, Oliver Hardy	United States	Adventure comedy
The Four Feathers	Zoltan Korda	John Clements, Ralph Richardson, C. Aubrey Smith	United States; United Kingdom	Colonial (British in Sudan)
Gunga Din	George Stevens	Cary Grant, Victor McLaglen, Douglas Fairbanks, Jr.	United States	Colonial (British India)
Island of Lost Men	Kurt Neumann	Anna May Wong, J. Carrol Naish, Broderick Crawford, Anthony Quinn, Rudolf Forster	United States	
Jamaica Inn	Alfred Hitchcock	Charles Laughton, Maureen O'Hara, Hay Petrie	United Kingdom	
La Loi du Nord	Jacques Feyder	Michèle Morgan, Pierre Richard-Willm, Charles Vanel	France	
Mandrake the Magician	Norman Deming, Sam Nelson	Warren Hull, Doris Weston, Al Kikume	United States	Serial
Mutiny on the Blackhawk	Christy Cabanne	Richard Arlen, Andy Devine, Noah Beery	United States	
Only Angels Have Wings	Howard Hawks	Cary Grant, Jean Arthur, Thomas Mitchell	United States	
Stanley and Livingstone	Henry King	Spencer Tracy, Nancy Kelly, Richard Greene, Cedric Hardwicke	United States	
The Sun Never Sets	Rowland V. Lee	Douglas Fairbanks Jr., Basil Rathbone, Lionel Atwill	United States	Jungle adventure
Tarzan Finds a Son!	Richard Thorpe	Johnny Weissmuller, Maureen O'Sullivan	United States	Jungle adventure
The Three Musketeers	Allan Dwan	Don Ameche, Ritz Brothers	United States	Adventure comedy, musical
Tropic Fury	Christy Cabanne	Richard Arlen, Andy Devine	United States	
Uproar in Damascus	Gustav Ucicky	Brigitte Horney, Joachim Gottschalk	Germany	
Vidocq	Jacques Daroy	André Brulé	France	
Water for Canitoga	Herbert Selpin	Hans Albers	Germany	Western
The Wizard of Oz	Victor Fleming	Judy Garland, Frank Morgan, Ray Bolger, Bert Lahr, Jack Haley, Billie Burke, Margaret Hamilton	United States	
Zorro's Fighting Legion	William Witney, John English	Reed Hadley, Sheila Darcy, William Corson, Leander de Cordova	United States	Serial
