= Ray Mala =

American actor

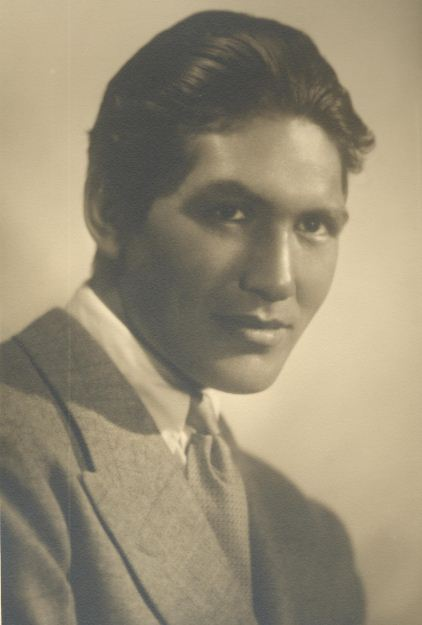
- Photograph by Melbourne Spurr, c. 1933
- Born: Ray Wise; December 27, 1906; Candle, District of Alaska, U.S.
- Died: September 23, 1952 (aged 45); Hollywood, California, U.S.
- Occupation: Actor
- Years active: 1921–1952
- Spouses: Gertrude Becker (m. 1932, divorced) Galina Kropotkin Liss (m. 1937)

Ray Mala (born Ray Agnaqsiaq Wise, also known as Ach-nach-chiak (Iñupiaq orthography: Aġnatchiaq or Aġnasiaq); December 27, 1906 – September 23, 1952) was a prominent Alaska Native actor. He was one of Hollywood's Native American movie actors along with Lillian St. Cyr, Jesse Cornplanter, Chief Yowlachie, William Eagle Shirt, and Will Rogers who also had successful careers during that time. Mala's career peaked in the 1930s and he was best known for his lead role in Republic Pictures' 14-part serial Robinson Crusoe of Clipper Island (1936) following his feature role in MGM's Eskimo, directed by Woody Van Dyke. He was named a "Top Ten Alaskan" by TIME Magazine in 2009.

== Early life ==
Ray Mala was born Ray Wise in the small village of Candle, Alaska, to a Russian Jewish immigrant father and an Iñupiaq mother. He was born during a time when Alaska was still only a territory of the United States and was viewed by most Americans as a vast, mysterious frontier. In 1921 an explorer, Captain Frank Kleinschmidt, ventured to Alaska on an expedition to produce Primitive Love, a film in which a 14-year-old Mala made his screen debut. The teenager acted in front of the camera in a minor role and at times served as a cameraman while shooting on location. Later, from 1921 to 1924, Mala also accompanied Knud Rasmussen, the Danish Arctic explorer and writer, as official cameraman on Rasmussen's trip The Great Sled Journey to collect and describe Inuit songs and legends.

== Career ==
In 1925, Mala arrived in Hollywood and got a job as a cameraman with Fox Film Corporation (before the creation of 20th Century-Fox). Not long after, Mala landed his first lead role in the silent film Igloo for Universal Pictures. Igloo was a success and led to his being cast as the lead in MGM's Eskimo (also known as Mala the Magnificent). Louis B. Mayer sent director Woody Van Dyke to the Alaska Territory to film, with many Alaska Natives in the cast, along with Japanese actress Lotus Long (portraying one of Mala's wives) and Chinese actress Ling Wong. Eskimo was produced by Irving Thalberg and premiered at the Astor Theatre in Times Square, New York City, in 1933. The movie was billed as "the biggest picture ever made" by MGM, but after a sluggish opening, MGM quickly decided to change the title to the more sexy Eskimo Wife-Traders. Still, the movie suffered an eventual loss of $236,000 at the box office. The movie's editor, Conrad A. Nervig, won the first Oscar for Best Film Editing for his work on the picture.

Ray Mala gained praise following Eskimo, and as a result MGM cast him as the lead in Last of the Pagans (1935), directed by Richard Thorpe and filmed on location in Tahiti. Mala's next role came in The Jungle Princess (1936), which launched Dorothy Lamour's career. According to the book The Paramount Story, The Jungle Princess was a success and a money maker for the studio. Mala played the lead in Republic Pictures' Robinson Crusoe of Clipper Island (1936), which was one of the first serials the studio made. He shared top billing with Herman Brix in Republic's Hawk of the Wilderness (1938). Other notable films include Green Hell (1940), starring Douglas Fairbanks, Jr.; Flash Gordon Conquers the Universe (1940); Cecil B. DeMille's Union Pacific (1939); Son of Fury (1942), starring Tyrone Power; The Tuttles of Tahiti (1942), starring Charles Laughton; and many others.

Mala also spent time behind the camera. He worked with Academy Award winner Joseph LaShelle on many pictures, including Laura (1944), starring Gene Tierney, and Les Misérables (1952). He was on location in Santa Rosa as a cameraman on Alfred Hitchcock's Shadow of a Doubt (1943). Other films include Meet Me After the Show (1951), starring Betty Grable, and The Fan (1949).

In 1952, Mala reappeared in front of the camera to play in Red Snow opposite Guy Madison. According to the American Film Institute, Red Snow is the first film to deal with the Cold War and the atomic bomb.

== Death ==
Shortly after the release of Red Snow, Mala died from heart problems on the set of his last film. He was only 45. His career in Hollywood spanned almost 30 years. Fifty years after his death, his remains were returned to Alaska, with a reburial ceremony in 2018 inside Anchorage Memorial Park Cemetery.

== Filmography ==
Year	Title	Role	Notes
1933	Eskimo	Mala, aka Kripik	Uncredited
1935	Last of the Pagans	Taro	
1936	Robinson Crusoe of Clipper Island	Agent Ray Mala	
1936	The Jungle Princess	Melan	
1938	Hawk of the Wilderness	Olee John	
1938	The Great Adventures of Wild Bill Hickok	Little Elk	Serial (ch. 5-6)
1938	Hawk of the Wilderness	Kias	Serial
1939	Union Pacific	Indian Finding Cigar Store Indian	Uncredited
1939	Mutiny on the Blackhawk	Wani - Native Slave Leader	
1939	Coast Guard	Eskimo Driver	Uncredited
1940	Green Hell	Mala	
1940	Zanzibar	Mala	
1940	Flash Gordon Conquers the Universe	Prince of the Rock People	Serial (ch. 7-9); uncredited
1940	South of Pago Pago	Native Diver	Uncredited
1940	Girl from God's Country	Joe	
1940	North West Mounted Police	Indian	Uncredited
1940	The Devil's Pipeline	Talamu	
1941	Hold Back the Dawn	Young Mexican Bridegroom	Uncredited
1941	Honolulu Lu	Native Cop	Uncredited
1942	Son of Fury	Marnoa	
1942	The Mad Doctor of Market Street	Barab	
1942	The Girl from Alaska	Charley	
1942	The Tuttles of Tahiti	Nat	
1952	Red Snow	Sgt. Koovuk	Final film role
