= Mademoiselle X =

1945 film

- Directed by: Pierre Billon
- Written by: Marcel Achard; Pierre Billon
- Produced by: Wilfrid Baumgartner; André Paulvé
- Starring: Madeleine Sologne; André Luguet; Ketti Gallian
- Cinematography: Christian Matras
- Edited by: André Gug
- Music by: Jean Marion
- Production companies: Credit National; Films André Paulvé
- Distributed by: DisCina
- Release date: 27 June 1945
- Running time: 100 minutes
- Country: France
- Language: French

Mademoiselle X is a 1945 French drama film directed by Pierre Billon and starring Madeleine Sologne, André Luguet and Ketti Gallian.

It was partly shot at the Saint-Maurice Studios in Paris. The film's sets were designed by the art directors Auguste Capelier and Georges Wakhévitch. The producer André Paulvé had recently been removed by the authorities from The Children of Paradise on account of his partial Jewish heritage and shifted to this less prestigious production, likely due to the intervention of his rival Alfred Greven of Continental Films. The film went into production In May 1944 shortly before the Liberation.

== Cast ==
- Madeleine Sologne as Madeleine Ardouin
- André Luguet as Dominique Ségard
- Ketti Gallian as Catherine Nanteuil
- Aimé Clariond as Michel Courbet
- Pierre Palau as Victor
- André Bervil as Nicolas - l'acteur
- Raymond Rognoni as Le maire
- Charles Lemontier as L'employé des pompes funèbres

== Bibliography ==
- Turk, Edward Baron . Child of Paradise: Marcel Carné and the Golden Age of French Cinema. Harvard University Press, 1989.
