= Suspicion (1956 film) =

1956 film

- Directed by: Pierre Billon
- Written by: Pierre Billon
- Based on: La Pavane des poisons 1950 novel by Maurice Dekobra
- Produced by: Maurice Dekobra; André Labrousse
- Starring: Anne Vernon; Frank Villard; Dora Doll
- Cinematography: André Bac
- Edited by: Georges Arnstam
- Music by: Joseph Kosma
- Production companies: Films Onyx; Les Films de la Licorne
- Distributed by: Discifilm
- Release date: 23 November 1956
- Running time: 93 minutes
- Country: France
- Language: French

Suspicion (French: Soupçons) is a 1956 French crime drama film directed by Pierre Billon and starring Anne Vernon, Frank Villard and Dora Doll. It is based on the 1950 novel La Pavane des poisons by Maurice Dekobra. The film's sets were designed by the art director Aimé Bazin.

== Synopsis ==
The wealthy Etienne de Montenoy invites a number of guests to a family reunion at his chateau. He plans to discard his long-standing mistress Angèle, having fallen in love with Claire, his goddaughter's tutor. However, he fails to wake up one morning and the police detectives believe he has been poisoned.

== Cast ==
- Anne Vernon as Claire Grandjean
- Frank Villard as Etienne Jean Marie de Montenoy
- Dora Doll as Angèle Amélie Jeanne Mersch
- Jacques Castelot as Thierry de Villesec
- Henri Vilbert as Charles Tramillet
- Serge Nadaud as L'inspecteur de police Fiori
- Roland Lesaffre as Raymond Dellez
- Yves Massard as Dr. Delacroix
- Christel Mathieu as Henriette Tramillet
- Ketti Gallian as Cécile de Villesec
- Zina d'Harcourt as Dora Dalba - une strip-teaseuse
- Perrette Souplex as Clotilde
- Isabelle Eber as Simone Tramillet
- Yannick Malloire as Françoise Deschamps
- Robert Seller as Edouard - le valet de chambre
- Gilles Quéant as Le juge
- Bernard Musson as Le notaire
- Albert Michel as Le garde chasse
- Claire Olivier as Rose

== Bibliography ==
- Goble, Alan. The Complete Index to Literary Sources in Film. Walter de Gruyter, 1999.
