= Girl from God's Country =

- Theatrical release poster
- Directed by: Sidney Salkow
- Screenplay by: Malcolm Stuart Boylan; Robert Lee Johnson; Elizabeth Meehan
- Based on: Island Doctor by Ray Millholland
- Produced by: Armand Schaefer
- Starring: Chester Morris; Jane Wyatt; Charles Bickford; Ray Mala; Kate Drain Lawson; John Bleifer
- Cinematography: Jack A. Marta
- Edited by: William Morgan
- Music by: William Lava
- Production company: Republic Pictures
- Distributed by: Republic Pictures
- Release date: July 30, 1940
- Running time: 75 minutes
- Country: United States
- Language: English

Girl from God's Country is a 1940 American drama film directed by Sidney Salkow and written by Malcolm Stuart Boylan, Robert Lee Johnson and Elizabeth Meehan. The film stars Chester Morris, Jane Wyatt, Charles Bickford, Ray Mala, Kate Drain Lawson and John Bleifer. The film was released on July 30, 1940, by Republic Pictures.

== Cast ==
- Chester Morris as Jim Holden aka Dr. Gary Currier
- Jane Wyatt as Anne Webster
- Charles Bickford as Bill Bogler
- Ray Mala as Joe
- Kate Drain Lawson as Koda
- John Bleifer as Ninimook
- Mamo Clark as Mrs. Bearfat Tillicoot
- Ferike Boros as Mrs. Broken Thumb
- Don Zelaya as Tom Broken Thumb
- Clem Bevans as Ben
- Edward Gargan as Poker Player
- Spencer Charters as Dealer
- Thomas E. Jackson as Poker Player
- Victor Potel as Barber
- Si Jenks as Trapper
- Gene Morgan as Man at the dock
