= Green Hell (film) =

1940 film by James Whale

- Theatrical release poster
- Directed by: James Whale
- Written by: Frances Marion
- Produced by: Harry E. Edington
- Starring: Douglas Fairbanks, Jr. Vincent Price; Joan Bennett
- Cinematography: Karl W. Freund
- Edited by: Ted Kent
- Music by: Frank Skinner
- Production company: Famous Films
- Distributed by: Universal Pictures
- Release date: January 26, 1940 (United States)
- Running time: 87 minutes
- Country: United States
- Language: English
- Budget: $692,000

Green Hell is a 1940 American jungle adventure film directed by James Whale, starring Douglas Fairbanks Jr. and Joan Bennett.

Green Hell was given a lavish production by Universal Pictures, which built a massive indoor jungle set on a sound stage. An Inca temple 125 feet high, 225 feet wide, and 45,000 square feet in area was constructed. Having spent a great deal of money on a film that turned out to be a critical and financial disaster, Universal used the set again, recycling it into an Egyptian temple for The Mummy's Hand (1940).

Whale made only one more completed film after this, the 1941 World War II romantic melodrama They Dare Not Love, starring George Brent as an exiled Austrian prince fighting the Nazis.

== Plot ==
A group of adventurers journey deep into the South American jungle in search of ancient Incan treasure. A beautiful woman, brought to their camp by hired bearers, has come to join her husband, a newer member of the group, who was recently killed by hostile natives. As the months pass, jealousies and tempers flare as fights break out over the woman. The Incan treasure is eventually found but the treasure-seekers, now united by a common enemy, are about to be attacked by hordes of fierce natives armed with bows and poisoned arrows.

== Cast ==
- Douglas Fairbanks Jr as Keith Brandon
- Joan Bennett as Stephanie Richardson
- John Howard as Hal Scott
- George Sanders as Forrester
- Alan Hale as Doctor Loren
- George Bancroft 'Tex' Morgan
- Vincent Price as David Richardson
- Gene Garrick as Graham
- Francis McDonald as Gracco
- Ray Mala as Mala (as Ray Mala)
- Peter Bronte as Santos
- Lupita Tovar as Native Girl

== Production ==
The film was based on an original story and script by Frances Marion. Producer Harry Edington had a deal at Universal and announced it for production in April 1939. James Whale agreed to direct and Douglas Fairbanks and Joan Bennett were cast in the leads. At one stage the film was going to be called South of the Amazon.

Price called Whale "a wonderful man" but "in spite of the film's great seriousness of intent it was probably one of the funniest films ever shot anywhere in the world. About five of the worst pictures ever made were all in that one picture. We all adored making it because we realized there wasn't a single word in it that was real. The sets were terribly opulent, very expensive, but it had the most preposterous story."

== Critical reception ==
The New York Times wrote, "every one keeps a stiff upper lip except Miss Bennett, who purses hers, and the youngest member of the expedition, who becomes hysterical and screams, 'Oh, the monotony of it!' Monotony, egad! What a word for the best worst picture of the year!"; while The Radio Times wrote, "famously ludicrous jungle melodrama...Although capably staged in studio sets by James Whale and well enough cast...it is made unendurable by the dialogue and situations devised by former Oscar winner Frances Marion. Vincent Price considered Green Hell the worst film he ever appeared in; he once said, 'About five of the worst pictures ever made are all in this one picture.'"

Leonard Maltin called it "hokey but entertaining."

Douglas Fairbanks Jr said the film was "hell. Every jungle cliche was trotted out. Joanie Bennett says it remains her worst movie. I remember George Sanders saying he held his nose every time he had to say a line... [director James Whale had] just lost it. He didn't care about it at all."

== Preservation ==
A print and its trailer are preserved in the Library of Congress collection, Packard Campus for Audio-Visual Conservation.
