= Last of the Pagans =

1935 film by Richard Thorpe

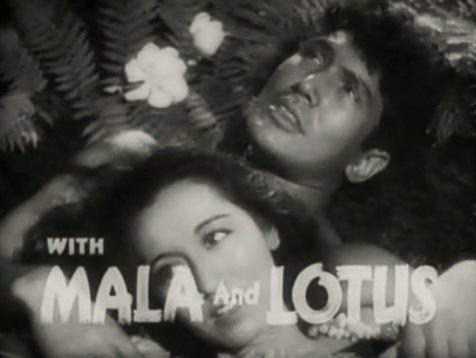
- Ray Mala and Lotus Long
- Directed by: Richard Thorpe
- Screenplay by: John Farrow
- Based on: Typee; 1846 novel by Herman Melville
- Produced by: Phil Goldstone
- Starring: Ray Mala; Lotus Long
- Cinematography: Clyde De Vinna
- Edited by: Martin G. Cohn
- Music by: Nat W. Finston
- Production company: Metro-Goldwyn-Mayer
- Distributed by: Loew's, Inc.
- Release date: December 20, 1935
- Running time: 70 minutes
- Country: United States
- Language: Tahitian/English

Last of the Pagans is a 1935 MGM film based on the Herman Melville novel Typee (1846).

The film was shot on location in Tahiti.

== Plot summary ==
Taro is a native of the island of Tofua who kidnaps a wife named Lilleo from the neighbouring island while bride hunting. At first, she greatly dislikes him but comes to love him. During a feast, an American schooner arrives at the island and offers liquor and trinkets, such as pocket watches to the natives if they sign a form they can not read, which forces them to work in terrible conditions in the phosphate mine on the island of Patua for the Olympic Mining Company. Due to the schooner's deception, a major conflict arose between the islanders and the Westerners, making Taro stand up against the intruders, but is forcibly taken to work in the mines, and Lilleo is taken back to Tofua to marry the chieftain. During a mine collapse, Taro risks his life to save his supervisor, which greatly impresses his captors. They agree to bring him Lilleo but change their mind when they learn she is the chieftain's bride. Disheartened, Lilleo sneaks aboard the schooner to Patua without their permission. They find out and lock her in a cabin, but she escapes to meet Taro. They bring her back to the schooner, and Taro follows suit but is imprisoned by the French authorities in a dilapidated prison. During a hurricane, the prison roof flies off, and Taro escapes to the schooner, which is abandoned by all except Lilleo. He saves her, and after the storm clears, they sail for an uninhabited island to start a new life together.

== Cast ==
- Ray Mala as Taro
- Lotus Long as Lilleo
- Rudolph Anders as Superintendent's Assistant
- Chester Gan as Chinese Cook (uncredited)
- Rangapo A. Taipoo as Taro's Mother (uncredited)
- Teio A. Tematua as The Chief (uncredited)
- Charles Trowbridge as Mine Superintendent
