= La Piste du sud =

La piste du sud
- Directed by: Pierre Billon
- Written by: Oscar-Paul Gilbert (novel)
- Starring: Ketti Gallian; Albert Préjean
- Release date: 7 September 1938
- Country: France
- Language: French

La piste du sud (French pronunciation: [la pist dy syd]) is a 1938 French adventure film directed by Pierre Billon.

== Cast ==
- Ketti Gallian - Hélène Marchand
- Albert Préjean - Le lieutenant Naud
- Pierre Renoir - Stolberg
- Jean-Louis Barrault - Olcott
- René Lefèvre - L'instituteur Saillant
- Jacques Baumer - Gomez
- Arthur Devère - Gingembre
- André Fouché - Le sous-lieutenant Beaumont
- Jean Brochard - Adjudant Soulier
- Geymond Vital - Braun
- Jean Témerson - Chailloux
