= Hawk of the Wilderness =

- Original poster for the 4th chapter of the serial
- Directed by: William Witney; John English
- Written by: Barry Shipman; Rex Taylor; Norman S. Hall; Ridgeway Callow; Sol Shor; William L. Chester (novel)
- Produced by: Robert M. Beche
- Starring: Herman Brix; Ray Mala; Monte Blue; Jill Martin; Noble Johnson; William Royle; Tom Chatterton
- Cinematography: William Nobles; Edgar Lyons
- Edited by: Edward Todd; Helene Turner
- Music by: William Lava
- Distributed by: Republic Pictures
- Release dates: December 3, 1938 (serial); 1950 (TV series); 1966 (film)
- Running time: 12 chapters (213 minutes) (serial); 6 26½-minute episodes (TV series); 100 minutes (TV film)
- Country: United States
- Language: English
- Budget: $117,987 (negative cost: $121,168)

Hawk of the Wilderness (1938) is a Republic movie serial based on the Kioga adventure novels written by pulp writer William L. Chester (1907–1971). Kioga was a Tarzanesque white child raised on a lost island in the Arctic Circle, somewhere in northern Siberia, which was heated by thermal springs and unknown currents. Chester wrote four Kioga novels. The first, Hawk of the Wilderness (1935), was the one that was filmed as the 12-part 1938 Republic serial. (The other novels in the series were Kioga of the Wilderness (1936), One Against a Wilderness (1937) and Kioga of the Unknown Land (1938).

Herman Brix had earlier also played Tarzan on film in the 1935 Edgar Rice Burroughs-produced serial The New Adventures of Tarzan. Hawk of the Wilderness was later re-edited into a feature film version for television as The Lost Island of Kioga in 1966.

== Plot ==
Dr. Lincoln Rand, leading an expedition to an uncharted island in the Arctic Circle that he theorizes may be the ancestral home of all Native Americans, is shipwrecked. The only survivors are Lincoln Rand Jr. (Dr Rand's infant son) and the doctor's servant Mokuyi.

Years later, a message in a bottle from the sinking ship is found, and a second expedition led by a Dr. Munro sets out to find the lost expedition. Part of the crew, led by a smuggler named Solerno, mutinies when they reach the island, abandoning the doctor's expedition. Dr. Munro and company are rescued by Lincoln Rand Jr, now an adult Tarzan-like character known by the name "Kioga, Hawk of the Wilderness", who was raised to manhood on the island by Mokuyi. During the serial's running time, Kioga protects the expedition from both the mutineers and a savage tribe of natives who inhabit the jungle led by a villainous shaman. Meanwhile, the volcano is getting dangerously close to erupting.

== Cast ==
- Herman Brix as Lincoln Rand Jr, (aka Kioga, Hawk of the Wilderness)
- Lane Chandler as Dr. Lincoln Rand Sr. (uncredited)
- Noble Johnson as Mokuyi, Dr. Rand's former servant who rescues the baby Kioga and raises him to adulthood
- Ray Mala as Kias, Kioga's manservant
- Tom Chatterton as Dr. Munro
- Fred Toones (aka "Snowflake") as George (Dr. Munro's Negro servant)
- Jill Martin (aka Harley Wood) as Beth, Dr. Munro's attractive daughter/ love interest for Kioga
- Monte Blue as Yellow Weasel, a villainous native shaman opposed to Kioga and the Munro expedition
- George Eldredge as Allen Kendall, a member of Dr Munro's expedition
- Patrick J. Kelly as William 'Bill-Bill' Williams, another member of Dr Munro's expedition
- William Royle as Manuel Solerno, the smuggler
- Dick Wessel as Dirk, Solerno's henchman
- Tuffie as Tawnee (the dog)
- James Dime as Dark Cloud

== Production ==
Hawk of the Wilderness was filmed between 18 September and 13 October 1938, with location filming in Mammoth Lakes, California. The serial was budgeted for $117,987 but the final negative cost rose slightly to $121,168.

Tuffie was cast when his trainer, during the interview, said "Tuffie, it's dark in here. Turn on the light." Tuffie did so by finding the switch, pulling a chair across to reach it and flipping the switch with his paw.

Silent parts of the serial were filmed with a one-inch lens. Cameraman Edgar Lyons had initially been filming more of the clouds in the sky than the actors, with the effect of partially cutting them out of the shot. The studio complained. Director William Witney compromised with the use of the wider lens, which would take in both cloudscape and actors. Only silent scenes were shot in this manner because the camera would be both closer to the actors and take in more of the surroundings, preventing the microphone from getting close enough to work properly.

=== Special Effects ===
The special effects in this serial were created by the Lydecker brothers.

=== Stunts ===
- Ted Mapes as Kioga (doubling Herman Brix)
- James Dime
- George Montgomery
- Henry Wills

== Release ==
=== Theatrical ===
Hawk of the Wilderness' official release date is 3 December 1938, although this is actually the date the sixth chapter was made available to film exchanges.

=== Television ===
In the early 1950s, Hawk of the Wilderness was one of fourteen Republic serials edited into six 26½-minute episodes each for television syndication.

It was also one of twenty-six Republic serials edited into a feature film for television syndication in 1966. The title of the film was changed to Lost Island of Kioga (cut to 100 minutes in length.)

== Critical reception ==
The burial of Kioga's servant Kias in the final chapter is regarded by historian William C. Cline as one of the "very few successful attempts at drama in serials."

== Chapter titles ==
1. Mysterious Island (28min 59s)
2. Flaming Death (16min 40s)
3. Tiger Trap (16min 46s)
4. Queen's Ransom (16min 50s)
5. Pendulum of Doom (16min 35s)
6. The Dead Fall (16min 40s)
7. White Man's Magic (16min 41s)
8. Ambushed (16min 41s)
9. Marooned (16min 41s) - a re-cap chapter
10. Caves of Horror (16min 39s)
11. Valley of Skulls (16min 41s)
12. Trail's End (16min 40s)

_{Source:}

Preceded by Dick Tracy Returns (1938)	Republic Serial; Hawk of the Wilderness (1939)	Succeeded by The Lone Ranger Rides Again (1939)
Preceded by Dick Tracy Returns (1938)	Witney-English Serial; Hawk of the Wilderness (1939)	Succeeded by The Lone Ranger Rides Again (1939)
