= Ketti Gallian =

French actress (1912–1972)

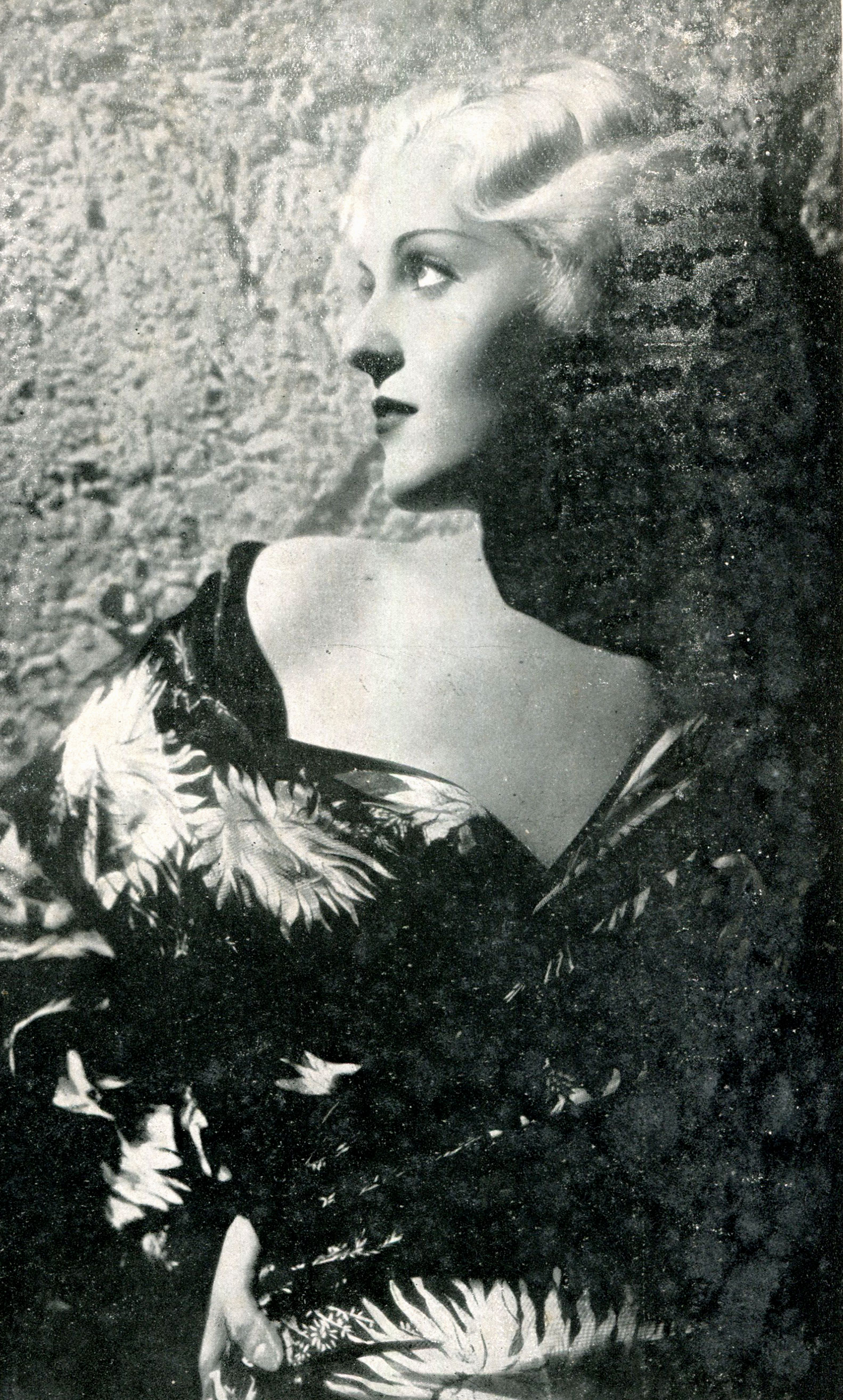
- Gallian in 1933
- Born: Victorine Catherine Galliano; 25 December 1912; Nice, Alpes-Maritimes, France
- Died: 31 October 1972 (aged 59); 16th arrondissement of Paris, France
- Occupation: Actress
- Years active: 1931–1956
- Spouse(s): Pierre Billon (m. 19??)

Ketti Gallian (25 December 1912 – October 1972) was a French actress.

== Early life ==
Gallian was born in Nice.

== Career ==
She went to Paris at the age of 15 and secured work as a model. She later went back to Nice and appeared in a number of foreign films made by Paramount.

Her performance in The Ace, in which she played opposite Raymond Massey on the London stage, resulted in a screen contract from Fox. However, she never became a success while acting in America and returned to France.

== Personal life ==
Gallian had an affair with gangster Bugsy Siegel.

Gallian married Pierre Billon. She died, aged 59, in Paris.

== Filmography ==
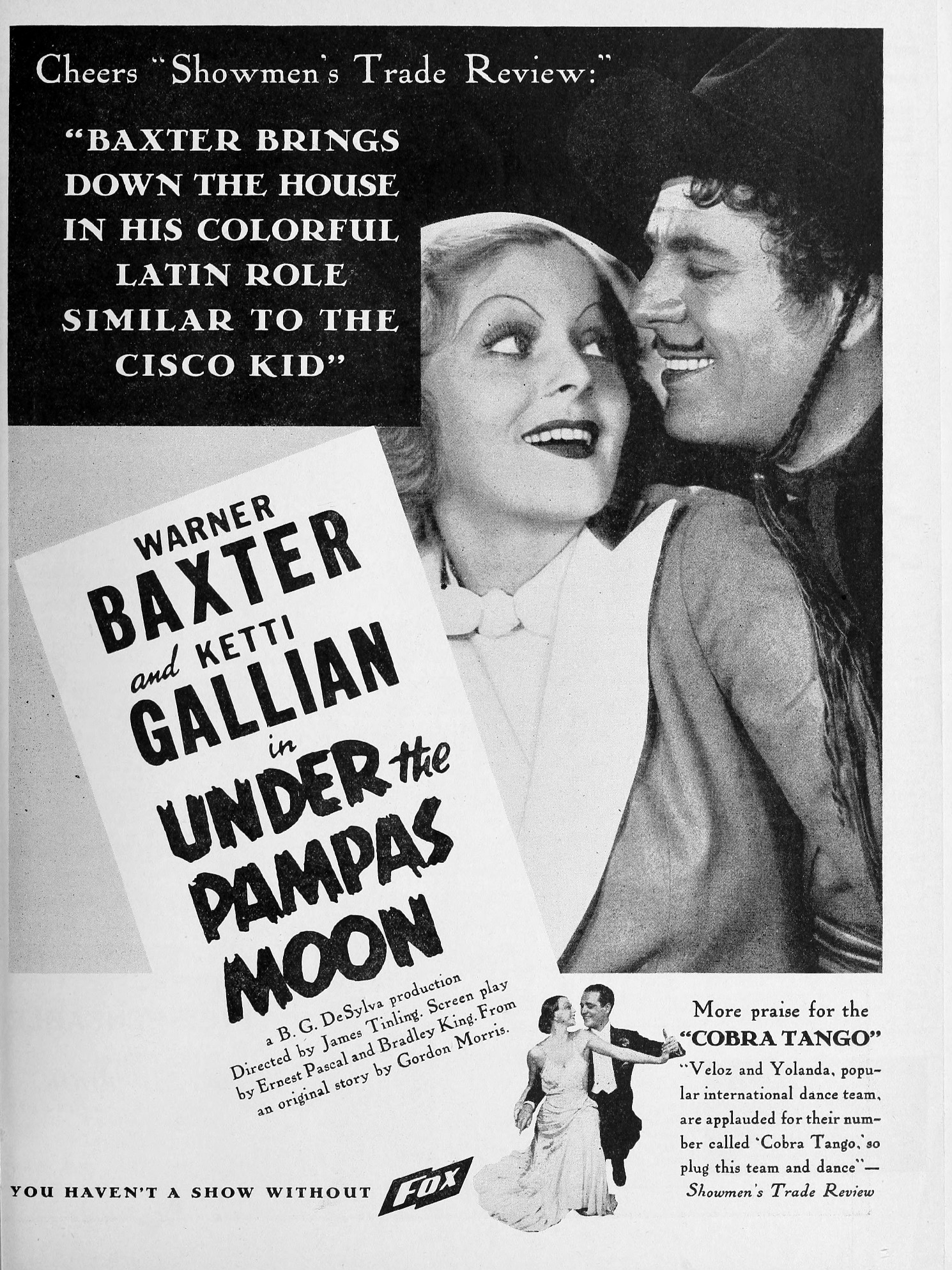
Under the Pampas Moon trade ad 1935 with Warner Baxter

| Year | Title | Role | Notes |
|---|---|---|---|
| 1932 | With Assurance | | |
| 1932 | Côte d'Azur | Yvonne Casin | |
| 1934 | George White's Scandals | Dancer | Uncredited |
| 1934 | Marie Galante | Marie Galante | |
| 1935 | Under the Pampas Moon | Yvonne LaMarr | |
| 1937 | Espionage | Sonia Yaloniv | |
| 1937 | Shall We Dance | Lady Tarrington | |
| 1937 | Aloha, le chant des îles | Maoupiti | |
| 1938 | La Piste du sud | Hélène Marchand | |
| 1945 | Mademoiselle X | Catherine Nanteuil | |
| 1949 | Du Guesclin | Jeanne de Malemains | |
| 1950 | Agnes of Nothing | Alix | |
| 1956 | Suspicion | Cécile de Villesec | (final film role) |
