= Savage Fury =

- cover art of Savage Fury, released by Video Exclusives
- Directed by: Mark Carriere
- Written by: Tina Marie & Mark Carriere
- Screenplay by: Tina Marie
- Produced by: Mark Carriere
- Starring: April Maye; Peter North; Bunny Bleu; Rick Savage; Beverly Bliss; Tony Martino; Craig Roberts; David Sanders; Christy Canyon; Josephine Carrington
- Cinematography: Mark Carriere
- Edited by: Alexander Nevsky
- Music by: Igor
- Distributed by: Video Exclusives
- Release date: 1985 (United States)
- Running time: 87 minutes
- Country: United States
- Language: English

Savage Fury is a 1985 pornographic thriller written and directed by Mark Carriere and co-written by Tina Marie. It was followed by Savage Fury 2 in 1989 and Savage Fury 3 in 1994.

== Plot ==
Outside a pizzeria, a trio of ne'er-do-wells sexually harass three female college students, prompting one of the young women to slap and shove the men's leader, Clint, who threatens to get even. That night, the three thugs, with the help of two other toughs, break into the girls' dormitory at the Central State University. The quintet rape the five women inside, and, afterward, one of the victims vows: "You mark my words, I'll get you in the end!" A year later, one of the women spots four of the five rapists at a bar, so she gets in touch with the other victims, and, together, they plot to get revenge on their assailants.

The women split up and pose as prostitutes, with each seducing one of the rapists and luring them to a secluded area. The women have sex with the men, and, when they finish, they remind them of the events of the previous year, before gunning them down with automatic firearms.

== Cast ==
- Christy Canyon as Sandra Davis
- Craig Roberts as Rapist
- April Maye as Tammy
- Bunny Bleu as Lenore
- Josephine Carrington as Janie
- Beverly Bliss as Sondra
- David Sanders as Rapist
- Rick Savage as Clint
- Peter North as Rapist
- Tony Martino as Rapist

== Reception ==
Adam Film World gave Savage Fury a 3.5 out of 5 ("Hot") while Hustler Erotic Video gave it a 3/4. AVN's Alvin Zbryski awarded a 3 1/2 out of a possible 5 and wrote, "Stylish, moody, loaded with glistening sex and ultimately, extremely disturbing, Savage Fury takes a standard exploitation film theme, rape and revenge, and brings it to new sexual and violent heights".
