= Conrad A. Nervig =

American film editor

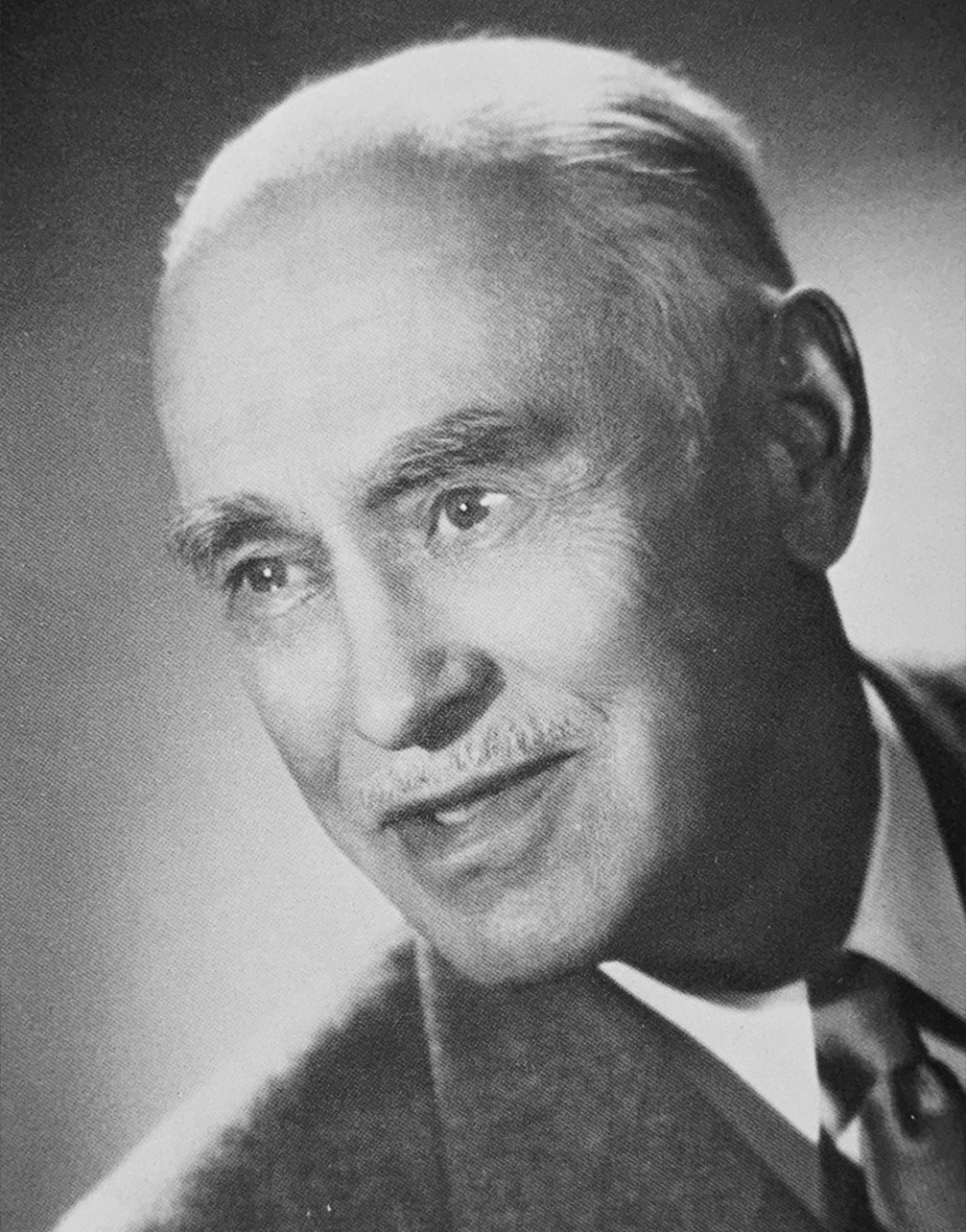
- Publicity headshot of Nervig
- Born: June 24, 1889; Grant County, Dakota Territory, U.S.
- Died: November 26, 1980 (aged 91); Escondido, California, U.S.
- Occupation: Film editor
- Spouses: Elizabeth Alder (m. 1916; died 1951) Ann Griffin (m. 1961; died 1980)

Conrad Albinus Nervig (June 24, 1889 – November 26, 1980) was an American film editor with 81 film credits.

During World War I, he served as a lieutenant (junior grade) and was an officer aboard USS Cyclops before it disappeared. Immediately after retiring from the Navy in 1922, Nervig began work at Goldwyn Pictures as a film lab assistant, and remained with the studio after its merger to form Metro-Goldwyn-Mayer (MGM) in 1924. He spent essentially his entire career at MGM, retiring from the studio in 1954; he edited one final film for RKO Pictures in 1956.

Nervig was the first recipient of the Academy Award for Film Editing for the film Eskimo (1933). He won a second Oscar (shared with Ralph E. Winters) for the film King Solomon's Mines (1950). He was also nominated for his work on A Tale of Two Cities (1935).

After his retirement, he frequently talked about his experiences aboard Cyclops before its disappearance. These include "The Cyclops Mystery", an article published in 1969 by the US Naval Institute, as well as the 1971 documentary film, "The Devil's Triangle". Before his death, he remained as a life member of American Cinema Editors.

== Personal life ==
Nervig was married twice. His first wife, Elizabeth Alder, died on September 8, 1951. On August 18, 1961, he married his second wife Ann Griffin in Las Vegas, Nevada. Ann Griffin was the owner of the Ramona Sentinel newspaper. He also has a daughter. Nervig died at Palomar Memorial Hospital in Escondido, California on November 26, 1980. His ashes were scattered at sea.

== Filmography ==
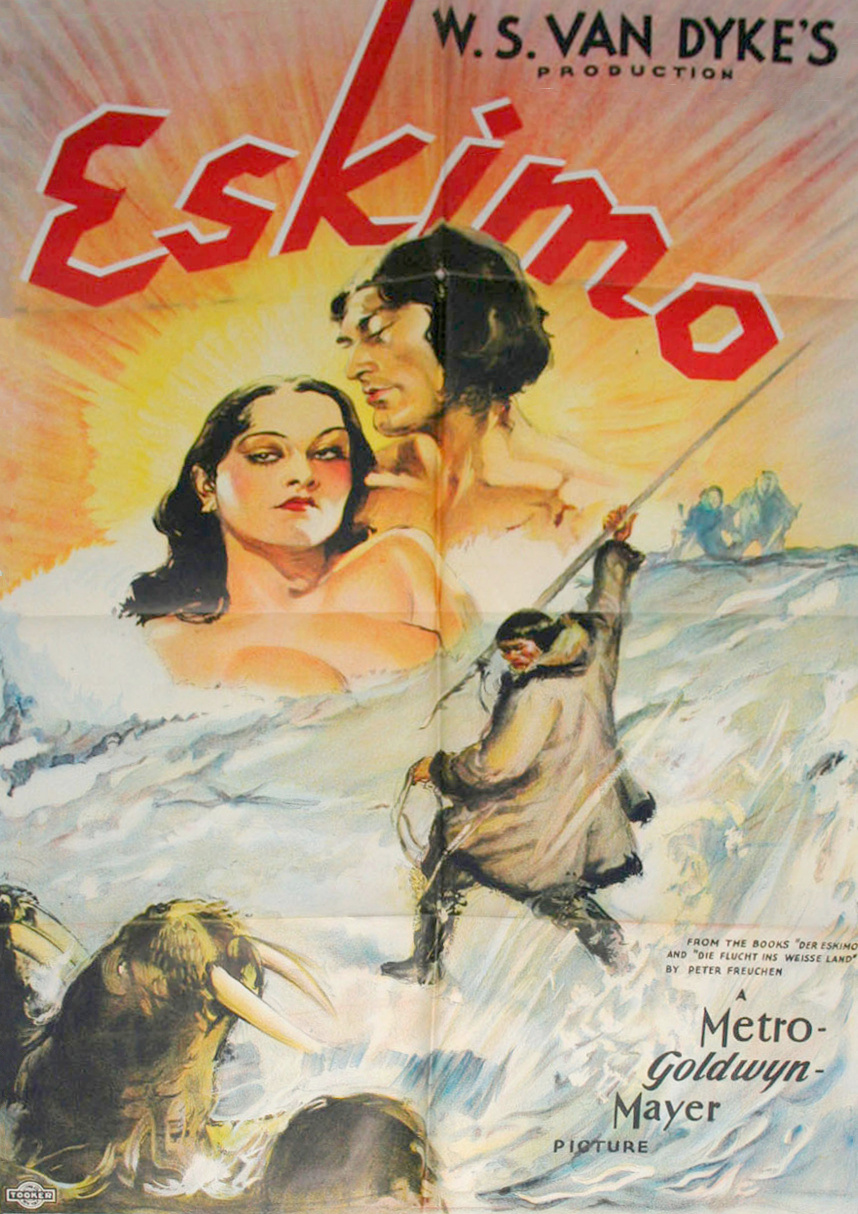
Poster for the 1933 film Eskimo for which Nervig won the 1934 Academy Award for film editing

- Winners of the Wilderness (1927)
- Rookies (1927)
- The Fair Co-Ed (1927)
- The Divine Woman (1928)
- The Actress (1928)
- The Masks of the Devil (1928)
- The Wind (1928)
- Wild Orchids (1929)
- The Idle Rich (1929)
- The Last of Mrs. Cheyney (1929)
- Devil-May-Care (1929)
- Die Sehnsucht Jeder Frau (1930) (Note: German version of A Lady to Love with a different cast. Nervig also edited the original film.)
- A Lady to Love (1930)
- Call of the Flesh (1930)
- Passion Flower (1930)
- Le procès de Mary Dugan (1931) (Note: French version of The Trial of Mary Dugan with a different cast. The original film was edited by Blanche Sewell.)
- Buster se marie (1931)
- Inspiration (1931)
- Son of India (1931)
- The Guardsman (1931)
- Private Lives (1931)
- Letty Lynton (1932)
- Downstairs (1932)
- Kongo (1932)
- The Women in His Life (1933)
- Eskimo (1934)
- Paris Interlude (1934)
- The Night Is Young (1935)
- The Casino Murder Case (1935)
- Murder in the Fleet (1935)
- Calm Yourself (1935)
- A Tale of Two Cities (1935)
- Exclusive Story (1936)
- Absolute Quiet (1936)
- Women Are Trouble (1936)
- His Brother's Wife (1936)
- Maytime (1937)
- The Emperor's Candlesticks (1937)
- Live, Love and Learn (1937)
- Beg, Borrow or Steal (1937)
- Love Is a Headache (1938)
- The First Hundred Years (1938)
- The Crowd Roars (1938)
- Spring Madness (1938)
- Honolulu (1939)
- Sergeant Madden (1939)
- 6,000 Enemies (1939)
- Henry Goes Arizona (1939)
- Northwest Passage (1940)
- The Man from Dakota (1940)
- And One Was Beautiful (1940)
- Phantom Raiders (1940)
- The Golden Fleecing (1940)
- Hullabaloo (1940)
- The Bad Man (1941)
- The Big Store (1941)
- Dr. Kildare's Wedding Day (1941)
- The Omaha Trail (1942)
- I Married an Angel (1942)
- Kathleen (1942)
- Grand Central Murder (1942)
- The Human Comedy (1943)
- An American Romance (1944)
- Nothing but Trouble (1945)
- Courage of Lassie (1946)
- No Leave, No Love (1946)
- High Barbaree (1947)
- High Wall (1948)
- Act of Violence (1949)
- Border Incident (1949)
- Side Street (1949)
- Devil's Doorway (1950)
- King Solomon's Mines (1950)
- Vengeance Valley (1951)
- Too Young to Kiss(1951)
- The Merry Widow (1952)
- The Bad and the Beautiful (1953)
- The Affairs of Dobie Gillis (1953)
- Gypsy Colt (1954)
- Death of a Scoundrel (1956)

== Awards and nominations ==
Year of ceremony	Ceremony	Award	Nominated work	Result	Ref.
1935	7th Academy Awards	Best Film Editing	Eskimo	Won	
1936	9th Academy Awards	Best Film Editing	A Tale of Two Cities	Nominated	
1951	23rd Academy Awards	Best Film Editing	King Solomon's Mines	Won	
