= Marie Galante (film) =

1934 film directed by Henry King

- DVD cover
- Directed by: Henry King
- Written by: Jacques Deval (novel); Reginald Berkeley (screenplay); Dudley Nichols (uncredited)
- Produced by: Winfield R. Sheehan (producer)
- Starring: See below
- Cinematography: John F. Seitz
- Edited by: Harold D. Schuster
- Music by: Arthur Lange
- Distributed by: Fox Film Corporation
- Release date: October 26, 1934
- Running time: 88 minutes
- Country: United States
- Languages: French, English

Marie Galante is a 1934 American film directed by Henry King, starring Ketti Gallian and Spencer Tracy, adapted from a French novel by Jacques Deval. Later the same year, the novel was adapted into a French musical titled Marie Galante, with book and lyrics by Jacques Deval and music by Kurt Weill.

The synopsis of the musical play, as described by the Kurt Weill Foundation, is as follows: "Marie is kidnapped and taken to Panama by a lecherous sea captain, who abandons her when she will not give in to his desires. She becomes a prostitute in order to earn money to return to France; meanwhile, she is unwittingly involved in an espionage plot. She spends most of her money to care for a dying black man whom no one else will tend to. When she does finally save enough money for a steamer fare, she is murdered by a spy who fears discovery the night before the boat sails." In the film, Marie remains an innocent, and one of the heroes is a Japanese General.

== Plot ==
Marie is a telegraph messenger who loves the provincial French port that is her home. She delivers a telegram to a captain in the local cafe. It describes the route he is to take. They return to his ship, the Hettie King, so he can compose a reply. The next morning, the captain berates a crewman for departing while the girl was onboard. Their business is illegal, so they drop her off at "a seacoast town in Central America", where Marie learns that she must get to the Panama Canal to get a ship to France.

In the office of the Governor of the Panama Canal Zone, General Philips, his aide, Ellsworth, and British agent, Ratcliff, discuss Philips's "gallery of suspicious characters", including retired Japanese General Tenoki, who owns a curio shop. Ratcliff anticipates an attempt on the Canal by the notorious spy, saboteur and fomenter of wars, Ryner, a master of disguises who kills his female accomplices. Enter tropical disease specialist, Dr. Crawbett, who promises Ratcliff a fine time at the Pacific Gardens café.

At the Pacific Gardens, Marie makes her first appearance, entrancing all the men. Tapia advises Marie that she will get a cut if she drinks with the customers, and orders "a special", orange juice and water. Eager to get home, Marie orders several drinks in rapid succession, amusing Crawbett. She is ecstatic when she learns that Bogard owns the Parisian Bazaar. Assuming that he is French and will help her, she goes to his shop. He is not French, but he tells her that she can come to the shop and look at pictures of France, and adds that she may be able to help him.

At the cabaret, Crawbett speaks to Plosser with authority, giving him orders and receiving reports about other characters' movements. Offscreen, Marie tells him what happened to her; he believes her.

Tenoki's clerk is mysteriously murdered. Brogard tells Marie to find out about the comings and goings of the American officers, so he can stock his shop appropriately.

Crawbett reveals himself as an agent when he calls the Bureau of Investigation in Washington, D.C. Tenoki brings Marie to his home. Plosser and Crawbett see her there and assume the worst. Tenoki asks her to reveal Brogard's secrets, but she knows none, so he sends her home. Crawbett confronts her with his suspicions. She walks away to church. He sees her kneeling before the Madonna and apologizes. She promises not to see these men, and goes to the French consul, who will not help.

Crawbett and Ratcliff meet with the governor. A telegram arrives identifying Marie as a stowaway, marking her as a liar and a dangerous woman. The Hettie King arrives at that moment. Crawbett and Plosser interview the captain and the suspiciously large crew. Asked about the stowaway, they say that she escaped in Yucatán.

Marie refuses Brogard's "commission", and gives Crawbett the original telegram that she delivered to the captain. It is signed "Ryner". Ratcliff suspects that Tenoki is Ryner. Meanwhile, men from the Hettie King assemble at Brogard's shop to go on a sightseeing tour of the locks and the powerhouse.

At the Pacific Gardens, Crawbett tells Marie that he cannot send her home yet. He needs to know about these men. She cannot understand what is at stake; she wants to go home.

Brogard discusses the sabotage plot with his men. Crawbett and Ratcliff find dynamite in the dredges near the powerhouse. Crawbett brings Tenoki to the dredge pit and finds Ratcliff dead and the boxes gone. At the powerhouse, Brogard, disguised as the foreman, receives them.

Tenoki turns out to be a good guy, a Japanese spy looking for Ryner, who threatens peace among nations. Crawbett finds Brogard's dead body, with the mustache missing: It is the powerhouse foreman. At the powerhouse, Crawbett sits chatting with the supposed foreman, delaying Brogard's and Ryner's escapes. Fleeing, Ryner shoots Marie.

The American fleet safely steams through the locks. In the hospital, Plosser and Tenoki bring roses to Marie, who no longer wants to go home. She wants to be with her two best friends.

They are going to Paris.

== Cast ==
- Spencer Tracy as Dr. Crawbett, an American tropical disease specialist.
- Ketti Gallian as Marie Galante
- Ned Sparks as Plosser, curmudgeonly owner of the Pacific Gardens cabaret
- Helen Morgan as Tapia, a singer at the Pacific Gardens
- Sig Ruman as Brogard, owner of the Parisian Bazaar. He speaks with a German accent.
- Leslie Fenton as General Saki Tenoki, retired from the Japanese Navy, dealer in curios
- Arthur Byron as Panama Canal Zone Governor General Gerald Phillips
- Robert Loraine as Ratcliff, a British agent
- Frank Darien as Ellsworth, on Phillips's staff
- Stepin Fetchit as a waiter at the Pacific Gardens
- Jay C. Flippen as a Sailor in a Bar

== Production ==
According to the AFI Catalog, legal records reveal that after the American release of the film, "Jacques Deval, author of the novel, served notice on Fox's Paris office that the studio must not use his name in connection with the film on the ground that the story has been 'so thoroughly mutilated and changed that it is not his work'. Deval threatened to institute an injunction if the studio insisted on using his name." The film credits do cite Deval as the source of the story.

== Soundtrack ==
- "Serves Me Right for Treating You Wrong" - performed by Helen Morgan (Music and lyrics by Maurice Sigler, Al Goodhart and Al Hoffman)
- "Song of a Dreamer" (Music by Jay Gorney, lyrics by Don Hartman)
- "Un Peu Beaucoup" (Music by Arthur Lange, lyrics by Marcel Silver)
- "Shim Shammy" (Music and lyrics by Stepin Fetchit)
- "It's Home" (Music by Jay Gorney, lyrics by Jack Yellen)
- "On a Little Side Street" (Music by Harry Akst, lyrics by Bernie Grossman)
- "Je t'adore" (Music by Harry Akst, lyrics by Bernie Grossman)

== Reception ==
The New York Times's Andre Sennwald admired Ketti Gallian:

Frail, lovely and very quietly over-whelming...a striking addition to the screen's gallery of high-powered ladies. The work in which she appears is an ambitious and interesting story of international intrigue which is better in intention than in actual achievement... (It) tells the strange tale of a stranded French girl who becomes the innocent central figure in a whirling confusion of sabotage and counter-espionage in the Panama Canal Zone. M. Deval's crimson heroine has become a virtuous and extraordinarily naïve girl in the film. Unintentionally shanghaied out of her French seacoast village by a drunken captain of a tramp steamer, Marie finds herself penniless and puzzled in a strange land. Fleeing the ship at Yucatan, she makes her way to the Canal Zone, hoping to find passage back to her native land. Her fantastic and pitiful story meets lifted eyebrows everywhere. To support herself she becomes a singer in a night club which is frequented by mysterious and sinister gentlemen of foreign tongue. Ingenuously she becomes involved with several international plotters, who promise to obtain homeward passage for her in return for certain information about the movements of the American fleet. An American agent (Tracy) who believes her story finally manages to expose a plot to blow up a power plant and disable the fleet. In conception and occasionally in execution this is an arresting melodrama, with a fresh and vivid approach to the materials of espionage. Unfortunately it suffers from several major flaws, which force the photoplay steadily into mediocrity after a fine beginning... Marie Galante asks its audiences to believe that a girl of presumably average intelligence can be the unwitting dupe of various rogues without once suspecting their intentions.
