= Beyond Bengal =

- Directed by: Harry Schenck
- Written by: Harry Schenck (story)
- Produced by: Harry Schenck
- Starring: See below
- Release date: April 25, 1934
- Running time: 62 minutes
- Country: United States
- Language: English

Beyond Bengal is a 1934 American film directed by Harry Schenck.

The film is also known as Bengal, Harry Schenck's Beyond in the United States (complete title).

== Plot ==
The record of an expedition deep into the Malayan jungle.

- Harry Schenck as Harry Scheneck
- Joan Baldwin as Joan
- John Martin as John Martin, Narrator
- Capt. Nain Sei as Captain Nain Sei
- Ali as Ali
- Bee as Bee
- Sultan Iskandar Shah as The Sultan of Perak
