= Robinson Crusoe of Clipper Island =

- Directed by: Ray Taylor; Mack V. Wright
- Written by: Morgan Cox; Maurice Geraghty; Barry Shipman
- Produced by: Nat Levine; Sol C. Siegel
- Starring: Ray Mala; Mamo Clark; Herbert Rawlinson; William Newell; John Ward; John Dilson; Selmer Jackson; John Picorri
- Cinematography: Edgar Lyons; William Nobles
- Edited by: Helene Turner; William Witney
- Music by: Hugo Riesenfeld
- Distributed by: Republic Pictures
- Release date: November 14, 1936 (serial)
- Running time: 14 chapters (256 minutes) (serial); 71 minutes (feature); 6 26½-minute episodes (TV); 100 minutes (TV movie)
- Country: United States
- Language: English
- Budget: $106,779 (negative cost: $111,848)

Robinson Crusoe of Clipper Island, Chapter 1: The Mysterious Island

Robinson Crusoe of Clipper Island (1936) is a Republic movie serial starring Ray Mala. It was the fourth of the 66 serials produced by Republic and the last (of four) to be released in 1936. Robinson Crusoe of Clipper Island is notable for being the first Republic serial to contain another common aspect of serials—a Re-Cap Chapter, similar to a clipshow in modern television, whereby the events of the previous chapters are repeated via clips (in order to save money). Contrary to popular belief, this was not the invention of the concept, which had been routinely used in serial production before the release of this serial. The serial was edited into the film Robinson Crusoe of Mystery Island, which was released in 1966.

== Plot ==
Agent Mala, an intelligence operative, investigates sabotage on the remote Clipper Island. A gang of spies causes the eruption of a volcano, for which Mala is blamed. He convinces the native Princess Melani of his innocence and helps her ward off a takeover by rival high priest and spy collaborator Porotu and discover the identity of spy ringleader H.K.

== Cast ==
- Ray Mala as Mala, operative of the United States Intelligence Department undercover as a Pacific Dirigible Airlines radio operator. Mala was a rare non-Caucasian hero in serials.
- Rex the Wonder Horse
- Buck the Dog
- Mamo Clark as Princess Melani, princess and ruler of the Komatoans
- Herbert Rawlinson as Grant Jackson
- William Newell as Hank McGlaurie, Agent Mala's partner
- John Ward as Anthony Tupper, British Novelist accompanying Agent Mala
- John Dilson as E. G. Ellsworth, joint owner of Pacific Dirigible Airlines
- Selmer Jackson as Canfield, joint owner of Pacific Dirigible Airlines, alias H.K
- Tiny Roebuck as Eppa - the Wrestler.

== Production ==
The serial was budgeted at $106,779 although the final negative cost was $111,848 (a $5,069, or 4.7%, overspend). It was filmed between August 31 and September 25, 1936, under the working title Robinson Crusoe. The serial's production number was 419. This serial has very little to do with Robinson Crusoe.

=== Special effects ===
The special effects were created by John T. Coyle and the Lydecker brothers.

== Chapter titles ==
Robinson Crusoe of Clipper Island is the only 14-chapter sound serial.

1. The Mysterious Island (31 min 21s)
2. Flaming Danger (20 min 46s)
3. Fathoms Below (18 min 03s)
4. Into the Enemy's Camp (17 min 27s)
5. Danger in the Air (17 min 41s)
6. The God of the Volcano (17 min 19s)
7. Trail's End (15 min 41s)
8. The Jaws of the Beast (16 min 17s)
9. The Cave of the Winds (17 min 22s)
10. Wings of Fury (16 min 29s)
11. Agents of Disaster (16 min 22s) -- Re-Cap Chapter
12. The Sea Trap (16 min 41s)
13. Mutiny (18 min 35s)
14. Thunder Mountain (16 min 21s)

_{Source:}

== Cliffhangers ==
1. The burning mainmast of the Tuloa falls on Mala.
2. Mala is captured by natives and forced to fall into a volcano.
3. While diving, and with the ship above being shelled by a submarine, Mala begins to suffocate.
4. Mala and Lamar are caught in the explosion of an overheated boiler.
5. The plane carrying Mala crashes into the Pacific Ocean.
6. Mala and Melani are caught in a landslide caused by an earthquake.
7. While escaping from aggressive natives, Mala and Melani slip off a cliff.
8. With his vine cut, Mala falls into alligator-infested water.
9. While scaling a cliff, Mala is shot at and falls.
10. Struggling with the pilot of a biplane causes it to crash into the Pacific Ocean.
11. Mala's car is forced off the road and over an embankment.
12. Mala and Melani, escaping in a motorboat, are shot at by a cannon.
13. Mala is caught by gas aboard an airship, which begins to crash.

Note: Many of the resolutions of these cliffhangers are "cheats": When the event is repeated at the start of a new chapter, there is a crucial and sometimes obvious difference from what was shown at the end of the preceding chapter.

== See also ==
- List of film serials
- List of film serials by studio
- List of films in the public domain in the United States
