= Pierre Billon (director) =

French film director and screenwriter (1901–1981)

- Born: 7 February 1901; Saint-Hippolyte-du-Fort, France
- Died: 31 August 1981 (aged 80); Paris, France
- Occupations: film director and screenwriter
- Years active: 1931–1957
- Known for: served on the jury of the Cannes Festival (1952)
- Notable work: see Selected filmography
- Spouse: Ketti Gallian

Pierre Billon (Saint-Hippolyte-du-Fort, 7 February 1901 – Paris, 31 August 1981) was a French film director and screenwriter. In 1952 he served on the jury of the Cannes Festival.

== Selected filmography ==
- Venetian Nights (1931)
- The House on the Dune (1934)
- The Fakir of the Grand Hotel (1934)
- Bourrasque (1935)
- Second Bureau (1935)
- In the Service of the Tsar (1936)
- Southern Mail (1937)
- The Silent Battle (1937)
- The Inevitable Monsieur Dubois (1943)
- Vautrin (1943)
- Mademoiselle X (1945)
- The Eternal Husband (1946)
- Ruy Blas (1948)
- Agnes of Nothing (1950)
- Chéri (1950)
- Farewell Mister Grock (1950)
- My Friend Oscar (1951)
- My Seal and Them (1951)
- The Merchant of Venice (1953)
- Storm (1954)
- Suspicion (1956)
- Until the Last One (1957)
