= Lotus Long =

Asian-American actress (1909–1990)

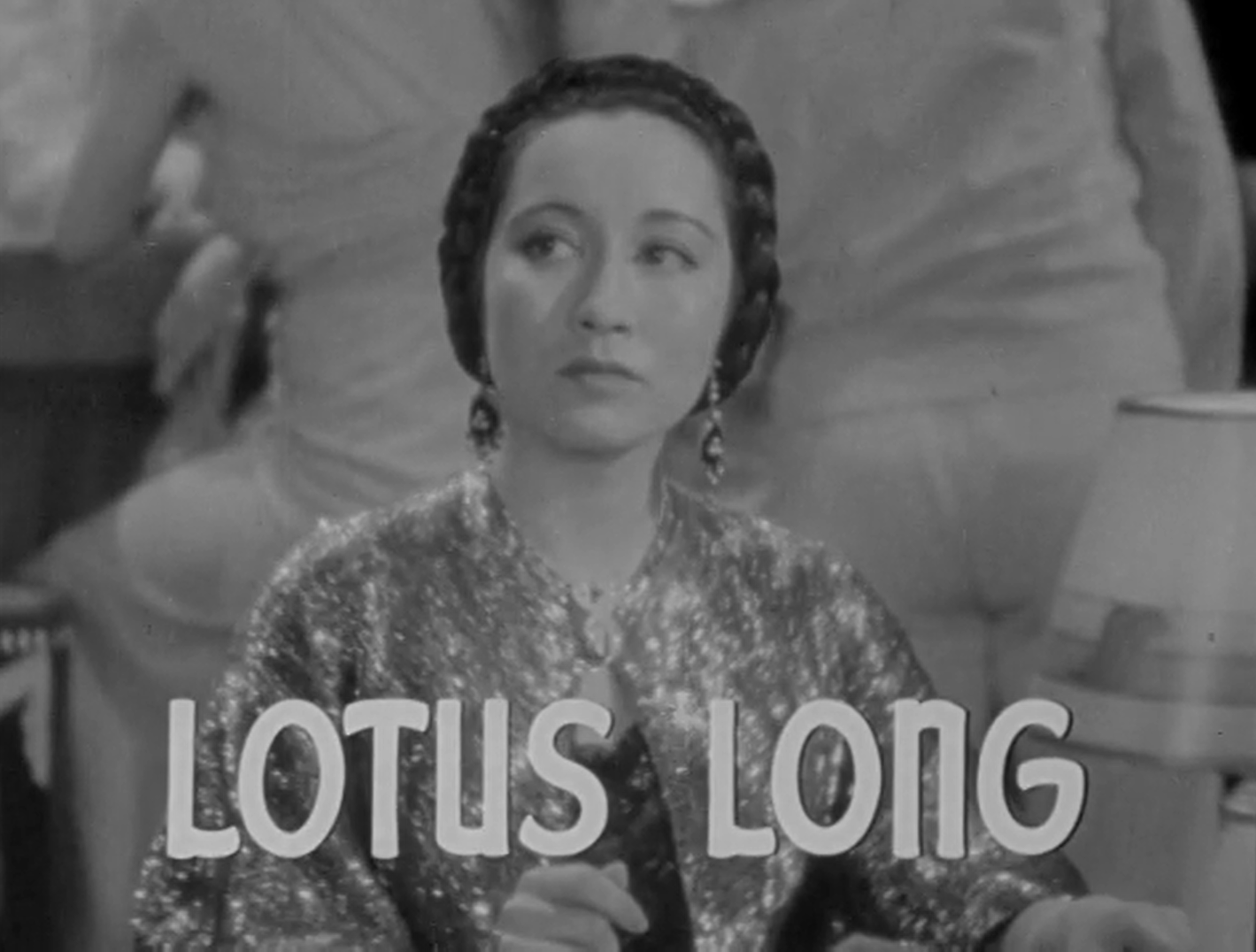
- Trailer for Think Fast, Mr. Moto (1937)
- Born: Lotus Pearl Shibata; July 18, 1909; New Jersey, U.S.
- Died: September 14, 1990 (aged 81)
- Other name: Karen Sorrell
- Occupations: Actor; Writer; producer
- Years active: 1929–1956
- Spouse: James Knott (m. 1933; died 1989)

Lotus Long (born Lotus Pearl Shibata, July 18, 1909 – September 14, 1990) was an Asian-American film actress.

== Early life ==
Long was born in New Jersey to Ishiro Shibata and Blanche Leleu. She came to Southern California during the 1920s to act in Hollywood films and usually portrayed ethnic Asian female characters in supporting roles. She used the name Lotus Long for stage and film. Due to her professional surname, people generally assumed that she was of Chinese ancestry. During World War II she used this name to avoid incarceration in American internment camps with other persons of Japanese ancestry, which included both legal permanent residents and American citizens.

== Career ==
She appeared in the MGM docudrama Eskimo (1933) as wife of the main character and under the stage name Lotus Long in the 1934 movie The Mysterious Mr. Wong and 1939's Mr. Wong in Chinatown. She also starred alongside Keye Luke in Phantom of Chinatown as Win Len, Dr. Benton's secretary.

She also was credited under the name Karen Sorrell in the movies Flight into Nowhere (1938), starring Jack Holt and Mysterious Mr. Moto (1938), starring Peter Lorre. She was uncredited in the movie The Real Glory (1939), starring Gary Cooper and David Niven.

One of her more infamous roles was Tokyo Rose in Lew Landers' movie Tokyo Rose (1946), which starred Keye Luke, Edwin Luke, Richard Loo, Byron Barr, and Osa Massen.

Long had a writing and producing credit for the film The Tahitian (1956) made with her husband James Knott. The Tahitian was filmed on location with a largely native cast.

== Legacy ==
She was a pioneer for future Asian-American actresses in film and also a role model.

In Timothy Tau's short-film bio-pic Keye Luke, Lotus Long is portrayed by Mei Melancon.
