= Mildred Boyd =

American actress (1908–1999)

- Mildred Boyd, Los Angeles, 1940s
- Born: October 2, 1908; Kingston, Tennessee, US
- Died: October 22, 1999 (aged 91); Inglewood, California, US
- Occupations: Actress; dancer; singer

Mildred Boyd (1908–1999) was an actress, a singer, and a dancer who was active in Hollywood from the 1920s through the 1950s. Like many Black actresses of her era, she was often cast as a maid or a nurse.

== Biography ==
Boyd was born in Kingston, Tennessee, to Creed Boyd and Rachel Finley. The family moved to Nebraska soon after she was born. Boyd relocated to Los Angeles as a young adult, where she found work a chorus girl at Frank Sebastian's Cotton Club, a popular Black nightclub in Culver City. She was part of a group known as the Creole Cuties.

Around the same time, she began appearing in Hollywood films, working regularly throughout the 1930s and 1940s. She appeared in more than 200 films.

On Broadway, Boyd appeared in The Duchess Misbehaves (1946).

== Selected filmography ==
- Lydia Bailey (1952)
- Skirts Ahoy! (1952)
- The Harlem Globetrotters (1951)
- I Was a Communist for the F.B.I. (1951)
- The Jackie Robinson Story (1950)
- Pinky (1949)
- The Doctor and the Girl (1949)
- No Time for Romance (1948)
- Sun Tan Ranch (1948)
- Force of Evil (1948)
- The Decision of Christopher Blake (1948)
- Out of the Past (1947)
- Variety Girl (1947)
- The Red Dragon (1945)
- I Love a Bandleader (1945)
- Carolina Blues (1944)
- Broadway Rhythm (1944)
- Phantom Lady (1944)
- Thank Your Lucky Stars (1943)
- Lady for a Night (1942)
- Irene (1940)
- Way Down South (1939)
- Double Deal (1938)
- Gang Smashers (1938)
- The Duke Is Tops (1938)
- Spirit of Youth (1938)
- The Singing Kid (1936)
- Strike Me Pink (1936)
- Murder at the Vanities (1934)
- Merrily We Go to Hell (1932)
- Riley the Cop (1928)
- Gentlemen Prefer Blondes (1928)
