= Tudor Owen (actor) =

Welsh actor (1898–1979)

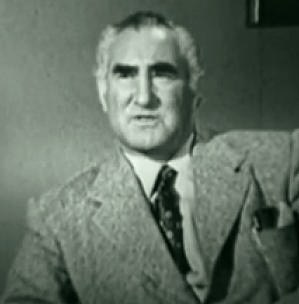
- Owen in Perils of the Jungle (1953)
- Born: Roy Tudor Owen; 20 January 1898; Penarth, Glamorgan, Wales
- Died: 13 March 1979 (aged 81); Los Angeles, California, U.S.
- Occupation: Actor
- Years active: 1926–1965
- Spouse: Gladys Virginia Bennett Paterno (m. 1953)

Roy Tudor Owen (20 January 1898 – 13 March 1979), known professionally as Tudor Owen, was a Welsh character actor. He is known for voicing Towser in the 1961 Disney film One Hundred and One Dalmatians.

== Early life and career ==
He began his career in the 1926 silent film Bride of the Storm as Funeral Harry. His next film role was 22 years later in the 1948 film Up in Central Park.

Owen worked in radio during the 1940s and 1950s, teaming up with producer and director Jack Webb in several programs. The first of those programs was the radio drama Pat Novak, for Hire. He played Novak's drunk ex-doctor friend "Jocko" Madigan. He played this role from 1946 to 1949. He again co-starred with Webb in the radio series Johnny Modero, Pier 23 in 1947. Owen co-starred with Webb on radio one more time, on the radio version of the Pete Kelly franchise. He played Barney Rickett for the series's summer run in 1951. In 1951, he played the title character's editor in Alias Jane Doe. His last radio appearance was in 1953, leaving behind such radio credits as University Theatre, Escape, Suspense, Family Theater, Lux Radio Theatre, Yours Truly, Johnny Dollar, and Crime Classics.

Shortly after Owen's last appearance in radio, he made his first appearance in television on the TV series The Lone Ranger in 1950, as Dusty in "Greed for Gold.. As his presence became increasingly wanted in the television field, his presence became less wanted in the film industry. Although he did find success in film, it was not as much success as in previous years. His most successful film during this time was in the 1961 Disney film One Hundred and One Dalmatians where Owen voiced Towser. His last film role was as a knight in The Sword in the Stone (1963). Some of his other film credits include Montana, The Black Castle, Back to God's Country, Perils of the Jungle, Brigadoon, The Oklahoma Woman, Congo Crossing and Jack the Giant Killer.

Owen's television career expanded during the 1950s and 1960s which included recurring roles in Perry Mason and a starring role in a television series. In 1954–55, Owen co-starred as Joe Ainsley alongside Thomas Mitchell and Kathleen Freeman in the sitcom Mayor of the Town. He played the clan patriarch in "The Annie MacGregor Story" S1 E21 "Wagon Train" 1958. He retired from show business after a 1965 guest appearance on the television series Voyage to the Bottom of the Sea.

== Selected filmography ==
- Bride of the Storm (1926) - Funeral Harry
- Up in Central Park (1948) - Footman (uncredited)
- Fighter Squadron (1948) - Eddie (uncredited)
- Life of St. Paul Series (1949) - Dionides
- Top o' the Morning (1949) - Cormac Gillespie
- Challenge to Lassie (1949) - Doctor (uncredited)
- Port of New York (1949) - Apartment Hotel Janitor (uncredited)
- The Pilgrimage Play (1949) - Nicodemus
- Montana (1950) - Jock
- Outside the Wall (1950) - Watchman (uncredited)
- The Jackpot (1950) - Police Turnkey (uncredited)
- Frenchie (1950) - Toby (uncredited)
- Lorna Doone (1951) - Farmer Snowe (uncredited)
- Thunder on the Hill (1951) - Old Man (uncredited)
- Dick Turpin's Ride (1951) - Mason (uncredited)
- Angels in the Outfield (1951) - Father O'Houlihan (uncredited)
- The Sea Hornet (1951) - Salvage Company Clerk (uncredited)
- Steel Town (1952) - McIntosh (uncredited)
- Deadline – U.S.A. (1952) - Watchman (uncredited)
- Talk About a Stranger (1952) - Sergeant Magnusson (uncredited)
- When in Rome (1952) - Father McGinniss
- The World in His Arms (1952) - Old Sailor (uncredited)
- Les Misérables (1952) - Citizen (uncredited)
- Against All Flags (1952) - Williams
- The Black Castle (1952) - Romley
- My Cousin Rachel (1952) - Seecombe
- Botany Bay (1952) - Warden (uncredited)
- Treasure of the Golden Condor (1953) - Fontaine (uncredited)
- Perils of the Jungle (1953) - Commissioner
- Dangerous When Wet (1953) - Old Salt
- Houdini (1953) - Blacksmith (uncredited)
- How to Marry a Millionaire (1953) - Mr. Otis (uncredited)
- Back to God's Country (1953) - Fitzsimmons
- Prince Valiant (1954) - Patriarch (uncredited)
- Yankee Pasha (1954) - Elias Derby
- Arrow in the Dust (1954) - Tillotson
- Brigadoon (1954) - Archie Beaton
- The Sea Chase (1955) - Trawler Survivor (uncredited)
- The King's Thief (1955) - Simon
- The Court Jester (1955) - Friar (uncredited)
- The Oklahoma Woman (1956) - Ed Grant
- Congo Crossing (1956) - Emile Zorfus
- Duel at Apache Wells (1957) - Dr. Munn (uncredited)
- The Lonely Man (1957) - Mr. MacGregor (uncredited)
- The Story of Mankind (1957) - High Tribunal Clerk
- Jet Over the Atlantic (1959) - Mr. Priestwood
- North to Alaska (1960) - Purser (uncredited)
- One Hundred and One Dalmatians (1961) - Towser (voice)
- Frontier Uprising (1961) - Charley Bridger
- Most Dangerous Man Alive (1961) - Dr. Meeker
- The Notorious Landlady (1962) - Farmer (uncredited)
- Jack the Giant Killer (1962) - Chancellor
- How the West Was Won (1962) - Parson Alec Harvey (uncredited)
- The Sword in the Stone (1963) - Knights / Nobles in Crowd (voice, uncredited) (final film role)
