= The Forty-Niners (1954 film) =

1954 American western film

- Theatrical release poster
- Directed by: Thomas Carr
- Written by: Daniel B. Ullman
- Produced by: Vincent M. Fennelly
- Starring: Wild Bill Elliott; Virginia Grey; Harry Morgan; John Doucette; Lane Bradford; I. Stanford Jolley
- Cinematography: Ernest Miller
- Edited by: Sam Fields
- Music by: Raoul Kraushaar
- Production company: Westwood Productions
- Distributed by: Allied Artists Pictures
- Release date: May 4, 1954
- Running time: 71 minutes
- Country: United States
- Language: English

The Forty-Niners is a 1954 American Western film directed by Thomas Carr and written by Daniel B. Ullman. The film stars Wild Bill Elliott, Virginia Grey, Harry Morgan, John Doucette, Lane Bradford and I. Stanford Jolley. The film was released on May 4, 1954, by Allied Artists Pictures.

== Plot ==
Behind a narration in the style of Jack Webb on TV's "Dragnet", U.S. Marshal Sam Nelson, posing as Sam Smith, is sent to a gold-boom town in California to learn the identity of three killers. Posing as a gunman and killer, he soon strikes up a friendship with card-sharp Alf Billings after saving him from being lynched when caught cheating in a card game. Billings suggests they become partners as his skill with cards (overlooking the near lynching he just escaped) and Sam's ability with guns should make them a fortune. Sam agrees, hoping that Billings will lead him to the men he is hunting. Billings leads him to Coldwater sheriff William Norris and Ernie Walker, Norris's partner in a saloon and gambling operation, both implicated in the murder case Sam is investigating.

== Cast ==
- Wild Bill Elliott as Sam Nelson
- Virginia Grey as Stella Walker
- Harry Morgan as Alf Billings
- John Doucette as Ernie Walker
- Lane Bradford as William Norris
- I. Stanford Jolley as Everett
- Harry Lauter as Gambler
- Earle Hodgins as Hotel Clerk
- Dean Cromer as Sloane
- Ralph Sanford as Bartender
