= Alias Jane Doe =

1951 radio adventure drama

- Genre: Adventure drama
- Running time: 30 minutes
- Country of origin: United States
- Language(s): English
- Syndicates: CBS
- Starring: Kay Phillips
- Announcer: Frank Martin
- Written by: Kay Phillips; E. Jack Neuman; John Michael Hayes
- Directed by: Robert Shue
- Produced by: Rogers Brackett
- Sponsored by: Toni home permanent Gillette razors

Alias Jane Doe is a radio adventure drama produced in the United States. It was broadcast on CBS April 7, 1951 - September 22, 1951.

== Summary ==
Episodes of Alias Jane Doe related the adventures of "a female magazine reporter who dons various disguises to acquire story material." The "Jane Doe" in the title was the byline used by the reporter.

The program was produced by the Foote, Cone & Belding advertising agency. An article in the March 17, 1951, issue of the trade publication Billboard said that the show "is the result of an idea whipped up in the agency's office" in Hollywood, California. It ran on Saturdays as a replacement for the Give and Take program and was sponsored by Toni Home Permanents and Gillette razors.

A review in the May 12, 1951, issue of Billboard panned the program's April 28, 1951, broadcast. Leon Morse wrote, in part: "This is the kind of half-baked concoction that perpetuates phony juvenile impressions of journalism. Alias Jane Doe is the story of a girl reporter who has the unique ability to change voices and personality according to the assignments her little brain devises." He also cited the program's "slow pacing [and] bad writing."

== Personnel ==
Kay Phillips played the title character, and Tudor Owen played her editor. Lamont Johnson and Eric Sinclair had supporting roles. James Dean was heard on the program in July 1951. Frank Martin was the announcer.

The producer was Rogers Brackett, and the director was Robert Shue. Phillips was a writer, along with E. Jack Neuman and John Michael Hayes.
