= Eunice Wilson =

American singer

Eunice Wilson (April 2, 1911, Michigan – January 10, 1984, Los Angeles) was a singer, dancer, and actress who performed in the 1930s and was in 1930s films and a pair of late 1940s films. Her performances were featured in several films.

She performed in Leonard Reed's revue.

== Filmography ==
- Murder in Harlem (1935)
- An All-Colored Vaudeville Show (1935), reworked and reissued as Dixieland Jamboree (1946) by Warner Brothers
- Sun Tan Ranch (1948)
- No Time for Romance (1948)
