= Riot in Cell Block 11 =

1954 American film by Don Siegel

- Theatrical release poster
- Directed by: Don Siegel
- Screenplay by: Richard Collins
- Produced by: Walter Wanger
- Starring: Neville Brand; Emile Meyer; Frank Faylen; Leo Gordon; Robert Osterloh
- Cinematography: Russell Harlan
- Edited by: Bruce B. Pierce
- Music by: Herschel Burke Gilbert
- Production company: Walter Wanger Productions
- Distributed by: Allied Artists Pictures
- Release dates: February 18, 1954 (New York); February 28, 1954 (U.S.)
- Running time: 80 minutes
- Country: United States
- Language: English
- Budget: $298,780
- Box office: $1,531,755

Riot in Cell Block 11 is a 1954 American prison thriller film noir directed by Don Siegel, produced by Walter Wanger, and starring Neville Brand, Emile Meyer, Frank Faylen, Leo Gordon and Robert Osterloh. Shot on location at California's Folsom State Prison, the film depicts a prisoner uprising in response to inhumane conditions.

Distributed by Allied Artists in February 1954, the film was a critical and commercial success. At the 8th British Academy Film Awards, the film was nominated for Best Film and Best Foreign Actor (for Neville Brand). Siegel was nominated for a Directors Guild of America Award. Director Quentin Tarantino called it "the best prison film ever made."

== Plot ==
One night, several prison inmates take guards prisoner to protest brutal conditions in their prison. They then make their demands known to prison warden Reynolds, a liberal-minded administrator who has complained for many years about the same conditions. James V. Dunn, the prisoners' leader, meets the press outside the cell block and makes demands that they will no longer tolerate the brutal guards, substandard food, overcrowding, and barely livable conditions.

The next day inmates from two other blocks start a riot but they are forced back into the cell blocks by the state police. Negotiations between the inmates and prison officials are stymied by the state politicians who do not want to make any concessions.

Meanwhile, factions within the prisoners begin to vie for power and control within the rebellious cell block. At the same time, the state police are given the go ahead to blow a hole in the wall to end the siege. But unknown to them, the inmates inside create a human shield by tying the hostages to the interior wall.

Just in the nick of time, the governor agrees to sign a petition from the prisoners. The riot ends when the inmates see the next-day newspapers saying that they had won. But it is a pyrrhic victory for the leader, Dunn. Two weeks later he is called to the warden's office. The state legislature had overturned the governor's signature thus repudiating all the prisoners' demands.

The Warden tells Dunn that he will stand trial for leading the riot and taking hostages, charges that will mostly likely mean an additional 30-year sentence. But the Warden, who explains that he is to be replaced, tells Dunn that he did get a small victory: the mentally ill inmates are to be moved to asylums and some prisoners will be paroled. The Warden tells Dunn that his actions were front-page news which may bring about some good.

== Cast ==
- Neville Brand as James V. Dunn
- Emile Meyer as Warden Reynolds
- Frank Faylen as Commissioner Haskell
- Leo Gordon as Crazy Mike Carnie
- Robert Osterloh as The Colonel
- Paul Frees as Guard Monroe
- Don Keefer as Reporter
- Alvy Moore as Gator
- Dabbs Greer as Schuyler
- Whit Bissell as Snader
- James Anderson as Guard Acton
- Carleton Young as Guard Captain Barrett
- Harold J. Kennedy as Reporter
- William Schallert as Reporter
- Jonathan Hole as Reporter Russell
- Robert Patten as Frank
- William Phipps as Mickey
- Joel Fluellen as Al
- Roy Glenn as Guard Delmar
- Joe Kerr as Mac
- John Tarangelo as Manuel
- Robert Burton as Guard Ambrose

== Production ==
The downbeat ending is indicative of the realistic social commentary prevalent throughout the film. The producer Walter Wanger had recently been in prison for shooting his wife's lover, and his experience there motivated this production. The film was shot on location at Folsom State Prison with real inmates and guards playing background roles. Siegel agreed to direct the movie over eight weeks for a flat fee of $10,000.

Riot in Cell Block 11 was the first film work for Sam Peckinpah. Peckinpah was hired as a third assistant casting director by Don Siegel. Reportedly, the warden was reluctant to allow the filmmakers to work at Folsom Prison until he was introduced to Peckinpah. The warden knew his influential family of judges from Fresno, California, and immediately became cooperative.

Actor Leo Gordon, who plays hardened convict Carney, had served five years in San Quentin State Prison for armed robbery. Because of this, the warden at Folsom originally objected to Gordon appearing in the film, but Siegel convinced him that Gordon was no threat to the prison.

Siegel's location work and his use of actual prisoners as extras made a lasting impression on Peckinpah's later career. He would work as an assistant to Siegel on four additional films including Private Hell 36 (1954), An Annapolis Story (1955), Invasion of the Body Snatchers (1956) and Crime in the Streets (1956).

== Reception ==
=== Box office and exhibition ===
Upon its initial release in the United Kingdom the film was banned.

The film made over $2 million in rentals meaning it was the most successful at that point in the history of Allied Artists, replacing The Babe Ruth Story. The film made a profit of $297,702.

=== Critical response ===
[A]though it never needs to take off its hat to any of its brash predecessors for lack of hard, cruel detail, Riot in Cell Block 11 maintains such a disciplined grip on reality that it acquires the authority of a documentary.

— Film critic Paul Beckley, New York Herald, February 19, 1954

When the film was first released, New York Times film critic A. H. Weiler gave the film a positive review and its social commentary. He wrote, "The grim business of melodrama behind prison walls, so often depicted in standard, banal fashion in films, is given both tension and dignity in Riot in Cell Block 11, which erupted onto the Mayfair's screen yesterday. Although it is explosive enough to satisfy the most rabid of the "cons versus 'screws'" school of moviegoer, it also makes a sincere and adult plea for a captive male society revolting against penal injustices. In its own small way, Riot in Cell Block 11 is a realistic and effective combination of brawn, brains and heart ... Riot in Cell Block 11, in short, punches and preaches with authority."

The staff at Variety magazine also praised the film, writing, "The pros and cons of prison riots are stated articulately in the Richard Collins screen story, and producer Walter Wanger uses a realistic, almost documentary, style to make his point for needed reforms in the operation of penal institutions ... A standout performance is given by Emile Meyer, the warden who understands the prisoners' problems."

=== Awards ===
Nominations:

- British Academy Film Awards: Best Film from any Source, 1955
- British Academy Film Awards: Best Foreign Actor, Neville Brand; 1955
- Directors Guild of America: Outstanding Directorial Achievement in Motion Pictures, Don Siegel; 1955

== See also ==
- "Riot in Cell Block Number 9," a 1954 song

== Sources ==
- Kass, Judith M. (1975). Don Seigel: The Hollywood Professionals, Volume 4 (1975 ed.). New York: Tanvity Press. p. 207. ISBN 0-498-01665-X.
