= The Return of Jack Slade =

1955 film

- Directed by: Harold D. Schuster
- Written by: Warren Douglas
- Produced by: John H. Burrows; Lindsley Parsons
- Starring: John Ericson; Mari Blanchard; Neville Brand
- Cinematography: William A. Sickner
- Edited by: Maurice Wright
- Music by: Paul Dunlap
- Production company: Lindsley Parsons Picture Corporation
- Distributed by: Allied Artists Pictures
- Release date: October 9, 1955
- Running time: 79 minutes
- Country: United States
- Language: English

The Return of Jack Slade is a 1955 American Western film directed by Harold D. Schuster and starring John Ericson, Mari Blanchard and Neville Brand. It is a loose sequel to the 1953 film Jack Slade.

== Cast ==
- John Ericson as Jack Slade, Jr.
- Mari Blanchard as Texas Rose
- Neville Brand as Harry Sutton
- Max Showalter as Billy Wilcox
- Jon Shepodd as Johnny Turner
- Howard Petrie as Joseph Ryan
- John Dennis as Kid Stanley
- Angie Dickinson as Polly Logan
- Donna Drew as Laughing Sam
- Michael Ross as Little Blue Raven
- Lyla Graham as Abilene
- Alan Wells as George Hagen
- Raymond Bailey as Professor
