= Perils of the Jungle (1953 film) =

1953 film by George Blair

- Theatrical Poster
- Directed by: George Blair
- Screenplay by: Frank Hart Taussig; Robert T. Smith
- Story by: Frank Hart Taussig; Robert T. Smith
- Produced by: Walter White Jr.
- Starring: Clyde Beatty; Stanley Farrar; Phyllis Coates; John Doucette; Leonard Mudie
- Cinematography: E.J. Nicholson
- Edited by: Robert B. Warwick Jr.
- Production company: Commodore Productions
- Distributed by: Lippert Pictures
- Release date: March 20, 1953 (USA Theatrical)
- Running time: 63 minutes
- Country: United States
- Language: English

Perils of the Jungle is a 1953 American black and white adventure film directed by George Blair, featuring animal trainer and circus impresario Clyde Beatty and Phyllis Coates, known for her roles in serials and "B" films. Perennial "heavy" John Doucette also appeared in the film.

== Plot ==
In order to save them from extinction, explorer Grantland Cunningham (Stanley Farrar) engages animal trainer Clyde Beatty to accompany him to Africa to capture a few of the last known Nubian lions. The pair run afoul of hunters led by Gorman (John Doucette) who wish to kill rather than capture the big cats. Beatty and Cunningham are aided in their quest by humanitarian Jo Carter (Phyllis Coates).

Gorman is nearly killed by a gorilla and when Clyde saves him, he offers to help find lions. The expedition to Southern Rhodesia takes the two men into dangerous tribal areas. After a series of dangerous encounters, both Clyde and Grant make it back to safety, vowing to set out on more adventures in the future.

== Cast ==
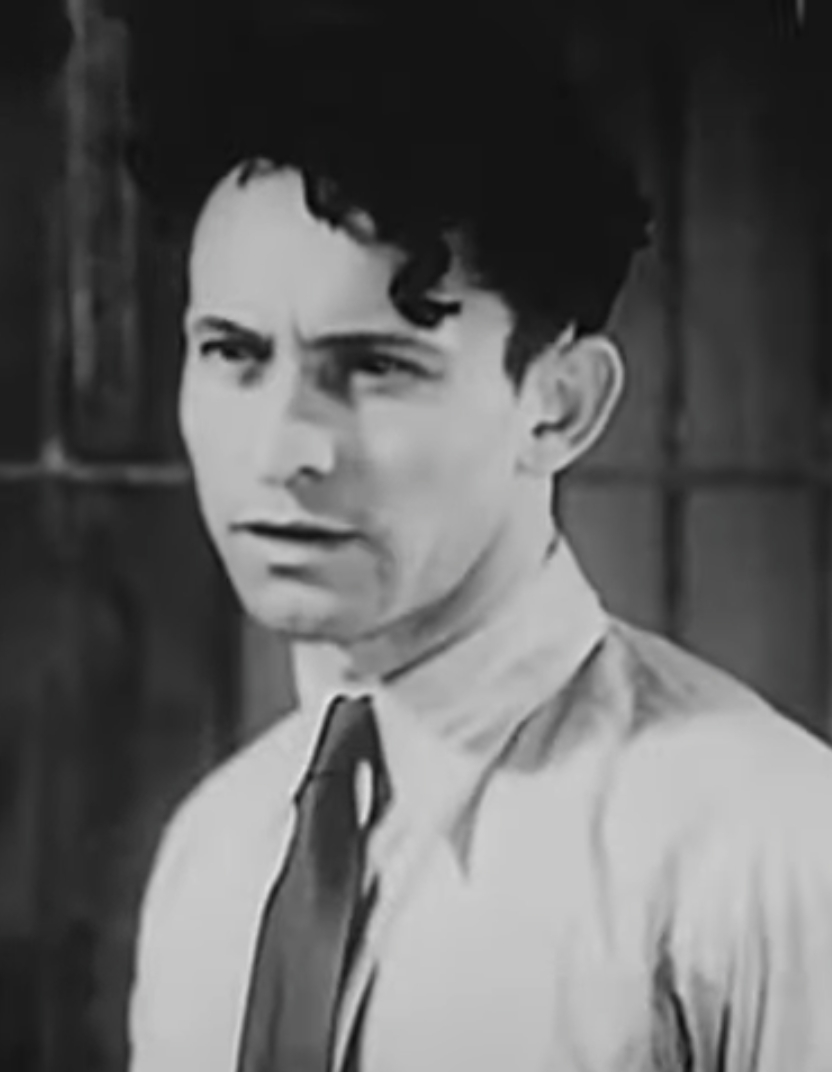
Clyde Beatty in the film

- Clyde Beatty as Clyde Beatty
- Stanley Farrar as Grantland Cunningham
- Phyllis Coates as Jo Carter
- John Doucette as Gorman
- Leonard Mudie as Grubbs
- Roy Glenn as Korjah
- Olaf Hytten as Mac
- Stanley Farrar as Grantland Cunningham
- Joel Fluellen as Kenny
- Tudor Owen as Commissioner
- Shelby Bacon as Boy King

Clyde Beatty

== Production ==
Perils of the Jungle was first released March 3, 1953. In 2006, the film was released by St Clair Vision as part of a 3-disk compilation titled, King of Kong Island and Other Ape Flicks and in 2009, by Alpha Video as a single.

== Reception ==
Hal Erickson of Rovi noted that the film "looks suspiciously like two half-hour TV pilots strung together."
