= Neville Brand =

American actor (1920–1992)

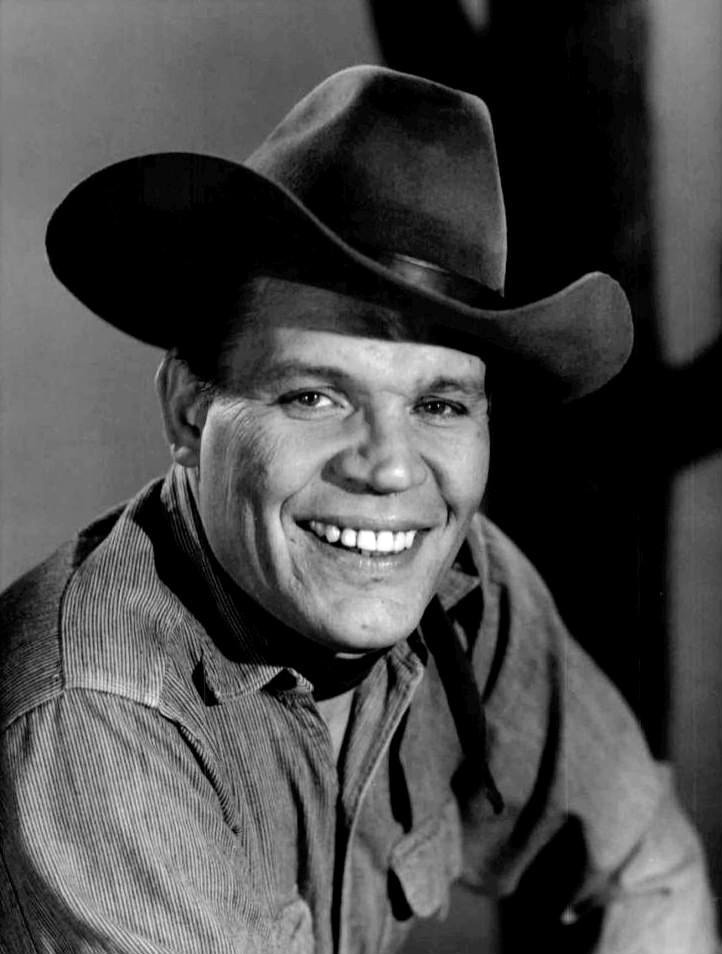
- Brand in 1966
- Born: Lawrence Neville Brand; August 13, 1920; Griswold, Iowa, U.S.
- Died: April 16, 1992 (aged 71); Sacramento, California, U.S.
- Resting place: East Lawn Memorial Park
- Education: American Theatre Wing
- Occupations: Soldier; actor
- Years active: 1949–1985
- Spouses: Jean Enfield (m. 19??; div. 1955) Laura Rae Araujo (m. 1957; div. 1969); Mae Brand (m. 19??; d. 1992)
- Children: 3
- Military career
- Allegiance: United States
- Branch: Illinois Army National Guard; United States Army
- Service years: 1939–41 (National Guard); 1941–45 (Army)
- Rank: Sergeant
- Units: 129th Infantry Regiment; 83rd Infantry Division; 331st Infantry Regiment
- Conflicts: World War II; European theatre of Operations; Battle of the Bulge; Siegfried Line campaign; Central European campaign

Lawrence Neville Brand (August 13, 1920 – April 16, 1992) was an American soldier and actor. He was known for playing villainous or antagonistic character roles in Westerns, crime dramas and films noir, and was nominated for a BAFTA Award for his performance in Riot in Cell Block 11 (1954).

During World War II, Brand served in the 331st Infantry Regiment of the 83rd Infantry Division in the U.S. Army, in the European theatre. He received multiple meritorious citations for his service, including the Silver Star for valor.

== Early years ==
Brand was born in Griswold, Iowa and raised in Kewanee, Illinois. After he graduated from high school, he joined the Army.

== War service ==
Brand entered the Illinois Army National Guard on October 23, 1939 as a private in Company F, 129th Infantry Regiment. He was enlisted in the United States Army as Corporal Neville L. Brand, infantryman on March 5, 1941. He trained at Fort Carson and served in World War II, seeing action with B Company, 331st Infantry Regiment of the 83rd Infantry Division (Thunderbolt Division) in the Ardennes, Rhineland and Central European campaigns. Brand, a sergeant and platoon leader, was wounded in action along the Weser River on April 7, 1945. He was shot in the upper right arm and nearly bled to death.

Brand was awarded the Silver Star, the third-highest decoration for valor in the U.S. military, for gallantry in combat. His other awards and decorations were the Purple Heart, the Good Conduct Medal, the American Defense Service Medal, the European-African-Middle Eastern Campaign Medal with three Battle Stars, one Overseas Service Bar, one Service Stripe and the Combat Infantryman Badge. In a 1966 interview Brand explained the Silver Star, stating that withering fire from German machine guns in a hunting lodge kept him and his unit pinned down. "I must have flipped my lid," he said. "I decided to go into that lodge." He was discharged in October 1945.

Brand was sometimes cited in media reports as the fourth most-decorated American serviceman of the war, but this was incorrect and repeatedly denied by Brand himself.

=== Medals and ribbons ===
Silver Star
Purple Heart
Good Conduct Medal
American Defense Service Medal
European–African–Middle Eastern Campaign Medal
Combat Infantryman Badge
World War II Victory Medal
Bronze Star for Meritorious Service
American Campaign Medal
Army of Occupation Medal

== Acting career ==
=== Early roles ===
After his discharge, Brand worked on a 1946 Army Signal Corps film with Charlton Heston and next settled in Greenwich Village and enrolled at the American Theatre Wing, working off-Broadway, including Jean-Paul Sartre's The Victors. He also attended the Geller Drama School in Los Angeles on the G.I. Bill.

Brand had uncredited roles in Battleground (1949) and Port of New York (1949). His first credited part was in D.O.A. (1950) as a henchman named Chester. His hulking physique, rough-hewn, craggy-faced looks and gravelly voice led to his largely playing gangsters, Western outlaws and various screen "heavies", cops and other tough-guy roles throughout his career.

Brand was uncredited in My Foolish Heart (1949), Where the Sidewalk Ends (1950) (both starring Dana Andrews), and curiously Kiss Tomorrow Goodbye where he plays a significant early role as James Cagney's fellow chain gang inmate, (1950) but had a good role on TV in The Bigelow Theatre. His parts slowly grew bigger: Halls of Montezuma (1951), Only the Valiant (1951), The Mob (1951), and Red Mountain (1951).

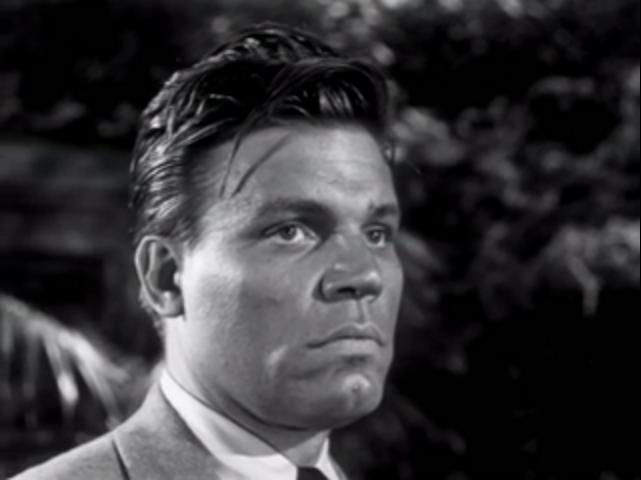
Brand in Kansas City Confidential (1952)

On television, he did a short, Benjy (1951), and episodes of The Unexpected and Your Favorite Story. He was in Kansas City Confidential (1952), The Turning Point (1952), and, notably, Stalag 17 (1953).

=== Leading man ===
As a supporting actor, he appeared in The Charge at Feather River (1953), The Man from the Alamo (1953), and Gun Fury (1953). Brand moved up to leading roles with Man Crazy (1953) and then Riot in Cell Block 11 (1954). The latter role, as the leader of a prison uprising, earned him a BAFTA nomination for Best Foreign Actor at the 8th British Academy Film Awards, but he lost to Marlon Brando for On the Waterfront. Brand was down the cast list for The Lone Gun (1954) but had the lead in Return from the Sea (1954).

Brand had a supporting role in The Prodigal (1955) and The Return of Jack Slade and guest roles in Appointment with Adventure, Screen Directors Playhouse, Studio One in Hollywood, Jane Wyman Presents The Fireside Theatre, Chevron Hall of Stars, Schlitz Playhouse, General Electric Theater, The United States Steel Hour, and Stage 7.

He had lead film roles in Bobby Ware Is Missing (1955) and Fury at Gunsight Pass (1956) and supported in Raw Edge (1956), and Mohawk (1956). He had the distinction of being the first actor to portray outlaw Butch Cassidy, in the film The Three Outlaws opposite Alan Hale Jr. as the Sundance Kid. He followed it with Gun Brothers (1956).

Brand became well known as a villain when he killed the character played by Elvis Presley in his debut film Love Me Tender (1956). He was in The Way to the Gold (1957), The Lonely Man (1957), The Tin Star (1957), Cry Terror! (1958), and Badman's Country (1958).

He often had better roles on television, including such shows as Climax!, Playhouse 90, Target and notably an adaptation of All the King's Men for Kraft Television Theatre, directed by Sidney Lumet, playing Willie Stark, for which he earned a Sylvania Award in 1958.

Brand was a guest star on The Texan, Pursuit, Dick Powell's Zane Grey Theatre, and The Dupont Show of the Month (doing Body and Soul with Ben Gazzara).

=== Al Capone and other TV roles ===
Brand twice portrayed Al Capone on the television series The Untouchables, in the pilot and opening scene of the premiere "The Empty Chair" (although uncredited) and then in the double episode "The Big Train"; as well as often glimpses in flashback throughout the series.

Brand was in Five Gates to Hell (1959), The Adventures of Huckleberry Finn (1960), The Last Sunset (1961), and The George Raft Story (1961), reprising his role as Al Capone in the last.

He guest-starred on Straightaway, Cain's Hundred, Death Valley Days, The Joey Bishop Show, Naked City, The DuPont Show of the Week, Ben Casey, Rawhide, The Lieutenant, Theatre of Stars, Arrest and Trial, Destry, Wagon Train, Suspense, Combat!, Gunsmoke, Bonanza and The Virginian.

He also portrayed a prison guard of Birdman of Alcatraz, was second billed in Hero's Island (1962) and had a key role in That Darn Cat! (1965).

Brand co-starred with George Takei in "The Encounter," a 1964 episode of the Twilight Zone, as a World War II veteran. CBS considered the episode's theme of US-Japanese hatred "too disturbing" to include when the series was syndicated. "The Encounter" was not seen after its initial airing until it was released on video in 1992 as part of the Treasures of the Twilight Zone collection.

Brand was given the star role in a TV series, Laredo (1965–67) which ran for 56 episodes.

Brand was in The Desperados (1969) and played U.S. Navy Lieutenant Kaminsky, ignored as he tried to warn his commander of the opening skirmish in Tora! Tora! Tora! (1970).

=== 1970s ===
In the 1970s, Brand could be seen in The Chicago Teddy Bears and The Smith Family. He played Hoss Cartwright's (Dan Blocker) Swedish uncle Gunnar Borgstrom on Bonanza in the episode "The Last Viking".

He appeared in Longstreet (1972), Alias Smith and Jones (1971-1972), Marcus Welby, M.D. (1972), Two for the Money (1972), No Place to Run (1972), The Police Connection (1972), Scalawag (1973), Cahill U.S. Marshal (1973), The Magician (1973), The Deadly Trackers (1973), Killdozer (1974), Police Story (1975), Police Woman (1975), Barbary Coast (1975), Kojak (1975), Mobile One (1975), Psychic Killer (1975), McCloud (1972-1975), The Quest (1976), and Captains and the Kings (1976).

Brand was top billed in Eaten Alive (1976) directed by Tobe Hooper. He was in Fire! (1977), The Mouse and His Child (1977), Baretta (1977), Captains Courageous (1977), Man from Atlantis (1977), Hi-Riders (1978), Quincy, M.E. (1979), and The Seekers (1979). He had a key part in Five Days from Home (1978) directed by George Peppard, and in Angels' Brigade (1979).

=== 1980s ===
In 1980, Brand appeared as Major Marvin Groper in The Ninth Configuration, written and directed by The Exorcist author William Peter Blatty.

His final roles included Fantasy Island, Without Warning (1980), Harper Valley P.T.A., and The Return (1982). He was top billed in his last film, Evils of the Night (1985).

== Personal life ==
Brand and his wife Rae had three daughters.

Brand was an insatiable reader who amassed a collection of 30,000 books over the years, one of the largest private libraries in Los Angeles. Most of his collection was destroyed in a 1978 fire at his Malibu home.

His wartime service caused him post-traumatic stress disorder that led to bouts of alcoholism. In 1975, he said in an interview that his addiction had cost him most of his fortune.

As an active member of both the Hollywood Republican Committee and the Motion Picture Alliance for the Preservation of American Ideals, Brand consistently championed conservative causes within the film industry, actively supporting a succession of Republican campaigns and presidential administrations spanning Thomas E. Dewey, Dwight D. Eisenhower, Barry Goldwater, Richard Nixon, Gerald Ford, Ronald Reagan, and George H.W. Bush.

He was also a self-described, lifelong Presbyterian.

== Death ==
Brand died from emphysema at Sutter General Hospital in Sacramento, California on April 16, 1992 at the age of 71. After a private funeral service, he was cremated, and his remains were interred in a niche of the Morning Glory Room at East Lawn Memorial Park in Sacramento.

== Selected filmography ==
=== Film ===
- Port of New York (1949) as Ike – Stasser's Henchman (uncredited)
- My Foolish Heart (1949) as Football Game Spectator (uncredited)
- D.O.A. (1950) as Chester
- Where the Sidewalk Ends (1950) as Steve, Scalise Hood (uncredited)
- Kiss Tomorrow Goodbye (1950) as Carleton (uncredited)
- Halls of Montezuma (1951) as Sgt. Zelenko
- Only the Valiant (1951) as Sgt. Ben Murdock
- The Mob (1951) as Gunner
- Red Mountain (1951) as Lt. Dixon
- Flame of Araby (1951) as Kral
- Kansas City Confidential (1952) as Boyd Kane
- The Turning Point (1952) as Red
- Stalag 17 (1953) as Duke
- The Charge at Feather River (1953) as Pvt. Morgan
- The Man from the Alamo (1953) as Dawes
- Gun Fury (1953) as Brazos
- Man Crazy (1953) as Paul Wocynski
- Riot in Cell Block 11 (1954) as James V. Dunn
- Prince Valiant (1954) as Viking Warrior Chief (uncredited)
- The Lone Gun (1954) as Tray Moran
- Return from the Sea (1954) as CPO Chuck 'Soup Bowl' MacLish
- The Prodigal (1955) as Rhakim
- The Return of Jack Slade (1955) as Harry Sutton
- Bobby Ware Is Missing (1955) as Police Lt. Andy Flynn
- Fury at Gunsight Pass (1956) as Dirk Hogan
- Raw Edge (1956) as Tarp Penny
- Mohawk (1956) as Rokhawah
- The Three Outlaws (1956) as Butch Cassidy
- Gun Brothers (1956) as Jubal Santee
- Love Me Tender (1956) as Mike Gavin
- The Way to the Gold (1957) as Little Brother Williams
- The Lonely Man (1957) as King Fisher
- The Tin Star (1957) as Bart Bogardus
- Cry Terror! (1958) as Steve
- Badman's Country (1958) as Butch Cassidy
- Five Gates to Hell (1959) as Chen Pamok
- The Adventures of Huckleberry Finn (1960) as Pap Finn
- The Last Sunset (1961) as Frank Hobbs
- The George Raft Story (1961) as Al Capone
- Birdman of Alcatraz (1962) as Bull Ransom
- Hero's Island (1962) as Kingstree
- That Darn Cat! (1965) as Dan
- Three Guns for Texas (1968) as Texas Ranger Reese Bennett
- Backtrack (1969) as Texas Ranger Reese Bennett (archive footage)
- The Desperados (1969) as Marshal Kilpatrick
- Tora! Tora! Tora! (1970) as Lieutenant Kaminsky
- The Mad Bomber (1973) as George Fromley
- This Is a Hijack (1973) as Dominic
- Cahill U.S. Marshal (1973) as Lightfoot
- Scalawag (1973) as Brimstone / Mudhook
- The Deadly Trackers (1973) as Choo Choo
- Killdozer! (1974) (TV) as Chub Foster
- Psychic Killer (1975) as Lemonowski
- Death Stalk (1975) (TV) as Cal Shepherd
- Eaten Alive (1976) as Judd
- Fire! (1977) (TV) as Larry Durant
- The Mouse and His Child (1977) as Iggy (voice)
- Hi-Riders (1978) as Red
- The Seekers (1979) (TV) as Capt. Isaac Drew
- Five Days from Home (1979) as Inspector Markley
- Angels' Brigade (1979) as Miller
- The Ninth Configuration (1980) as Maj. Marvin Groper
- Without Warning (1980) as Leo
- The Return (1980) as Walt
- Evils of the Night (1985) as Kurt (filmed in 1983; final film role)

=== Television ===
- Stage 7 – episode "Armed" (1955) as Maj. Stevens
- The Scarface Mob – television movie (1959) as Al Capone
- The Untouchables – episodes "Pilot" (1959), "The Big Train, Parts 1 and 2" (1961) and "The Seventh Vote" (1961) as Al Capone (the last uncredited)
- Westinghouse Desilu Playhouse – episodes "The Untouchables: Parts 1 & 2" (1959) as Al Capone
- Bonanza - episodes "The Last Viking (1960) as Gunnar Borgstrom, "The Luck of Pepper Shannon" (1970) as Pepper Shannon and "The Rattlesnake Brigade" (1971) as Doyle
- Rawhide – episode "Incident of the Devil and His Due" (1960) as Gaff
- Straightaway – episode "The Tin Caesar" (1961) as Sheriff Bardeen
- Death Valley Days – episode "Preacher with a Past" (1962) as John Wesley Hardin
- Ben Casey – episode "Will Everyone Who Believes in Terry Dunne Please Applaud" (1963) as Terry Dunne
- The Lieutenant – episode "The Two Star Giant" (1963) as General Stone
- Rawhide – episode "Incident of the Red Wind" (1963) as Lou Bowdark
- Wagon Train (1964) as Zebedee Titus / Sheriff Frank Lewis aka Jed Whitmore
- Destry – episode "The Solid Gold Girl" (1964) as Johnny Washburn
- The Twilight Zone – episode "The Encounter" (1964) as Fenton
- Combat! – episode "Fly Away Home" (1964) as Sergeant Keeley
- Gunsmoke – episode "Kioga" (1965) as Jayce McCaw
- The Virginian (1965–1970) as Sheriff Wintle / Reese Bennett
- Laredo (1965–1967) as Reese Bennett
- Daniel Boone – episode "Tanner" (1967) as Tanner
- Tarzan – episode "Alex the Great" (1968) as Alex Spence
- Alias Smith and Jones (1971–1972) as Chuck Gorman / Sam Bacon
- Marcus Welby, M.D. – episode "Don't Talk About Darkness" (1972) as Kenny Carpenter
- Longstreet – episode "Survival Times Two" (1972) as La Brien
- McCloud - episodes "Fifth Man in a String Quartet" (1972) as Fred Schultke, "The Solid Gold Swingers" (1973) as Detective Lt. Roy Mackie and "Three Guns for New York" (1975) as Burl Connors
- The Magician – episode "Lighting on a Dry Day" (1973) as Sheriff Platt
- Kojak – episode – "Sweeter Than Life" (1975) as Sonny South
- Police Story – episode "War Games" (1975) as Norman Schoeler
- Police Woman – episode "The Loner" (1975) as Briscoe
- Swiss Family Robinson – episodes "Jean LaFitte: Parts 1 & 2" (1976) as Gambi
- Captains and the Kings (1976) as O'Herlihy
- Captains Courageous (1977) as Little Penn
- The Eddie Capra Mysteries – episode "Murder Plays a Dead Hand" (1979) as Frankie Dallas
- Quincy, M.E. – episode "Dark Angel" (1979) as Police Officer Tommy Bates
- Fantasy Island – episode "Nona/One Million B.C." (1980) as Lucus
