= Return from the Sea =

1954 film by Lesley Selander

- Directed by: Lesley Selander
- Screenplay by: George Waggner
- Based on: No Home of His Own by Jacland Marmur
- Produced by: Scott R. Dunlap
- Starring: Jan Sterling; Neville Brand; John Doucette
- Cinematography: Harry Neumann
- Edited by: John C. Fuller
- Music by: Marlin Skiles; Paul Dunlap
- Production company: Scott R. Dunlap Productions
- Distributed by: Allied Artists Pictures Corporation
- Release date: July 28, 1954
- Running time: 79 minutes
- Country: United States
- Language: English

Return from the Sea is a 1954 American drama film directed by Lesley Selander and starring Jan Sterling, Neville Brand and John Doucette. It was based on a novelette No Home of His Own by Jacland Marmur that appeared in Saturday Evening Post in 1952. Filming took place in San Diego and on the USS Maddox (DD-731). The film's sets were designed by the art director Dave Milton. It was distributed by Allied Artists Pictures.

== Plot ==
Chuck MacLish is a hardened career naval Chief Petty Officer, who is a boisterous, love 'em and leave 'em type — until he meets a lonely, widowed waitress named Frieda.

== Cast ==
- Jan Sterling as Frieda - Waitress
- Neville Brand as CPO Chuck 'Soup Bowl' MacLish
- John Doucette as Jimmy
- Paul Langton as Lt. Manley
- John Pickard as Spike
- Don Haggerty as Tompkins
- Alvy Moore as Smitty
- Robert Arthur as Porter
- Lloyd Corrigan as Pinky
- Lee Roberts as Doctor
- Ward Wood as Clarke
- Robert Patten as Welch
- James Best as Barr
- John Tarangelo as Doyle
- Bill Gentry as Harris
- Herb Vigran as Doctor
- Pamela Duncan as Nurse
- Carol Brewster as New Waitress
