= Merrily We Go to Hell =

1932 film

- lobby card
- Directed by: Dorothy Arzner
- Screenplay by: Edwin Justus Mayer
- Based on: I, Jerry, Take Thee, Joan (1931 novel) by Cleo Lucas
- Starring: Sylvia Sidney; Fredric March
- Cinematography: David Abel
- Edited by: Jane Loring
- Production company: Paramount Publix Corp.
- Distributed by: Paramount Publix Corp.
- Release date: June 10, 1932 (US)
- Running time: 83 minutes
- Country: United States
- Language: English

Merrily We Go to Hell is a 1932 American pre-Code romantic comedy-drama film directed by Dorothy Arzner for Paramount Pictures, starring Sylvia Sidney and Fredric March. The cast also features a prominent early appearance by Cary Grant. March plays a man undone by alcoholism and adultery. Sidney plays his wife who, when she discovers his adultery, begins an affair with another man.

The picture's title is an example of the sensationalistic titles that were common in the pre-Code era. Many newspapers refused to publicize the film because of its racy title. The title is a line March's character says while making a toast.

== Plot ==
Jerry Corbett, a Chicago reporter and self-styled playwright, meets heiress Joan Prentice at a party and they begin dating. Jerry soon proposes to Joan, and even though his economic prospects are dim and he is an alcoholic, Joan accepts his marriage proposal, against the objections of her father. Even though Jerry becomes heavily intoxicated just before their engagement party, ruining it, Joan stands by him. Jerry writes some plays which are rejected, and fights his alcohol addiction.

He manages to sell a play and the couple travels to New York to watch the production. The star of the play turns out to be Jerry's former girlfriend, Claire Hampstead, and on the premiere night he drinks heavily, becomes inebriated, and mistakes Joan for Claire. Still, Joan stands by him. But, when Joan catches Jerry trying to sneak out to Claire's one night she kicks him out. The following day she tells him that they will have a "modern marriage" and that she intends to have affairs herself.

When Jerry is next seen, he is making a "Merrily we go to hell" toast with Claire. In turn, Joan and her date toast to the "holy state of matrimony–single lives, twin beds and triple bromides in the morning."

Joan becomes pregnant and learns from her doctor that her health is poor. She tries to tell Jerry, but he is too occupied with Claire and she decides to move on. After he is unable to write a successful follow-up play, Jerry eventually realizes that he loves Joan, and regrets his behavior. He commits to sobriety, returns to Chicago, and works as a reporter again, but Joan's father keeps them apart.

Jerry discovers Joan has given birth from a gossip columnist and goes to the hospital to see her. Joan's father tells him the baby died two hours after his birth, that Joan is very ill, and that she does not want to see him ever again. However, Jerry sneaks into her room anyway, while Joan in pain is asking the nurse to send for Jerry, she has to see him. He discovers his distraught wife has been pleading to see him all along. A repentant Jerry pledges his love to her and they kiss.

== Cast ==
- Sylvia Sidney as Joan Prentice
- Fredric March as Jerry Corbett
- Adrianne Allen as Claire Hempstead
- Richard "Skeets" Gallagher as Buck
- George Irving as Mr. Prentice
- Esther Howard as Vi
- Florence Britton as Charlcie
- Charles Coleman as Richard Damery
- Cary Grant as Charlie Baxter
- Kent Taylor as Greg Boleslavsky
- Edwin Maxwell as Jake Symonds
- Mildred Boyd as June
- Harry Cording as Fred
- Leonard Carey as Prentice's Butler
- Robert Greig as Baritone Bartender

== Production ==
The film is based on a 1931 novel, I, Jerry, Take Thee, Joan, by Cleo Lucas. The working title of the film was Jerry and Joan.

David Lewis worked in the Paramount story department and recalled there was resistance to use the story. Then Arzner was looking for a story to star Sylvia Sidney and Lewis passed on the story of her. "She like it enormously and gave it the big push," wrote Lewis. "I think what held it up so long was that it was (for its/day) a frank story about divorce... Dorothy had |taste and talent and used them in making her film."

== Reception ==
Mordaunt Hall, film critic for The New York Times, gave the film a mixed review upon its release. Hall believed the film was wildly funny in stretches, and described the acting by the two leads as "excellent", but believed the scenes in which March played intoxicated went nowhere, and that the script was lacking. Jessie Burns of Script criticised the casting of Fredric March in the film, finding him to be unconvincing, though thought that Adrianne Allen showed her "star" quality in her portrayal of an otherwise "artificial" character.

However, despite similar reviews, which often noted that it had been directed by a woman, the film was one of the more financially successful films that year. The August 1932 issue of Photoplay magazine ranked it in Best Pictures of the Month, with the leads receiving Best Actress and Best Actor accolades.

Judith Mayne writes for the Criterion Collection, "Merrily is a damning portrait of the stakes of marriage, in which the woman takes on the burden of loving a man who is too narcissistic and oblivious to pay attention to her. The humor and banter of the film mask the underlying emotional turmoil. Jerry may be the theater person, but Joan’s happiness and devotion are the true performances, attempts to cover up her desperation.... Indeed, one of the key features of Arzner’s work in general is the ironic detachment her films generate from the norms of female behavior, calling attention to how women suffer in the socially sanctioned situations designed to make them flourish."

== Home media ==
The film was released on Blu-Ray by the Criterion Collection in May 2021.
