= John Doucette =

American actor (1921–1994)

John A. Doucette
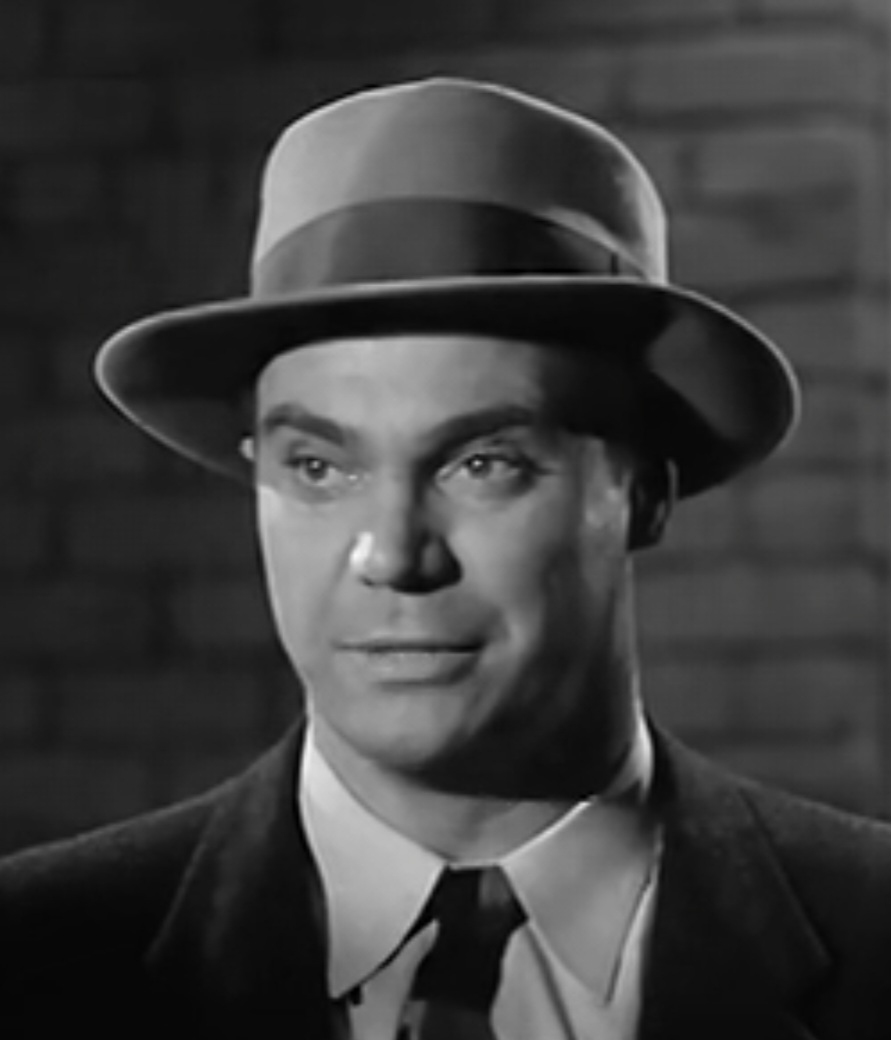
- Doucette in an episode of The Public Defender (1955)
- Born: January 21, 1921; Brockton, Massachusetts, U.S.
- Died: August 16, 1994 (aged 73); Banning, California, U.S.
- Resting place: Mausoleum at Holy Cross Cemetery in Culver City, California
- Occupation: Actor
- Years active: 1941–1987
- Spouse: Katherine Cecilia Sambles (m. 1948; died 1991)
- Children: 8

John Arthur Doucette (January 21, 1921 – August 16, 1994) was an American character actor who performed in more than 280 film and television productions between 1941 and 1987. A man of stocky build who possessed a deep, rich voice, he proved equally adept at portraying characters in Shakespearean plays, Westerns, and modern crime dramas. He is perhaps best remembered, however, for his villainous roles as a movie and television "tough guy".

== Early years ==
John Doucette was born in Brockton, Massachusetts, the eldest of three children of Nellie S. (née Bishop) and Arthur J. Doucette. During his childhood, his family moved frequently, as his father sought work during the Great Depression. He completed grammar school in Haverhill, Massachusetts; graduated from Abraham Lincoln High School in Los Angeles, California; and later, in April 1943, he enlisted in the United States Army and served in Europe as an infantry rifleman during World War II. With regard to Doucette's early experience and training as an actor, he began to perform on stage at the age of 15 in plays at his high school. He subsequently performed at the Pasadena Playhouse before being cast in Hollywood films in the early 1940s.

== Film career ==
Doucette's film debut, in an uncredited role as a reporter, was in Footsteps in the Dark in 1941. He appeared uncredited in at least two other movies before his budding film career was interrupted by his military service during World War II. Following his discharge, he resumed acting in Hollywood, where he soon began to receive more substantial, credited roles in releases by smaller production companies, such as The Burning Cross and The Road to the Big House for Somerset Pictures Corporation in 1947. Doucette continued to progress in obtaining dramatic roles for larger studios, including a small part as an architect in The Fountainhead in 1949. His other notable performances include bit parts in High Noon, The Robe, The Far Country, Sierra, and the mega-budget Cleopatra. Doucette also appeared in the John Wayne films The Sea Chase, The Sons of Katie Elder, True Grit, and Big Jake as well as portraying Gen. Lucian Truscott in the 1970 epic Patton.

== Television ==
Many baby boomers first saw Doucette as the bad guy on television in several episodes of The Lone Ranger. Performing as an outlaw proved to be a natural role for him, considering his rough looks, commanding presence, and skill with a gun. He was considered by many to be among the fastest draws in Hollywood. His roles, however, went well beyond that stereotype. He appeared on a variety of television shows, including The Time Tunnel, Racket Squad, The Range Rider, Wagon Train, The Roy Rogers Show, The Fugitive, The Adventures of Kit Carson, The Cisco Kid, City Detective, Annie Oakley, The Joseph Cotten Show: On Trial, My Friend Flicka, Sky King, The Californians, Broken Arrow, The People's Choice, The Sheriff of Cochise, Bat Masterson, Behind Closed Doors, The Texan, Lawman, The Everglades, Mackenzie's Raiders, Bonanza, The Wild Wild West, The Virginian, Have Gun - Will Travel, Kung Fu, The Rat Patrol, Hogan's Heroes, Adventures of Superman, Sea Hunt, Science Fiction Theatre, Walt Disney Presents, and Tales of Wells Fargo.

Doucette portrayed a police lieutenant, Tom Gregory, on the television version of Big Town. Between 1959 and 1961, he also played Lieutenant Weston on the series Lock-Up, Aaron William Andrews in the comedy The Partners, and bounty hunter Lou Gore in the episode "Dead Aim" on the series Colt .45

Doucette was cast on television as the Apache Chief Geronimo for the 1958 episode "Geronimo" on the Western series Tombstone Territory. He was also cast in 1961 as Captain Cardiff in The Americans, a 17-episode NBC series, starring Darryl Hickman, about how the American Civil War divided families. In 1963 he played "Michael McGoo", a proud & lovable storytelling Irish sailor in the S6E26 edition of Wagon Train.

== Personal life and death ==
Doucette in 1948 married opera singer Katherine Sambles, with whom he had five daughters and three sons. Katherine died in 1991; and three years later, on August 16, 1994, John died of cancer at age 73 at his home in Banning, California. His mausoleum is at Holy Cross Cemetery in Culver City, California.

== Selected filmography ==
=== Films ===
- Footsteps in the Dark (1941) as Reporter (uncredited)
- King of the Mounties (1942, Serial) as Boat Henchman (ch. 9) (uncredited)
- Two Tickets to London (1943) as Larsen (uncredited)
- The Burning Cross (1947) as Toby Mason
- Ride the Pink Horse (1947) as Thug (uncredited)
- The Foxes of Harrow (1947) as Crew Member (uncredited)
- Road to the Big House (1947) as Danny
- I Wouldn't Be in Your Shoes (1948) as Prisoner
- Train to Alcatraz (1948) as McHenry
- Canon City (1948) as George Bauer
- Station West (1948) as Bartender
- In This Corner (1948) as Dunkle (Jimmy's 'second')
- Rogues' Regiment (1948) as Foreign Legion recruit found to have Nazi tattoo (uncredited)
- The Fighting O'Flynn (1949) as Jack
- Criss Cross (1949) as Walt
- Outpost in Morocco (1949) as Card-playing Soldier (uncredited)
- The Crooked Way (1949) as Sgt. Barrett
- Red Stallion in the Rockies (1949) as Ivan (uncredited)
- Batman and Robin (1949, serial) as Henchman [Ch. 2, 3, 6, 10–12, 15] (uncredited)
- Lust for Gold (1949) as Man in Barber Shop (uncredited)
- The Fountainhead (1949) as Gus Webb (uncredited)
- Reign of Terror (1949) as Pierre Blanchard (uncredited)
- Bandits of El Dorado (1949) as Henchman Tucker (uncredited)
- And Baby Makes Three (1949) as Husband (uncredited)
- The Pilgrimage Play (1949) as Lord Zadok
- Singing Guns (1950) as Miner
- The Vicious Years (1950) as Giorgio
- Johnny One-Eye (1950) as Police Detective (uncredited)
- Customs Agent (1950) as Hank (uncredited)
- Return of the Frontiersman (1950) as Evans
- Love That Brute (1950) as Gangster in Big Ed's Cellar (uncredited)
- Sierra (1950) as Jed Coulter
- Winchester '73 (1950) as Roan Daley (uncredited)
- The Iroquois Trail (1950) as Sam Girty
- Broken Arrow (1950) as Mule Driver (uncredited)
- Convicted (1950) as Convict Tex (uncredited)
- Border Treasure (1950) as Bat
- The Fuller Brush Girl (1950) as Police Radio Dispatcher (uncredited)
- The Breaking Point (1950) as Gotch Goten (uncredited)
- Counterspy Meets Scotland Yard (1950) as Larry – a thug
- The Flying Missile (1950) as Air Base Civilian Security Officer (uncredited)
- Sierra Passage (1950) as Sutter's Creek Poker Player (uncredited)
- Up Front (1951) as Walsh (uncredited)
- The Lemon Drop Kid (1951) as Muscleman (uncredited)
- Thunder in God's Country (1951) as Slack Breedon
- Only the Valiant (1951) as Sergeant (uncredited)
- Tales of Robin Hood (1951) as Wilfred
- Cavalry Scout (1951) as Varney
- The Texas Rangers (1951) as Butch Cassidy
- Mask of the Avenger (1951) as Sentry (uncredited)
- Strangers on a Train (1951) as Det. Hammond (uncredited)
- Yukon Manhunt (1951) as Charles Benson
- Corky of Gasoline Alley (1951) as 'Rocky' Bobbie (uncredited)
- The Lady Pays Off (1951) as Cab Driver
- Fixed Bayonets! (1951) as Colonel – 18th Infantry (uncredited)
- Rose of Cimarron (1952) as Drunk
- Phone Call from a Stranger (1952) as Arthur (uncredited)
- The Treasure of Lost Canyon (1952) as Gyppo
- Rancho Notorious (1952) as Whitey (uncredited)
- Bugles in the Afternoon (1952) as Bill (uncredited)
- Deadline - U.S.A. (1952) as Hal (uncredited)
- Carbine Williams (1952) as Gavrey – Prisoner at chain-gang camp (uncredited)
- High Noon (1952) as Trumbull (uncredited)
- The Pride of St. Louis (1952) as Benny (uncredited)
- The San Francisco Story (1952) as Slade (uncredited)
- Desert Pursuit (1952) as Kafan
- Glory Alley (1952) as Thug in Alley (uncredited)
- Back at the Front (1952) as Military Police Sergeant in bar (uncredited)
- Toughest Man in Arizona (1952) as Sgt. Wayne (uncredited)
- Woman in the Dark (1952) as 'Dutch' Bender
- The Silver Whip (1953) as Josh – Red Rock citizen (uncredited)
- Perils of the Jungle (1953) as Gorman
- Ambush at Tomahawk Gap (1953) as Burt – Twin Forks bartender (uncredited)
- Julius Caesar (1953) – as Carpenter, citizen of Rome
- Goldtown Ghost Riders (1953) as Bailey (uncredited)
- War Paint (1953) as Trooper Charnofsky
- City of Bad Men (1953) as Cinch (uncredited)
- The Robe (1953) as Ship's Mate (uncredited)
- The Big Heat (1953) as Mark Reiner (uncredited)
- All the Brothers Were Valiant (1953) as George (uncredited)
- Flight to Tangier (1953) as Tirera
- The Wild One (1953) as Sage Valley race steward (uncredited)
- Beachhead (1954) as Maj. Scott
- Casanova's Big Night (1954) as Mounted Guard (uncredited)
- Executive Suite (1954) as Detective (uncredited)
- River of No Return (1954) as Man in Saloon (uncredited)
- The Forty-Niners (1954) as Ernie Walker
- The Far Country (1954) as Miner who spills gold dust (uncredited)
- Return from the Sea (1954) as Jimmy
- The Last Time I Saw Paris (1954) as Campbell
- Cry Vengeance (1954) as Red Miller
- Destry (1954) as Cowhand
- There's No Business Like Show Business (1954) as Stage Manager (uncredited)
- Prince of Players (1955) as Man Who Starts Clapping (uncredited)
- New York Confidential (1955) as Shorty
- An Annapolis Story (1955) as Boxing Coach
- The Sea Chase (1955) as Bos'n
- House of Bamboo (1955) as Skipper (uncredited)
- Seven Cities of Gold (1955) as Juan Coronel
- The Bottom of the Bottle (1956) as Patrolman (uncredited)
- Red Sundown (1956) as Billy—Wagon Guard (uncredited)
- Ghost Town (1956) as Doc Clawson
- Quincannon, Frontier Scout (1956) as Sgt. Calvin
- The Maverick Queen (1956) as Loudmouth
- The Fastest Gun Alive (1956) as Ben Buddy
- Dakota Incident (1956) as Rick Largo
- Thunder Over Arizona (1956) as Deputy Rand
- The Burning Hills (1956) as Bartender (uncredited)
- The True Story of Jesse James (1957) as Sheriff Hillstrom
- Last of the Badmen (1957) as Johnson
- The Big Land (1957) as Hagan – Livery Stableman (uncredited)
- The Phantom Stagecoach (1957) as Harry Farrow
- The Lawless Eighties (1957) as Art 'Pig' Corbin
- The Lonely Man (1957) as Sundown Whipple
- The Crooked Circle (1957) as Larry Ellis
- Bombers B-52 (1957) as Nielson (uncredited)
- Sabu and the Magic Ring (1957) as Kimal (stable master)
- Kiss Them for Me (1957) as Shore Patrol Lieutenant (uncredited)
- Peyton Place (1957) as Army Sergeant (uncredited)
- Gunfire at Indian Gap (1957) as Loder
- Too Much, Too Soon (1958) as Crowley (uncredited)
- Gang War (1958) as Maxie Meadows
- The Hunters (1958) as Chief Master Sergeant (uncredited)
- A Nice Little Bank That Should Be Robbed (1958) as Grayson (uncredited)
- Here Come the Jets (1959) as Randall
- Cleopatra (1963) as Achillas
- 7 Faces of Dr. Lao (1964) as Lucas
- The Sons of Katie Elder (1965) as Hyselman (undertaker)
- Paradise, Hawaiian Style (1966) as Mr. Belden
- Nevada Smith (1966) as Uncle Ben McCanles
- Winchester 73 (1967, TV Movie) as Jake Starret
- The Fastest Guitar Alive (1967) as Max
- Alexander the Great (1968, TV Movie) as Kleitos
- Journey to Shiloh (1968) as Gen. Braxton Bragg
- True Grit (1969) as Sheriff
- Patton (1970) as Major General Lucian K. Truscott
- One More Train to Rob (1971) as Sheriff Monte
- Big Jake (1971) as Buck Duggan (Head Texas Ranger)
- One Little Indian (1973) as Sgt. Waller
- The Last of the Mohicans (1975, TV Movie) as Chingachgook (voice)
- Fighting Mad (1976) as Jeff Hunter
- Charge of the Model T's (1977) as Captain Mundy
- The Time Machine (1978) as Sheriff Finley
- Every Girl Should Have One (1978) as Policeman
- Off the Mark (1987) as Jenell's men (final film role)

=== Television ===
- The Lone Ranger – episode – The Masked Rider – Dirk Nelson (1949)
- The Lone Ranger – episode – Gold Fever – Ox Martin (1950)
- The Lone Ranger – episode – Thieves' Money – Pierre Dumont (1950)
- The Lone Ranger – episode – Sheriff at Gunstock – Rocky Hanford (1950)
- The Lone Ranger – episode – The Hooded Men – Flack, Gang Leader (1951)
- Dick Tracy – episode – The Case of the Dangerous Dollars (1951)
- Racket Squad – episode – Accidentally on Purpose – Danny (1952)
- Dangerous Assignment – episode – The Perfect Alibi – Ratko (1952)
- The Roy Rogers Show – episode – Perils From the Past (1952)
- Adventures of Superman – episode – The Birthday Letter – Slugger (1952)
- The Lone Ranger – episode – Bandits in Uniform – Andrew Gage (1953)
- The Lone Ranger – episode – Rendezvous at Whipsaw – Henchman Kelso (1954)
- The Lone Ranger – episode – The Fugitive – Blaze (1954)
- Adventures of Superman – episode – Lady in Black – Joe (1954)
- The Lone Ranger – episode – Counterfeit Redskins – Beau Slate (1955)
- Adventures of Superman – episode – Clark Kent, Outlaw – Foster (1955)
- The Lone Ranger – episode – Trapped – Deputy Sawyer (1955)
- The Lone Ranger – episode – The School Story – Lew Cates (1955)
- Cheyenne – episode – Mountain Fortress – Sgt. Cap Daniels (1955)
- Science Fiction Theatre – episode – Barrier of Silence – Nielsen (1955)
- Science Fiction Theatre – episode – Target Hurricane – Col. Stewart (1955)
- Science Fiction Theatre – episode – The Long Sleep (1956)
- Treasury Men in Action – episode – The Case of the Black Sheep – Marty Hinton (1955)
- The Life and Legend of Wyatt Earp – episode – Wichita Is Civilized – Orry Taylor (1956)
- Cheyenne – episode – Town of Fear – Bill Jenkins (1957)
- Walt Disney's Wonderful World of Color – episode – The Saga of Andy Burnett: Andy's Initiation – Mountain man (uncredited) (1957)
- The True Story of Jesse James – Sheriff Hillstrom (1957)
- Tales of Wells Fargo – episode – Alder Gulch – Boone Helm (1957)
- Broken Arrow – episode – The Broken Wire – Bobo Conway (1957)
- Gunsmoke – episode – Liar from Blackhawk – Al Janes (1957)
- Richard Diamond, Private Detective – episode – The Torch Carriers – Corky(1957)
- Tombstone Territory as Geronimo (1958)
- Zorro – episode – Slaves of the Eagle – Antonio Azuela (uncredited) (1958)
- The Rough Riders – episode – The Murderous Sutton Gang – Wes Sutton (1958)
- Have Gun - Will Travel – episode – The O'Hare Story – Joe Marsh (1958)
- The Life and Legend of Wyatt Earp – episode – Little Brother – Smiley Dunlap (1958)
- Broken Arrow – episode – War Trail – Cagle (1958)
- The Thin Man – episode – Unlucky Lucky Number – Hank (1958)
- Official Detective "The Policeman's Bullet" – Longo Sardinia (1958)
- Steve Canyon – Colonel Dorrance – Season 1/Episode 4: "Project Heartbeat" (1958)
- U.S. Marshal – episode – Inside Job (1959)
- Bat Masterson – episode – Buffalo Kill – Luke Simes (1959)
- Have Gun - Will Travel – episode – Lady on the Stagecoach – Ed Rance (1959)
- Lock-Up – Lt. John Weston – 78 episodes (1959–1961)
- Bat Masterson – episode – A Grave Situation – Lemuel Carstairs (1960)
- Wagon Train – episode – The Jim Bridger Story – Gen. Jameson (1961)
- Wagon Train – episode – The Orly French Story – Marshal Jason Hartman (1962)
- Bonanza – Episode: "Knight Errant" (1962) – Walter Prescott
- Laramie – episode – Naked Steel – Sheriff Tate (1963)
- Wagon Train – episode – The Fort Pierce Story – Col. Wayne Lathrop (1963)
- Wagon Train – episode – The Michael McGoo Story – Michael McGoo (1963)
- The Lieutenant – episode – A Million Miles From Clary – GySgt Clintock (1963)
- Wagon Train – episode – Little Girl Lost – Boone Gilla (1964)
- Wagon Train – episode – The Ben Engel Story – Ben Engel (1964)
- Wagon Train – episode – The Isaiah Quickfox Story – Burt Enders (1965)
- Wagon Train – episode – The Chottsie Gubenheimer Story – Chandler Ames (1965)
- The Virginian – episode – The Awakening – Calder (1965)
- The Virginian – episode – Six Graves at Cripple Creek – Sheriff Goodbody (1965)
- Bonanza – Episode: "Devil on Her Shoulder" (1965) – Reverend Evan Morgan
- Rat Patrol – Episode: "The Deadly Double Raid" – Joe Marston (1966)
- Hogan's Heroes – episode – Some of Their Planes Are Missing – Colonel Richard Leman (1967)
- The Virginian – episode – Requiem for a Country Doctor – Lumberfield (1967)
- The Wild Wild West – episode – The Night of The Surreal McCoy (1967)
- Bonanza – Episode: "The Price of Salt" (1968) – Sid Talbott
- The Big Valley – episode – Devil's Masquerade (1968)
- Get Smart – episodes -The King Lives?, & To Sire, with Love: Parts 1 & 2 – Colonel Von Klaus (1968–1969)
- Here's Lucy – episode – Lucy and Mannix Are Held Hostage – Vernon (1971)
- The Partners – 20 episodes – Capt. Aaron William Andrews (1971–1972)
- Mannix – episode – Desert Run – Ward Gillis (1973)
- Kung Fu – episode – The Soul Is the Warrior – Ed Rankin (1973)
- Tenafly – episode – Man Running – Wilson (1974)
- Harry O – episode – Mortal Sin – Bishop Monaghan (1974)
- Kolchak: The Night Stalker – episode – Vampire – Officer Sample (1974)
- Ironside – episode – Mind for Murder – Ralph Hanson (1973)
- Greatest Heroes of the Bible – episode – Joshua and the Battle of Jericho – Reuben (1978)
- How the West Was Won – episode – The Slavers – Sheriff Boland (1979)
