= Bobby Ware Is Missing =

- Theayrical release poster
- Directed by: Thomas Carr
- Screenplay by: Daniel B. Ullman
- Produced by: Vincent M. Fennelly
- Starring: Neville Brand; Arthur Franz; Jean Willes; Walter Reed; Paul Picerni; Kim Charney
- Cinematography: Ellsworth Fredericks
- Edited by: Robert S. Eisen
- Music by: Carl Brandt
- Production company: Allied Artists Pictures
- Distributed by: Allied Artists Pictures
- Release date: October 23, 1955
- Running time: 67 minutes
- Country: United States
- Language: English

Bobby Ware Is Missing is a 1955 American crime film directed by Thomas Carr and written by Daniel B. Ullman. The film stars Neville Brand, Arthur Franz, Jean Willes, Walter Reed, Paul Picerni and Kim Charney. The film was released on October 23, 1955, by Allied Artists Pictures.

== Cast ==
- Neville Brand as Lt. Andy Flynn
- Arthur Franz as George Ware
- Jean Willes as Janet Ware
- Walter Reed as Max Goodwin
- Paul Picerni as Alfred Gledhill
- Kim Charney as Bobby Ware
- Thorpe Whiteman as Mickey Goodwin
- Peter Leeds as MacKay
