= 8th British Academy Film Awards =

1955 film awards ceremony

- Date: 10 March 1955
- Site: Odeon Leicester Square; London, England

Highlights
- Best Film: Le Salaire de la peur
- Best British Film: Hobson's Choice
- Most awards: The Divided Heart (3)
- Most nominations: Carrington V.C. (5)

The 8th British Academy Film Awards, given by the British Academy of Film and Television Arts in 1955, honored the best films of 1954.

== Winners and nominees ==
=== Best Film ===
The Wages of Fear (Le Salaire de la peur)

- The Caine Mutiny
- Carrington V.C.
- The Divided Heart
- Doctor in the House
- Executive Suite
- For Better, For Worse
- Hobson's Choice
- How to Marry a Millionaire
- Jigokumon
- The Maggie
- The Moon is Blue
- On the Waterfront
- Pane, amore e fantasia
- The Purple Plain
- Rear Window
- Riot in Cell Block 11
- Robinson Crusoe
- Romeo and Juliet
- Seven Brides for Seven Brothers

=== Best British Film ===
Hobson's Choice

- Carrington V.C.
- The Divided Heart
- Doctor in the House
- For Better, For Worse
- The Maggie
- The Purple Plain
- Romeo and Juliet

=== Best Foreign Actor ===
Marlon Brando in On the Waterfront

- José Ferrer in The Caine Mutiny
- Fredric March in Executive Suite
- James Stewart in The Glenn Miller Story
- Neville Brand in Riot in Cell Block 11

=== Best British Actor ===
Kenneth More in Doctor in the House

- David Niven in Carrington V.C.
- John Mills in Hobson's Choice
- Robert Donat in Lease of Life
- Maurice Denham in The Purple Plain
- Donald Wolfit in Svengali

=== Best British Actress ===
Yvonne Mitchell in The Divided Heart

- Margaret Leighton in Carrington V.C.
- Noelle Middleton in Carrington V.C.
- Brenda De Banzie in Hobson's Choice
- Audrey Hepburn in Sabrina

=== Best Foreign Actress ===
Cornell Borchers in The Divided Heart

- Judy Holliday in Phffft!
- Shirley Booth in About Mrs. Leslie
- Grace Kelly in Dial M for Murder
- Gina Lollobrigida in Pane, amore e fantasia

=== Best British Screenplay ===
The Young Lovers - George Tabori and Robin Estridge

- The Divided Heart - Jack Whittingham
- Doctor in the House - Nicholas Phipps
- Hobson's Choice - David Lean, Norman Spencer and Wynyard Browne
- The Maggie - William Rose
- Monsieur Ripois - Hugh Mills and René Clément
- The Purple Plain - Eric Ambler
- Romeo and Juliet - Renato Castellani

=== Best Documentary Film ===
The Great Adventure (Det Stora Ädventyret)

=== Most Promising Newcomer To Film ===
David Kossoff in The Young Lovers

- Maggie McNamara in The Moon Is Blue
- Eva Marie Saint in On The Waterfront

=== Best Animated Film ===
Árie prérie (Song of the Prairie, 1949)

- Little Brave Heart
- Power to Fly
- The Unicorn in the Garden

=== UN Award ===
The Divided Heart

=== Special Award ===
A Time Out of War

- The Living Desert
- The Drawings of Leonardo Da Vinci
- Axel Petersen
- The Origin of Coal
- Powered Flight: The Story of the Century
