= Sun Tan Ranch =

- Starring: Mildred Boyd; Austin McCoy; Eunice Wilson
- Production company: Norwanda Pictures
- Release date: 1948
- Country: United States
- Language: English

Sun Tan Ranch is a comedy western produced by Norwanda Pictures in 1948. Little is known about the film and its crew, not to mention whether a print of the film still exists. Like Norwanda's other 1948 production, No Time for Romance, the film featured an all-Black cast. It appears to have been shot in the summer of 1948 in Hollywood.

== Cast ==
- Mildred Boyd
- Byron & Beau
- Joel Fluellen
- Austin McCoy
- Bill Walker
- Eunice Wilson
