= Bill Walker (actor) =

American actor (1896–1992)

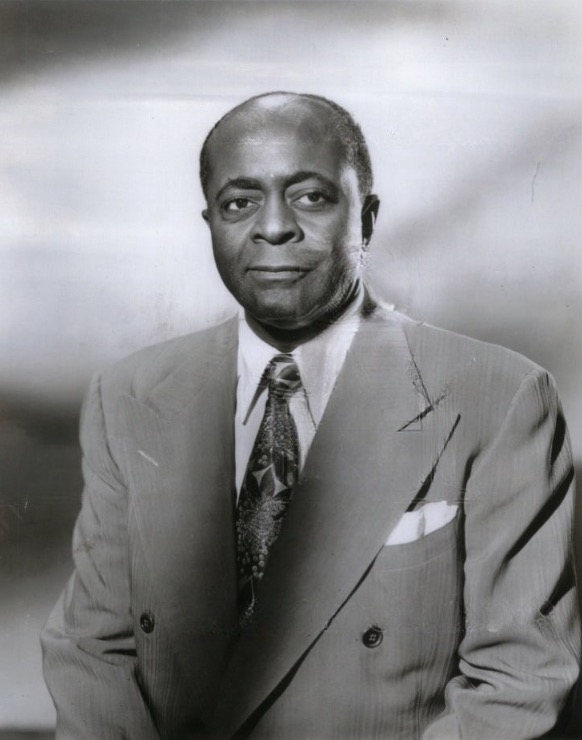
- Walker in 1951
- Born: William Franklin Walker; July 1, 1896; Pendleton, Indiana, U.S.
- Died: January 27, 1992 (aged 95); Woodland Hills, Los Angeles, California, U.S.
- Resting place: Riverside National Cemetery, Riverside, California
- Occupation: Actor
- Years active: 1946–1987
- Spouses: Hannah Robison Linden (m. 1953; div. 19??); Peggy Cartwright (m. 1959)

William Franklin Walker (July 1, 1896 – January 27, 1992) was an American television and film actor. Walker is best remembered for his role as Reverend Sykes in the 1962 film To Kill a Mockingbird.

== Career ==
Born in Pendleton, Indiana, Walker began his acting career in 1946. In a career that spanned five decades, Walker appeared in numerous television shows and films including Goodyear Television Playhouse, Raintree County, Yancy Derringer, Official Detective, The Amos 'n' Andy Show, Rawhide, The Untouchables, The Twilight Zone, Maverick, Columbo, Perry Mason, Daniel Boone, The Alfred Hitchcock Hour, Hunter, The Rockford Files, Mannix, Love, American Style, Mod Squad, Marcus Welby, M.D., The Green Hornet, Dr. Kildare, Profiles in Courage, Emergency!, Good Times, The Long, Hot Summer, To Kill a Mockingbird, Big Jake, What's Happening!!, Twilight's Last Gleaming, The President's Plane is Missing, Our Man Flint, Billy Jack Goes to Washington, Maurie, A Piece of the Action, The Girl Who Had Everything, The Wiz, and The Choirboys.

He was in the 1961 film The Mask, not to be confused with the Twilight Zone episode "The Masks" (1964), in which he also had an uncredited appearance.

== Personal life ==
On February 22, 1953, Walker married Hannah Robison Linden, a writer and civic worker in Los Angeles. On August 13, 1959, Walker married Canadian actress Peggy Cartwright, a member of the original silent Our Gang troupe.

== Death ==
Walker died of cancer on January 27, 1992. A World War I United States Army veteran, he is buried alongside his wife at Riverside National Cemetery in Riverside, California.

== Filmography ==
Year	Title	Role	Notes
1946	The Killers	Sam	Uncredited
1946	Three Little Girls in Blue	Captain of Waiters	Uncredited
1946	Swell Guy	Albert, Train Porter	Uncredited
1946	The Falcon's Adventure	Train Porter	Uncredited
1947	New Orleans	Mokey	Uncredited
1947	The Foxes of Harrow	Ty Demon	Uncredited
1948	I Wouldn't Be in Your Shoes	Prisoner	
1948	Canon City	Prisoner	
1948	Larceny	Butler	Uncredited
1948	When My Baby Smiles at Me	Porter	Uncredited
1948	Sun Tan Ranch		
1948	No Time for Romance	J.T. Richards	
1949	Bad Boy	Ollie, the Cook	Uncredited
1949	Africa Screams	Interpreter	Uncredited
1949	Sand	Sam	Uncredited
1949	Free for All	Herbert	
1949	Bomba on Panther Island	Luke	
1950	Young Man with a Horn	Black Minister	Uncredited
1950	Woman in Hiding	Porter	Uncredited
1950	Bright Leaf	Simon, Singleton's Butler	Uncredited
1950	Peggy	Porter	Uncredited
1950	Mrs. O'Malley and Mr. Malone	Pullman Porter	Uncredited
1951	Follow the Sun	Golf Club Waiter Lee	Uncredited
1951	Lightning Strikes Twice	The Nolans' Butler	Uncredited
1951	Francis Goes to the Races	Sam	Uncredited
1951	The Harlem Globetrotters	Professor Turner	
1951	Angels in the Outfield	Waiter on Train	Uncredited
1951	The Well	Dr. Billings	
1951	Anne of the Indies	British Club Servant	Uncredited
1951	The Family Secret	Larry	Uncredited
1952	Tarzan's Savage Fury	Native Chief	Uncredited
1952	Lydia Bailey	General LaPlume	
1952	Wait till the Sun Shines, Nellie	Robert Waverly Ferris aka Trooper	
1952	The Story of Will Rogers	Train Porter	Uncredited
1952	Night Without Sleep	Henry	Uncredited
1952	Bloodhounds of Broadway	Uncle Old Fella	Uncredited
1952	Bomba and the Jungle Girl	The Wards' Headman	
1952	Stars and Stripes Forever	Train Porter	Uncredited
1952	Ruby Gentry	Bartender	Uncredited
1953	The Mississippi Gambler	Dureau Butler	Uncredited
1953	The I Don't Care Girl	Cook	Uncredited
1953	Jungle Drums of Africa	Chief Douanga	Serial
1953	The Girl Who Had Everything	Julian	
1953	Bright Road	Jake Young, C.T.'s Father	Uncredited
1953	Jamaica Run	Human	
1953	Cry of the Hunted	Dock Attendant	Uncredited
1953	Rebel City	William	
1953	The President's Lady	Uncle Alfred	Uncredited
1953	Sangaree	Priam	
1954	The Golden Idol	Nadji	
1954	The Gambler from Natchez	Rivage's Butler	Uncredited
1954	The Outcast	Sam Allen	
1954	Killer Leopard	Jonas	Uncredited
1955	Prince of Players	Old Ben	
1955	A Man Called Peter	The Whiting's Butler	Uncredited
1955	The Far Horizons	Tom (servant)	Uncredited
1955	The Big Knife	Russell	
1955	The View from Pompey's Head	Pullman Porter	Uncredited
1955	Queen Bee	Sam	Uncredited
1955	I'll Cry Tomorrow	Porter	Uncredited
1955	Good Morning, Miss Dove	Henry	Uncredited
1956	A Kiss Before Dying	Bill, the Butler	
1956	You Can't Run Away from It	Norville, the Butler	
1956	Everything But the Truth	Waiter	Uncredited
1957	Raintree County	Old George	Uncredited
1958	The Long, Hot Summer	Lucius	
1958	Hot Spell	Attendant	Uncredited
1958	Ride a Crooked Trail	Jackson	
1958–1959	Yancy Derringer	Obadiah	7 episodes
1959	The Mating Game	Servant	Uncredited
1959	Porgy and Bess	Undertaker	
1959	Take a Giant Step	Frank, the Bartender	
1959	Perry Mason	Watchman	Season 3 Episode 4: "The Case of the Blushing Pearls"
1960	Maverick	Museum Attendant	Season 3 Episode 24: "The Resurrection of Joe November"
1961	The Big Bankroll	Bartender	Uncredited
1961	Ada	William, Servant	Uncredited
1961	Boy Who Caught a Crook	Keeper	
1962	Walk on the Wild Side	Black Man	(scenes deleted)
1962	To Kill a Mockingbird	Reverend Sykes	Uncredited
1962	Rawhide	Sandy	Season 4 Episode 14: "The Captain's Wife"
1962	The Untouchables	Porter	Season 4 Episode 6: "Bird in the Hand"
1962	What Ever Happened to Baby Jane?	Deliveryman	(scenes deleted)
1963	Wall of Noise	Money	
1963	4 for Texas	Attendant	Uncredited
1964	Kisses for My President	Joseph	
1964	Hush...Hush, Sweet Charlotte	Chauffeur	
1964	The Alfred Hitchcock Hour	William	Season 2 Episode 29: "Bed of Roses"
1964	The Twilight Zone	Jeffrey	Season 5 Episode 25: "The Masks" (uncredited)
1964	Profiles in Courage	Joseph	Season 1 Episode 3: "Thomas Hart Benton"
1965	The Third Day	Logan	
1966	Our Man Flint	American Diplomat	
1966	Dimension 5	Slim	
1966	The Green Hornet	Bartender	Season 1 Episode 11: "The Hunters and the Hunted"
1966	Dr. Kildare	Tad	(1) Season 5 Episode 39: "Gratitude Won't Pay the Bills" (2) Season 5 Episode 41: "These Hands That Heal"
1966	Daniel Boone	Perrault	Season 3 Episode 14: "When a King Is a Pawn"
1967	The Last Challenge	Joey Moon Eagle, Servant	Uncredited
1968	Three Guns for Texas	Ulmer Applin	Uncredited
1968	Uptight	Bartender	Uncredited
1968–1970	Mod Squad	Rollie	(1) Season 1 Episode 4: "When Smitty Comes Marching Home" (1968) (2) Season 3 Episode 5: "The Song of Willie" (1970)
1969	Riot	Jake	
1969	A Dream of Kings	Kampana	
1970	...tick...tick...tick...	John Sawyer	
1970	The Great White Hope	Deacon	
1970	Marcus Welby, M.D.	Donald	Season 1 Episode 15: "The Soft Phrase of Peace"
1971	Big Jake	Moses Brown	
1971–1974	Mannix	(1) Bartender (2) Martin Johnson	(1) Season 5 Episode 1: "Dark So Early, Dark So Long" (1971) (2) Season 7 Episode 22: "A Question of Murder" (1974)
1973	Maurie	Stokes	
1974	Lost in the Stars		
1976	Chesty Anderson, USN	Texas Oil Man	
1976	The Rockford Files	Rosie	Season 2 Episode 14: "The Hammer of C Block"
1977	Twilight's Last Gleaming	Willard	
1977	Billy Jack Goes to Washington	Security Guard	
1977	A Piece of the Action	Clair Hurst	
1977	The Choirboys	Tilden	
1977	Emergency!	Musician	Season 6 Episode 24: "All Night Long"
1978	The Wiz	The Wiz Singers Adult Choir	Voice, Uncredited
1987	Hunter	(1) Grandfather (2) Sporty's Grandfather	(1) Season 3 Episode 17: "Any Second Now" (2) Season 4 Episode 10: "Hot Prowl"
