= No Time for Romance =

- Directed by: Corney Cook
- Written by: Vivian Cosby
- Produced by: Byron O. Anderson
- Starring: Eunice Wilson; Bill Walker; Austin McCoy
- Cinematography: Paul Cantonwine
- Music by: Austin McCoy
- Release date: 1948
- Running time: 70 minutes
- Country: USA
- Language: English
- Budget: $60,000

No Time for Romance is a 1948 musical directed by Corney Cook. The film was noted for having an all-Black cast and for being one of the few all-Black films to be filmed in color during the era.

== Plot ==
A struggling L.A. nightclub performer (Eunice Wilson) and bandleader (Austin McCoy) have a shot at success with their new song, "A Lovely Day."

== Cast ==
- Eunice Wilson as Cynda Drake
- Bill Walker as J.T. Richards
- Austin McCoy as Ted Wayne
- Shirley Haven as Marie Gerald
- Joel Fluellen as Drums Miller
- Mildred Boyd as Barbara Gerald
- Jay Brooks as Lefty
- DeForest Covan as Charlie Byron Ellis
- Byron Ellis and Louise Franklin as Byron and Beau Dance Team
- Ray Martin as Ringer Gordon

== Production ==
Shot in Burbank, California, for a budget of around $60,000, No Time for Romance was intended to be the first feature of six produced by Norwanda Pictures, a motion picture company owned and operated by Black filmmakers. However, it appears that the company folded shortly after making No Time for Romance, although the 1948 western Sun Tan Ranch—which features many of the same actors—appears to also have been a Norwanda Pictures production.

== Release ==
The film showed in a few Black theaters in Los Angeles but was mostly forgotten about until the producer's daughter discovered the film in the family attic in 1983. The film was released on VHS in 1991.
