= Hero's Island =

1962 film by Leslie Stevens

- Film poster by Frank McCarthy
- Directed by: Leslie Stevens
- Written by: Leslie Stevens
- Produced by: James Mason; Leslie Stevens
- Starring: James Mason; Neville Brand; Kate Manx; Rip Torn; Warren Oates; Brendan Dillon
- Cinematography: Ted D. McCord
- Edited by: Richard K. Brockway
- Music by: Dominic Frontiere
- Production company: Daystar Productions
- Distributed by: United Artists
- Release date: September 16, 1962
- Running time: 94 minutes
- Country: United States
- Language: English

Hero's Island, also known as The Land We Love, is a 1962 American action film written and directed by Leslie Stevens. It stars James Mason, Neville Brand, Kate Manx, Rip Torn, Warren Oates and Brendan Dillon. It was released on September 16, 1962, by United Artists.

The film, set in the early 18th century, is about a poor family homesteading on a remote Carolina island, leading to encounters with seagoing vagabonds, good and bad. The film's producers used California's Santa Catalina Island, which is hillier, rockier and more arid than South Carolina or any actual part of the coastal Carolinas.

== Plot ==
In 1718 a recently freed family of indentured workers inherits the small uninhabited Bull Island off the Carolina coast. The family consist of husband and wife, one son, and a second son who they bought as a baby. The local fishermen who were already using the island think they own the island and attempt to force the family to leave, during which the husband is killed. The conflict over the island escalates as more people including a castaway, a fugitive from justice, and hired heavies join each side. Not everyone is who they seem or claim to be.

== Cast ==
- James Mason as Jacob Weber
- Neville Brand as Kingstree
- Kate Manx as Devon Mainwaring
- Rip Torn as Nicholas Gates
- Warren Oates as Wayte Giddens
- Brendan Dillon as Thomas Mainwaring
- Dean Stanton as Dixey Gates
- Robert Sampson as Enoch Gates
- Morgan Mason as Cullen
- Darby Hinton as Jafar
- John Hudkins as Bullock
- Bobby Johnson as Pound
- William Hart as Meggett
