= The Divided Heart =

1954 British film by Charles Crichton

- The Divided Heart UK release poster
- Directed by: Charles Crichton
- Written by: Jack Whittingham; Richard Hughes
- Produced by: Michael Truman
- Starring: Cornell Borchers; Yvonne Mitchell; Armin Dahlen; Alexander Knox
- Cinematography: Otto Heller
- Edited by: Peter Bezencenet
- Music by: Georges Auric
- Production company: Ealing Studios
- Distributed by: General Film Distributors; Republic Pictures (US)
- Release dates: 9 November 1954 (UK); 11 August 1955 (US)
- Running time: 89 minutes
- Country: United Kingdom
- Language: English

The Divided Heart is a 1954 British black-and-white drama film directed by Charles Crichton and starring Cornell Borchers, Yvonne Mitchell and Armin Dahlen. The film is based on a true story of a child, whose father was a member of Slovenian Partisans executed by Nazis and whose mother was deported to the Auschwitz concentration camp, while little Ivan was, like other 300 babies and young children from Slovenia, whose parents were declared Banditen by Nazis, sent to Germany in a Nazi program known as Lebensborn.

It was made at Ealing Studios with sets designed by the art director Edward Carrick. Location shooting took place around St. Johann in Tirol in Austria. The script was written by Jack Whittingham and Richard Hughes. It was produced by Michael Truman and edited by Peter Bezencenet, with cinematography by Otto Heller and music by Georges Auric. The Divided Heart was widely admired, and won three British Academy Film Awards.

Crichton said he was "deeply emotionally involved with" the film which he said "just about broke even."

== Plot ==
During the Second World War, a three-year-old boy is found wandering alone in Germany. No family can be traced, and it is presumed that his parents and siblings have been casualties of war. The child is placed in an orphanage, from where he is subsequently adopted by a childless couple, whom he grows to love and accept as his parents. When the boy is 10 years old, his natural mother is found alive in Yugoslavia where she has survived the war as a refugee. She travels to Germany to claim her child, having lost her husband and two other children in the war. The film focuses on the moral dilemma of the situation: should the child remain with the adoptive parents who have given him a loving and happy home, or be returned to his natural mother who has lost everything else, and to what extent should the child's own wishes be taken into account? The case is finally referred to a three-man court, who will decide the child's future. As in the true story on which the film is based, he is returned to his biological mother.

== Cast ==
- Cornell Borchers as Inga
- Yvonne Mitchell as Sonja
- Armin Dahlen as Franz
- Alexander Knox as Chief Justice
- Geoffrey Keen as Marks
- Liam Redmond as first Justice
- Eddie Byrne as second Justice
- Theodore Bikel as Josip
- Pamela Stirling as Mlle. Poncet
- Michel Ray as Toni (aged 10)
- Martin Stephens as Hans
- André Mikhelson as Professor Miran
- John Schlesinger as the ticket collector
- Richard Molinas as Herr Pieter
- Krystyna Rumistrzewicz as Mitzi
- Mark Gübhard as Max
- John Welsh as Chief Marshall
- Alec McCowen as reporter
- Marianne Walla as Matron
- Guy Deghy as schoolteacher
- Philo Hauser as schoolteacher
- Carl Duering as postman

== Production ==
The film was made through Ealing Studios, financed by the Rank Organisation.

== Reception ==
The Monthly Film Bulletin wrote: "From a real-life story of ready emotional appeal, the director Charles Crichton and his writer Jack Whittingham have made a film notable first of all for its sincerity, its evident response to the material. ... this likeable and sometimes impressive film can be saluted as a British drama welcomely unafraid of an emotional response to an emotional situation."

Kine Weekly wrote: "Heart-searing, yet intelligent and tremendously provocative weepie, set in a picturesque Bavarian village. ... The leading players, fully conscious of their responsibilities, seldom miss a trick, and atmosphere is impeccable. A profound human document and undoubted woman's film, it should, despite its lack of big stars, carn wide approbation."

Variety wrote: "At no time does the script measure up to the real heartache of the actual incident and there is rarely more than a superficial approach to this postwar problem. The cast is more than adequate, however, and Comell Borchers and Yvonne Mitchell give stirring performances as. the two mothers involved In 'the dilemma. Armin Dahlen is not too convincing as the other foster parent but Alex ander Knox is always dignified as ihe chief justice."

In The New York Times, critic Bosley Crowther wrote: "This is a bleak, heart-rending problem, as it is finely presented in this film with exceptionally sensitive understanding and scrupulous integrity. And the fact that it cannot be unraveled to the satisfaction of all... is simply an indication that a happy solution is beyond the power of a man as wise as Solomon – or even the author of the script – to hit upon."

== Accolades ==
The Divided Heart was nominated in six categories at the 1955 British Academy Film Awards and won three, with Mitchell being named Best British Actress and Borchers picking up the Best Foreign Actress award. Separate awards for British and foreign actresses were given between 1952 and 1967, after which they were combined, and this was the only year in which both awards were won by actresses in the same film. The film also won the BAFTA United Nations Award. It received nominations in the Best Film and Best British Film categories, and Whittingham was nominated for Best British Screenplay. In the U.S., The Divided Heart was named among the top five foreign films at the 1955 National Board of Review Awards.
