= Stanley Farrar =

American actor (1910–1974)

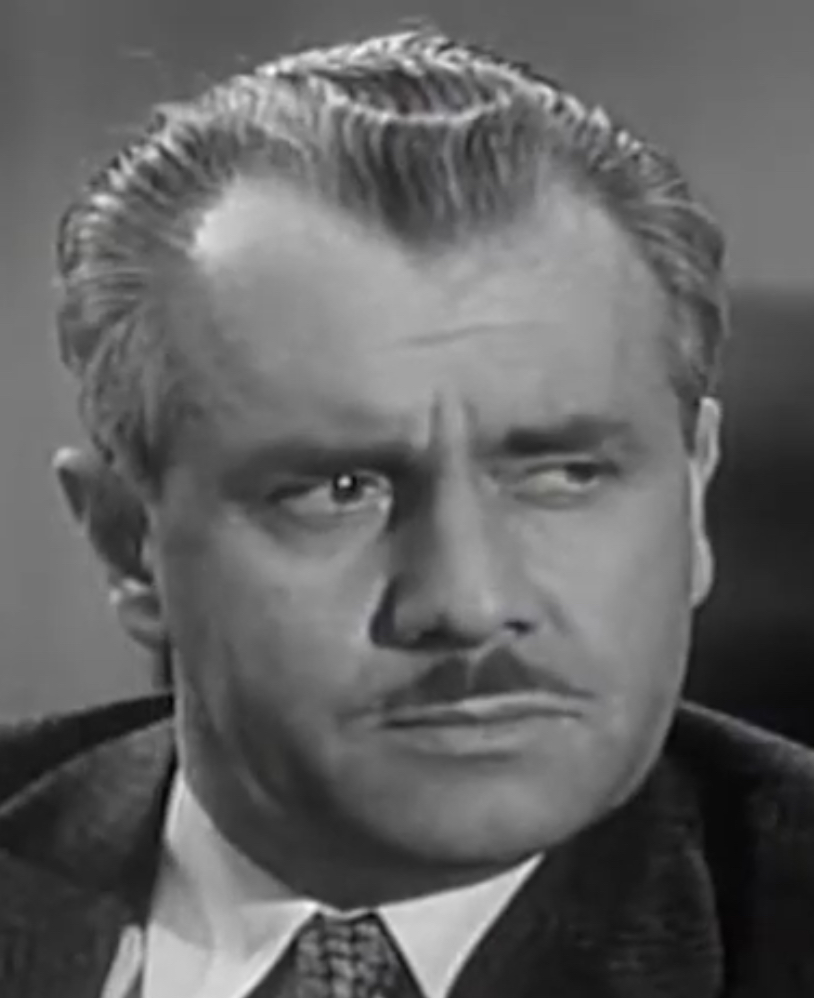
- Farrar in an episode of The Public Defender (1955)
- Born: Stanley Wendell Farrar; October 4, 1910; Berkeley, Alameda County, California, U.S.
- Died: April 5, 1974 (aged 63); Fort Bragg, Mendocino County, California, U.S.
- Education: University of California, Berkeley
- Occupation: Actor
- Years active: 1937–1965
- Known for: The Great Gildersleeve
- Spouse(s): Margaret Mary Klink m. 1936

Stanley Wendell Farrar (October 4, 1910 – April 5, 1974) was an American character actor in radio, film and television, perhaps best known as Mayor Terwilliger in the old time radio series The Great Gildersleeve. He was also the co-star and narrator of the 1953 adventure film, Perils of the Jungle, starring animal trainer/circus owner Clyde Beatty.

== Early life and career ==
A native of Berkeley, California, Farrar was one of three children born to Wendell Dale Farrar and Alma Carmin Boettiger. He attended University of California, Berkeley, and later the Faucit School of the Theatre in Oakland, a school founded and directed by London-born actress and director Ursula Faucit, the grandniece of actress Helena Faucit. From 1930 to 1936, Farrar was regularly featured in the school's on-air outlet, the dramatic anthology series, The Faucit Theatre of the Air, at least one episode of which he also wrote, adapting J. S. Coyne's one-act comedy, One Night of Terror. He was also featured opposite the school's director on at least two occasions. In 1930 they co-starred in Faucit's own play, Not the Type, and in 1935 Faucit was Bea to Farrar's Benedick in Shakespeare's Much Ado About Nothing. The Faucit Theatre Players also performed live on occasion, such as their 1935 production of Schiller's Mary Stuart—with Farrar's portrayal of Lord Burleigh deemed "extremely good" by the Oakland Tribune—and their 1934 revival of Elmer Greensfelder's Broomsticks, Amen, of which the Tribune's Wood Soanes wrote:

Here is the stuff of which high tragedy is made, but Greensfelder succeeded in evolving only obvious melodrama. The fine performance by Stanley Farrar as Hoffnagel was the saving grace of the show. He pulled 'Broomsticks, Amen' along with a performance that was more professional than amateur, sincere, powerful, well balanced and acute.

Beginning on October 4, 1937, Farrar appeared with Howard Duff, Jack Edwards, Marjorie Smith and Herb Allen in the Mutual Broadcasting serial The Phantom Pilot. The show aired for 2 weeks as a "sustaining" series before being sponsored by Young and Rubicam.

In the spring of 1949, The Hollywood Reporter noted that Farrar had begun publishing The 24 Sheet, a news bulletin for actors.

On August 26, 1953, Hollywood Citizen-News entertainment writer Zuma Palmer drew readers' attention to an uncommon occurrence: at a time when the prohibition of prerecorded network radio dramas had only recently been lifted, both Farrar and co-star Marian Richman appeared on Dr. Christian and simultaneously on the transcribed series, Family Theater. Later that year, Farrar appeared onstage, co-starring with Lloyd Corrigan and Tommy Bernard—former radio son of Ozzie and Harriet and TV son of Charlie Ruggles—in Corrigan's play The Upper Room, staged as part of an event held to benefit St. Mark's Episcopal Church of Van Nuys.

In 1956, Farrar was elected treasurer, and, the following year, recording secretary of the American Federation of Television and Radio Artists.

== Personal life and death ==
From March 22, 1936 until his death, Farrar was married to fellow actor Margaret Mary "Margo" Klink, with whom he had three sons.

On April 4, 1974, while onstage at the Mendocino Arts Center, portraying Orgon in Molière's Tartuffe, Farrar suffered a heart attack and collapsed. He died shortly thereafter at Mendocino Coast Hospital in Fort Bragg, survived by his wife, his sons, his mother and two brothers.

== Works ==
=== Radio ===
Approximate date(s)	Title	Role	Notes
1930 – 1936	The Faucit Theatre of the Air	Various, inc. Lord Byron, Vincentio in Shakespeare's Measure for Measure, and Police Chief Axford in Fran Striker's "Warner Lester, Manhunter"	Dramatic anthology series created by British-born actress and teacher Ursula Faucit and broadcast on KLX in Oakland.
1944	Michael Shayne, Private Detective; Ep. October 30		
1945	The Adventures of Maisie		
1946 – 1947	Conquest	Dr. Carson (Narrator)	
1948	Suspense; Ep. "The Last Chance"		
1947 – 1958	The Great Gildersleeve	Mayor Terwilliger	
1950, 1953	Dr. Christian; Eps. "The No Good" and "Baby's Choice"	Judge, Mr. Schuyler	
1952	The Railroad Hour; Ep. "Right Dress"	Admiral	Musical Comedy by Jerome Lawrence and Robert E. Lee, starring series host Gordon MacRae and Dorothy Warenskjold, with Lon McCallister, Sam Edwards, Herb Butterfield, and Kurt Martell.
1953	Family Theater; Ep. "The Wise Guy"	Logan	
1953	Stars over Hollywood; Ep. "Time for Christmas"	Dept. store Santa Claus	
Early 1960s	Horizons West		13-part AFRTS-commissioned series dramatizing the Lewis and Clark Expedition, starring Harry Bartell and John Anderson.

=== Partial filmography ===
- Fear in the Night (1946) – Bank patron (uncredited)
- The Lone Ranger
  - Ep. "Man of the House" (1950) – Casper Dingle
- Hard, Fast and Beautiful (1951) – Dr. Hopkins (uncredited)
- Racket Squad
  - EP. "The Case of the Vain Woman" (1951) – Dr. Mason
- Front Page Detective
  - Ep. "Troubles With Doubles" (1951)
  - Ep. "Twice Dead" (1951)
- The Adventures of Kit Carson
  - Ep. "Law of the Frontier" (1951) – Cleve Sadler (as Stanley Farrer)
- The Ruggles
  - Ep. January 3 (1952) – Ben Milligan
- Fireside Theatre
  - Ep. "The Haunted Wedding" (1952)
- Space Patrol
  - Ep. "Mission to Mercury" (1952) – Lennan
- Gang Busters
  - Ep. "The Dennis Case" (1952) – Wytherson
  - Ep. "The Unholy Three" (1952) – Grocery Manager
- Biff Baker, U.S.A.
  - "Mona Lisa" (1952) – Muller
- Perils of the Jungle (1953) – Grant Cunningham (narrator)
- The French Line (1953) – French Man (uncredited)
- Our Miss Brooks
  - Ep. March 12 (1954)
- Ford Theatre
  - Ep. "A Season to Love" (1954)
- Mr. District Attorney
  - Ep. September 4 (1954)
- Adolph Menjou's Favorite Stories
  - Ep. "The Lost Years" (1954)
- This Is the Life
  - Ep. "The Suspicious Heart" (1954) – Doctor
- Day of Triumph (1954) – Unknown role (uncredited)
- How to Be Very, Very Popular (1955) – Professor
- The Public Defender
  - Ep. "Clifford Pike" (1955)
- Stage 7
  - Ep. "Verdict" (1955)
- You Are There
  - Ep. "The Attack on Pearl Harbor" (1955)
- Tales of the Texas Rangers
  - Ep. "Home in San Antone" (1955)
  - Ep. "Grant and Lee at Appomattox" (1955)
- I'll Cry Tomorrow (1955) – Director
- Adventures of the Falcon
  - Ep. "Out of All Evil" (1955)
- Damon Runyon Theatre
  - Ep. "The Good Luck Kid" (1956)
- The Price of Fear (1956) – Dog track commissioner
- World in My Corner (1956) – Doctor
- The First Traveling Saleslady (1956) – Buyer
- Crossroads
  - Ep. "The Kid Had a Gun"
- Badlands of Montana (1957) – Rayburn
- The Unholy Wife (1957) – Warden
- Portland Exposé (1957) – Lennox
- Perry Mason
  - Ep. "The Case of the Substitute Face" (1958) – Accountant
- Never Steal Anything Small (1959) – Doctor
- Face of a Fugitive (1959) – Eakins
- Cheyenne
  - Ep. "Silent Witness" (1959)
- The Beatniks (1959) – Morrisey [sic] (as Stan Farrar)
- The Real McCoys
  - Ep. "The Insurance Policy" (1959) – Dr. Sloane
  - Ep. "The Diamond Ring" (1961)
- The Adventures of Ozzie and Harriet (1962)
  - Ep. "A Lamp for Dave and June"
- Inside Daisy Clover (1965) – Doctor (uncredited)
- Green Acres
  - Ep. "Lisa Has a Calf" (1965) – Dr. Filmore
  - Ep. "His Honor" (1967) – Judge Wilkins
  - Ep. "Who's Lisa" (1967) – Doctor
- Marriage on the Rocks (1965) – Assistant (uncredited)
