= Joel Fluellen =

American actor (1906–1990)

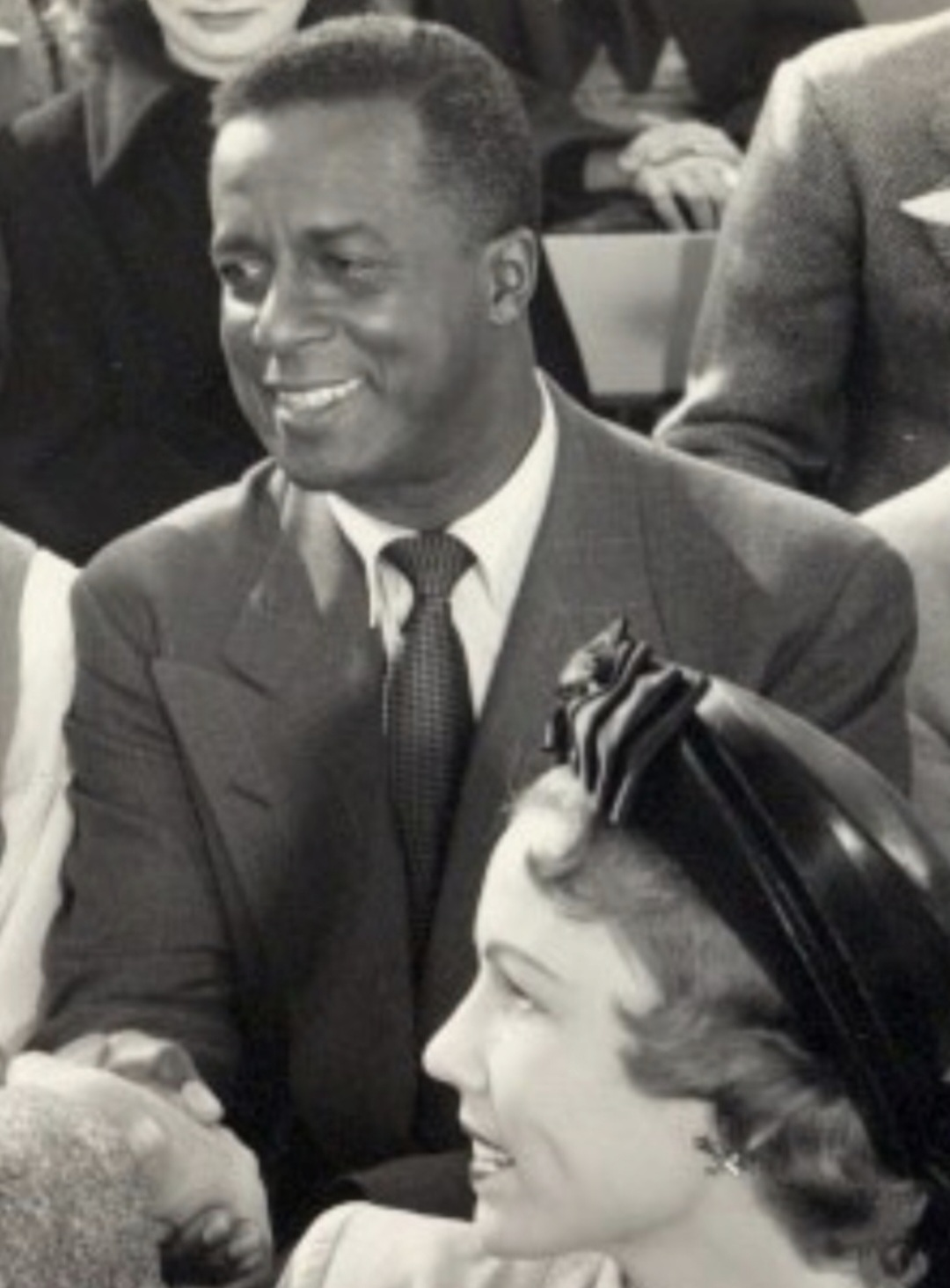
- Fluellen in The Jackie Robinson Story (1950)
- Born: December 1, 1907; Monroe, Louisiana, U.S.
- Died: February 2, 1990 (aged 82); Los Angeles, California, U.S.
- Occupation: Actor
- Years active: 1937–1979
- Known for: Opposing Black discrimination in Hollywood
- Notable work: The Jackie Robinson Story
- Awards: Paul Robeson Pioneer Awards

Joel Fluellen (December 1, 1907 – February 2, 1990) was an actor and an activist for the rights of African Americans. He appeared in the films The Jackie Robinson Story, Perils of the Jungle, Duffy of San Quentin, Sitting Bull, Friendly Persuasion, Monster from Green Hell, The Decks Ran Red, Porgy and Bess, A Raisin in the Sun, He Rides Tall, Roustabout, The Chase, The Learning Tree, The Great White Hope, Skin Game, Thomasine & Bushrod, The Bingo Long Traveling All-Stars & Motor Kings, Casey's Shadow and Butch and Sundance: The Early Days, among others.

== Cinema career ==
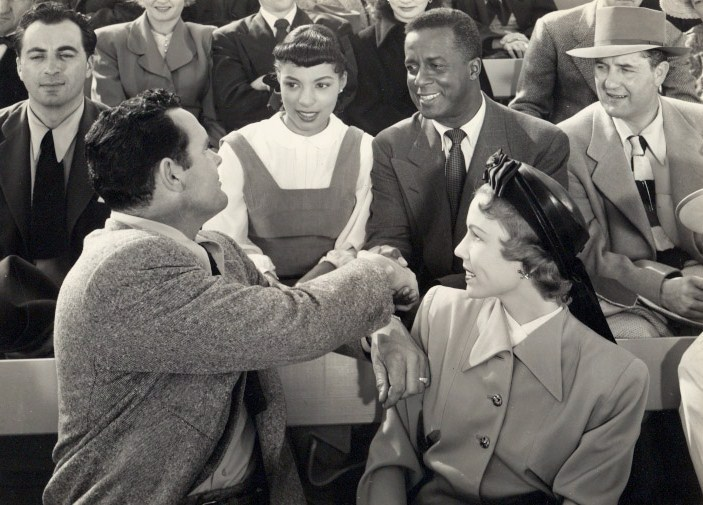
Ruby Dee and Joel Fluellen (center) in The Jackie Robinson Story (1950)

After getting a series of small roles, Fluellen attracted attention playing the role of Jackie Robinson's brother in The Jackie Robinson Story, released in 1950. Other significant roles followed in movies such as Friendly Persuasion, The Learning Tree and The Great White Hope.

He also appeared in television series, including The Dick Van Dyke Show and Hill Street Blues.

== Activism ==
Following calls by the National Association for the Advancement of Colored People against the stereotyping of African Americans in the film industry, Fluellen tried to get the Screen Actors Guild to protect their Black members against discrimination. The guild, headed by Ronald Reagan at the time, repeatedly rebuffed his resolutions, and Fluellen became an early member of the Negro Actors Guild of America.

With Frances Williams, he received the first Paul Robeson Pioneer Awards from the Black American Cinema Society, in 1985.

== Later life ==
Fluellen was gay. He suffered health problems and was becoming blind toward the end of his life. He shot and killed himself on February 2, 1990, at his home in Los Angeles, California.

== Selected filmography ==
- Dark Manhattan (1937) – Henchman (uncredited)
- Spirit of Youth (1938) – Kitchen Worker (uncredited)
- The Duke Is Tops (1938) – Tonic Customer (uncredited)
- Congo Maisie (1940) – Native (uncredited)
- While Thousands Cheer (1940) – Waiter (uncredited)
- The Flame of New Orleans (1941) – Servant (uncredited)
- Heart of the Golden West (1942) – Member – Hall Johnson Choir (uncredited)
- Happy Go Lucky (1943) – Trinidad Native (uncredited)
- Cabin in the Sky (1943) – Mr. Kelso / Jim Henry's Paradise Patron (uncredited)
- Hit the Ice (1943) – Club Car Bartender (uncredited)
- I Dood It (1943) – Member of Hazel Scott's Group (uncredited)
- Jungle Queen (1945, Serial) – Native (uncredited)
- Shady Lady (1945) – Dining Car Waiter (uncredited)
- White Pongo (1945) – Mumbo Jumbo
- This Love of Ours (1945) – Porter (uncredited)
- The Negro Sailor (1945)
- Without Reservations (1946) – Club Car Waiter (uncredited)
- Two Guys from Milwaukee (1946) – Porter (uncredited)
- The Burning Cross (1947) – Charlie West
- Family Honeymoon (1948) – Waiter (uncredited)
- Sun Tan Ranch (1948)
- No Time for Romance (1948) – Drums Miller
- Mighty Joe Young (1949) – Tall Native (uncredited)
- Rope of Sand (1949) – Native (uncredited)
- Buccaneer's Girl (1950) – Black Man in Marketplace (uncredited)
- The Jackie Robinson Story (1950) – Mack Robinson
- The Great Jewel Robber (1950) – Train Waiter (uncredited)
- Walk Softly, Stranger (1950) – Florist (uncredited)
- You're in the Navy Now (1951) – Officer's Club Waiter (uncredited)
- Tarzan's Peril (1951) – Attendant (uncredited)
- His Kind of Woman (1951) – Sam (uncredited)
- Lydia Bailey (1952) – Toussant's Aide (uncredited)
- Affair in Trinidad (1952) – Jeffrey Mabetes – Fisherman (uncredited)
- Jungle Drums of Africa (1953, Serial) – Matambo, Native Searcher [Ch.4]
- Perils of the Jungle (1953) – Kenny
- The Moonlighter (1953) – Black Man in Jail Cell (uncredited)
- The Royal African Rifles (1953) – Soldier
- Duffy of San Quentin (1954) – Bill Lake
- Riot in Cell Block 11 (1954) – Al
- Jungle Gents (1954) – Rangori – Witch Doctor (uncredited)
- Sitting Bull (1954) – Sam
- Seven Angry Men (1955) – Heyward – Harper's Ferry Station Master (uncredited)
- Lord of the Jungle (1955) – Molu (uncredited)
- Lucy Gallant (1955) – Summertime (uncredited)
- I'll Cry Tomorrow (1955) – The Porter (uncredited)
- Friendly Persuasion (1956) – Enoch
- The Opposite Sex (1956) – Club Car Bartender (uncredited)
- Oh, Men! Oh, Women! (1957) – Cab Driver (uncredited)
- Monster from Green Hell (1957) – Arobi
- House of Numbers (1957) – Ashlow – Convict (uncredited)
- Run Silent, Run Deep (1958) – Bragg (uncredited)
- The Decks Ran Red (1958) – Pete
- Imitation of Life (1959) – Minister
- Porgy and Bess (1959) – Robbins
- The Young Savages (1961) – Court Clerk (uncredited)
- A Raisin in the Sun (1961) – Bobo
- He Rides Tall (1964) – Dr. Sam
- Perry Mason (1964) - Bartender
- Good Neighbor Sam (1964) – Judge (uncredited)
- Roustabout (1964) – Cody Marsh
- The Chase (1966) – Lester Johnson
- Who's Minding the Mint? (1967) – Policeman (uncredited)
- Hang 'Em High (1968) – Williams (uncredited)
- Uptight (1968) – Kyle's associate (uncredited)
- The Learning Tree (1969) – Uncle Rob
- The Great White Hope (1970) – Tick
- Skin Game (1971) – Abram
- Columbo (1971) – Charles
- Ace Eli and Rodger of the Skies (1973) – Handyman (uncredited)
- Thomasine & Bushrod (1974) – Nathaniel
- Man Friday (1975) – Doctor
- The Bingo Long Traveling All-Stars & Motor Kings (1976) – Mr. Holland
- Casey's Shadow (1978) – Jimmy Judson
- Butch and Sundance: The Early Days (1979) – Jack the Bartender
