= The Lonely Man =

1957 film by Henry Levin

- Theatrical release poster
- Directed by: Henry Levin
- Screenplay by: Harry Essex; Robert Smith
- Produced by: Pat Duggan
- Starring: Jack Palance; Anthony Perkins; Neville Brand; Robert Middleton; Elisha Cook, Jr. Claude Akins; Lee Van Cleef
- Cinematography: Lionel Lindon
- Edited by: William B. Murphy
- Music by: Van Cleave
- Production company: Paramount Pictures
- Distributed by: Paramount Pictures
- Release date: June 21, 1957
- Running time: 88 minutes
- Country: United States
- Language: English

The Lonely Man is a 1957 American Western film directed by Henry Levin and written by Harry Essex and Robert Smith. The film stars Jack Palance, Anthony Perkins, Elaine Aiken, Neville Brand, Robert Middleton, Elisha Cook, Jr., Claude Akins and Lee Van Cleef. The film was released on June 21, 1957, by Paramount Pictures.

== Plot ==
Riley Wade hates his gunfighter father, Jacob, for deserting Riley's mother, who then committed suicide. Jacob rides to Red Bluff hoping to reconcile with his son, unaware that King Fisher holds a grudge and intends to shoot down Jacob, first chance.

Riley accompanies his father on the trail, after Jacob sets their family ranch ablaze, never letting him out of his sight. They go to the ranch where Jacob used to live with Ada Marshall, who takes them in, glad to see Jacob again. Jacob's sight, meantime, is fading; he is slowly going blind, a fact he hides from his son. Riley refuses to forgive his father until old friend Ben Ryerson explains to him that Jacob didn't desert his mother at all.

King comes to town with his men. Riley, aware for the first time of his father's failing vision, acts as his eyes in directing Jacob where to shoot. King's men die and he tries to sneak away, but he and Jacob end up in a showdown anyway and kill one another. Jacob dies in his son's arms.

== Cast ==
- Jack Palance as Jacob Wade
- Anthony Perkins as Riley Wade
- Neville Brand as King Fisher
- Elaine Aiken as Ada Marshall
- Robert Middleton as Ben Ryerson
- Elisha Cook, Jr. as Willie
- Claude Akins as Blackburn
- Lee Van Cleef as Faro
- Harry Shannon as Dr. Fisher
- James Bell as Judge Hart
- Adam Williams as Lon
- Denver Pyle as Brad
- John Doucette as Sundown Whipple
- Paul Newlan as Fence Green
- Tudor Owen as Mr. MacGregor
- Tennessee Ernie Ford as Singer

== Production ==
In April 1955 Hedda Hopper reported the script by Harry Essex and Robert Smith had been sold to Paramount; she described it as an "off beat character study" and suggested Bing Crosby might play the lead.

Filming started 2 April 1956. Anthony Perkins had made Friendly Persuasion and was being built into a star by Paramount. Assistant director Gene Nelson recalled "a lot of tension on the set. Everybody thought it was an important picture they were making. Most of the actors were from the method school but it was really Palance who was the macho act. He would go off and do push ups and run before every scene. People would stand around waiting for him to get ready and there was a lot of tension in the air."

== Reception ==
Variety called it "an offbeat western, more a character study of a gunfighter who tries to reform than an out-and-out action picture. Narrative carries certain interest and winds in a gun flourish when principal character is baited into one last battle." Filmink said the film "expects us to believe Jack Palance and Tony Perkins are father and son, and that Perkins is a cowboy."

The film was not a commercial success

== Notes ==
- Winecoff, Charles (1996). Split image : the life of Anthony Perkins. Dutton.
