= The Jackie Robinson Story =

1950 American biographical film

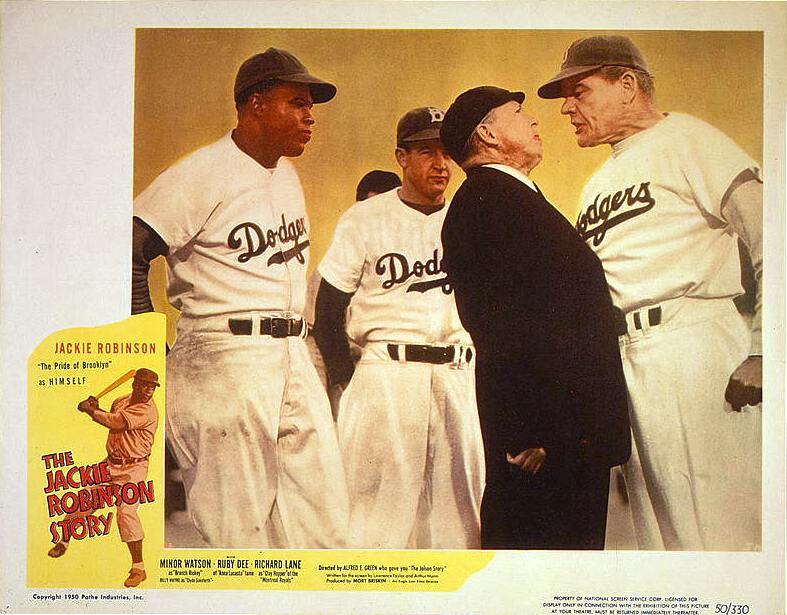
- Lobby card
- Directed by: Alfred E. Green
- Written by: Arthur Mann; Lawrence Taylor
- Produced by: Mort Briskin; William J Heineman (United Artists)
- Starring: Jackie Robinson; Ruby Dee; Minor Watson
- Cinematography: Ernest Laszlo
- Edited by: Arthur H. Nadel
- Music by: Herschel Burke Gilbert
- Production company: Jewel Pictures
- Distributed by: Eagle-Lion Films
- Release date: May 16, 1950 (United States)
- Running time: 77 minutes
- Country: United States
- Language: English
- Budget: $336,000

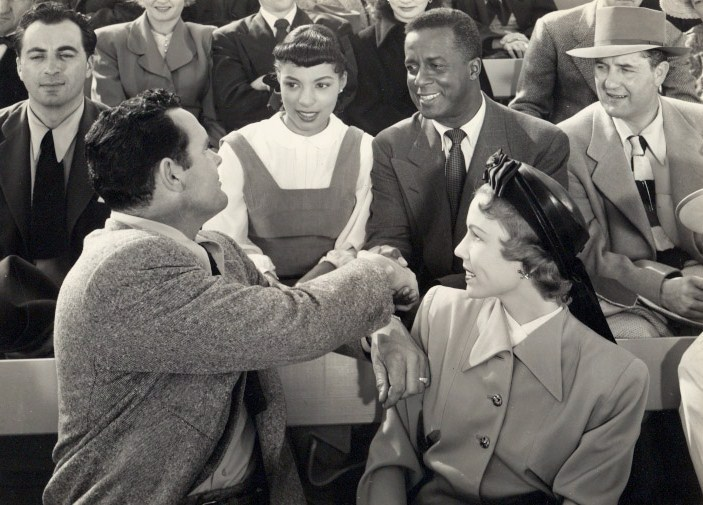
Ruby Dee and Joel Fluellen (center)

The Jackie Robinson Story is a 1950 biographical film directed by Alfred E. Green (who had directed The Jolson Story, "one of the biggest hits of the 40s") and starring Jackie Robinson as himself. The film focuses on Robinson's struggle with bigotry abuse as he becomes the first African-American Major League Baseball player of the modern era. The film is in part based on Robinson's own autobiography, My Own Story. The film is among the list of films in the public domain in the United States.

== Plot ==
The Jackie Robinson Story

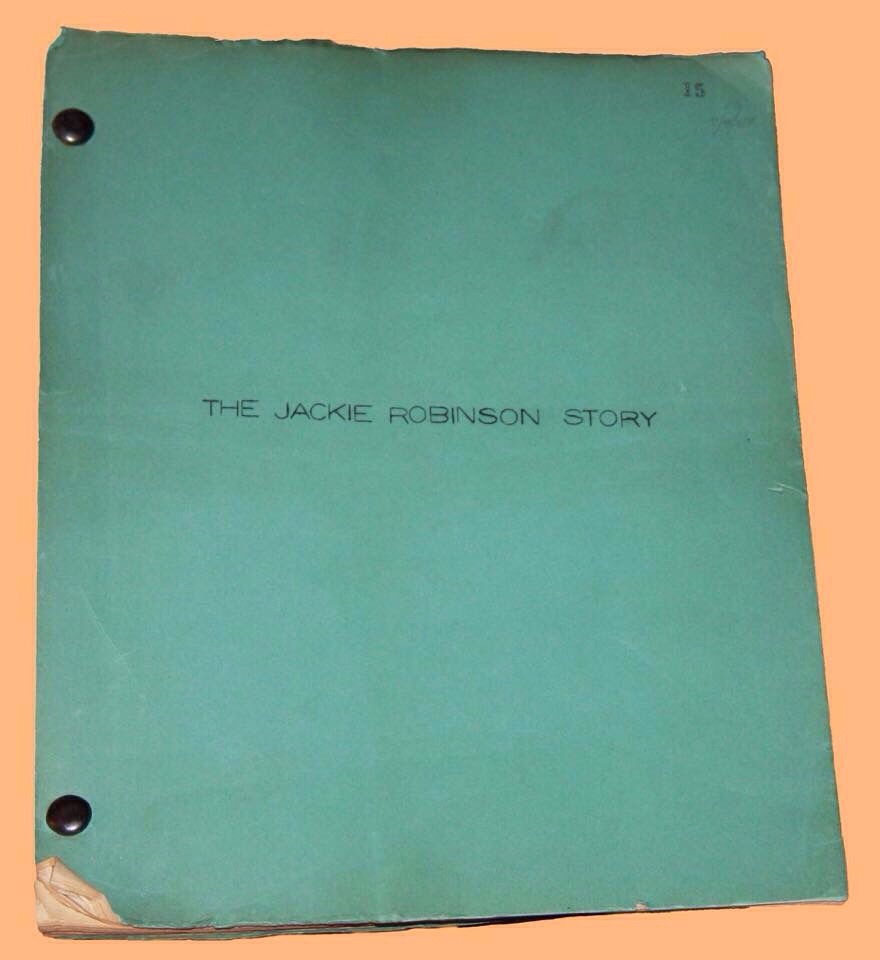
Screenplay cover

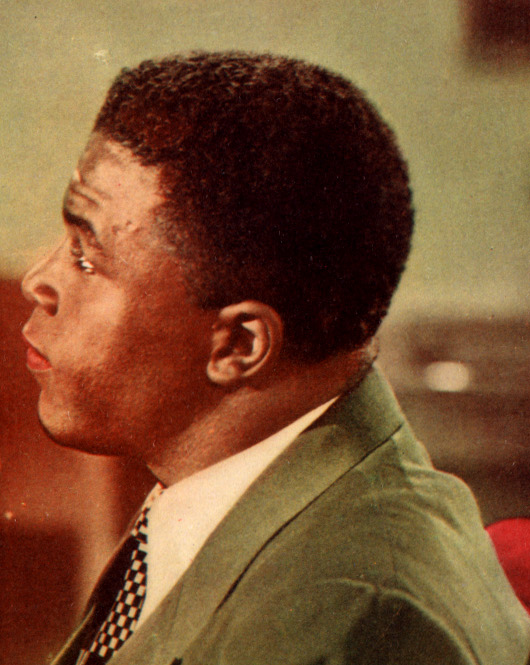
Photo from 1950 Lobby card promoting The Jackie Robinson Story, showing Jackie Robinson (as himself)

The film begins with Robinson as a boy. He is given a worn-out baseball glove by a stranger impressed by his fielding skills. As a young man, he becomes a multi-sport star at UCLA, but as he nears graduation, he worries about his future. His older brother Mack was also an outstanding college athlete and graduate, but the only job he could get was that of a street cleaner.

When America enters World War II, Robinson is drafted, serving as an athletic director. Afterward, he plays baseball with a professional African American team. However, the constant travel keeps him away from his college sweetheart.

Then one day, Brooklyn Dodgers scout Clyde Sukeforth invites him to meet Branch Rickey, president of the Major League Baseball team. At first, Robinson considers the offer to be a practical joke, as African Americans are not allowed to play in the segregated major leagues. When he is convinced that the opportunity is genuine, he and Rickey size each other up. After thinking over Rickey's warning about the hatred and abuse he would have to endure without being able to strike back, Robinson signs with the Dodgers' International League farm team, the Montreal Royals. Though he wants to delay marrying Rae to shield her, she insists on an immediate wedding so she can support her man in the trying times ahead.

Robinson leads the league in hitting in his first year, and despite the grave concerns expressed by the Commissioner of Major League Baseball, Rickey goes ahead and promotes him to the Dodgers. Reviled at first by many of the fans and some of his own teammates, Robinson gets off to a shaky start, playing out of position at first base and going through a hitting slump, but then gradually wins people over with his talent and determination. The team goes on to win the pennant, with Robinson driving in the tying run and scoring the winning run in the deciding game.

== Cast ==
- Jackie Robinson as Himself
- Ruby Dee as Rae Robinson
- Minor Watson as Branch Rickey
- Louise Beavers as Jackie's mother
- Richard Lane as Clay Hopper
- Harry Shannon as Frank Shaughnessy (listed as "Charlie" in the end credits)
- Ben Lessy as Shorty
- Bill Spaulding as Himself
- Billy Wayne as Clyde Sukeforth
- Joel Fluellen as Mack Robinson
- Bernie Hamilton as Ernie
- Kenny Washington as Tigers Manager
- Pat Flaherty as Karpen
- Larry McGrath as Umpire
- Jimmie Dodd as UCLA Scout
- Emmett Smith as Catcher
- Howard Louis MacNeely as Jackie as a boy
- George Dockstader as Bill
- Dick Williams as the Jersey City Pitcher

== Production ==
Principal photography for the film took place in the off-season following his third season with the Brooklyn Dodgers. Much of the film was shot at Gilmore Field, home of the PCL Hollywood Stars.

== Reception ==
Even during its initial release—in the era of racial segregation—the film received critical praise and fared well at the box office. The film was not as popular as originally thought but still profitable.

According to Bosley Crowther, "What is surprising... in this new film... is the sincerity of the dramatization and the integrity of Mr. Robinson playing himself. Too often, in films of this nature about sports figures, fanciful or real, the sentiments are inflated and the heroics glorified. Here the simple story of Mr. Robinson's trail-blazing career is re-enacted with manifest fidelity and conspicuous dramatic restraint. And Mr. Robinson, doing that rare thing of playing himself in the picture's leading role, displays a calm assurance and composure that might be envied by many a Hollywood star."

== Colorized version ==
On April 19, 2005, a colorized version of the film was released by 20th Century Fox and Legend Films. This version donated a portion of the proceeds to the Jackie Robinson Foundation, a charity that benefits education for gifted students. There is another official version, by Metro-Goldwyn-Mayer (whose sister company, United Artists, produced this film) which can be found on Amazon Prime Video.

== See also ==
- 42, a 2013 film also about Robinson
- List of baseball films
- List of United Artists films
