= Lewisburg micropolitan area =

The Lewisburg micropolitan area may refer to:

- The Lewisburg, Pennsylvania micropolitan area, United States
- The Lewisburg, Tennessee micropolitan area, United States

== See also ==
- Lewisburg (disambiguation)
