= Lewiston Airport =

Lewiston Airport may refer to:

- Lewiston-Nez Perce County Airport near Lewiston, Idaho, United States (FAA/IATA: LWS)
- Auburn/Lewiston Municipal Airport near Auburn and Lewiston, Maine, United States (FAA/IATA: LEW)

== See also ==
- Lewistown Municipal Airport, Lewistown, Fergus County, Montana, United States (FAA/IATA: LWT)
- Lewiston (disambiguation)
