= Oscar Lowande =

American circus performer (1877–1956)

- Born: Oscar Lowande; January 8, 1877; Pennsylvania, U.S.
- Died: May 19, 1956 (aged 78); New York City, New York, U.S.
- Occupations: Circus performer; circus proprietor
- Spouse: Mamie Lowande (née Gavin)
- Children: 1
- Awards: Circus Hall of Fame (1965)

Oscar Lowande (January 8, 1877 – May 19, 1956) was an American bareback rider, circus proprietor, and clown.

== Early life ==
Oscar Lowande was born in Pennsylvania, United States, on January 8, 1877.

He was the son of Martinho Lowande, who was a circus rider and show owner. Tracing back to his great-great-great-grandfather Alexander Lowande, a premier rider of the Royal Court circus of St. Petersburg in 1790, the family emigrated to the United States in the early 1830s and traveled with circuses from town to town at night.

== Career ==
Oscar began to ride when he was five years old. His first appearance in the circus arena was with his father, who taught him the tricks of bareback riding.

Lowande appeared on many titles and circus programs throughout the United States. Lowande appeared with the McMahon Bros. Circus in 1896. His weekly salary was eight dollars. During the 1897 season, he was part of the Great Wallace Shows program. He began performing with the Forepaugh-Sells Brothers' Circus in 1899. He and his wife, Mary Louise "Mamie" Gavin, an equestrian, were both members.

As a principal rider with the Forepaugh-Sells shows in 1903, he drew a $150 weekly salary and became the first to perform a backward somersault from horse to horse. That year, he was featured in a short film titled "Bareback Riding." Lowande's famous somersault is captured in the film.

By February 1907, he staged Oscar Lowande's Indoor Circus, billing himself as the "world-famous somersaulting bareback rider" and his wife as the "Queen of all Equestriennes." The program featured bareback riding, clowning, juggling, acrobatics, and traditional circus thrillers.

Later, he started Oscar Lowande's Old-Style One-Ring Circus in 1908 which became Oscar Lowande's Bay State Show for the 1909 season. Serving as equestrian director and rider, Lowande placed his Great Bay State Show in winter quarters at Reading, Massachusetts. While in Reading, he resided at 11 Beach Street.

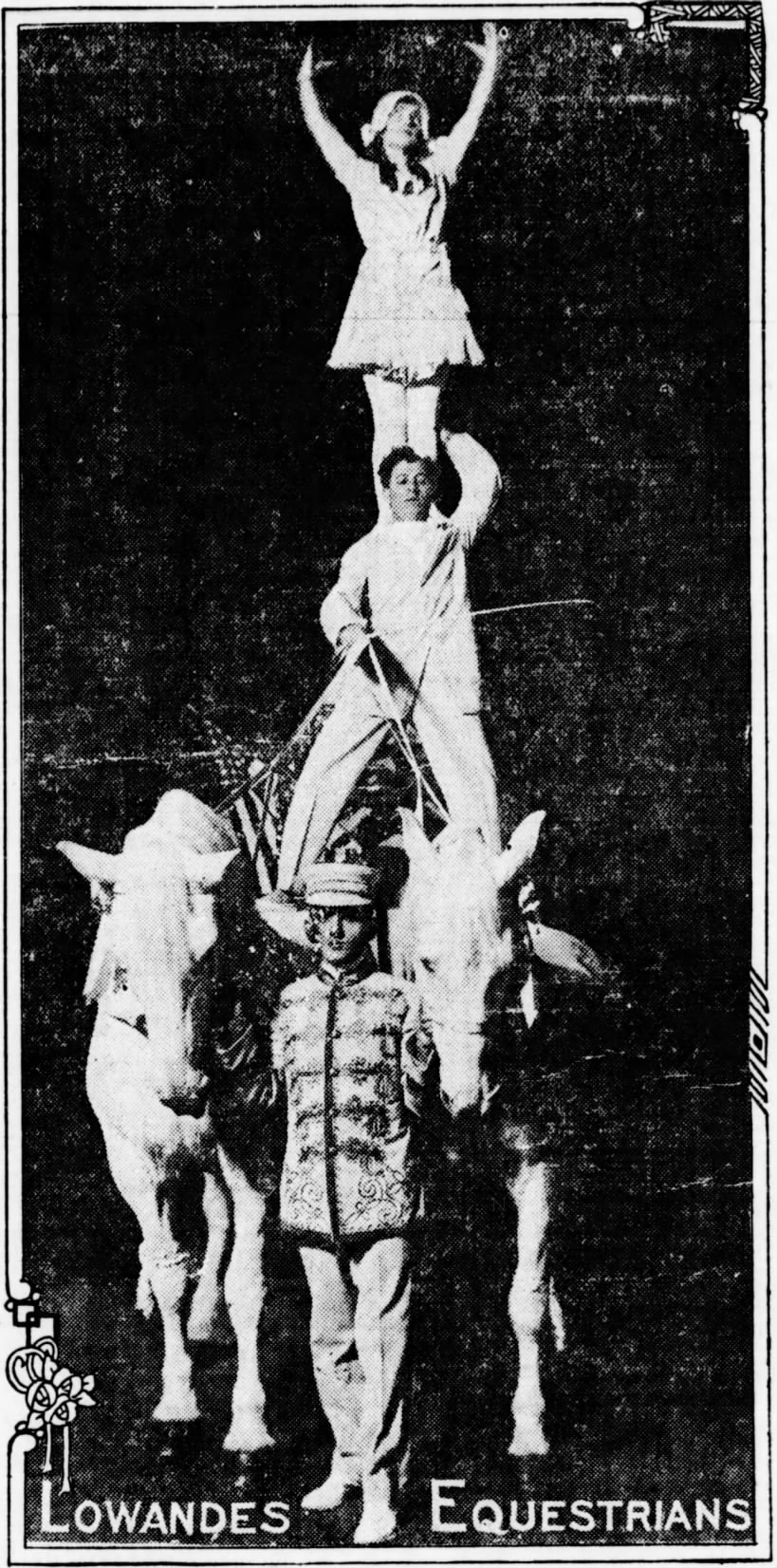
Oscar and Mamie Lowande's two-horse standing act in 1915.

After spring appearances with Keith's Hippodrome, an indoor circus, his act was featured with the Forepaugh-Sells Brothers Circus, managed by John Ringling during the summer of 1910.

During fall 1910, he joined a co-partnership aimed at launching an old-time wagon show in spring 1911. Circus proprietor Sig Sautelle secured a half share in Oscar Lowande's one-ring circus, with its paraphernalia sent from Reading to Homer, New York, that December. The Lowande family of eight were scheduled to join following their twelve-week run at the New York Hippodrome. Lowande collaborated with Sautelle and George Rollins on the new circus from 1911 to 1913. He held equal ownership in Sig. Sautelle's Nine Big Shows until being bought out by Sautelle halfway into the 1914 season.

He was part of the Hagenbeck–Wallace Circus from 1915 to 1917, along with the Lowande family. At the time, he held the reputation of being both the leading and most accomplished bareback rider in the circus profession.

He joined Sig Sautelle once more in May 1917 to present a 25-cent show.

In 1918, he visited Canada, performing his two-horse standing act with his wife Mamie Lowande at the Pantages Theatre in Calgary. He eventually arranged an attraction with eight separate acts called Oscar Lowande's Famous Equestrians. His circus appeared in Andover, Massachusetts on June 8, 1919.

He ended his riding career in the 1940s on account of age. He joined the Hunt Bros. Circus in June 1942, performing as a clown.

Lowande spent 1945 and 1946 with the Clyde Beatty Circus. He became a member of 'Clown Alley' at the Clyde Beatty Circus in the summer of 1948.

Near the latter end of 1949, he was hired as a clown with the Orrin Davenport shows. Lowande retired around 1953 and retired to New York City.

== Personal life ==
He had a son named Oscar Lowande Jr.

== Death ==
Oscar Lowande died on May 19, 1956, in New York City, New York, United States, at age 79.

== Legacy ==
He was the final Lowande, concluding a multi-generation circus legacy of over 150 years. He pioneered the feat of somersaulting from one running horse to another.

Oscar Lowande was inducted into the "Equestrian" category of the Circus Hall of Fame in 1965.
