= Lewiston metropolitan area =

The Lewiston metropolitan area may refer to:

- The Lewiston, Maine metropolitan area, United States
- The Lewiston, Idaho-Washington metropolitan area, United States

== See also ==
- Lewiston (disambiguation)
