= Louisburgh (disambiguation) =

Louisburgh may refer to:

- Louisburgh, County Mayo, Ireland
- Louisburgh, Wick, Caithness, Scotland

== See also ==
- Louisburg (disambiguation)
- Lewisburg (disambiguation)
