= List of shipwrecks in December 1822 =

The list of shipwrecks in December 1822 includes some ships sunk, foundered, wrecked, grounded, or otherwise lost during December 1822.

== 1 December ==
List of shipwrecks: 1 December 1822
Ship	State	Description
Assistance	United Kingdom	The ship was driven ashore and severely damaged at Dring, County Fermanagh.
Deux Frères	France	The ship collided with a sloop in the English Channel off Dungeness, Kent, United Kingdom and was abandoned by her crew. She was on a voyage from Dieppe, Seine-Inférieure to La Rochelle, Charente-Maritime.
Fly	United Kingdom	The ship was wrecked near Peterhead, Aberdeenshire. Her crew were rescued. She was on a voyage from Dundee, Forfarshire to Aberdeen.
Harriet Newall	(United Kingdom of Great Britain and Ireland) British North America	The ship was lost in the Turks Islands. Her crew were rescued. She was on a voyage from Saint John, New Brunswick to Jamaica.
Phœnix	United Kingdom	The ship was driven ashore at Portsmouth, Hampshire.

== 2 December ==
List of shipwrecks: 2 December 1822
Ship	State	Description
Adventure	United Kingdom	The ship was driven ashore at Petten, North Holland, Netherlands. She was on a voyage from Boston, Lincolnshire to Great Yarmouth, Norfolk.
Aurora	United Kingdom	The ship was driven ashore at Horsey, Norfolk and sank. Her crew were rescued. She was on a voyage from Newcastle upon Tyne, Northumberland to London.

== 3 December ==
List of shipwrecks: 3 December 1822
Ship	State	Description
Melanie	United Kingdom	The ship foundered in the Mediterranean Sea between Formentera and Ibiza, Spain. She was on a voyage from London to Marseille, Bouches-du-Rhone, France.

== 4 December ==
List of shipwrecks: 4 December 1822
Ship	State	Description
Aurora	United Kingdom	The ship was wrecked at La Baye, Grenada. She was on a voyage from London to Grenada.
Cecelia	United States	The schooner foundered off the west coast of Curaçao. She was on a voyage from Curaçao to Gibraltar.
Edward and Mary	United Kingdom	The ship foundered in the Atlantic Ocean off Land's End, Cornwall. Her crew were rescued. She was on a voyage from Cork to Hull, Yorkshire.
Forth	United Kingdom	The ship was driven ashore at "Culdonnon". She was on a voyage from Burnt Island, Fife to Youghall, County Cork.
Froown	Russia	The ship was driven ashore in the River Shannon at Limerick, United Kingdom. She was on a voyage from Arkhangelsk to Lisbon, Portugal.
Ocean	United Kingdom	The ship departed from King's Lynn, Norfolk for Leith, Lothian. No further trace, presumed foundered with the loss of all hands.
William	United Kingdom	The ship was driven ashore at Margate, Kent. She was on a voyage from London to Southampton, Hampshire.

== 5 December ==
List of shipwrecks: 5 December 1822
Ship	State	Description
Active	United Kingdom	The ship was driven ashore at Holyhead, Anglesey. She was on a voyage from Málaga, Spain to Liverpool, Lancashire. Active was later refloated.
Alciope	United Kingdom	The ship was driven ashore at Caernarfon. She was on a voyage from Glasgow, Renfrewshire to Virginia, United States.
Alice and Amelia	United Kingdom	The ship sank in the Prince's Dock, Liverpool. She was on a voyage from Liverpool to Dundalk, County Louth.
Ann	United Kingdom	The Exeter-registered ship was driven ashore at Corton, Suffolk. Her crew were rescued. Ann was refloated in late December and taken in to Great Yarmouth. Norfolk.
Ann	United Kingdom	The London-registered ship was driven ashore at Corton, Suffolk. Her crew were rescued. She was refloated in late December and taken in to Great Yarmouth for repairs.
Ann	United Kingdom	The schooner foundered in the North Sea off Scarborough, Yorkshire. Her crew were rescued.
Ardent	United Kingdom	The ship was driven ashore at Ince, Cheshire. She was on a voyage from Cork to Liverpool.
Belfast	United Kingdom	The steamship was driven ashore and wrecked in Bootle Bay. All on board were rescued. She was on a voyage from Dublin to Liverpool.
Bethel	United Kingdom	The ship was driven ashore at Spurn Point, Yorkshire. She was on a voyage from Hamburg to Hull, Yorkshire.
Britannia	United Kingdom	The ship was driven ashore in the River Dee. She was on a voyage from Chester, Cheshire to London.
British Tar	United Kingdom	The ship was driven ashore and damaged in Bootle Bay. She was on a voyage from Narva, Russia to Liverpool. She was refloated on 13 December and taken in to Liverpool.
Caledonia	United Kingdom	The ship was driven ashore at Liverpool. She was on a voyage from Liverpool to Demerara.
Chance	United Kingdom	The ship foundered in the North Sea off Flamborough Head, Yorkshire. Her crew were rescued.
Chance	United Kingdom	The ship was lost on the Gunfleet Sand, in the North Sea off the coast of Essex.
Chili	Chile	The ship was driven ashore at Liverpool. She was on a voyage from Liverpool to Valparaíso. Chili was later refloated.
Dandy	United Kingdom	The ship sank in the Prince's Dock, Liverpool.
Don	United Kingdom	The sloop was driven ashore in Campbeltown Loch. She was on a voyage from Glasgow, Renfrewshire to Newry, County Antrim.
Dove	United Kingdom	The sloop was wrecked on the Buxey Sand, in the North Sea off Harwich, Essex. Her crew were rescued.
Ebor	United Kingdom	The ship was wrecked on the Gunfleet Sand. Her crew were rescued. She was on a voyage from London to Hull.
Eliza	United Kingdom	The ship was lost on the Gunfleet Sand. She was on a voyage from North Shields, County Durham to Rochester, Kent.
Farmer	United Kingdom	The schooner was presumed to have foundered in the North Sea with the loss of all six crew. She was on a voyage from Aberdeen to London.
Fortune	United Kingdom	The ship foundered in The Wash off King's Lynn, Norfolk. Her crew were rescued.
Gilbert	United Kingdom	The ship was driven ashore and damaged in Bootle Bay. She was on a voyage from Liverpool to Savannah, Georgia, United States. Gilbert was refloated on 10 December and taken in to Liverpool.
Happy Return	United Kingdom	The pilot boat foundered in the Irish Sea off Abergele, Denbighshire with the loss off all three crew.
Hartford	United Kingdom	The brig was lost on the Gunfleet Sand. Her crew were rescued by Good Intent (United Kingdom). Hartford was on a voyage from North Shields to London.
Hawke	United Kingdom	The ship foundered in the North Sea with the loss of all hands. She was on a voyage from Sunderland to Colchester, Essex.
Hero	United Kingdom	The ship was driven ashore in the River Dee. Her crew were rescued. She was on a voyage from Liverpool to Dublin.
Hope	United Kingdom	The ship departed from Boston, Lincolnshire for London. No further trace, probably foundered in the North Sea off Wells-next-the-Sea, Norfolk with the loss of all hands.
Janet	United Kingdom	The sloop was driven ashore at Cardigan. She was on a voyage from Wick, Caithness to Waterford. Janet was refloated in late December.
John	United Kingdom	The ship was sighted off Great Yarmouth whilst on a voyage from Colchester to Hull. No further trace, presumed foundered in the North Sea with the loss of all hands.
John and Sarah	United Kingdom	The ship was wrecked near Boscastle, Cornwall with the loss of all hands. She was on a voyage from Wexford to London.
Jonah	United Kingdom	The ship rang aground on the Gunfleet Sand and was damaged. She was on a voyage from Newcastle upon Tyne to London. Jonah was refloated and taken in to Harwich, Essex.
Kirkcudbright Castle	United Kingdom	The sloop was driven ashore in Campbeltown Loch. She was on a voyage from Barra, Outer Hebrides to London.
La Plata	Brazil	The ship was driven ashore at Liverpool with the loss of three lives. She was on a voyage from Liverpool to Montevideo. La Plata was later refloated.
Liberty	United Kingdom	The ship was driven ashore on Foyns Island, County Limerick.
Lily	United Kingdom	The ship was driven ashore at Ramsey, Isle of Man. She was on a voyage from Liverpool to Westport, County Mayo.
Little Mary	United Kingdom	The ship was lost on the Gunfleet Sand. Her crew were rescued. She was on a voyage from Sunderland to London. Little Mary subsequently drove ashore at Hollesley, Suffolk.
Lord Nelson	United Kingdom	The sloop was driven ashore and wrecked at Gwithian, Cornwall with the loss of all hands.
Lord Nelson	United Kingdom	The ship was abandoned in the North Sea south of Flamborough Head, Yorkshire. She was on a voyage from Wisbech, Cambridgeshire to Scarborough. Lord Nelson subsequently drove ashore at Heacham, Norfolk.
Margaret	United Kingdom	The ship was driven ashore in Campbeltown Loch. She was on a voyage from Ayr to Waterford.
Mary	United Kingdom	The ship was driven ashore at Garstang, Lancashire.
Mayflower	United Kingdom	The sloop was driven ashore in Campbeltown Loch.
Merchant	United Kingdom	The schooner was wrecked on the Barber Sand, in the North Sea off the coast of Norfolk. Her crew were rescued. She was on a voyage from Alnmouth, Northumberland to London.
Mercury	United Kingdom	The ship was wrecked on the Preston Banks, in the Irish Sea with the loss of all hands. She was on a voyage from Liverpool to Kirkcudbright, Wigtownshire.
Nelson	United Kingdom	The ship foundered in the North Sea off Great Yarmouth.
Orus	United Kingdom	The ship was wrecked on the Long Sand, in The Wash off King's Lynn with the loss of all hands.
Otho	United States	The ship was driven ashore and wrecked in bootle Bay. She was on a voyage from Liverpool to New York. Otho was later refloated.
Polly	United Kingdom	The ship was dismasted off the Galloper Sand, in the North Sea. Her crew were rescued on 7 December by Walcheren (Hamburg). Polly was on a voyage from South Shields to Southampton, Hampshire. She was taken in to Vlissingen, Zeeland, Netherlands on 9 December.
Prince Regent	United Kingdom	The steamship sank in the River Mersey off Ellesmere, Cheshire with the loss of eight of the 23 people on board' Survivors were rescued by the flat John (United Kingdom).
Robert and Ann	United Kingdom	The ship sank in the King's Dock, Liverpool. She was on a voyage from Waterford to Liverpool.
Robert and Margaret	United Kingdom	The ship was lost on the Gunfleet Sand. Her crew were rescued. She was on a voyage from North Shields, County Durham to London.
Rockingham	United States	The ship was driven ashore at the mouth of the River Dee and damaged. She was on a voyage from New York to Liverpool, Lancashire. Rockingham was consequently condemned, but was later refloated and taken in to the River Mersey.
St. Antonio Felix	Portugal	The ship was driven ashore at Glin, County Limerick. She was on a voyage from Limerick to Porto.
Strathearn Castle	United Kingdom	The ship was driven ashore at French Point, Argyllshire. She was on a voyage from "Wyburg" to Liverpool.
Thomas	United Kingdom	The ship was driven ashore at Liverpool. She was on a voyage from Saint Petersburgh, Russia to Liverpool. Thomas was later refloated.
Thomas and Alice	United Kingdom	The ship was driven ashore near Sandown, Isle of Wight. She was refloated the next day and taken in to Cowes, Isle of Wight.
Thomas and Ann	United Kingdom	The ship was driven ashore at Spurn Point.
Topaze	United Kingdom	The ship was driven ashore and wrecked at Crosby Point, Lancashire. She was on a voyage from Boston, Massachusetts, United States to Liverpool. Topaze was refloated in mid-December and taken in to Liverpool.
Ulysses	United Kingdom	The ship was driven ashore at Pile Foundry, Lancashire. She was on a voyage from Miramichi Bay to Liverpool.
Vigilant	Hamburg	The ship was wrecked on the Gunfleet Sand. Her crew were rescued. She was on a voyage from Hamburg to London.
Westmoreland	United Kingdom	The ship was wrecked in the Caicos Islands. Her crew were rescued. She was on a voyage from Quebec City, Lower Canada, British North America to Jamaica.
William	United Kingdom	The ship foundered in The Solent off Portsmouth, Hampshire. Her crew were rescued.
4	United Kingdom	The pilot boat was lost near Abergele, Denbighshire with the loss of three of her crew.

== 6 December ==
List of shipwrecks: 6 December 1822
Ship	State	Description
Acorn	United Kingdom	The ship was driven ashore and damaged on the Horse Sand, in The Solent. She was on a voyage from Sunderland, County Durham to Poole, Dorset. Acorn was later refloated and taken in to Portsmouth, Hampshire.
Aimable Elise	France	The ship put into Ramsgate, Kent, United Kingdom, where she sank. She was on a voyage from London to Havre de Grâce, Seine-Inférieure. Aimable Elise was later refloated.
Ardent	United Kingdom	The ship was driven ashore at Ince, Cheshire. She was on a voyage from Liverpool, Lancashire to Cork.
Britannia	United Kingdom	The ship was driven ashore in the River Dee.
Charles	France	The ship was driven ashore at Hellevoetsluis, South Holland, Netherlands. She was on a voyage from Rotterdam, South Holland to Havre de Grâce and Rouen, Seine-Inférieure. Charles was later refloated.
Elizabeth	United Kingdom	The ship was driven ashore on the coast of Essex. She was on a voyage from Cork to London. Elizabeth was later refloated and taken in to the River Thames.
Familien	Norway	The ship was wrecked on the Jadder Reef. She was on a voyage from Copenhagen to Stavanger.
General Smith	United States	The ship was driven ashore at Hellevoetsluis. She was refloated on 14 February 1823.
Hero	United Kingdom	The ship was driven ashore in the River Dee. All on board were rescued.
Hunter	United Kingdom	The ship was driven ashore and wrecked at Buenos Aires, Argentina.
Lammert	France	The ship was driven ashore at Hellevoetsluis. She was on a voyage from Rotterdam to Marseille, Bouches-du-Rhône. Lammert was later refloated.
Protection	United States	The ship was driven ashore at Hellevoetsluis. She was on a voyage from Rotterdam to Virginia. Protection was refloated on 25 February 1823.
Richard	United Kingdom	The ship was driven ashore at "Pole", Lancashire. She was on a voyage from Dublin to London.
Salmon	United Kingdom	The schooner foundered in the Irish Sea off St Bees Head, Cumberland with the loss of all hands. She was on a voyage from Annan, Dumfriesshire to Liverpool.

== 7 December ==
List of shipwrecks: 7 December 1822
Ship	State	Description
Ceres	United Kingdom	The ship was driven ashore on Texel, North Holland. She later refloated.
Fortuna	(Russian Empire) Grand Duchy of Finland	The ship as lost near Loviisa. She was on a voyage from Cádiz, Spain to Loviisa.
Granada	United Kingdom	The ship was driven ashore on Texel with the loss of three of her crew.
Hesperus	Netherlands	The ship was driven ashore on Texel. She was on a voyage from Amsterdam, North Holland to Surinam. Hesperus was later refloated and taken in to Medemblik, North Holland.
Johanna Maria Constantia	Netherlands	The ship was driven ashore on Texel.
Peter Anthony	United Kingdom	The ship was driven ashore on Texel.
Rockingham	United States	The ship was driven ashore at the Point of Ayr, Cheshire. She was on a voyage from New York to Liverpool.
Venus	Sweden	The ship was wrecked east of Ostend, West Flanders, Netherlands. She was on a voyage from St. Ubes, Portugal to Karlskrona.
Vijf Gebroeders	Netherlands	The ship was driven ashore on Eierland, North Holland. Her crew were rescued. She was on a voyage from Amsterdam, North Holland to Surinam.
Vriendschaft	Netherlands	The ship was driven ashore on Texel.
Westmoreland	United Kingdom	The ship foundered in the North Sea off Lowestoft, Suffolk with the loss of all but two of her crew.

== 8 December ==
List of shipwrecks: 8 December 1822
Ship	State	Description
Albion	United Kingdom	The ship ran aground on the Shipwash Sand, in the North Sea off the coast of Essex. She was on a voyage from Berwick upon Tweed, Northumberland to London. Albion was later refloated and taken in to Harwich, Essex.
Ange Guardian	France	The brig was wrecked on the Cufeo Bank, off Ensenada, Buenos Aires, Argentina. Her crew survived. She was on a voyage from Catalonia, Spain to Buenos Aires.
John Craig	United Kingdom	The ship was driven ashore at Buenos Aires. She was refloated on 14 December.

== 9 December ==
List of shipwrecks: 9 December 1822
Ship	State	Description
Alexander	United Kingdom	The ship was driven ashore in the Rock Channel. She was on a voyage from Philadelphia, Pennsylvania, United States to Liverpool, Lancashire. Alexander was refloated the next day and taken in to Liverpool.
Caroline	Hamburg	The ship was lost off the "Hever", Her crew were rescued. She was on a voyage from Porto, Portugal to Hamburg.

== 10 December ==
List of shipwrecks: 10 December 1822
Ship	State	Description
Amelia	(United Kingdom of Great Britain and Ireland) Jersey	The ship foundered in the Atlantic Ocean (45°00′N 45°10′W). Her crew were rescued by Brothock (United Kingdom). She was on a voyage from Newfoundland, British North America to Alicante, Spain.
Fabius	United States	The ship was wrecked on Grand Caicos Island. Her crew were rescued. She was on a voyage from Wilmington, Delaware to Port-au-Prince, Haiti.
Henrick Wilhelm	Denmark	The ship was wrecked near Bergen, Norway. She was on a voyage from Amsterdam, North Holland, Netherlands to Horsens.
Jefferson	United States	The ship was wrecked on the Île à Vache, Haiti. Her crew were rescued. She was on a voyage from Philadelphia, Pennsylvania to Dominica and Jamaica.
Neptune	United Kingdom	The sloop was lost near Fishguard, Pembrokeshire with the loss of all hands.

== 11 December ==
List of shipwrecks: 11 December 1822
Ship	State	Description
Lady of the Lake	United Kingdom	The ship was driven ashore at Buenos Aires, Argentina.
Margaret	United Kingdom	The ship ran aground on the Thrumcat Shoals. She was on a voyage from kingston, Jamaica to Halifax, Nova Scotia, British North America.
Vriendschap	Netherlands	The ship was driven ashore at the mouth of the Ems. She was on a voyage from Saint Petersburg, Russia to Amsterdam, North Holland.

== 12 December ==
List of shipwrecks: 12 December 1822
Ship	State	Description
Actif	Portugal	The ship foundered in the Atlantic Ocean off Cape St. Vincent. She was on a voyage from Madeira to Antwerp, United Kingdom of the Netherlands.
Xenophon	United Kingdom	The ship was driven ashore on the Pluckington Bank, in Liverpool Bay. She was on a voyage from Liverpool, Lancashire to London. Xenophon was refloated on 14 December and taken in to Liverpool.

== 13 December ==
List of shipwrecks: 13 December 1822
Ship	State	Description
Isabella	United Kingdom	The ship sprang a leak in the North Sea off Flamborough Head and was abandoned by her crew. They were rescued by Autumn (United Kingdom). She was on a voyage from Aberdeen to Sunderland, County Durham.
Maister	United Kingdom	The ship was wrecked on Tiree, Inner Hebrides. Her crew were rescued.

== 14 December ==
List of shipwrecks: 14 December 1822
Ship	State	Description
John & James	(United Kingdom of Great Britain and Ireland) British North America	The ship ran ashore on the north coast of "Montanti". She was on a voyage from Trinidad to Campobello Island, New Brunswick.
HMS Racehorse	Royal Navy	The Cruizer-class brig-sloop was wrecked off Langness, Isle of Man with the loss of six of her 121 crew and also that of three rescuers.

== 15 December ==
List of shipwrecks: 15 December 1822
Ship	State	Description
Ann Elizabeth	United Kingdom	The ship was wrecked at Nevlunghavn, Norway.
Cæsar	United Kingdom	The ship was wrecked on Iona, Inner Hebrides. Her crew were rescued.
William and Alfred	United Kingdom	The West Indiaman was destroyed by fire in the West India Docks, London.

== 16 December ==
List of shipwrecks: 16 December 1822
Ship	State	Description
Concordia	Norway	The ship was lost near Uddevalla, Sweden. She was on a voyage from Newry, County Armagh, United Kingdom to Christiana.
George IV	United Kingdom	The ship was driven ashore near Dipper Harbour, New Brunswick, British North America. She was on a voyage from Saint John, New Brunswick, British North America to Demerara.
Industry	United Kingdom	The ship was driven ashore near Digby, Nova Scotia, British North America. She was on a voyage from Saint John, New Brunswick, to A Coruña, Spain.
Margaret	(France) Martinique	The ship capsized and sank in the Atlantic Ocean off the mouth of the Weyma River. There were three survivors. She was on a voyage from Martinique to Demerara.
Robert	United Kingdom	The ship was holed by her anchor and sank in the River Foyle at Londonderry.
William & Alfred	United Kingdom	The ship caught fire at Liverpool, Lancashire and was scuttled.

== 17 December ==
List of shipwrecks: 17 December 1822
Ship	State	Description
Kiero	United Kingdom	The ship was driven ashore on Saltholm, Denmark. She was on a voyage from Saint Petersburg, Russia to Hull, Yorkshire. Kiero was refloated on 21 December and put into Copenhagen, Denmark.
Lord Wellington	United Kingdom	The ship was wrecked on the Anholt Reef, in the Kattegat. Her crew were rescued. She was on a voyage from Saint Petersburgh to London.
Success	United Kingdom	The ship was driven ashore and wrecked near Arklow, County Wicklow. She was on a voyage from Dublin to Cork.

== 18 December ==
List of shipwrecks: 18 December 1822
Ship	State	Description
Ingeborg	Duchy of Holstein	The ship ran aground off Gotland, Sweden and was damaged. She was on a voyage from Saint Petersburg, Russia to Flensburg. Ingeborg was later refloated and put into Catterhamswick for repairs.
Samuel Thornton	United Kingdom	The ship was wrecked on Saaremaa, Russia. She was on a voyage from Saint Petersburg to London.

== 19 December ==
List of shipwrecks: 19 December 1822
Ship	State	Description
Achille	France	Captain Bernabo's ship was driven ashore at St. Pierre, Martinique.
Achille	France	Captain Troquet's ship was driven ashore at St. Pierre.
Adolphe	France	The ship was driven ashore at Knokke, West Flanders, Netherlands. Her crew were rescued.
Alfred	France	The ship was driven ashore at St. Pierre.
Antoinette	France	The ship was driven ashore at St. Pierre.
Arethusa	France	The ship was driven ashore at St. Pierre.
Aspern	United Kingdom	The ship was driven ashore and sank at Newhaven, Sussex. She was on a voyage from Sunderland, County Durham to Newhaven. Aspern was refloated the next day and taken in to Newhaven in a severely damaged condition.
Atalante	(France) Martinique	The ship was driven ashore at St. Pierre.
Basse Terre	France	The ship was driven ashore at St. Pierre.
Cornelie	France	The ship was driven ashore at St. Pierre.
Cosmopolite	United States	The ship was driven ashore at St. Pierre.
Deux Cousins	(France) Martinique	The ship was driven ashore at St. Pierre.
Diamond	(United Kingdom of Great Britain and Ireland) St. Vincent	The schooner was driven ashore on St. Vincent.
Eagle	United States	The ship was driven ashore at St. Pierre.
Elizabeth	France	The ship was driven ashore at St. Pierre.
Elizabeth	United States	The ship was driven ashore at St. Pierre.
Enterprize	(France) Martinique	The ship was driven ashore at St. Pierre.
Fabricus	France	The ship was driven ashore at St. Pierre.
Fauche	(France) Martinique	The ship was driven ashore at St. Pierre.
Felicité	France	The ship was driven ashore at St. Pierre.
Fils-Unique	France	The ship was driven ashore at St. Pierre.
Hero	(United Kingdom of Great Britain and Ireland) St. Vincent	The lugger was driven ashore at St. Vincent.
Huret	(France) Martinique	The ship was driven ashore at St. Pierre.
Hyacinth	United Kingdom	The ship was wrecked on the Blackwater Bank, in the Irish Sea with the loss of three of the eight people on board. She was on a voyage from Liverpool, Lancashire to Wexford.
Intrepido	France	The ship was driven ashore at St. Pierre.
Jeanne	French Navy	The warship foundered in the Bay of Biscay. Her nineteen crew were rescued by Rapid (United Kingdom). Jeanne was on a voyage from Brest, Finistère to Rochefort, Charente-Maritime.
L'Adolphe	France	The ship was driven ashore and wrecked at Knocke, West Flanders, Netherlands. Her eighteen crew were rescued.
Maria Caroline	United States	The ship was wrecked on "Bonnet Point". Her crew were rescued. She was on a voyage from New Orleans, Louisiana to Providence, Rhode Island.
Mary Jane	United States	The ship was driven ashore at St. Pierre.
Matthew King	(United Kingdom of Great Britain and Ireland) Barbados	The ship was driven ashore at Barbados. She was subsequently declared a total loss.
Merlin	(France) Martinique	The ship was driven ashore at St. Pierre.
Mount Vernon	United States	The ship was driven ashore at St. Pierre.
Nancy Ann	United States	The ship was driven ashore at St. Pierre.
Neveux	(France) Martinique	The ship was driven ashore at St. Pierre.
Paramaribo	United States	The ship was driven ashore at St. Pierre.
Prefereé	France	The ship was driven ashore at St. Pierre.
President	France	The ship was driven ashore at St. Pierre.
Rebecca	(United Kingdom of Great Britain and Ireland) Nevis	The schooner was driven ashore and wrecked at Barbados.
Richmond Packet	United States	The ship was driven ashore at St. Pierre.
Saint Honoré	France	The ship was driven ashore at St. Pierre.
Victor et Felicie	France	The ship was driven ashore at St. Pierre.
Vincent	France	The ship was driven ashore at St. Pierre.
Whim	(United Kingdom of Great Britain and Ireland) St. Vincent	The ship was driven ashore at St. Pierre.
William and Mary	United Kingdom	The ship was wrecked on the Whitaker Sand, in the North Sea. Her crew were rescued by Perth (United Kingdom).

== 20 December ==
List of shipwrecks: 20 December 1822
Ship	State	Description
Hebe	United Kingdom	The ship was beached at Penzance, Cornwall.
Superior	United States	The ship was driven ashore on Marie-Galante. Her crew were rescued.

== 21 December ==
List of shipwrecks: 21 December 1822
Ship	State	Description
Agnes	Spain	The ship was driven ashore at La Guayra, Gran Colombia.
Christopher	United Kingdom	The ship was driven ashore in Studland Bay. She was on a voyage from Newcastle upon Tyne, Northumberland to Poole, Dorset.
Columbus	United Kingdom	The ship was driven ashore at La Guayra, Gran Colombia.
Dido	United States	The ship was lost at Alvarado, Mexico.
Jupiter	Spain	The ship was wrecked in the Abaco Islands. She was on a voyage from Málaga to Havana, Cuba.
Veloce	United Kingdom	The schooner was driven ashore at La Guayra.

== 22 December ==
List of shipwrecks: 22 December 1822
Ship	State	Description
Agnes	United States	The ship was driven ashore and wrecked at La Guayra, Gran Colombia.
Belier	flag unknown	The ship was driven ashore and wrecked at La Guayra with the loss of a crew member.
Caravan	United States	The ship was driven ashore and wrecked at La Guayra.
Cherub	United States	The ship was driven ashore and wrecked at La Guayra.
Colombia	(United Kingdom of Great Britain and Ireland) Virgin Islands	The ship was driven ashore and wrecked at La Guayra.
Dauntless	United States	The ship was driven ashore and wrecked at La Guayra.
Eendragt	Netherlands	The ship was driven ashore and wrecked at La Guayra.
Endymion	United States	The ship was driven ashore and wrecked at La Guayra.
Fantasie	flag unknown	The ship was driven ashore and wrecked at La Guayra. Her crew were rescued.
Leda	United Kingdom	The ship was driven ashore and wrecked at La Guayra.
Loraine	United States	The ship was driven ashore and wrecked at La Guayra.
Princess Charlotte	United Kingdom	The brig was driven ashore and wrecked at La Guayra.
Reine	flag unknown	The ship was driven ashore and wrecked at La Guayra. Her crew were rescued.
Statira	flag unknown	The ship was driven ashore and wrecked at La Guayra. Her crew were rescued.
Sarah	United Kingdom	The ship was driven ashore and wrecked at La Guayra.
Teazer	United Kingdom	The ship departed from Cork for São Miguel, Azores, Portugal. No further trace, presumed foundered with the loss of all hands.
Valious	(United Kingdom of Great Britain and Ireland) Virgin Islands	The ship was driven ashore and wrecked at La Guayra.
Veloz	United Kingdom	The ship was driven ashore and wrecked at la Guayra. Her crew were rescued.
Veloz	Gran Colombia	The privateer was driven ashore and wrecked at La Guayra with the loss of two of her crew.
West Indian	United States	The ship was driven ashore and wrecked at La Guayra.

== 23 December ==
List of shipwrecks: 23 December 1822
Ship	State	Description
Martha	United Kingdom	The ship was wrecked near Garlieston, Wigtownshire. Her crew were rescued.

== 25 December ==
List of shipwrecks: 25 December 1822
Ship	State	Description
Medina	United Kingdom	The ship was driven ashore at Pegwell Bay, Kent. She was on a voyage from Portsmouth, Hampshire to London. Medina was later refloated.
William	United Kingdom	The ship was lost near Dulas, Anglesey. Her crew were rescued. She was on a voyage from Liverpool, Lancashire to Limerick.

== 27 December ==
List of shipwrecks: 27 December 1822
Ship	State	Description
Icare	France	The lugger foundered in the English Channel. Her seventeen crew were rescued by Rapid (United Kingdom). She was on a voyage from Bristol, Gloucestershire, United Kingdom to the Charente River.
Lord Townsend	United Kingdom	The sloop was wrecked on the Foreness Rock, Margate, Kent. She was on a voyage from Dover to Woolwich.

== 28 December ==
List of shipwrecks: 28 December 1822
Ship	State	Description
Alert	United Kingdom	The brig was beached near Lewistown, Maryland, United States.
Lord Townsend	United Kingdom	The ship was driven ashore and wrecked at Margate, Kent.
Ordnance	United Kingdom	The sloop was wrecked on the Foreign Rock, off Margate. She was on a voyage from Dover to Woolwich, Kent.
Sally	United Kingdom	The ship was driven ashore and wrecked at Crane Point, County Waterford. She was on a voyage from Whitehaven, Cumberland to Liverpool, Lancashire.
Sarah Edwards	United Kingdom	The sloop foundered off Chagres, Gran Colombia. She was on a voyage from Chagres to Jamaica.

== 29 December ==
List of shipwrecks: 29 December 1822
Ship	State	Description
Brunton	United Kingdom	The ship was driven ashore and wrecked at the Spanish Battery, North Shields, County Durham. Her crew were rescued.
Governor Halkett	United Kingdom	The ship was wrecked on the Gunfleet Sand, in the North Sea off the coast of Essex. Her crew were rescued. She was on a voyage from "Wyburg" to London.
Hope	United Kingdom	The sloop foundered in the Irish Sea off Ardmore, County Waterford with the loss of all hands.
Swift	United Kingdom	The sloop was driven ashore 3 nautical miles (5.6 km) from Dungarvan, County Antrim. Her crew were rescued. She was on a voyage from São Miguel Island, Azores, Portugal to Bristol, Gloucestershire. Swift was refloated on 7 January 1823 and taken in to Galway.
Vriendschap van Amsterdam	Netherlands	The ship foundered in the English Channel off Hastings, Sussex, United Kingdom.

== 30 December ==
List of shipwrecks: 30 December 1822
Ship	State	Description
Achille	France	The ship was lost during a hurricane at Martinique.
Ann & Dorothy	United Kingdom	The brig was driven ashore at Sunderland, County Durham.
Brothers	United Kingdom	The brig was driven ashore at Sunderland.
Chester	United Kingdom	The brig was driven ashore at Sunderland.
Cyrus	United Kingdom	The brig was driven ashore at Sunderland.
Dwina	United Kingdom	The ship was wrecked in Sandwich Bay, Kent, Her crew were rescued. She was on a voyage from Pärnu, Russia to Liverpool, Lancashire.
Elizabeth	France	The ship was lost during a hurricane at Martinique.
Elizabeth	United Kingdom	The brig was driven ashore at Sunderland.
Fenwick	United Kingdom	The brig was driven ashore at Sunderland.
Françoise Rose	France	The ship was driven ashore and wrecked at Start Point, Devon, United Kingdom with the loss of a crew member. She was on a voyage from Bordeaux, Gironde to Rouen, Seine-Inférieure.
Friendship	United Kingdom	The brig was driven ashore at Sunderland.
Julia	United Kingdom	The brig was driven ashore at Sunderland.
Maria Ann	United Kingdom	The brig was driven ashore at Sunderland.
Polly	United Kingdom	The sloop was driven ashore at Sunderland.
Squirrel	United Kingdom	The brig was driven ashore at Sunderland.
Wealands	United Kingdom	The brig was driven ashore at Sunderland.

== 31 December ==
List of shipwrecks: 31 December 1822
Ship	State	Description
David Richards	United Kingdom	The ship was last sighted on this date whilst on a voyage from Falmouth, Jamaica to Liverpool, Lancashire. No further trace, presumed foundered with the loss of all hands.
Patriot	United Kingdom	The ship was driven onto the Drumroof Bank, in the Solway Firth and foundered. Her crew were rescued. She was on a voyage from Dumfries to Glasgow, Renfrewshire.

== Unknown date ==
List of shipwrecks: Unknown date in December 1822
Ship	State	Description
Adolphus	France	The ship was lost on Bornholm, Denmark. She was on a voyage from Bordeaux, Gironde to Saint Petersburg, Russia.
Alicampane	(United Kingdom of Great Britain and Ireland) British North America	The ship foundered whilst on a voyage from Placentia Bay to St. John's, Newfoundland. The ship's dog survived.
Cæsar	United Kingdom	The ship was wrecked off the island of Tiree. Her crew were rescued.
Catharine	Russia	The ship was driven ashore at Vourlá, Ottoman Empire. She was later refloated and arrived at Smirna on 15 January 1823.
Edward and Mary	United Kingdom	The ship foundered in the Atlantic Ocean off Land's End, Cornwall. Her crew were rescued. She was on a voyage from Cork to Hull, Yorkshire.
Frederick Wilhelm	Stettin	The ship was driven ashore near Helsingør, Denmark before 3 December. She was on a voyage from Stettin to Porto, Portugal.
Freunde	Prussia	The ship was wrecked near Arendal, Norway. She was on a voyage from Rügenwalde to London, United Kingdom.
General Henderson	United States	The ship was driven ashore and wrecked at Liverpool. She was on a voyage from Liverpool to Savannah, Georgia.
Gleaner	United Kingdom	The ship was driven ashore on the Isle of Man. She was on a voyage from Londonderry to Liverpool.
Harriet	United Kingdom	The ship was driven ashore in the Saint Lawrence River before 6 December. She was on a voyage from Quebec City, Lower Canada to Halifax, Nova Scotia, British North America.
Heinrich Wilhelm	Stettin	The ship was wrecked on Saaremaa, Russia. She was on a voyage from Saint Petersburg to Stettin.
Juno	Netherlands	The ship was driven ashore near Amsterdam, North Holland. She was on a voyage from Riga, Russia to Amsterdam.
Latona	United Kingdom	The ship was holed by an anchor and was beached at Holyhead, Anglesey. She was on a voyage from Liverpool to Gibraltar.
Maister	United Kingdom	The ship was wrecked off the Isle of Tyree. She was on a voyage from Miramichi Bay to the Clyde.
Najaden	Unknown	The ship departed from Marseille, Bouches-du-Rhône, France for Havana, Cuba. No further trace, presumed foundered with the loss of all hands.
Perseverance	United Kingdom	The ship was struck by lightning off "Turmoan" and burnt. Her crew were rescued.
Spartan	United Kingdom	The ship was lost near Lagos, Xanthi, Greece before 10 December.
Susannah	United Kingdom	The ship sprang a leak and was abandoned in the North Sea 100 nautical miles (190 km) west of Domesnes, Norway. Her crew were rescued by a Swedish ship. She was on a voyage from Falmouth, Cornwall to Hull.
