= Louisburg =

Louisburg is the name of some places in the United States and Canada:

- Louisburg, Kansas
- Louisburg, Minnesota
- Louisburg, Missouri
- Louisburg, North Carolina
- Louisburg, Wisconsin
- Louisbourg, Nova Scotia (often spelled "Louisburg")

== See also ==
- Lewisburg (disambiguation)
- Louisburgh (disambiguation)
