= House at 11 Beach Street =

Historic house in Massachusetts, United States

- U.S. National Register of Historic Places
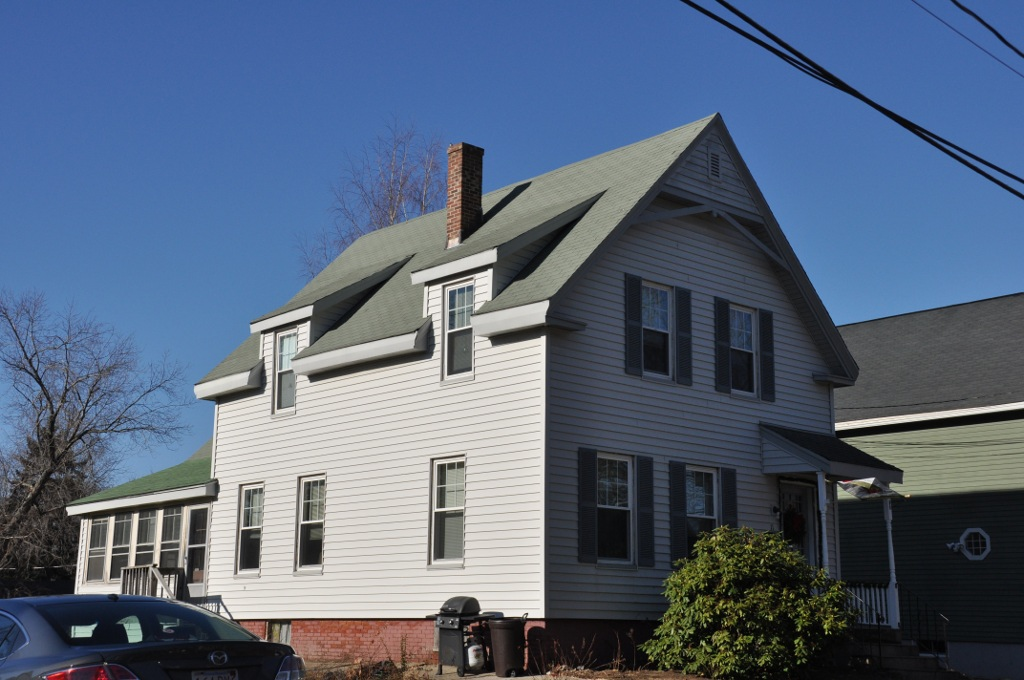

- Location within Massachusetts Location within the United States
- Location: 11 Beach St., Reading, Massachusetts
- Coordinates: 42°31′18.11″N 71°5′40.69″W
- Area: less than one acre
- Built: 1880
- Architectural style: Stick/Eastlake, Queen Anne
- MPS: Reading MRA
- NRHP reference No.: 84002659
- Added to NRHP: July 19, 1984

11 Beach Street in Reading, Massachusetts is a modest Queen Anne cottage, built c. 1875-1889 based on a published design. Its first documented owner was Emily Ruggles, a prominent local businesswoman and real estate developer. The house was listed on the National Register of Historic Places in 1984.

== Description and history ==
11 Beach Street is located in a residential area east of downtown Reading, on the southwest side of the short street. Its neighbor to the south, #17, is of substantially similar construction. It is a 1 1/2-story wood-frame structure, with a front-facing gable roof. Its front facade is three bays wide, with the entrance in the rightmost bay, sheltered by a shed-roof porch supported by turned columns. The attic half-story has two sash windows, and there is Stick style woodwork at the peak of the gable. Photos from a 1980 survey show fish-scale shingles and applied woodwork on the gable wall around and above the attic windows; these features have been removed or covered over.

The house was built sometime in the 1880s as a speculative venture by Emily Ruggles, a prominent local businesswoman who operated a dry goods store and bought land on Beach Street for development in 1875. This house and the one adjacent were the first houses she had built, and appear to have been based on widely published architectural patterns. Her venture into real estate was unsuccessful. In the early 20th century, a resident of the house was Oscar Lowande, a prominent period circus performer.

== See also ==
- National Register of Historic Places listings in Reading, Massachusetts
- National Register of Historic Places listings in Middlesex County, Massachusetts
