= Harry Lewiston =

Lithuanian-born American circus proprietor

A double exposure of Harry Lewiston

Harry Lewiston (April 2, 1900 – June 1, 1965; legal name Israel Harry Jaffe) was an American showman, freak show director, and barker. He wrote his memoirs under his stage name, published posthumously in 1968 as Freak Show Man: the Autobiography of Harry Lewiston, as told to Jerry Holtman.

== Early life and name change ==
Harry Lewiston was born Israel Harry Jaffe in Lithuania on April 2, 1900, and emigrated to the United States with his family in 1906. The eldest of four siblings, he was raised in Worcester, Massachusetts in a strict Orthodox Jewish household. In 1914, he ran away from home and joined the combined Sells Floto Circus / Buffalo Bill's Wild West Show. He claimed that he was seventeen years old in order to be allowed to stay with the circus, and was renamed "Lewiston," reportedly assigned based on the first major city he worked in, Lewiston, Maine. While the circus toured the United States, Lewiston worked as a pony groomer and led the animals in the parade, wearing what he called an "Arab costume" as part of that year's "East Meets West" theme.

== World War I ==
After World War I broke out, Lewiston left the circus to enlist. After briefly being attached for training with the Canadian Army (serial number S-4147), he proceeded to the United Kingdom and was posted to the 40th Battalion of Britain's Royal Fusiliers in the Jewish Legion in 1918, serving as a camp cook (regimental number J5873). In his autobiography, he mentions serving with David Ben-Gurion, who was in the 38th; those units were stationed together in Palestine and other sites. Throughout the war, he was stationed in Taranto, Italy; Port Said, Egypt; Kantara, Egypt; Lod, Palestine; and Damascus, Syria. He noted that while in Damascus he was promoted to lance corporal; his actual service records show him being discharged at the rank of private. After the war ended, he traveled to South Africa to see relatives, as well as Rhodesia, India, and Burma, and eventually shipped back to England. In December 1919, he was officially discharged from military service, sailed from Liverpool to New York City aboard the S.S. Cedric, and from there returned to Massachusetts.

== Return to the United States ==
Lewiston stayed with his family in Worcester for a short period of time, working as a shophand in a machine shop. Subsequently, he worked various jobs in New York City, then rode the rails to a few towns. In his autobiography, he mentions being arrested for vagrancy in eastern Georgia and working on a chain gang for six days. He then went to Cleveland and briefly worked in a restaurant.

== Return to circus life ==
In 1920, Lewiston went to Peru, Indiana, the winter quarters of five railroad circuses. He was hired by the John Robinson Shows, where he first worked as an usher, then as a "candy butcher," selling concessions during the show as well as during the concert after the show. After the circus season ended for the winter, he worked as a candy butcher for the Union News Company on their train the West Point Railroad, which traveled back and forth from Atlanta to Jacksonville.

In 1921 and 1922, Lewiston worked as a candy butcher and concessions buyer for Howes Great London Circus. In his autobiography, he mentions that this is when he learned conning, grafting, and short-changing techniques. He then wintered with Christy Brothers Circus in Houston and worked in their ticket booth the following season, where he began to practice his short-changing technique. Over the next few years, he worked as assistant manager of concessions and as the purchasing agent with Gollmar Bros. Circus, then as a ticket seller for Gentry Bros. Circus, where he dated a hoochie coochie dancer. Subsequently, he switched to Golden Brothers Circus, where he ran the hamburger stand, sold balloons and novelties, and also served as the substitute announcer. This was his first experience as a barker, referred to as a "talker" in the circus community (though "barker" will be used throughout this entry for ease of understanding).

In early 1925, he worked with the newly formed Carolina Minstrels, an all-black troupe based in Shelbyville, Kentucky. He "strutted downtown at the head of the band to make announcements," and also sold reserved tickets, supervised equipment unloading and setup, and sold prize candy. Later that year, he switched to Miller Brothers 101 Ranch show, where he worked as a ticket seller and sideshow announcer. He worked for Miller Brothers again the following year, but was fired by Joe Miller for short-changing patrons. Lewiston was hired by the Boyd and Linderman Shows to organize and hire performers and musicians for a hoochie coochie show. After the touring season ended, he ran a (fixed) betting wheel for Pollack's 20 Big Shows. In early 1927, he worked as a candy butcher and a fill-in performer for Pat Whale's Traveling Burlesque Show, and then briefly ran a brothel/speakeasy in Kansas City, Missouri before the police shut it down.

== Marriage and continued circus career ==
In fall 1927, Lewiston was hired as the assistant to Arthur Hoffman of the Morris and Castle carnival. He prepared the opening of Singer's Midgets show at the Mississippi Valley Fair in Davenport, Iowa, where he also talked up the show on the midway and sold tickets. It was at this time that he met his future wife Rose Adelstein, who was working with Morris and Castle as a mentalist/fortuneteller under the name "Lady Zindra." Lewiston stayed on with Morris and Castle the following year, and was named the manager of the "Broadway review" show. He began dating Rose, who was also raised as an Orthodox Jew, and they married on November 26, 1928, in Cook County, Illinois. She took his legal last name and became Rose Jaffe, but continued to perform as a fortune teller under her stage name and was known socially as Rose Lewiston.

In 1929, they both worked for the Al G. Barnes Circus sideshow. Lewiston worked again as an assistant to Arthur Hoffman, and Rose was a fortune teller. In 1930, they initially worked for the Hagenbeck-Wallace Circus. Lewiston managed the sideshow, and Rose was a fortune teller, but the show closed in late August from poor sales due to the Great Depression. Subsequently, they returned to Morris and Castle, and Lewiston brought several circus freaks with him. They stayed with Morris and Castel in 1931, and Lewiston and Rose also added a duo mindreading act to their performance at several state fairs. In 1932, he switched to the John T. Wortham Carnival, where he ran the privilege car and managed a fortune telling booth, while Rose returned to fortunetelling for the Al. G. Barnes Circus that season.

== Chicago World's Fair ==
In late 1932, Lewiston was hired by sideshow impresario Duke Mills to organize a freak show for the upcoming "Century of Progress" World's Fair in Chicago, and to serve as the barker and managing director. The freak show opened in 1933, but competed poorly with Ripley's Believe It Or Not located just down the midway, and closed early after approximately six weeks. Lewiston was soon hired by showmen Lew Dufour and Joe Rogers to design the "Darkest Africa" show on the Midway at the World's Fair, featuring Africans from Nigeria, Uganda, Belgian Congo, and French Congo, and representing the Ubangi, Karamojo, and Ashanti ethnic groups. Sometimes calling himself "Major Lewiston" or "Captain Lewiston," ranks above what he had earned, he worked as a barker for this show as well:

"Another of the lecturers, Capt. Harry Lewiston, formerly of the British army, also spoke of the blacks with genuine respect, adding, apropos of the Nigerians, "You know, those men have eyesight about 300 per cent better than ours. Brave and strong! Look at the play of muscles on those backs! Give me a hundred thousand such men, trained in the use of modern arms, and I'll conquer the moon -- as the German officers used to say." "

That winter, Lewiston and Rose did their duo mindreading act for Morris Miller's Traveling Museum.

== Ringling Bros. and Barnum & Bailey Circus ==
While working at the World's Fair in 1933, Lewiston was approached by Clyde Ingalls and hired to work at Ringling Bros. and Barnum & Bailey Circus the following year. He started in the sideshow ticket booth and the bally stand next to it in 1934, but was promoted as Ingalls' chief assistant on his second day. Lewiston also served as the sideshow pay master, and did special announcements. In his autobiography, he proudly notes that he adapted the circus slogan, coining the phrase "The Greatest Side Show on Earth." While the circus was closed that winter, Lewiston and Rose did their duo mindreading act for the Gus Sun Circuit.

In 1935, Lewiston started at the Ringling Bros. and Barnum & Bailey Circus opening at Madison Square Garden, where he directed the "Parade of the Freaks" from the center ring / hippodrome. Billboard noted that he was "assistant manager of Clyde Ingalls' Side Show" and "has been alternating with latter on big show announcements," meaning that Lewiston was the chief announcer for the main circus acts, not just the sideshow. The magazine also noted that Lewiston would "also present a mental act on road tour," which was a first for that circus; Ringling Bros. had previously distanced itself from acts traditionally associated with defrauding the public. Rose was hired to perform as "Madam Zindra," the circus' first-ever mentalist. The couple continued to work with this circus for the next two years.

== Harry Lewiston's Traveling Museum ==
Rose Lewiston (far left), Eli Lewiston (child on left), Harry Lewiston (far right), and several of their performing "freaks." Identified performers include Grace McDaniels the "Mule-Faced Woman" (just left of center in the back row; most of her face is hidden) and Tony Marino the sword swallower (in suit and tie).

In late 1937, Lewiston and Rose left Ringling Bros. to form their own organization, and brought several circus freaks with them, including Grace McDaniels the "Mule-Faced Woman," tattooed girl Stella Grassman, Clico the African pygmy, "Human Balloon" Art Hubbell, Disco the magician, Lady Johanna the mentalist, sword swallowers John and Vivian Dunning, and Mel Burkhart the "Anatomical Wonder," who subsequently developed his "Human Blockhead" act while working in this show. Harry Lewiston's Traveling Museum (also known as "Lewiston's Big Circus Sideshow," "World's Fair Freaks," and "Palace of Oddities") featured a variety of sideshow and freak performers, a "girlie show," and snakes. Additionally, Rose managed several fortune tellers and served as the entire organization's treasurer. They initially paired up with the Conklin and Garret Shows and performed at venues throughout the United States and Canada, including the Canadian National Exhibition. Their son Eli was born in Illinois in February 1938, and later became part of the act. He was billed as the baby of two dwarfs, with advertisements featuring teasers including "Midget Couple and Normal Baby, 10-mo. old son." Lewiston's python display, which included a wrestling act, was featured in a full-column article with two more columns of photos in The Charlotte Observer, and an excerpt of the story even received national attention:

A typical newspaper ad placed by Harry Lewiston to solicit customers

"Charlotte, N.C., March 25 (AP) - Pete, a thirty-foot python, had a late luncheon today - six months late. Pythons, Harry Lewiston, keeper of the reptile, explained, eat only about once every three months. Pete hurt his throat nine months ago and had to pass up two meals. Today, with an eight-foot rubber hose, he was fed a snack of thirty pounds of chopped meat, fifteen dozen eggs and fifteen pounds of crushed bone. It took eighteen men to hold Pete while they fed him."

While Rose ran her "Palace of Knowledge" at the New York World's Fair in 1939 and 1940, Lewiston continued to bring his museum on tour, traveling with organizations including truck carnival William Glick Shows and Johnny J. Jones Carnival. He ran an enlarged side show, including his snakes, plus a freak animal show. While traveling with Jones in Warren, Pennsylvania, during the summer of 1940, Lewiston's sword swallower Lady Vivian Dunning was profiled in the local paper. Lewiston also claims to have been the first showman to buy and repurpose the "headless girl" display, transforming it from a simple illusion act to fooling audiences by pretending she was real. He rigged the exhibit with flowing liquids and medical equipment, and created the story of "Olga Hess," who had been decapitated on a train but was kept alive by a doctor.

One of the "Lewiston Enterprises" trucks used to transport the Traveling Museum

Throughout the early to mid-1940s, the museum continued to perform successfully, typically contracting with amusement parks and state fairs during the summers and touring during the winters. In 1941, Harry Lewiston's Traveling Museum joined the Happy Land Shows for summer events in Michigan. Later that season, they performed at the Cambria County Fair in Ebensburg, Pennsylvania. He notes in his autobiography that due to the lewd nature of part of the show, he was sentenced to nine months jail in Eastern State Penitentiary, as were several hoochie coochie girls, though they were all released after six days. In 1942, while the museum was in Erie, Pennsylvania, Harry Lewiston's performing "stone man" Charles Porter visited a famous local resident also suffering from the disease (likely Fibrodysplasia ossificans progressiva), and they were profiled in the local paper.

Harry Lewiston placed this ad in the May 27, 1944, issue of Billboard to solicit new acts

In 1944, while the museum was installed for a month in Pittsburgh, the two legal guardians of Bobo and Kiki, the show's "pinheads," arrived to take the pair back home to Texas. After Rose objected that their contract had not yet expired, a fight broke out, and a local patrolman arrested all five of them. Charges were later dismissed, and the pinheads stayed on with the show. In late 1945, he formed a partnership called Gayer & Lewiston Enterprises with Archie Gayer, operator of Archie's Playland Arcade in Detroit. They co-ran the Monroe Theatre, and a new annex was added to the back of the arcade, where Lewiston managed a variety of attractions for several years, including an exhibit titled "Crime Does Not Pay," bazaars, and sideshow acts.

Harry Lewiston and sword swallower Tony Marino

In 1947, while working for Lewiston over July 4 weekend, sword swallower Tony Marino "gulped a two-foot length of lighted neon tube, glowed at his appreciative audience, bowed, thereupon went out like a light, [and] was hustled to a hospital for removal of the shattered tube." After two weeks of recuperation, including treatment with a stomach pump, milk of magnesia, and oatmeal, Marino continued performing with Lewiston's Museum. In 1950, Lewiston ran sideshows at Edgewater Park, Eastwood Park, and Jefferson Beach in Detroit, the first time that any single show operator had attractions at all three parks at once. In 1951, he leased sideshow and concert operation rights from Mills Bros. for their 32-week season. He noted in his autobiography that he was bitten in the face by a South American boa constrictor during this time.

== Post-performance life ==
Harry Lewiston's autobiography

In the early 1950s, Harry (now calling himself "Jaffe" again) and Rose retired from performance and management life, and moved to Florida, where they invested in several hotel properties. Rose died from cancer in April 1954, and was buried in Cook County, Illinois. In December 1955, he married a woman named Leona Decker in Monroe County, Florida.

In 1957, the couple moved to the Los Angeles area. Harry's health, especially his eyesight, had deteriorated badly. In his autobiography, he speculates that this might have been due to his heavy drinking. They invested in several properties, and a local daily newspaper ran a profile article of the famous circus man who had bought a hotel. He began writing a weekly column for a paper in Fontana, California. Concurrently, he started an employment agency, and also worked to help recent parolees reintegrate into society. His service was lauded by the state board of corrections at a testimonial dinner.

As his health waned, he began working on his memoirs. Freak Show Man: the Autobiography of Harry Lewiston, as told to Jerry Holtman, was published posthumously in 1968 by Holloway House Publishing Co.

Harry Jaffe died on June 1, 1965, in San Bernardino County.

== Additional sources ==
- Primary source for this article was Freak Show Man: the Autobiography of Harry Lewiston, as told to Jerry Holtman, published in 1968 by Holloway House Publishing Co.
- http://circusworld.wisconsinhistory.org - a great deal of archival research was performed by Erin Foley from that organization
- Many, many issues of Billboard, including: 4/25/1925, 6/25/1926, 4/20/1935, 4/27/1935, 6/1/1935, 4/25/1936, 12/10/1938, 12/17/1938, 12/24/1938, 1/7/1939, 1/21/1939, and 4/28/1951
- Several issues of Boxoffice from the late 1940s
- Bandwagon, September–October 1980
