= Barnett Bros. Circus =

Former American circus

Origin
- Circus name: Barnett Bros. Circus (1927-1937); Wallace Bros. Circus (1937-1943)
- Country: United States
- Founder(s): Ray W. Rogers
- Year founded: 1927

Information
- Fate: Combined with Clyde Beatty Circus to form "Clyde Beatty and Wallace Bros Trained Wild Animal Circus Combined" in 1943.
- Winter quarters: York, South Carolina

The Barnett Bros. Circus, later known as the Wallace Bros. Circus, was an American circus founded in 1927 that toured both Canada and the United States.

== History ==
The roots of Barnett Bros. Circus trace back to 1922, when its founder, Ray W. Rogers, discovered show business after charging admission to view a caged eagle that fascinated his town. He soon expanded with carnival concessions such as fortune wheels and games of skill, which became the "Rogers Exposition Show" by 1926. He operated in the Maritime Provinces, with headquarters at Halifax, Nova Scotia. A year later, he toured Newfoundland and Labrador, and from this venture, a new circus emerged. The Barnett Bros. Circus was founded by Ray Rogers in 1927. He went into partnership with William Hamilton. Although no one named Barnett was connected to the show, Rogers explained that it simply sounded like a good circus name, so they adopted it. The circus toured Canada alone for two years before crossing into the United States in 1929.

In November 1929, the circus ended its season in Easley, South Carolina, and moved to York, South Carolina, for winter quarters. The townspeople welcomed the Barnett Bros., and from 1929 to 1945, York served as the circus' winter quarters. The site is now occupied by the lumber yard of York Lumber Co.

By the 1932 season, the circus had grown to twice its former size, with about four acres of canvas and seating for 5,000 in the big tent. The three rings, two stages, and expansive hippodrome track formed a complex network where up to fifteen acts could perform simultaneously. Barnett Bros. debuted a tightrope-walking baby elephant named Delhi that year.

At noon in each town, the circus presented a parade. The parade, more than a mile in length, passed along the main streets and included tableaux trucks, four bands, a steam calliope, clowns, girls, horses, performers, and animals.

The 1934 program featured aerialists, acrobats, wire-walkers, bareback riders, and leapers with a menagerie of lions, tigers, camels, and nine elephants. With 300 employees and 40 horses, Barnett Bros. Circus traveled in 67 specially constructed Chevrolet trucks, along with trailers and house-sleeping cars. As one of the largest motorized circuses, Barnett Bros. drew crowds even when unloading its nine massive elephants.

Rogers partnered with financiers George and Minter Wallace in 1937, leading to the circus being renamed Wallace Bros. Circus for that year and again from 1941 to 1943.

By 1939, it was recognized as one of three prominent traveling shows, alongside Ringling Bros. and Barnum & Bailey Circus and Cole Bros. Circus. Movie stars were contracted each year to headline the Barnett Bros. Circus, with Lee Powell, the original Lone Ranger, appearing for the 1939 tour.

The circus remained under the management of R. W. Rogers for 16 years. When Rogers retired in 1942, he declined multiple offers for the circus and transferred it to his employees, allowing them to operate it on a profit-sharing basis. In the following year, the Wallace Bros. Circus merged with the Clyde Beatty Circus. The last of the circus equipment was sold to Clyde Beatty and Floyd King. Beatty finalized the acquisition of the property in January 1945.

The estates of Ray W. Rogers offered the titles and franchises of Wallace Bros. Circus and Barnett Bros. Circus for sale in December 1950. Wallace Bros.' had toured the East, Midwest, and South, while Barnett Brothers' was a prominent motorized show with a strong following in Eastern Canada.

== Notable performers ==
- Texas Ted Lewis, cowboy
- Harry Carey
- Hoot Gibson
- Tom Tyler
- William Desmond
- Lee Powell

== Alternate names ==
- Barnett Bros. and Trained Animal Shows
- Barnett Bros. 3 Ring Circus
- Wallace Bros. Circus
- Clyde Beatty and Wallace Bros. Trained Wild Animal Circus

== See also ==
- List of circuses and circus owners
