= The Lost Jungle =

- DVD cover art
- Directed by: David Howard; Armand Schaefer
- Written by: Sherman Lowe; Al Martin; David Howard; Barney A. Sarecky; Armand Schaefer
- Produced by: Nat Levine
- Starring: Clyde Beatty; Cecilia Parker; Warner Richmond; Syd Saylor; Edward LeSaint
- Cinematography: William Nobles; Alvin Wyckoff
- Edited by: Earl Turner
- Music by: Lee Zahler
- Distributed by: Mascot Pictures
- Release date: June 13, 1934
- Running time: 12 chapters (233 min); 68 minutes (feature)
- Country: United States
- Language: English

The Lost Jungle (1934) is a Mascot Pictures movie serial. A semi-sequel to this serial, Darkest Africa, was released by Republic Pictures in 1936. Republic was made from a merger of several companies, including Mascot, which became the B-Western and serial production arm of the company, as well as providing them with a studio.

== Cast ==
- Clyde Beatty as Clyde Beatty
- Cecilia Parker as Ruth Robinson
- Syd Saylor as Larry Henderson
- Warner Richmond as Sharkey
- Edward LeSaint as Captain Robinson
- Wheeler Oakman as Kirby
- Maston Williams as Thompson
- Max Wagner as Slade
- George 'Gabby' Hayes as Doctor - Dirigible Passenger

== Release ==
In an unusual move, a feature film version was made simultaneously with the serial by re-filming several principal scenes with different dialog, and several other principal scenes altogether new, particularly the ending, thereby creating an essentially new and different story.

== Chapter titles ==
1. Noah's Ark Island
2. Nature in the Raw
3. The Hypnotic Eye
4. The Pit of Crocodiles
5. Gorilla Warfare
6. The Battle of Beasts
7. The Tiger's Prey
8. The Lion's Brood
9. Eyes of the Jungle
10. Human Hyenas
11. The Gorilla
12. Take Them Back Alive

_{Source:}

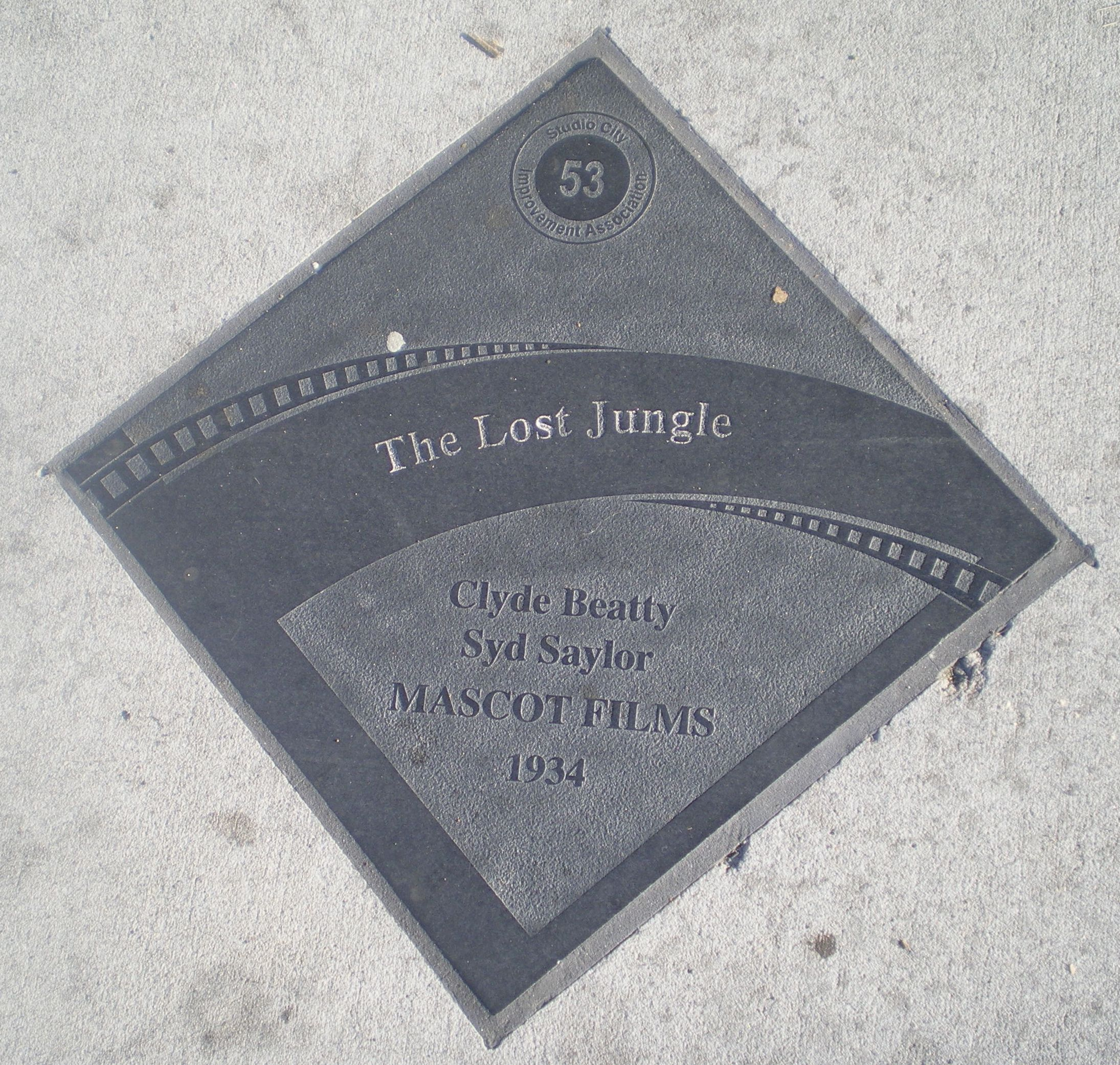
Lost Jungle Diamond, Studio City Walk of Fame
