= Cat College =

1940 film by Joseph M. Newman

- Directed by: Joseph M. Newman
- Produced by: Pete Smith
- Starring: Clyde Beatty; Harriet Beatty; Patricia English
- Distributed by: Metro-Goldwyn-Mayer (MGM)
- Release date: June 29, 1940 (USA Theatrical)
- Running time: 10 minutes
- Country: United States
- Language: English

Cat College is a 1940 American short documentary film directed by Joseph M. Newman and produced by Pete Smith, featuring animal trainer and circus impresario Clyde Beatty.

== Plot ==
While at his winter headquarters in Fort Lauderdale, Florida, in 1938, famed lion tamer Clyde Beatty founded a school for those aspiring to learn to tame jungle-bred lions and tigers.

Among the ten girls who enrolled was 15-year-old Patricia English, a Bayside High School student. Eight quit after their first encounter with a lion, and another after watching lions maul a mule. 17-year-old Patricia later featured in the Pete Smith Specialty short of Beatty's unique course, displaying the skills taught to her. Her tools included a whip (for cues, not defense), a pistol with blanks, and a kitchen chair. The short subject, titled Cat College, guides the audience through Beatty's lion training process, showcasing its risks and difficulties.

== Cast ==
- Pete Smith as Narrator
- Clyde Beatty as Clyde Beatty
- Harriet Beatty as Harriet Beatty
- Patricia English as Pat English

== Production ==
Cat College was directed by Joseph M. Newman. It took place at the Clyde Beatty Jungle Zoo in Fort Lauderdale, Florida, home to Beatty's animal training quarters. It was filmed during the winter of 1939.

Pete Smith's Cat College was first released on June 29, 1940, where it was distributed by Metro-Goldwyn-Mayer.

At Fort Lauderdale's Sparks Theater, the world premiere of the short feature was held, with the film specially flown from Atlanta. Few short features had premiered this way, and the event featured a parade of lions, tigers, and other Beatty Zoo animals.
