= Lewisburg =

Lewisburg is the name of several places in the United States of America:

- Lewisburg, Indiana
- Lewisburg, Kentucky
- Lewisburg, former name of Melber, Kentucky
- Lewisburg, Ohio
- Lewisburg, Oregon
- Lewisburg, Pennsylvania
- Lewisburg, Tennessee
- Lewisburg, West Virginia

== See also ==
- Louisburg (disambiguation)
- Lewiston (disambiguation)
- Lewistown (disambiguation)
- Lewisville (disambiguation)
