= Grace McDaniels =

American sideshow performer

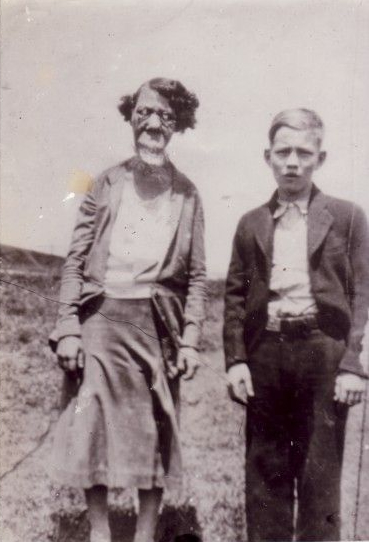
- Grace McDaniels with her son
- Born: Grace Mae McCannon; March 17, 1888; Numa, Iowa in Appanoose County, Iowa, U.S.
- Died: July 29, 1958 (aged 70); Chicago, Illinois, U.S.
- Other name: "Mule-Faced Woman"
- Occupation: Sideshow performer
- Years active: 1933–1958
- Known for: Performing in Harry Lewiston's sideshow, Chicago World's Fair exhibition

Grace McDaniels (March 17, 1888 – July 29, 1958) was an American freak show performer widely known as the "Mule-Faced Woman." Her fame derived from a severe facial deformity that drew significant public attention throughout her career.

Although no verified medical documentation survives, her condition has been most commonly attributed to Sturge–Weber syndrome. However, alternative diagnoses—including PHACE syndrome and other vascular overgrowth disorders—have also been proposed.

McDaniels joined Harry Lewiston's Traveling Circus, earning $175 per week. Despite the exploitative framing of her stage persona—later enshrined in Ripley's Believe It or Not! as the "World's Ugliest Woman"—she was remembered by colleagues and contemporaries for her gentle character and generosity.

== Early life ==
Grace Mae McCannon was born on March 17, 1888, on a farm near Numa, Iowa, in Appanoose County, Iowa, to parents who were described as physically typical and exhibited no visible anomalies.

From birth, McDaniels had a facial vascular malformation that became progressively more pronounced as she grew older. During childhood, she attempted to conceal the birthmark with makeup, but as it enlarged she began wearing a veil in public. She also experienced speech difficulties as a child, although these improved as she reached adulthood.

Throughout her childhood, McDaniels endured persistent ridicule because of her facial difference and became acutely aware of her appearance.

== Medical condition ==
McDaniels was born with a facial vascular malformation that became progressively larger as she grew older. During her childhood, she attempted to conceal the affected area with makeup. As the lesion enlarged, she began wearing a veil in public. She also experienced speech difficulties as a child, although her speech improved as she reached adulthood.

Throughout her life, McDaniels was examined by physicians, but no treatment or cure was found for her condition. No contemporary medical records documenting her diagnosis are known to survive.

Since McDaniels' death in 1958, several retrospective diagnoses have been proposed for her condition. It has most commonly been attributed to Sturge–Weber syndrome, a rare congenital disorder involving abnormal blood vessels. However, researchers have questioned that diagnosis because McDaniels was not reported to have several features commonly associated with the syndrome, including seizures or intellectual disability.

In 2019, dermatologist Alexis E. Carrington and colleagues proposed that PHACE syndrome may better explain McDaniels' appearance. PHACE syndrome is a rare congenital disorder characterized by large facial birthmarks and developmental abnormalities. The authors concluded that, because no medical records survive and only historical photographs remain, McDaniels' condition cannot be diagnosed with certainty.

== Career ==
Rose Lewiston (far left), Eli Lewiston (child on left), Harry Lewiston (far right), and several of their performing "freaks." Identified performers include Grace McDaniels the "Mule-Faced Woman" (just left of center in the back row; most of her face is hidden) and Tony Marino the sword swallower (in suit and tie).

McDaniels first exhibited publicly at the Century of Progress World's Fair in Chicago in 1933, at the age of 45. Two years later, in 1935, at age 47, she won a contest titled "The Ugliest Woman" and joined Harry Lewiston's travelling sideshow. Lewiston reported that McDaniels earned $175 per week.

During her career with Lewiston, McDaniels toured extensively across the United States and parts of Canada. She performed alongside other sideshow entertainers, including sword swallower Tony Marino.

Promoters widely advertised her as the "Ugliest Woman in the World" or an "Ugly Freak", labels that she found humiliating and repeatedly objected to.

As her career developed through the 1930s and 1940s, McDaniels resisted many aspects of her promotion. She often refused publicity photographs, disliked self-promotion, and reportedly covered her ears before taking the stage so she would not hear herself introduced as the "Ugliest Woman". Rather than rejecting exhibition altogether, she asked instead to be billed as the "Mule-Faced Woman", a stage name she considered less degrading than the alternatives used by promoters.

Sideshow publicity and contemporary newspaper accounts also sensationalized audience reactions. Reports claimed that some spectators fainted at the sight of her face, while others reported that she received numerous marriage proposals.

== Personal life ==
Accounts differ as to whether McDaniels ever formally married. She gave birth to one son, Elmer, whom she described as "her greatest treasure." Contemporaries characterised her as a devoted and affectionate mother. Elmer, noted for his striking good looks, served as his mother's manager during her tours. However, he struggled with alcoholism and morphine dependence and was reportedly abusive toward his mother. His repeated thefts from both McDaniels and the circus to pay gambling debts ultimately led to their dismissal from the troupe. Elmer later died from liver cirrhosis.

== Death ==
McDaniels died of natural causes on July 29, 1958, in Chicago, Illinois, at the age of seventy.

== In popular culture ==
McDaniels is referenced in Tom Waits' song Lucky Day (Overture) from his album The Black Rider, which explores the lives of sideshow performers.

She was also featured on the cover of the compilation album Down to the Last 75: The Times They Are-A-Changin' Volume Four (2020), a collection of recordings by various artists.

== See also ==
- Lizzie Velásquez – American motivational speaker and YouTuber
- Mary Ann Bevan – Side show performer, nurse
