= Lewistown =

Lewistown may refer to:

== United Kingdom ==
- Lewistown, Bridgend, Wales

== United States ==
- Lewiston, Idaho
- Lewistown, Illinois
- Lewistown, Kentucky
- Lewiston, Maine, originally called Lewistown
- Lewistown, Frederick County, Maryland
- Lewistown, Talbot County, Maryland
- Lewistown, Missouri
- Lewistown, Montana
- Lewistown, Ohio
- Lewistown, Pennsylvania

== See also ==
- Lewiston (disambiguation)
