= Clyde Beatty =

American animal trainer and actor (1903–1965)

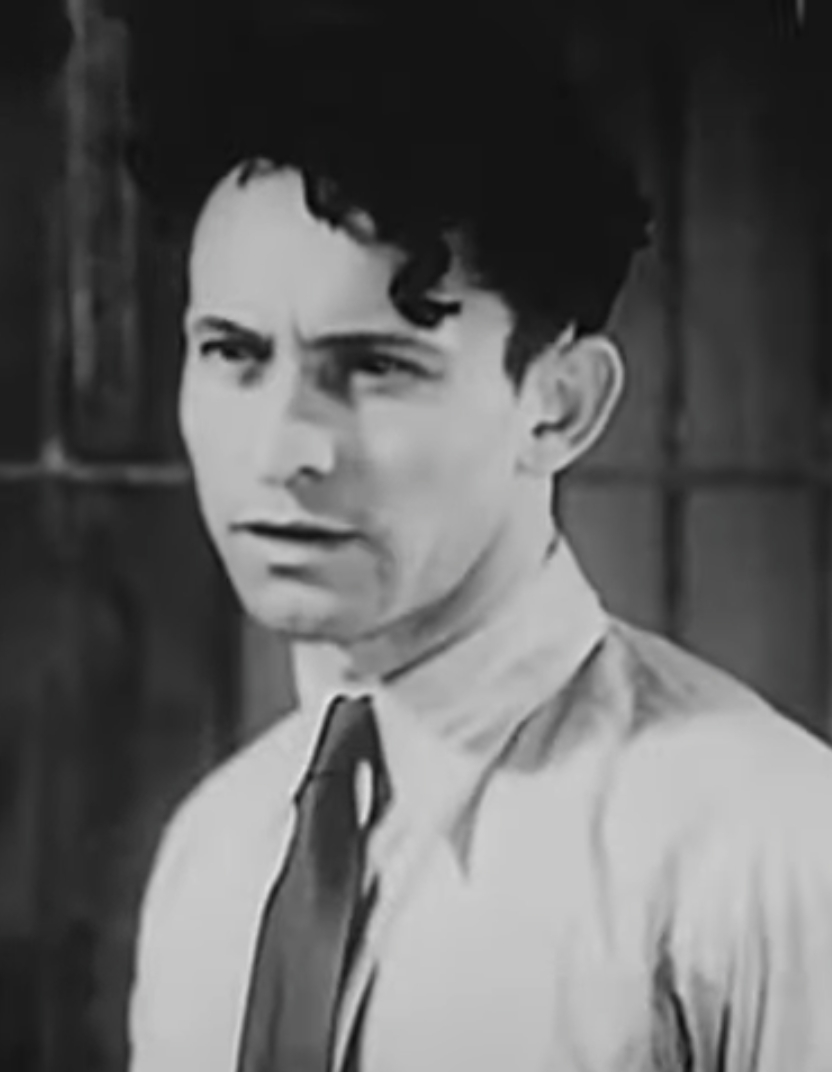
- Beatty in The Lost Jungle (1934)
- Born: June 10, 1903; Bainbridge, Ross County, Ohio, U.S.
- Died: July 19, 1965 (aged 62); Ventura, California, U.S.
- Resting place: Forest Lawn Memorial Park, Hollywood Hills
- Occupations: Animal trainer; performer; actor; circus owner
- Years active: 1921–1965
- Spouses: Earnestine Pegg (m. 1926; div. 1932) Harriett Evans (m. 1933; died 1950) Jane Abel (m. 1951)
- Children: 2

Clyde Raymond Beatty (June 10, 1903 – July 19, 1965) was an American animal trainer, zoo owner, and circus mogul. He joined Howe's Great London Circus in 1921 as a cage boy and spent the next four decades rising to fame as one of the most famous circus performers and animal trainers in the world. Through his career, the circus impresario owned several circuses, including his own Clyde Beatty Circus from 1945 to 1956.

== Biography ==
Clyde Beatty was born on June 10, 1903, in Bainbridge, Ross County, Ohio, the eldest of nine children. He graduated from nearby Chillicothe High School, but had already succumbed to the world of the circus.

On August 16, 1921, at dawn, he and Howard Smith clambered into a boxcar on the DT&I Railroad, bound for Washington Court House, Ohio, and joined Howe's Great London and Van Amburgh's Wild Animal Circus. His first boss was the legendary wild animal trainer Louis Roth. Next, he came under the tutelage of John "Chubby" Guilfoyle. By 1923 Beatty was working small mixed groups of big cats in the first of 42 uninterrupted seasons in the circus.

Beatty became famous for his "fighting act", in which he entered a cage with wild animals with a whip and a pistol strapped to his side. The act was designed to showcase his courage and mastery of wild beasts. Throughout his career Beatty trained hippos, polar bears, brown bears, lions, tigers, cougars, and hyenas; sometimes, many brought together all at once in a single cage in a potentially lethal combination. At the height of his fame, the act featured as many as 43 lions and tigers of both sexes, for which Beatty still holds a world record. Beatty had his own rail car in the 35-car circus train.

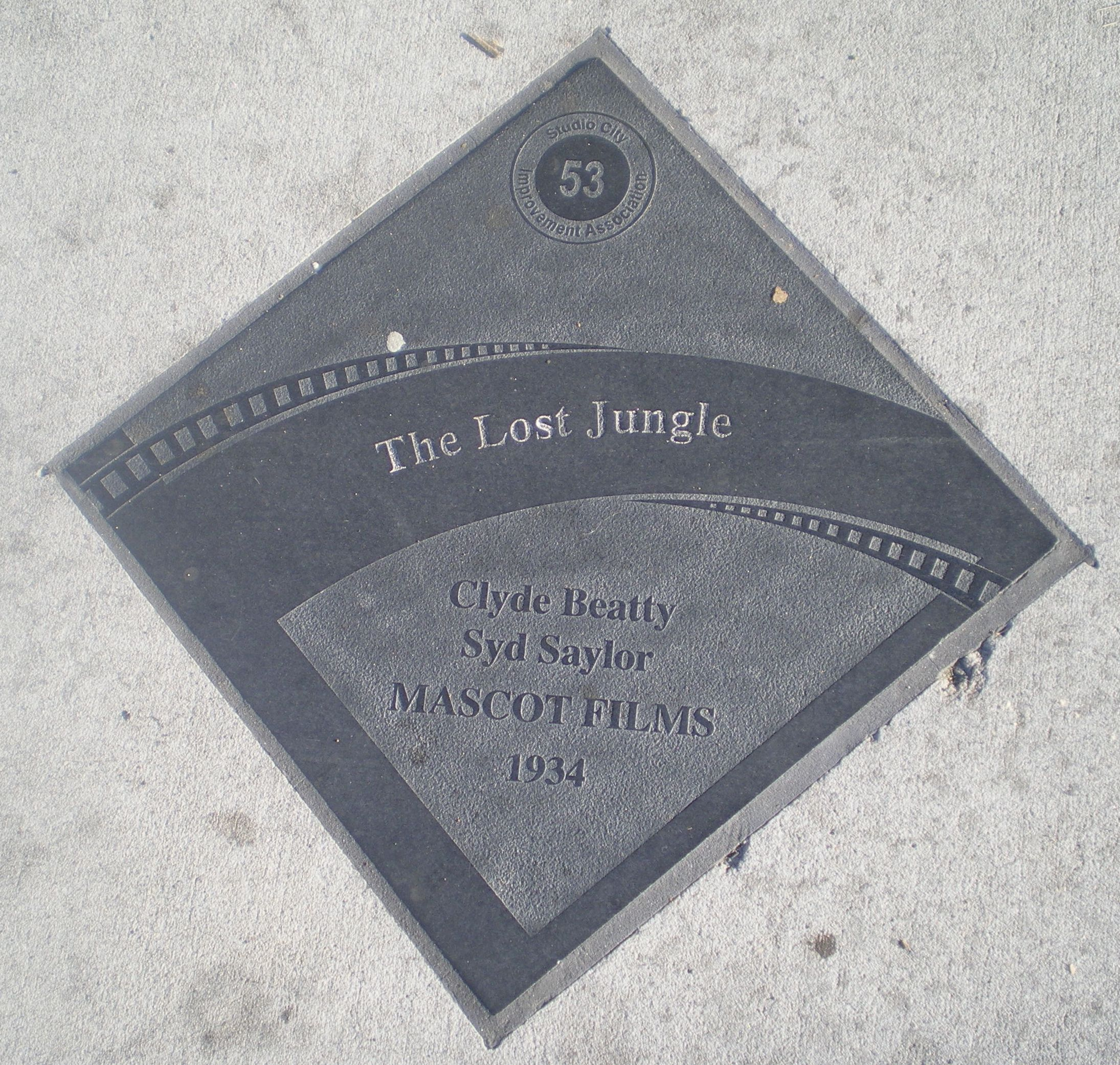
Diamond honoring Beatty in the Studio City Walk of Fame

Beatty's self-confidence and unabashed theatrics swiftly catapulted him to circus fame. Within a decade, he became synonymous with the best and most exciting wild animal training ever seen under the Big Top. There have been suggestions that Beatty was the first lion tamer to use a chair in his act, but in an autobiographical book he disclaimed credit for this technique: "It was in use when I was a cage boy and had been used long before."

Beatty's fame was such that he appeared in films from the 1930s to the 1950s and on television until the 1960s. He was also the star of his own syndicated radio series, The Clyde Beatty Show, from 1950 to 1952. The weekly programs featured adventures loosely based on his real-life exploits. The stories were no doubt more fictitious than real, and Beatty actually appeared in name only; Vic Perrin (not identified as such to the radio audience) impersonated him on the show.

Beatty's "fighting act" made him the paradigm of a lion tamer for more than a generation. He was once mauled by a lion named Nero and was in the hospital for ten weeks as a result of the attack. He later faced down Nero in a cage for the 1933 film The Big Cage.

A caricature of Beatty at the height of his fame, drawn by Alex Gard, was displayed at Sardi's restaurant in New York City and is now part of the Billy Rose Theatre Collection at the New York Public Library.

In 1957, Beatty performed his act on The Ed Sullivan Show. He had complained during rehearsal that the stage was too small and unsafe for his act, but Sullivan convinced him to perform anyway. During the act, Beatty lost control of the animals. To prevent the home audience from realizing the live performance had gone awry, Sullivan went into the audience to introduce some of the celebrity attendees. Luckily, Beatty was able to subdue the lions by firing blank cartridges, without injury to himself or the lions. A clip of the performance is included in a DVD of the best of the Sullivan show.

Beatty married Harriett Evans (her name is often printed as "Harriet"), an aerialist, on September 16, 1933. The marriage lasted until her death in 1950 in Kosciusko, Mississippi, reportedly from a heart ailment. Their union seems to have been founded on a great deal of team spirit, and after a year or so she insisted on becoming an animal trainer herself, which was highly unusual for a woman in those days. Beatty let her have an act in 1935 and she did well, proving to be popular with the public and the press. Her daughter Albina (born 1931), having learned animal training skills from her stepfather and mother, followed in their footsteps as a lion trainer. She stated that Beatty's gift to her was understanding his instincts regarding the animals and how best to control them.

In 1951 he married nightclub singer Lorraine Abel.

Beatty died of cancer in 1965, at age 62, in Ventura, California, and was interred in the Forest Lawn–Hollywood Hills Cemetery in Los Angeles.

A museum was opened in Beatty's hometown of Bainbridge, Ohio celebrating his life and times. Illinois State University has a 1960 route book for the Cole-Beatty circus posted online.

== Marriages ==
1. Beatrice Ernestine Pegg - Married January 26, 1926. Divorced November 1st, 1932. 1 Child: Joyce Beatty Ferguson
2. Harriett Evans - Married September 13, 1933. Harriett died on October 15, 1950, from a heart condition. 1 step child: Albina Diana Davila
3. Jane Lorraine Abel - Married July 31, 1951. Clyde died on July 19, 1965, from esophageal cancer. 1 Child: Clyde Beatty Jr.

== Circus career ==
- 1921 Howe's Great London, joined 16 August, Washington Court House, Ohio
- 1922 Gollmar Bros. (same show as above) until on 1 November when Beatty was picked up by the Hagenbeck-Wallace train on the way to Peru, Indiana along with hippo Victor to appear in the corporation's winter show
- 1923 John Robinson (for the most part the 1922 Gollmar show, frequently billed as "100th Anniversary")
- 1924 John Robinson
- 1925-1934 Hagenbeck-Wallace (sometimes Carl Hagenbeck-Wallace)
- 1931-1934 Played dates at Madison Square Garden and Boston Garden with Ringling Bros. and Barnum & Bailey, then back to Hagenbeck-Wallace each year for road tours
- 1935-1938 Cole Bros. (sometimes "Cole Bros.-Clyde Beatty"; Cole closed early on 15 August 1938)
- 1938 Robbins Bros.-Beatty (same owners as Cole), Beatty joined 15 August for remainder of season
- 1939 Million Dollar Pier, Atlantic City
- 1940 Hamid-Morton. This show while under tents was the leased Wallace Bros. Circus, repainted. Sometimes "Hamid-Morton featuring Clyde Beatty", sometimes "Hamid-Morton-Clyde Beatty Combined" (the titles were also used on some indoor dates)
- 1941-1942 Johnny J. Jones Shows (railroad carnival)
- 1943 Clyde-Beatty-Wallace Bros. (actually the Wallace Bros. show), Beatty was paid for his act and use of his name
- 1944 Clyde Beatty-Russell Bros. (actually the Russell Bros. show), Beatty was paid for his act and use of his name
- 1945 Clyde Beatty Circus, sometimes "Clyde Beatty All New Trained Wild Animal Circus" (motorized-the former Wallace Bros., Beatty owned)
- 1946 Clyde Beatty Circus (the former Russell Bros.-Pan Pacific Circus on rails); Art Concello, principal owner. Beatty bought him out after the 1946 season.
- 1947-1956 Clyde Beatty Circus (on rails 1955-mid 1955, Concello becomes part owner)
- 1956 Clyde Beatty Circus closes early 9 May Burbank, California, to winter quarters in Deming, New Mexico; show reorganized under new owners, reopened 30 August in Deming.
- 1957-1958 Clyde Beatty Circus, new owners, on trucks
- 1959-1965 Clyde Beatty-Cole Bros. Circus, on trucks
- 1964 Beatty out for cancer treatment 18 July until 30 October.
- 1965 Beatty leaves show 10 May, never returns.
- Various Dates: Beatty also appeared at many spots and dates for George Hamid, Orrin Davenport, and others in Shrine, Grotto, etc. shows which are too numerous to list.

== Bibliography ==
- 1933 The Big Cage (co-author Edward Anthony)
- 1941 Jungle Performers (co-author Earl Wilson)
- 1965 Facing The Big Cats: My World of Lions and Tigers (co-author Edward Anthony)

== Filmography ==
Year	Title	Role	Notes
1933	The Big Cage	Himself	
1934	The Lost Jungle	Himself	
1936	Darkest Africa	Himself	Serial
1940	Cat College	Himself - Lion Tamer	Short documentary
1944	Jungle Woman	Fred Mason (in long shots)	Uncredited, (archive footage)
1946	Here Comes the Circus	Animal Trainer	Short documentary
1949	Africa Screams	Himself	also known as Abbott and Costello: Africa Screams (1949 comedy)
1953	Perils of the Jungle	Himself	
1954	Ring of Fear	Himself	(final film role)

== Cultural references ==
- In the 1997 film Fast, Cheap & Out of Control, the lion tamer Dave Hoover cites Beatty as a major influence on his career. The director, Errol Morris, used several clips from Beatty's films in his interviews with Hoover.
- The short film Here Comes the Circus is featured in a 1993 episode of Mystery Science Theater 3000.
- In the 1981 television pilot of The Greatest American Hero, Ralph Hinkley is told by a fellow teacher that the "Clyde Beatty technique" is one way to use a chair to keep his unruly students "at bay".
- In the 1961 adventure film Hatari! John Wayne's character refers to the use of a chair in controlling a cheetah as a "Clyde Beatty routine"
- In Season 2, Episode 27 of Leave It to Beaver, "A Horse Named Nick," (first aired April 2, 1959), Beaver asks Ward if he and Wally will have to take a bath every night after working at the carnival, and Ward responds "... I imagine Clyde Beatty has the same problem." In an aside, Beaver then asks Wally, "Hey Wally, do you think Clyde Beatty really takes a bath every night?" Wally, "Nah, I think dad's just givin' us the business."
- In the I Love Lucy episode "The Kleptomaniac" (season 1, episode 27)(first aired Apr 14, 1952), Lucy and Ricky mention the Clyde Beatty Circus before Lucy comes onto the set with a baby elephant.

== Sources ==
- Ohmart, Ben (2002). It's That Time Again. Albany: BearManor Media. ISBN 0-9714570-2-6.
