= Darkest Africa =

- Directed by: B. Reeves Eason; Joseph Kane
- Written by: Ted Parsons; John Rathmell; Barney Sarecky
- Produced by: Nat Levine; Barney Sarecky
- Starring: Clyde Beatty; Manuel King; Elaine Shepard; Lucien Prival; Ray "Crash" Corrigan; Wheeler Oakman
- Cinematography: Edgar Lyons; William Nobles
- Edited by: Dick Fantl
- Music by: Arthur Kay
- Distributed by: Republic Pictures
- Release dates: February 15, 1936 (U.S. serial); May 21, 1936 (U.S. feature); November 10, 1948 (U.S. re-release); 1966 (U.S. TV)
- Running time: 15 chapters / 269 minutes (serial); 73 minutes (feature); 100 minutes (TV)
- Country: United States
- Language: English
- Budget: $107,281 (negative cost: $119,343)

Darkest Africa (1936) is a Republic movie serial. This was the first serial produced by Republic Pictures and was a loose sequel to a Mascot Pictures serial called The Lost Jungle, also starring Clyde Beatty. Mascot, and other companies, had been taken over in 1935 by Consolidated Film Laboratories and merged to become Republic. Producer Nat Levine was formerly the owner of Mascot Pictures.

== Plot ==
While on Safari in East Africa, Clyde Beatty runs into a loincloth wearing boy, Baru, and his pet ape Bonga. Baru reveals that he has escaped from the lost city of Joba, King Solomon's sacred city of the Golden Bat, but that his sister, Valerie, remains there. She was found by High Priest Dagna as a child and declared to be Joba's goddess as part of his quest for power. Her escape could cause a revolt among the city's citizens. Clyde agrees to help Baru rescue Valerie and they set out to Joba, through the Valley of Lost Souls.

Meanwhile, the unscrupulous Durkin and Craddock notice the green diamond Baru is wearing and follow them to plunder the city for similar jewels. Dagna receives word of the heroes approach from his bat-men and makes plans to stop them.

== Cast ==
=== Main cast ===
- Clyde Beatty as Himself, world-famous big game hunter and lion tamer. Beatty was billed as the "World's Greatest Wild Animal Trainer"
- Manuel King as Baru Tremaine, escapee from the Lost City of Joba. King was billed as the "World's Youngest Wild Animal Trainer"
- Elaine Shepard as Valerie Tremaine, Baru's sister and captive "goddess" of Joba
- Lucien Prival as Dagna, High priest and ruler of Joba
- Ray "Crash" Corrigan (in ape suit) as Bonga, Baru's pet ape
- Wheeler Oakman as Durkin, "Shady trading-post entrepreneur"

=== Supporting cast ===
- Edward McWade as Gorn, keeper of the Books of Law in the Lost City of Joba
- Edmund Cobb as Craddock, "Shady trading-post entrepreneur"
- Ray Turner as Hambone, Clyde's assistant
- Donald Reed as Negus, a slave in the Lost City of Joba

== Production ==
Darkest Africa was budgeted at $107,281 although the final negative cost was $119,343 (a $12,062, or 11.2%, overspend). It was the most expensive Republic serial of 1936.

It was filmed between 29 November and 28 December 1935 under the working title Dark Continent. The serial's production number was 416. Over all sixty-six Republic serials, however, this was the third cheapest per chapter (it cost $7,956.20 on average to produce each of the 15 chapters in the serial).

=== Special effects ===
The special effects are by John T. Coyle and the Lydecker brothers.

Darkest Africa contained the first use of the flying special effects that Republic would go on to use in future serials, such as the acclaimed Adventures of Captain Marvel. This serial also showcased examples of the studio's model work that would be one of the factors in its future reputation and success. The destruction of the lost city in the final chapter is particularly highlighted by Cline as a "picturesque example."

=== Stunts ===
- Yakima Canutt was the ramrod (stunt coordinator) on this serial.
- Eddie Parker as Craddock (doubling Edmund Cobb)

== Release ==
=== Theatrical ===
Darkest Africa's official release date is 15 February 1936, although this is actually the date the seventh chapter was made available to film exchanges.

A 73-minute feature film version, created by editing the serial footage together, was released on 21 May 1936.

Darkest Africa was first re-released under the title of King of Jungleland, on 10 November 1948, between the first runs of Adventures of Frank and Jesse James and Federal Agents vs. Underworld, Inc. The name change was to conform to Republic's successful tradition of using the "King of..." naming format.

=== Television ===
Darkest Africa was one of several Republic serials re-released for television in 1966. It was again retitled, this time as Batmen of Africa, to capitalize on the Batman craze of the time. This version was cut down to 100-minutes in length.

== Critical reception ==
Cline wrote of this serial, that "some of the finest photography of Beatty's animal training techniques ever seen were numbered in this production." He criticizes the performance of Prival as Dagna as less than nothing, consisting of "rapid, shrill delivery of lines in a monotone." Prival's only redeeming quality is a "mean and treacherous cast to his features."

== Chapter titles ==
1. BARU – Son of the Jungle (29 min 37s)
2. The Tiger-Men's God (18 min 13s)
3. Bat-Men of Joba (17 min 59s)
4. The Hunter Lions of Joba (17 min 27s)
5. Bonga's Courage (16 min 33s)
6. Prisoners of the High Priest (18 min 34s)
7. Swing for Life (17 min 47s)
8. Fang and Claw (17 min 9s)
9. When Birdmen Strike (16 min 49s)
10. Trial by Thunder-Rods (16 min 42s)
11. Jars of Death (16 min 35s)
12. Revolt of the Slaves (16 min 18s)
13. Gauntlet of Destruction (16 min 48s)
14. The Divine Sacrifice (15 min 48s)
15. The Prophecy of Gorn (17min 3s)

_{Source:}

This was the only 15-chapter serial produced by Republic in 1936 (the others were two 12-chapter serials and one 14-chapter serial). The next 15-chapter serial was Dick Tracy in 1937, itself the only 15-chapter serial of its year.

== Cliffhangers ==
1. A volcanic eruption and resultant earthquake causes a landslide to fall on the heroes.
2. Clyde is forced into a pit containing a tiger.
3. The heroes hide from the chasing bat-men in an empty sarcophagus only for it to be stabbed repeatedly with their spears.
4. Clyde is punched off a platform by Craddock, lands unconscious in a mine shaft and is attacked by a pack of hunter lions.
5. Clyde is tied to a tree and attacked by a lion.
6. Dagna sets a pack of hunter lions on Clyde.
7. Clyde hides behind a curtain but he's spotted and the curtain is riddled with a hail of bullets.
8. An unconscious Baru is attacked by a tiger; The vine Clyde is climbing is cut by Durkin.
9. A patrol of bat-men attack Clyde from the air, catching him with two thrown spears.
10. A bat-man cuts the rope on which Clyde is swinging to freedom.
11. The heroes are enveloped in a cloud of poison gas.
12. Swinging to rescue Valerie, Clyde's rope is cut by a slave and they fall into a crowd of armed rebels.
13. An explosion showers two heroes in rocks.
14. Valerie commits suicide by jumping from Pinnacle Rock.
