= Leweston =

Leweston may refer to:

- Leweston, Dorset, England, the location of Leweston School
- Leweston, Pembrokeshire, a location in Wales
- Catherston Leweston, Dorset, England
- John Leweston, an English politician
