= Lewiston =

Lewiston may refer to:

== Places ==
=== United States ===
- Lewiston, Alabama
- Lewiston, California
- Lewiston, Georgia
- Lewiston, Idaho
  - Lewiston, Idaho metropolitan area
- Lewiston, Maine
  - Lewiston, Maine metropolitan area
  - 2023 Lewiston shootings, a spree shooting in Lewiston
- Lewiston, Michigan
- Lewiston, Minnesota
- Lewiston, Dakota County, Minnesota, an extinct town
- Lewiston, Nebraska
- Lewiston (town), New York
  - Lewiston (village), New York, a village within the town
- Lewiston, North Carolina
- Lewiston, Utah
- Lewiston, Vermont
- Lewiston, Wisconsin, a town
  - Lewiston (community), Wisconsin, an unincorporated community

=== Elsewhere ===
- Lewiston, Highland, Scotland
- Lewiston, South Australia

== Media ==
- Lewiston (play), a play by Samuel D. Hunter set in Lewiston, Idaho

== Surname ==
- David Lewiston (1929–2017), British collector of traditional music
- Dennis Lewiston (1934–2014), American cinematographer
- Harry Lewiston (1900–1965), American showman

== See also ==
- Lewistown (disambiguation)
- Leweston (disambiguation)
