= Lewistown, Talbot County, Maryland =

Unincorporated community in Maryland, U.S.

Coordinates: 38°50′42″N 75°56′52″W

Lewistown is an unincorporated community in Talbot County, Maryland, United States.
