= Gollmar Bros. Circus =

Former American circus

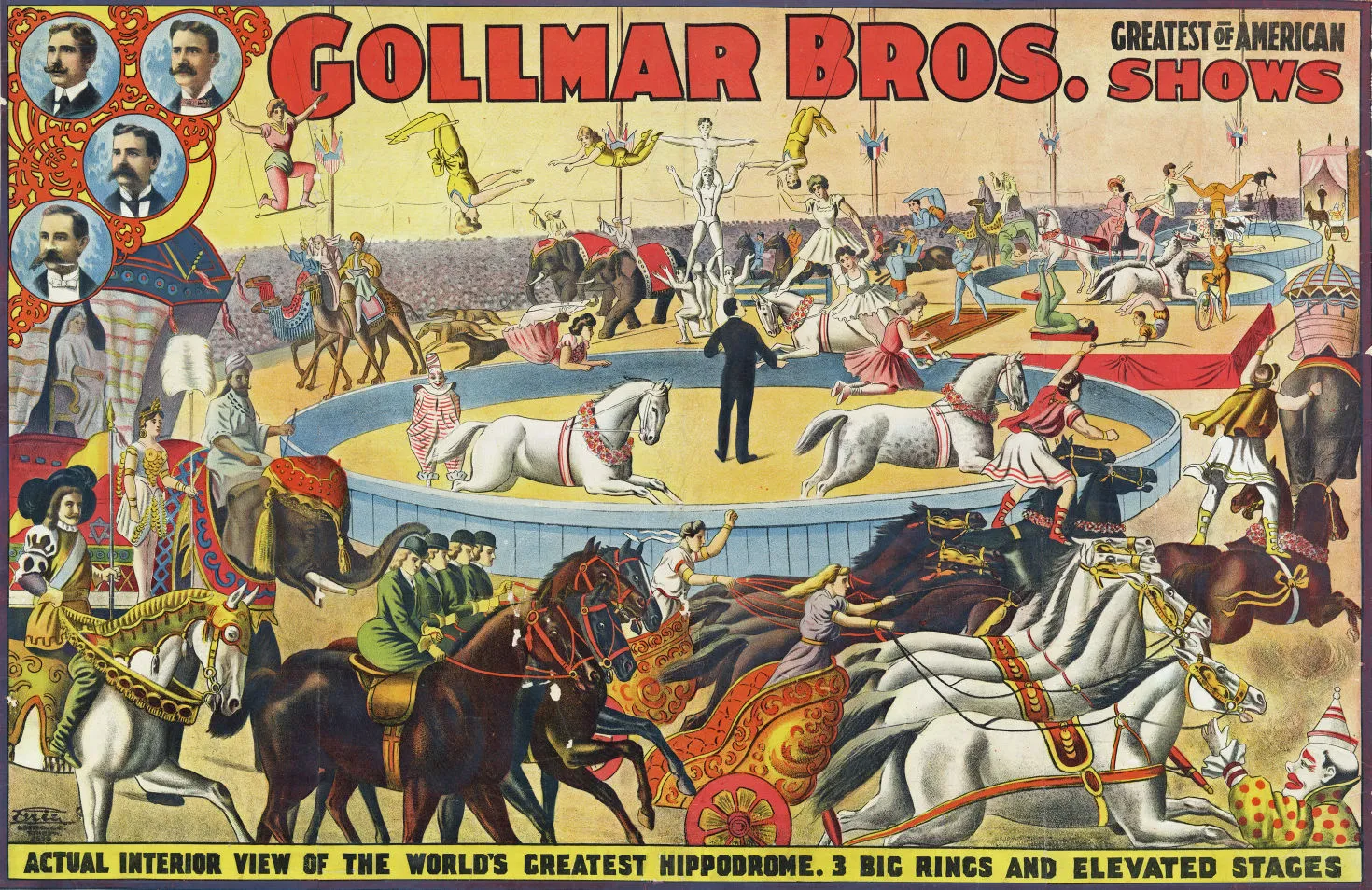
- Poster for Gollmar Bros. Greatest of American Shows, ca. 1912

Origin
- Country: United States
- Founder(s): Gollmar brothers
- Year founded: 1891

Information
- Operator(s): Charles A. Gollmar; Fred C. Gollmar
- Winter quarters: Baraboo, Wisconsin

The Gollmar Bros. Circus was an American circus founded in Baraboo, Wisconsin, in 1891.

== History ==
The Gollmar Bros. Circus, formed in 1891 in Baraboo, Wisconsin, was run by brothers Walter, Fred, Charles, Ben, and Jake Gollmar. Their first cousins, the Ringling brothers, had established the Ringling Brothers Circus in the 1880s.

The circus began as a wagon show in Baraboo in early May 1891, then moved on to Sauk City, Wisconsin. The show maintained its winter quarters on Baraboo's Second Avenue from 1891 until 1916.

The Gollmar Bros. Leading Shows of the World, staged in 1900 as a two-ring circus and menagerie, was managed by Charles A. Gollmar, with Fred C. Gollmar as advance manager, B. F. Gollmar as treasurer, and Walt Gollmar as equestrian director.

By 1903, the brothers shifted to rail, and at its peak, the show used 22 cars, establishing itself as a major Midwest circus. The show grew to three rings and a stage with riders, aerialists, acrobats, jugglers, wire walkers, and contortionists, while the menagerie held five animals.

The Gollmar Brothers added touring musicians, with their circus band reaching seventeen members in 1910.

In the fall of 1916, James Patterson of the Patterson Carnival Company bought the Gollmar Bros. Circus equipment, touring it as the "Gollmar Bros.-Jas. Patterson Circus" for the 1917 season only.

The Gollmar brothers' title remained unused for nearly five years before they leased it in early 1922 to Jerry Mugivan of the American Circus Corporation for five years. That year, Frank Gollmar rejoined the show to head the advance department. The title Howe's Great London Shows was changed to Gollmar Bros. Circus, occasionally printed as Gollmar Bros. & Yankee Robinson Combined Circus. At that time, Jerry Mugivan and Bert Bowers operated Gollmar Bros., Sells-Floto, Hagenbeck-Wallace, and John Robinson's circuses. The Gollmar title was shelved by the American Circus Corporation in 1923 to save on expenses. For the 1923 season, the best equipment from both the 1922 John Robinson Circus and the Gollmar Bros. Circus formed a new show called John Robinson Circus, largely featuring Gollmar equipment.

After a short return for the 1925 season, the Gollmar title was shelved once more, and the 1926 end of the Mugivan lease marked the final circus using the name.

The Robert L. Parkinson Library and Research Center, part of Circus World Museum, preserves the business records of the Gollmar Bros. Circus.

== Alternate names ==
- Gollmar Brothers' Circus
- Gollmar Bros.-Jas. Patterson Circus
- Gollmar Brothers & Yankee Robinson Combined Circuses
- Gollmar Bros. Circus and Schuman's United Monster Shows

== See also ==
- List of circuses and circus owners
